= McLaren =

British auto racing team

(United Kingdom) McLaren-Mercedes
- Full name: McLaren Mastercard F1 Team
- Base: McLaren Technology Centre; Woking, Surrey, England
- Team principal(s): Andrea Stella (Team Principal); Zak Brown (Chief Executive Officer)
- Technical management: Rob Marshall (Chief Technical Officer & Chief Designer); Peter Prodromou (Chief Technical Officer, Aerodynamics); Mark Ingham (Technical Director, Engineering Delivery); Mark Temple (Technical Director, Performance)
- Founder(s): Bruce McLaren
- Website: mclaren.com/racing/formula-1

2026 Formula One World Championship
- Race drivers: 1. (United Kingdom) Lando Norris; 81. (Australia) Oscar Piastri
- Test driver(s): (Italy) Leonardo Fornaroli
- Chassis: MCL40
- Engine: Mercedes
- Tyres: Pirelli

Formula One World Championship career
- First entry: 1966 Monaco Grand Prix
- Last entry: 2026 São Paulo Grand Prix
- Races entered: 1018 (1013 starts)
- Engines: Ford, Serenissima, BRM, Alfa Romeo, TAG, Honda, Peugeot, Mercedes, Renault
- Constructors' Championships: 10 (1974, 1984, 1985, 1988, 1989, 1990, 1991, 1998, 2024, 2025)
- Drivers' Championships: 13 (1974, 1976, 1984, 1985, 1986, 1988, 1989, 1990, 1991, 1998, 1999, 2008, 2025)
- Race victories: 206
- Podiums: 566
- Points: 8187.5
- Pole positions: 181
- Fastest laps: 185
- 2025 position: 1st (833 pts)

McLaren Racing Limited (/məˈklærən/ mə-KLARR-ən), currently competing in Formula One as McLaren Mastercard F1 Team, is a British motor racing team based at the McLaren Technology Centre in Woking, Surrey, England. The team is a subsidiary of the McLaren Group, wholly owned by Mumtalakat Holding Company.

McLaren is best known as a Formula One chassis constructor, the second-oldest active team and the second-most successful Formula One team after Ferrari, having won 206 races, 13 Drivers' Championships, and 10 Constructors' Championships. McLaren is one of only three constructors, and the only team, to complete the Triple Crown of Motorsport (wins at the Indianapolis 500, 24 Hours of Le Mans, and Monaco Grand Prix). The 2026 Chinese Grand Prix marked McLaren's 1000th Grand Prix entry, making them the second constructor after Ferrari to reach this milestone. The team currently uses Mercedes power. Its partnership with Honda from 1988 to 1991 produced four consecutive Constructors' Championships; the team won 15 of 16 races in 1988.

Founded by Bruce McLaren in 1963, the team made its Grand Prix debut at the 1966 Monaco Grand Prix, won its first Grand Prix at the 1968 Belgian Grand Prix, and took its first Formula One championships in 1974. Emerson Fittipaldi, James Hunt, Niki Lauda, Alain Prost, Ayrton Senna, Mika Häkkinen, Lewis Hamilton, and Lando Norris have won Drivers' Championships with McLaren. Champions Denny Hulme, Jody Scheckter, Keke Rosberg, Fernando Alonso, Kimi Räikkönen, and Jenson Button also drove for the team at one point during their careers. The team's most recent titles were secured in 2025.

McLaren also has a history in sports car and endurance racing, with a modified McLaren F1 road car winning the 24 Hours of Le Mans in 1995. The team is set to reenter the FIA World Endurance Championship in 2027 with an LMDh entry, the McLaren MCL-HY. The team has also had experience in American open wheel racing as both an entrant and a chassis constructor, and has won the Canadian-American Challenge Cup (Can-Am) sports car racing championship. Their current IndyCar entry, Arrow McLaren, has won 10 races since its takeover of Sam Schmidt Motorsports in 2020. McLaren has previously entered the electric motorsports Formula E and Extreme E, though they achieved less success there than their other ventures and ended up pulling out of both. McLaren also participates in Formula One esports, in which they won the 2022 championship.

== Background ==
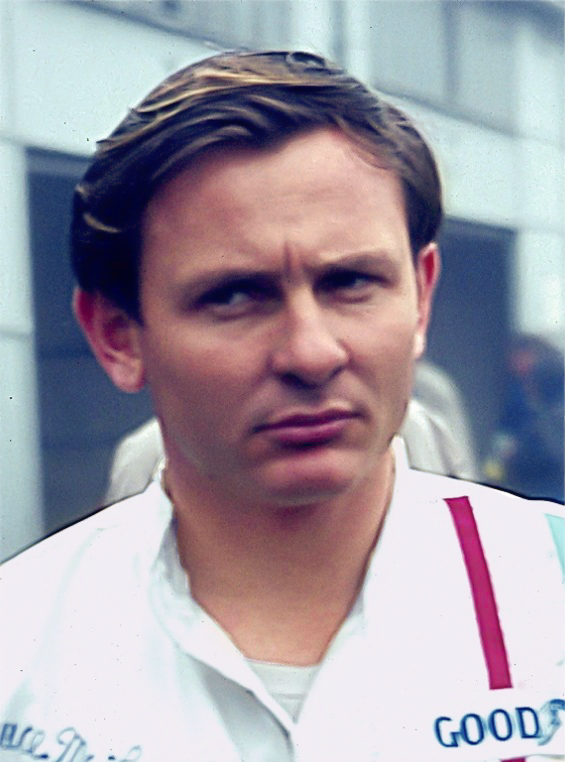
The McLaren Racing team's founder Bruce McLaren

Bruce McLaren Motor Racing was founded in 1963 by New Zealander Bruce McLaren. Bruce was a works driver for the British Formula One team Cooper with whom he had won three Grands Prix and come second in the 1960 World Championship. Wanting to compete in the Australasian Tasman Series, Bruce approached his employers, but when team owner Charles Cooper insisted on using 1.5-litre Formula One-specification engines instead of the 2.5-litre motors permitted by the Tasman rules, Bruce decided to set up his own team to run him and his prospective Formula One teammate Timmy Mayer with custom-built Cooper cars.

Bruce won the 1964 series, but Mayer was killed in practice for the final race at the Longford Circuit in Tasmania. When Bruce McLaren approached Teddy Mayer to help him with the purchase of the Zerex sports car from Roger Penske, Teddy Mayer and Bruce McLaren began discussing a business partnership resulting in Teddy Mayer buying in to Bruce McLaren Motor Racing Limited (BMMR) and ultimately becoming its largest shareholder.

The team, competing under a British racing licence, was based in Feltham, England, from 1963 to 1964, and in Colnbrook, England, from 1965 until 1981, and it has been based in Woking, England, since 1981. Despite this, Bruce never used the traditional British racing green on his cars. Instead, he used colour schemes that were not based on national principles (e.g. his first Formula One car, the McLaren M2B car, raced at the 1966 Monaco Grand Prix, was painted white with a green stripe, to represent a fictional Yamura team in John Frankenheimer's film Grand Prix).

During this period, Bruce drove for his team in sports car races in the United Kingdom and North America and also entered the 1965 Tasman Series with Phil Hill, but did not win it. He continued to drive in Grands Prix for Cooper, but judging that team's form to be waning, decided to race his own cars in 1966.

== Racing history: Formula One ==
=== Overview ===
The team began life as a Formula One constructor in 1963 by Bruce McLaren. The team's maiden Grand Prix victory was at the 1968 Belgian Grand Prix. After Bruce McLaren died in a testing accident in 1970, Teddy Mayer took over and led the team to their first Formula One Constructors' Championship in 1974, with Emerson Fittipaldi and James Hunt winning the Drivers' Championship in 1974 and 1976 respectively. The year 1974 also marked the start of a long-standing sponsorship by the Marlboro cigarette brand.

In 1981, McLaren merged with Ron Dennis' Project Four Racing; Dennis took over as team principal, and shortly afterwards organised a buyout of the original McLaren shareholders to take full control of the team. This began the team's most successful era; with Porsche and Honda engines, Niki Lauda, Alain Prost, and Ayrton Senna won seven Drivers' Championships between them and the team took six Constructors' Championships. The combination of Prost and Senna was particularly dominant – together they won all but one race in 1988 – but later their rivalry soured and Prost left for Ferrari. Fellow English team Williams offered the most consistent challenge during this period, the two winning every constructors' title between 1984 and 1994. By the mid-1990s, Honda had withdrawn from Formula One, Senna had moved to Williams, and the team went three seasons without a win. With Mercedes-Benz engines, West sponsorship, and former Williams designer Adrian Newey, further championships came in 1998 and 1999 with driver Mika Häkkinen, and during the 2000s the team were consistent front-runners, with Lewis Hamilton winning the 2008 drivers' title.

Ron Dennis retired as McLaren team principal in 2009, handing over to long-time McLaren employee Martin Whitmarsh. At the end of 2013, after the team's worst season since 2004, Whitmarsh was ousted. McLaren announced in 2013 that they would be using Honda engines from 2015 onwards, replacing Mercedes-Benz. The team raced as McLaren Honda for the first time since 1992 at the 2015 Australian Grand Prix. The second Honda partnership did not yield good results, and in September 2017, McLaren announced they had agreed on an engine supply with Renault from 2018 to 2020. McLaren returned to using Mercedes-Benz engines from the 2021 season, with a deal in place until at least 2030. After a period of time in the midfield, McLaren surged to fourth in the Constructors' Championship in 2023 after having started that year on the back foot. They would go on to win their ninth Constructors' Championship, and first since 1998, in 2024. The following year, Lando Norris took the team's most recent drivers' title, and first since 2008, and secured their tenth Constructors' Championship title and their second consecutive title; the first time this had happened since 1991. This result made McLaren the second-most successful Formula One team of all time in terms of Constructors' Championships won.

=== 1966–1968: Early beginnings ===
McLaren's original logo was designed by Michael Turner and featured a kiwi bird, a New Zealand icon.

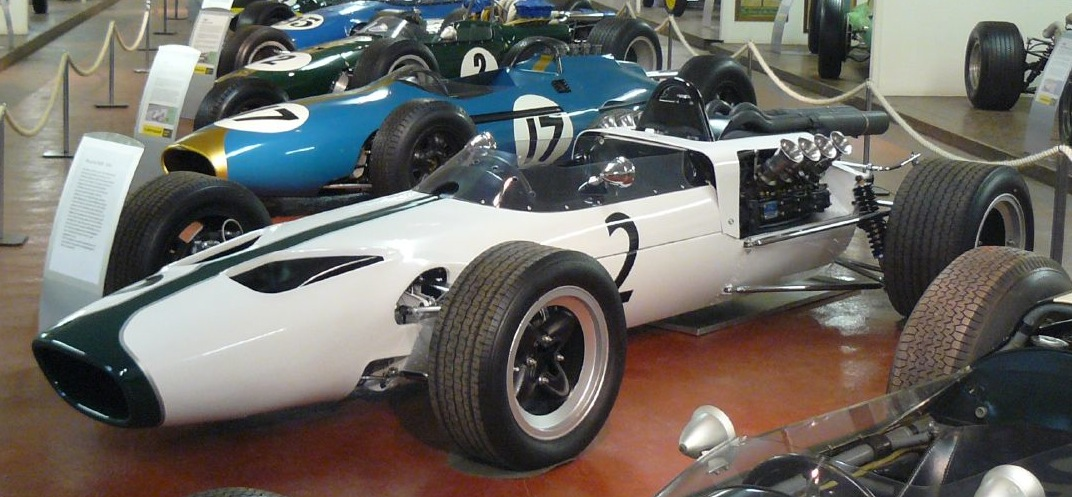
The McLaren M2B, the team's first Formula One car

Bruce McLaren made the team's Grand Prix debut at the 1966 Monaco Grand Prix (of the current Formula One teams, only Ferrari is older). (Note: Current team Mercedes first competed in 1954–1955, but did not race again until 2010.) His race ended after nine laps due to a terminal oil leak. The 1966 car was the M2B designed by Robin Herd, but the programme was hampered by a poor choice of engines: a 3.0-litre version of Ford's Indianapolis 500 engine and a Serenissima V8 were used, the latter scoring the team's first point in Britain, but both were underpowered and unreliable. For 1967 Bruce decided to use a British Racing Motors (BRM) V12 engine, but due to delays with the engine, was forced initially to use a modified Formula Two car called the M4B powered by a 2.0-litre BRM V8, later building a similar but slightly larger car called the M5A for the V12. Neither car brought great success, the best result being a fourth at Monaco.

=== 1968–1982: Ford-Cosworth DFV engines ===
For 1968, after driving McLaren's sole entry for the previous two years, Bruce was joined by 1967 champion and fellow New Zealander Denny Hulme, who was already racing for McLaren in Can-Am. That year's new M7A car, Herd's final design for the team, was powered by Cosworth's new and soon to be ubiquitous DFV engine (the DFV would go on to be used by McLaren until 1983) and with it a major upturn in form proceeded. Bruce won the Race of Champions at the Brands Hatch circuit and Hulme won the International Trophy at Silverstone, both non-championship races, before Bruce took the team's first championship win at the Belgian Grand Prix. Hulme also won the Italian and Canadian Grands Prix later in the year, helping the team to second in the Constructors' Championship. Using an updated 'C' version on the M7, a further three podium finishes followed for Bruce in 1969, but the team's fifth win had to wait until the last race of the 1969 championship when Hulme won the Mexican Grand Prix. That year, McLaren experimented with four-wheel drive in the M9A, but the car had only a single outing driven by Derek Bell at the British Grand Prix; Bruce described driving it as like "trying to write your signature with somebody jogging your elbow".

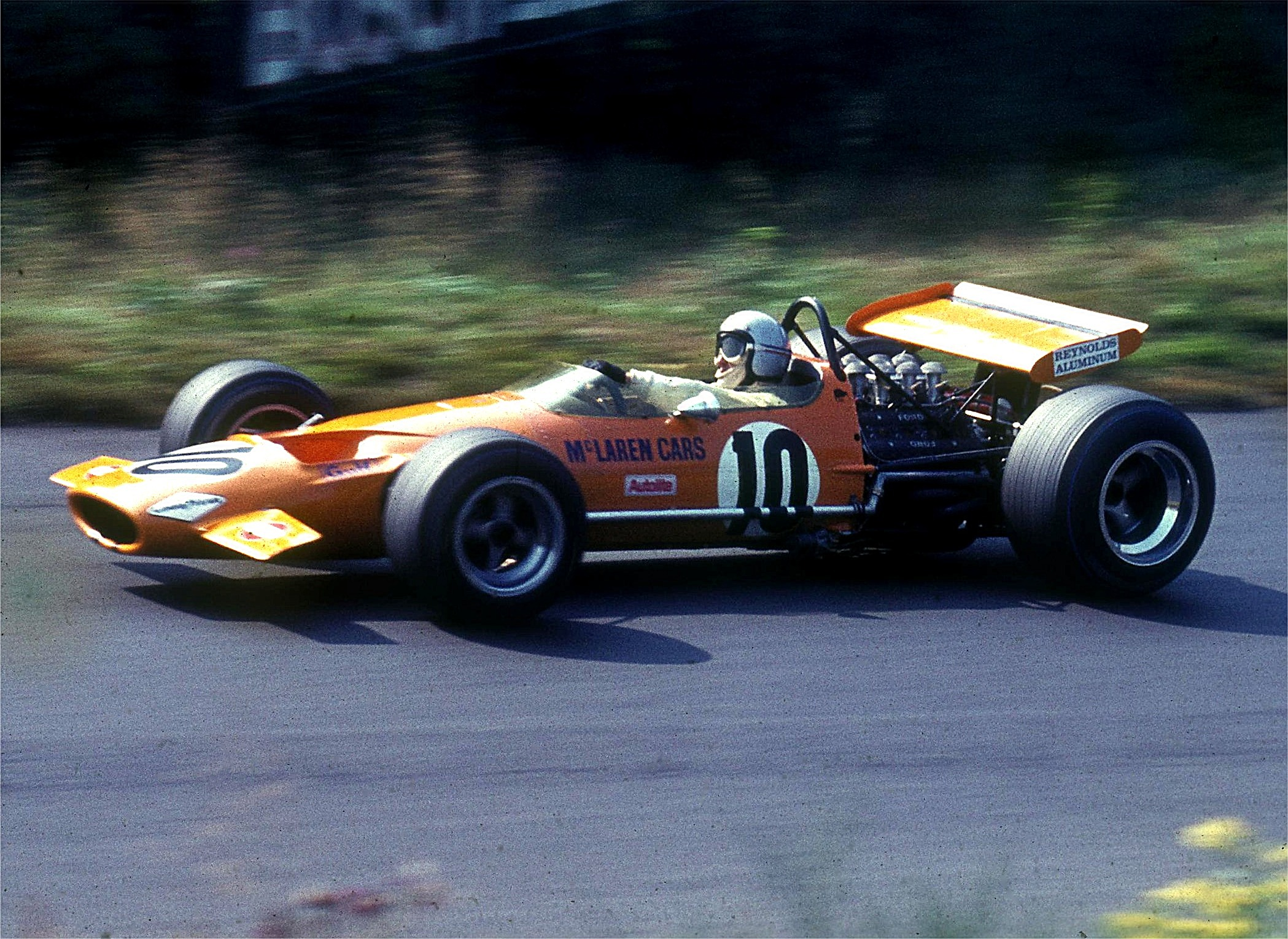
The McLaren M7A of 1968 gave McLaren their first Formula One wins. It is driven here by Bruce McLaren at the Nürburgring in 1969.

The year 1970 started with a second-place each for Hulme and Bruce in the first two Grands Prix, but in June, Bruce was killed in a crash at Goodwood while testing the new M8D Can-Am car. After his death, Teddy Mayer took over effective control of the team; Hulme continued with Dan Gurney and Peter Gethin partnering him. Gurney won the first two Can-Am events at Mosport and St. Jovite and placed ninth in the third, but left the team mid-season, and Gethin took over from there. While 1971 began promisingly when Hulme led the opening round in South Africa before retiring with broken suspension, ultimately Hulme, Gethin (who left for BRM mid-season,) and Jackie Oliver again failed to score a win. The 1972 season saw improvements though: Hulme won the team's first Grand Prix for 2 1/2 years in South Africa and he and Peter Revson scored ten other podiums, the team finishing third in the Constructors' Championship. McLaren gave Jody Scheckter his Formula One debut at the final race at Watkins Glen. All McLaren drivers used the Ford-Cosworth engines, except for Andrea de Adamich and Nanni Galli who used engines from Alfa Romeo in 1970.

==== 1973–1981: Hunt–Lauda era and transition ====
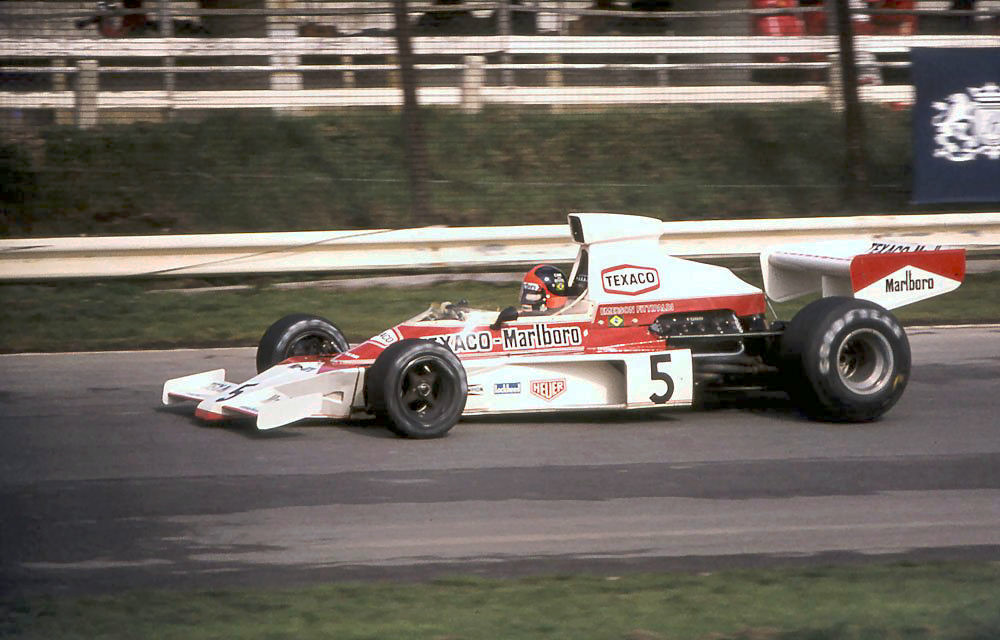
Emerson Fittipaldi won the 1974 Drivers' Championship with McLaren.

The McLaren M23, designed by Gordon Coppuck, was the team's new car for the 1973 season. Sharing parts of the design of both McLaren's Formula One M19 and Indianapolis M16 cars (itself inspired by Lotus's 72), it was a mainstay for four years. Hulme won with it in Sweden and Revson took the only Grand Prix wins of his career in Britain and Canada. In 1974, Emerson Fittipaldi, world champion with Lotus two years earlier, joined McLaren. Hulme, in his final Formula One campaign, won the Argentinian season-opener; Fittipaldi, with wins in Brazil, Belgium and Canada, took the Drivers' Championship. It was a close fight for Fittipaldi, who secured the title with a fourth at the season-ending United States Grand Prix, putting him three points ahead of Ferrari's Clay Regazzoni. With Hulme and multiple motorcycle world champion Mike Hailwood, he also sealed McLaren's first Constructors' Championship. The year 1975 was less successful for the team: Fittipaldi was second in the championship behind Niki Lauda. Hulme's replacement Jochen Mass took his sole GP win in Spain.

At the end of 1975, Fittipaldi left to join his brother's Fittipaldi/Copersucar team. With the top drivers already signed to other teams, Mayer turned to James Hunt, a driver on whom biographer Gerald Donaldson reflected as having "a dubious reputation". In 1976, Lauda was again strong in his Ferrari; at midseason, he led the championship with 56 points while Hunt had only 26 despite wins in Spain (a race from which he was initially disqualified) and France. At the German Grand Prix, though, Lauda crashed heavily, was nearly killed, and missed the next two races. Hunt capitalised by winning four more Grands Prix giving him a three-point deficit going into the finale in Japan. Here it rained torrentially, Lauda retired because of safety concerns, and Hunt sealed the Drivers' Championship by finishing third. McLaren, though, lost the Constructors' Championship to Ferrari.

In 1977, the M23 was gradually replaced with the M26, the M23's final works outing being Gilles Villeneuve's Formula One debut with the team in a one-off appearance at the British Grand Prix. Hunt won on three occasions that year, but the Lauda and Ferrari combination proved too strong, Hunt and McLaren managing just fifth and third in the respective championships. From there, results continued to worsen. Lotus and Mario Andretti took the 1978 titles with their 78 and 79 ground-effect cars and neither Hunt nor Mass's replacement Patrick Tambay were able to seriously challenge with the nonground-effect M26. Hunt was dropped at the end of 1978 in favour of Lotus's Ronnie Peterson, but when Peterson was killed by a crash at the Italian Grand Prix, John Watson was signed, instead. No improvement occurred in 1979; Coppuck's M28 design was described by Mayer as "ghastly, a disaster" and "quite diabolical" and the M29 did little to change the situation. Tambay scored no points and Watson only 15 to place the team eighth at the end of the year.

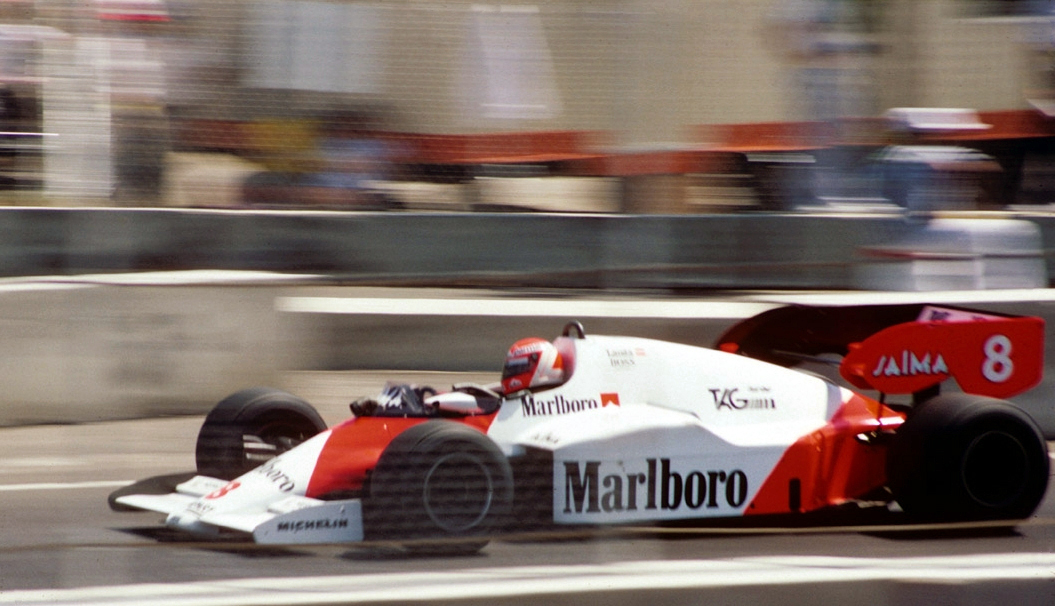
Five years after his first retirement, Lauda won his third title driving a McLaren MP4/2.

The 1980s started much as the 1970s had ended: Alain Prost took over from Tambay but Watson and he rarely scored points. Under increasing pressure since the previous year from principal sponsor Philip Morris and their executive John Hogan, Mayer was coerced into merging McLaren with Ron Dennis's Project Four Formula Two team, also sponsored by Philip Morris. Dennis had designer John Barnard who, inspired by the carbon-fibre rear wings of the BMW M1 race cars that Project Four was preparing, had ideas for a Formula One chassis constructed entirely from carbon-fibre instead of conventional aluminium alloy. On their own, they lacked the money to build it, but with investment that came with the merger it became the McLaren MP4 (later called MP4/1) of 1981, driven by Watson and Andrea de Cesaris. In the MP4, Watson won the British Grand Prix and had three other podium finishes. Soon after the merger, McLaren moved from Colnbrook to a new base in Woking and Dennis and Mayer initially shared the managing directorship of the company; by 1982, Mayer had departed and Tyler Alexander's and his shareholdings had been bought by the new owners.

=== 1983–1992: TAG-Porsche and Honda engines ===
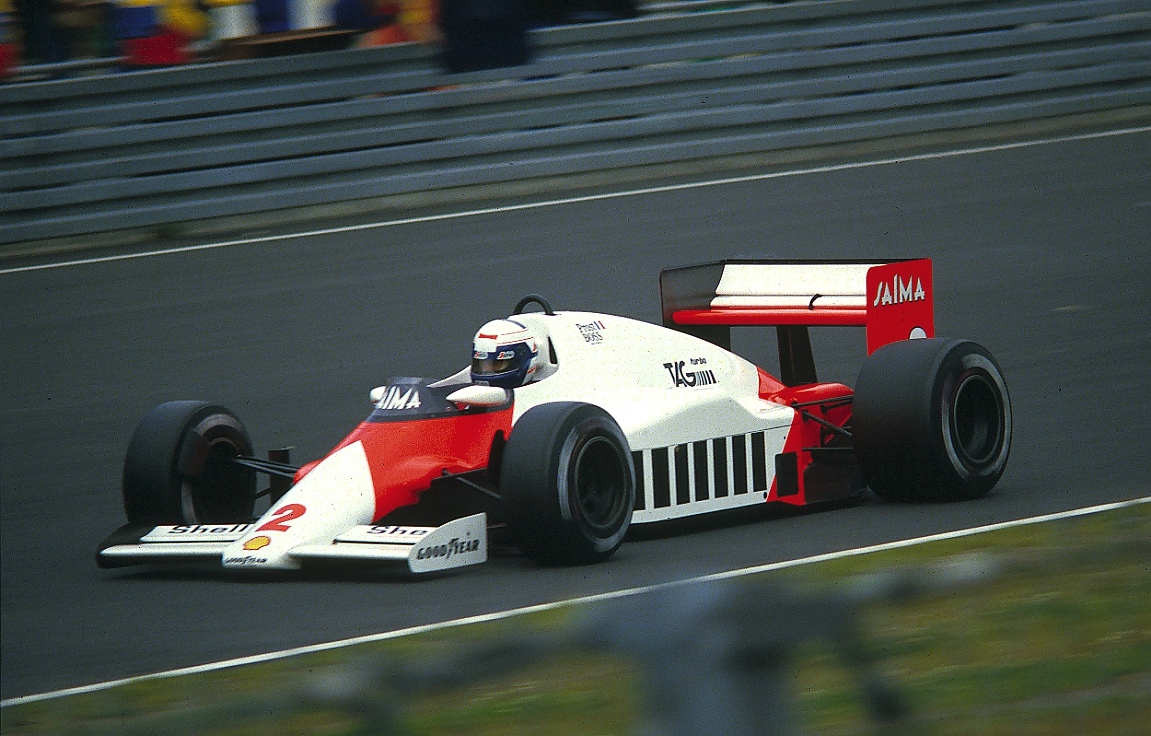
Alain Prost, pictured at the 1985 German Grand Prix, won three Drivers' Championships with McLaren.

In the early 1980s, teams like Renault, Ferrari and Brabham were using 1.5-litre turbocharged engines in favour of the 3.0-litre naturally aspirated engines that had been standard since 1966. Having seen in 1982 the need for a turbo engine of their own, Dennis had convinced Williams backer Techniques d'Avant Garde (TAG) to fund Porsche-built, TAG-branded turbo engines made to Barnard's specifications; TAG's founder Mansour Ojjeh would later become a McLaren shareholder. In the meantime, they continued with Cosworth engines as old rival Lauda came out of retirement in 1982 to drive alongside Watson in that year's 1B development of the MP4. They each won two races, Watson won from 17th on the grid in Detroit, and at one stage of the season McLaren were second in the constructors' championship. As part of a dispute with FISA, they boycotted the San Marino Grand Prix. Although 1983 was not so fruitful, Watson did win again in the United States, this time from 22nd on the grid at Long Beach.

Having been fired by Renault, Prost returned to McLaren once again for 1984. Now using the TAG engines, the team dominated, scoring 12 wins and 2 1/2 times as many constructors' points as nearest rival Ferrari. In the Drivers' Championship, Lauda prevailed over Prost by half a point, the narrowest margin ever. The McLaren-TAGs were again strong in 1985; a third Constructors' Championship came their way while this time Prost won the Drivers' Championship. In 1986, the Williams team were resurgent with their Honda engine and drivers Nigel Mansell and Nelson Piquet, while at McLaren, Lauda's replacement, 1982 champion Keke Rosberg could not gel with the car. Williams took the Constructors' Championship, but for Prost, wins in San Marino, Monaco, and Austria combined with the fact that the Williams drivers were taking points from each other meant that he retained a chance going into the last race, the Australian Grand Prix. There, a puncture for Mansell and a precautionary pit stop for Piquet gave Prost the race win and his second title, making him the first driver to win back-to-back championships since Jack Brabham in 1959 and 1960. In 1987 Barnard departed for Ferrari to be replaced by Gordon Murray as Technical Director, with Steve Nichols (who himself joined Ferrari in 1989) remaining as Chief Designer. In the hands of Prost and Stefan Johansson, though, Nichols's MP4/3 and the TAG engine could not match the Williams-Honda.

==== 1988–1991: Domination with Honda ====
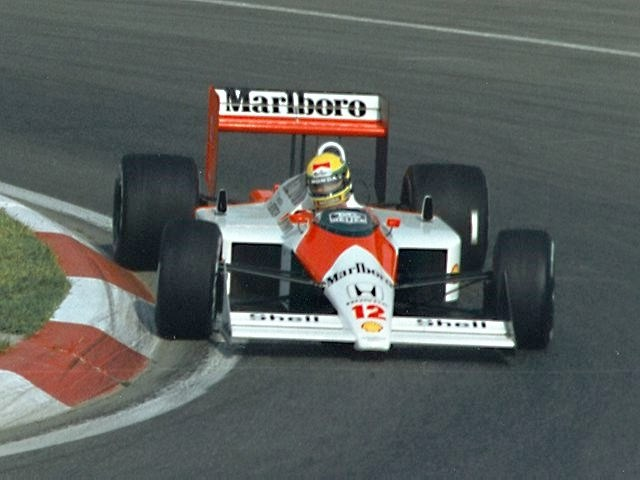
Equipped with Honda engines and the driving strength of Prost and Ayrton Senna for 1988, McLaren dominated the season, winning all but one race. Senna won his first world championship after a season-long battle with Prost.

For 1988, Honda switched their factory supply to McLaren and, encouraged by Prost, Dennis signed Ayrton Senna to drive. Despite regulations reducing the boost pressure and fuel capacity (and therefore, power) of the turbo cars, Honda persisted with a turbocharged engine. In the MP4/4, Senna and Prost engaged in a season-long battle, winning 15 of the 16 races (at the other race at Monza, Senna had been leading comfortably, but collided with back-marker Jean-Louis Schlesser). At the Portuguese Grand Prix, their relationship soured when Senna squeezed Prost against the pit wall; Prost won, but afterwards said, "It was dangerous. If he wants the world championship that badly he can have it." Prost scored more points that year, but because only the best 11 results counted, Senna took the title at the penultimate race in Japan.

The next year, with turbos banned, Honda supplied a new 3.5-L naturally aspirated V10 engine and McLaren again won both titles with the MP4/5. Their drivers' relationship continued to deteriorate, though, especially when, at the San Marino Grand Prix, Prost felt that Senna had reneged on an agreement not to pass each other at the first corner. Believing that Honda and Dennis were favouring Senna, Prost announced mid-season that he would leave to drive at Ferrari the following year. For the second year in succession, the Drivers' Championship was decided at the Japanese Grand Prix, this time in Prost's favour after Senna and he collided (Senna initially recovered and won the race, but was later disqualified).

With former McLaren men Nichols and Prost (Barnard had moved to the Benetton team), Ferrari pushed the British team more closely in 1990. McLaren, in turn, brought in Ferrari's Gerhard Berger, but like the two seasons before, the Drivers' Championship was led by Prost and Senna and settled at the penultimate race in Japan. Here, Senna collided with Prost at the first corner, forcing both to retire, but this time Senna escaped punishment and took the title; McLaren also won the Constructors' Championship. The 1991 year was another for McLaren and Senna, with the ascendant Renault-powered Williams team their closest challengers. By 1992, Williams, with their advanced FW14B car, had overtaken McLaren, breaking their four-year run as champions, despite the latter winning five races that year.

=== 1993–1994: Ford, Lamborghini and Peugeot engines ===
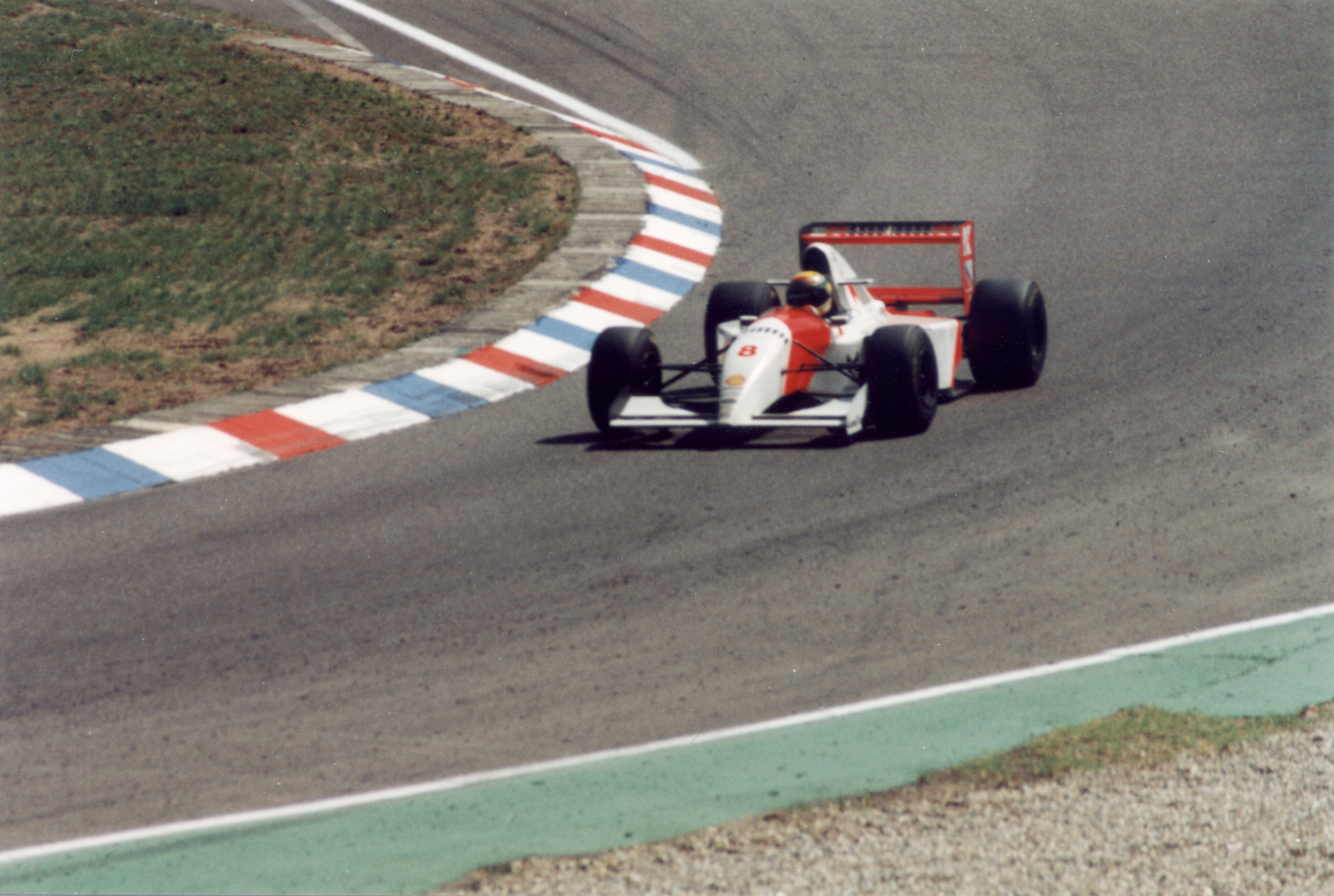
By 1993, Honda had withdrawn from F1 and the team used underpowered Ford V8 engines to power the MP4/8. Although Ayrton Senna (pictured at the 1993 German Grand Prix) won five races, McLaren was not a match for the dominant Williams team. After the 1993 Australian Grand Prix, the team failed to win a race until 1997.

As Honda withdrew from the sport at end of 1992 following the Japanese asset price bubble in Japan, McLaren sought a new engine supplier. A deal to secure Renault engines fell through due to being vetoed by Renault's fuel and lubricant supplier Elf Aquitaine, subsequently McLaren switched to customer Ford engines for the 1993 season. Senna – who initially agreed only to a race-by-race contract before later signing for the whole year – won five races, including a record-breaking sixth victory at Monaco and a win at the European Grand Prix, where he went from fifth to first on the opening lap. His teammate, 1991 CART champion Michael Andretti, fared much worse; he scored only seven points, and was replaced by test driver Mika Häkkinen for the final three rounds of the season. Williams ultimately won both titles and Senna – who had flirted with moving there for 1993 – signed with them for the 1994 season. During the 1993 season McLaren took part in a seven part BBC Television documentary called A Season With McLaren.

McLaren tested a Lamborghini V12 engine ahead of the 1994 season, as part of a potential deal with the then-Lamborghini owner Chrysler, before eventually deciding to use full-works Peugeot engines. With Peugeot power, the MP4/9 was driven by Häkkinen and Martin Brundle, despite achieving eight podiums over the season no wins were achieved. Peugeot was dropped after a single year due to multiple engine failures/unreliability which cost McLaren potential race victories and they switched to a Mercedes-Benz-branded, Ilmor-designed engine.

=== 1995–2014: First Mercedes partnership ===
==== 1995–2009: Factory Mercedes partnership ====
For 1995 season onwards, McLaren ended their engine deal with Peugeot Sport and started an engine full-works partnership with Mercedes-Benz High Performance Engines for the first time, after the German manufacturer spent one year in partnership with the then-youngest Sauber team. The partnership included bespoke free engines from Mercedes-Benz that built, assembled and tuned by Ilmor Engineering in Brixworth, England, Mercedes-Benz official team vehicles, financial support, also earned full-factory support from Daimler AG and Mercedes-Benz and also Mercedes-Benz and Ilmor staffs would work with the team at their Woking base.

McLaren's Formula One car for the 1995 season, the MP4/10, was not a front-runner and Brundle's replacement, former champion Nigel Mansell, was unable to fit into the car at first and departed after just two races, with Mark Blundell taking his place.

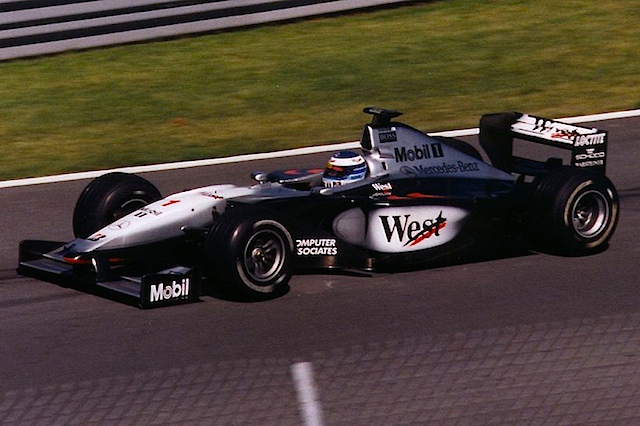
Mika Häkkinen (pictured at the 1999 Canadian Grand Prix) won the 1998 and 1999 Drivers' Championships with McLaren.

While Williams dominated in 1996, McLaren, now with David Coulthard alongside Häkkinen, went a third successive season without a win. In 1997, however, Coulthard broke this run by winning the season-opening Australian Grand Prix; Häkkinen and he would each win another race before the end of the season, and highly rated designer Adrian Newey joined the team from Williams in August that year. Despite the car's improved pace, unreliability proved costly throughout the season, with retirements at the British and Luxembourg Grands Prix occurring whilst Häkkinen was in the lead. It was also at the start of this season that saw long time sponsor, Marlboro, shift its support to long time rival Ferrari. For the first time since the 1974 season, McLaren would have a new identity, shifting to fellow tobacco sponsor West. This saw the traditional red and white replaced with silver, grey, white and red. McLaren would retain this colour scheme (or very similar) for twenty years until 2017.

With Newey able to take advantage of new technical regulations for 1998, and with Williams losing their works Renault engines following Renault's temporary withdrawal from the sport, McLaren were once again able to challenge for the championship. Häkkinen and Coulthard won five of the first six races despite the banning of the team's "brake steer" system, which allowed the rear brakes to be operated individually to reduce understeer, after a protest by Ferrari at the second race in Brazil. Schumacher and Ferrari provided the greatest competition, the former levelled on points with Häkkinen with two races to go, but wins for Häkkinen at the Luxembourg and Japanese Grands Prix gave both him the Drivers' Championship and McLaren the Constructors' Championship. Häkkinen won his second Drivers' Championship the following season, but due to a combination of driver errors and mechanical failures, the team lost the constructors' title to Ferrari.

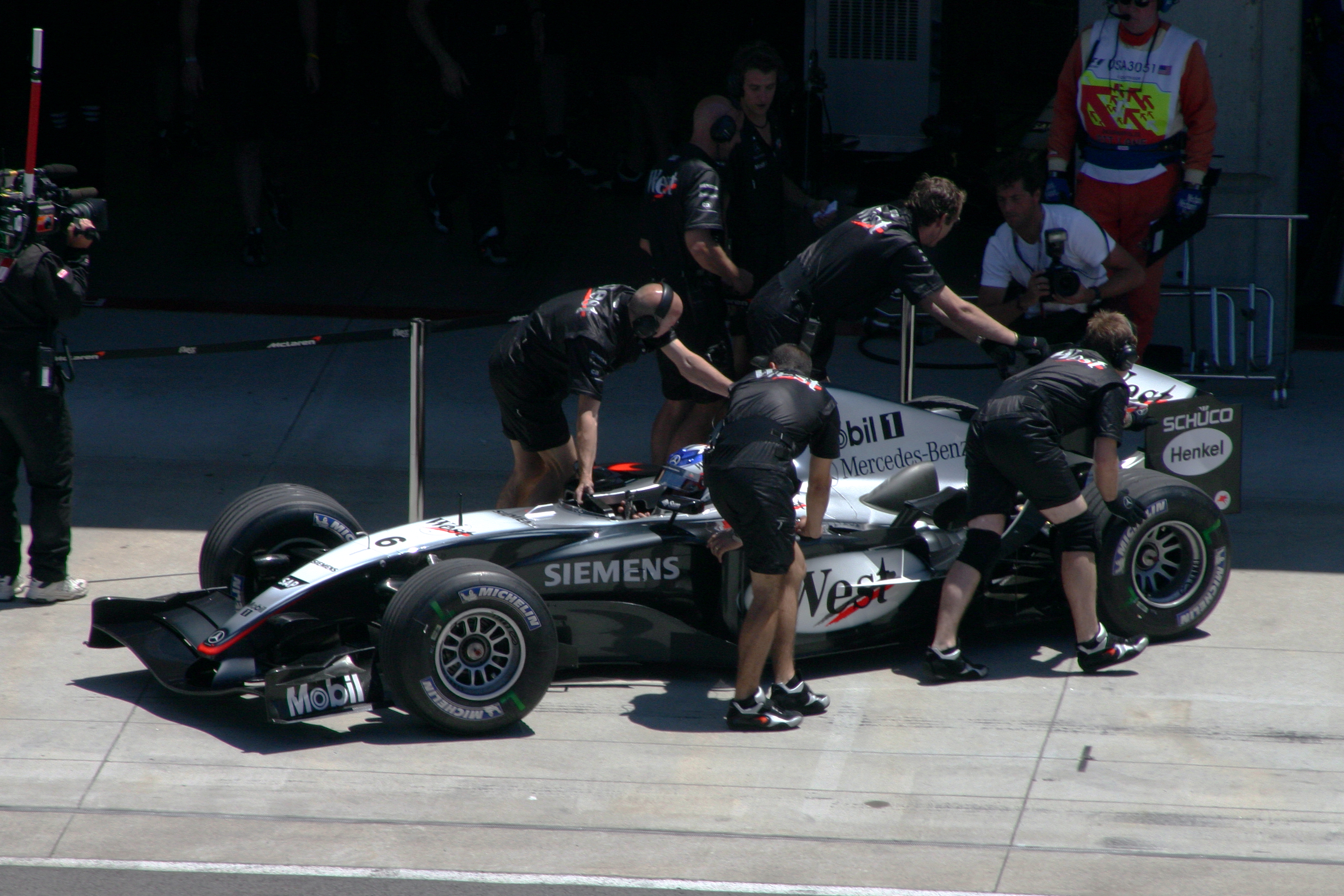
Mechanics pushing Kimi Räikkönen's MP4-19 into the garage during qualifying for the 2004 United States Grand Prix

In 2000 McLaren won seven races in a close fight with Ferrari, but ultimately Ferrari and Schumacher prevailed in both competitions. This marked the start of a decline in form as Ferrari cemented their dominance in Formula One. In 2001, Häkkinen was outscored by Coulthard for the first time since 1997 and retired (ending Formula One's longest ever driver partnership), his place taken by Kimi Räikkönen, then in 2002, Coulthard took their solitary win at Monaco while Ferrari repeated McLaren's 1988 feat of 15 wins in a season.

The year 2003 started promisingly to coincide with Mercedes-Benz's 10th consecutive season in Formula One as an engine supplier only, with one win each for Coulthard and Räikkönen at the first two Grands Prix. However, they were hampered when the MP4-18 car designed for that year suffered crash test and reliability problems, forcing them to continue using a 'D' development of the year-old MP4-17 for longer than they had initially planned. Despite this, Räikkönen scored points consistently and challenged for the championship up to the final race, eventually losing by two points. The team began 2004 with the MP4-19, which technical director Adrian Newey described as "a debugged version of [the MP4-18]". It was not a success, though, and was replaced mid-season by the MP4-19B. With this, Räikkönen scored the team's and his only win of the year at the Belgian Grand Prix, as McLaren finished fifth in the Constructors' Championship, their worst ranking since 1983.

Coulthard left for Red Bull Racing in 2005 to be replaced by former CART champion Juan Pablo Montoya for what was McLaren's most successful season in several years as he and Räikkönen won ten races. However, both the team not being able to work out why the car could not heat its tyres properly in the early stages of the season and the overall unreliability of the MP4-20 cost several race victories when Räikkönen had been leading or in contention to win and also costing him grid positions in some qualifying sessions, which allowed Renault and their driver Fernando Alonso to capitalise and win both titles.

In 2006, the superior reliability and speed of the Ferraris and Renaults prevented the team from gaining any victories for the first time in a decade. Montoya parted company acrimoniously with the team to race in NASCAR after the United States Grand Prix, where he crashed into Räikkönen at the start; test driver Pedro de la Rosa deputised for the remainder of the season. The team also lost Räikkönen to Ferrari at the end of the year.

Steve Matchett argued that the poor reliability of McLaren in 2006 and recent previous years was due to a lack of team continuity and stability. His cited examples of instability are logistical challenges related to the move to the McLaren Technology Centre, Adrian Newey's aborted move to Jaguar and later move to Red Bull, the subsequent move of Newey's deputy to Red Bull, and personnel changes at Ilmor.

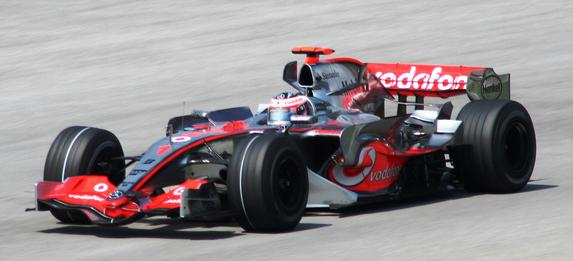
2007 saw McLaren marred with controversy, including "spygate" and tension between the team's drivers, Fernando Alonso (pictured) and Lewis Hamilton.

After scoring no victories in 2006, the team returned to competitive status in 2007. That year saw Fernando Alonso race alongside Formula One debutant and long-time McLaren protégé Lewis Hamilton. The pair scored four wins each and led the Drivers' Championship for much of the year, but tensions arose within the team, BBC Sport claimed that Alonso was unable to cope with Hamilton's competitiveness. At the Hungarian Grand Prix, Alonso was judged to have deliberately impeded his teammate during qualifying, so the team were not allowed to score Constructors' points at the event. An internal agreement within the McLaren team stated that drivers would alternatively have an extra lap for qualifying, however, Lewis Hamilton refused to accept for the Hungarian Grand Prix. Subsequently, the McLaren team was investigated by the FIA for having proprietary technical blueprints of Ferrari's car – the so-called "Spygate" controversy. At the first hearing, McLaren management consistently denied all knowledge, blaming a single "rogue engineer". However, in the final hearing, McLaren was found guilty and the team was excluded from the Constructors' Championship and fined $100 million. The drivers were allowed to continue without penalty, and while Hamilton led the Drivers' Championship heading into the final race in Brazil, Räikkönen in the Ferrari won the race and the Drivers' Championship, a single point ahead of both McLaren drivers. In November, Alonso and McLaren agreed to terminate their contract by mutual consent, Heikki Kovalainen filling the vacant seat alongside Hamilton.

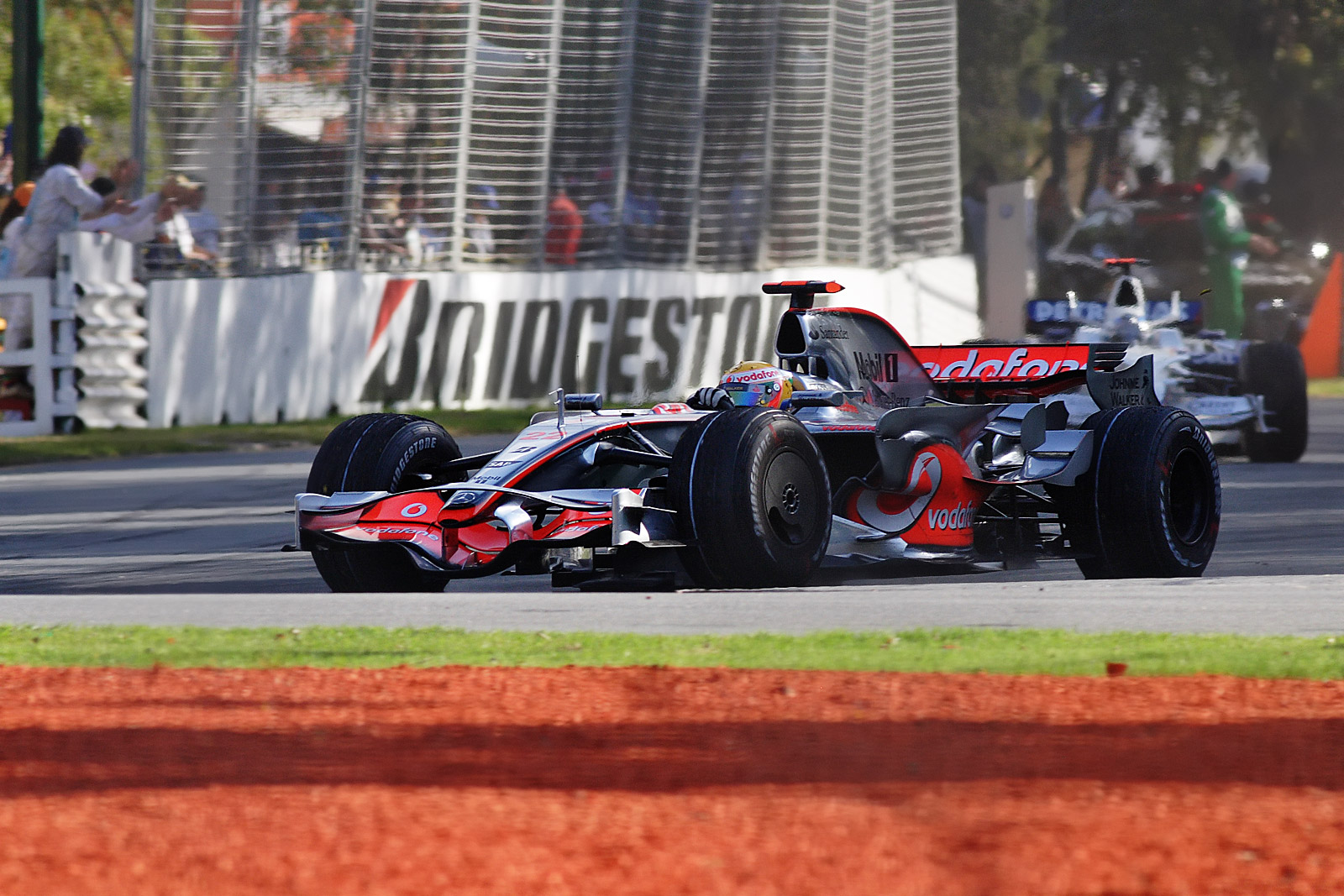
Lewis Hamilton won 2008's season-opening race in Australia and went on to win the title.

In 2008, a close fight ensued between Hamilton and the Ferraris of Felipe Massa and Räikkönen; Hamilton won five times and despite also crossing the finish line first at the Belgian Grand Prix, he was deemed to have gained an illegal advantage by cutting a chicane during an overtake and was controversially demoted to third. Going into the final race in Brazil, Hamilton had a seven-point lead over Massa. Massa won there, but Hamilton dramatically clinched his first Drivers' Championship by moving into the necessary fifth position at the final corner of the final lap of the race. Despite winning his first Grand Prix in Hungary, Kovalainen finished the season only seventh in the overall standings, allowing Ferrari to take the constructors' title.

Before the start of the 2009 season, Dennis retired as team principal, handing responsibility to Martin Whitmarsh, but the year started badly: the MP4-24 car was off the pace and the team was given a three-race suspended ban for misleading stewards at the Australian and Malaysian Grands Prix. Despite these early problems, a late revival had Hamilton win at the Hungarian and Singapore Grands Prix.

==== 2010–2014: Customer Mercedes engines ====
For the 2010 season, McLaren lost its status as the Mercedes works team; Mercedes decided to buy the Brackley-based Brawn team that had won the 2009 titles with its customer engines, Whitmarsh having chosen to abandon their exclusive rights to the Mercedes engines to help Brawn run. Mercedes still continued providing engines to McLaren, albeit under a supplier-customer relationship rather than the works partnership as before, while it sold its 40% shares of McLaren over two years but instead Mercedes remained supplying free engines for McLaren team until 2012. McLaren signed 2009 champion, Jenson Button, to replace Kovalainen alongside Hamilton in 2010. Button won twice (in Australia and China) and Hamilton three times (in Turkey, Canada, and Belgium), but they and McLaren failed to win their respective championships, that year's MP4-25 largely outpaced by Red Bull's RB6.

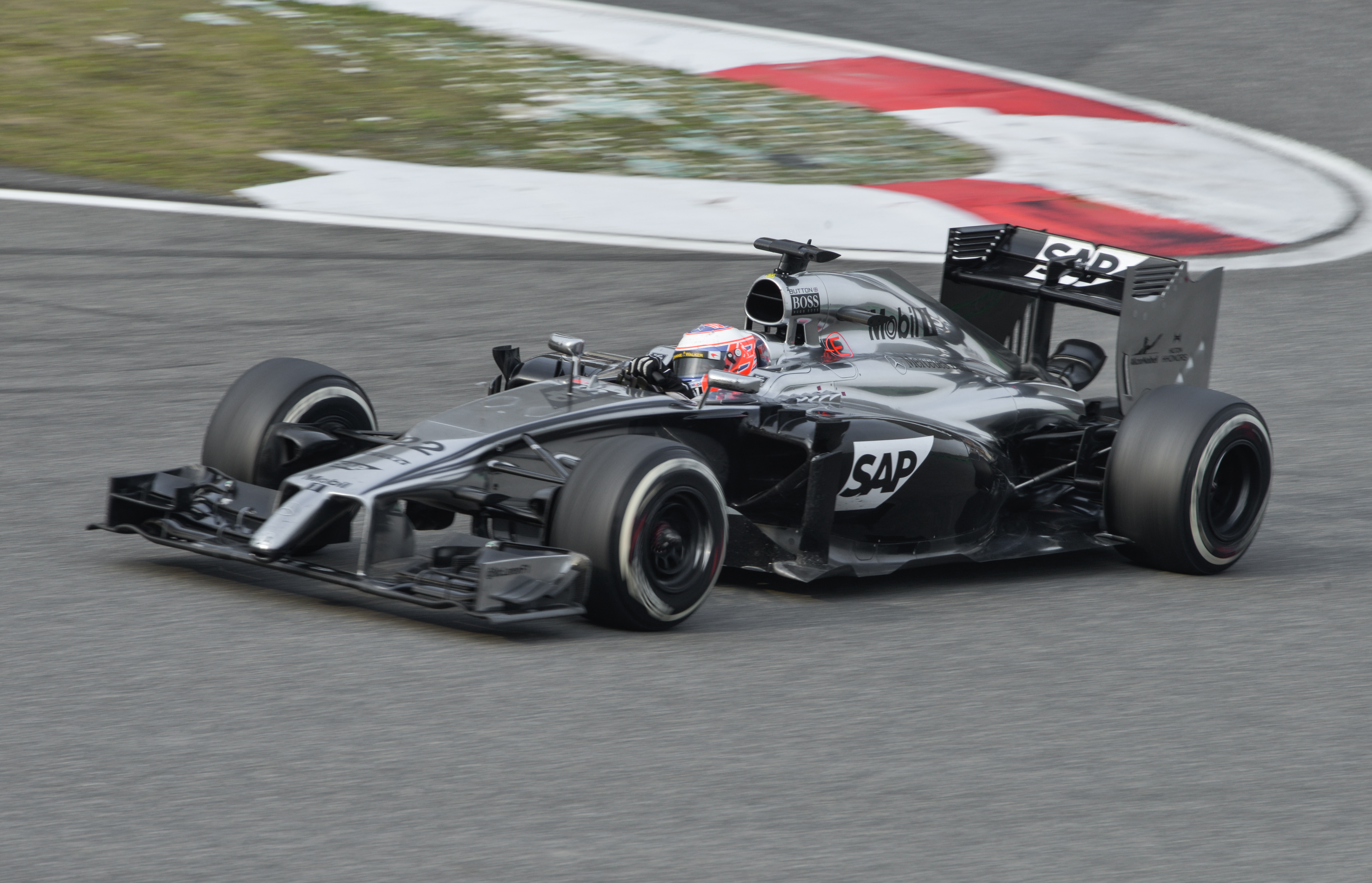
Jenson Button driving at the 2014 Chinese Grand Prix

Hamilton and Button remained with the team into 2011, with Hamilton winning three races – China, Germany, and Abu Dhabi and Button also winning three races – Canada, Hungary, and Japan. Button finished the Drivers' Championship in second place with 270 points behind 2011 Drivers' Champion Sebastian Vettel of Red Bull Racing, ahead of Hamilton's 227 points. McLaren was second in the Constructors' Championship to Red Bull Racing. Throughout the season, Hamilton was involved in several incidents with other drivers including multiple collisions with 2008 title rival Massa.

In 2012, McLaren won the first race of the year in Australia with a dominant victory by Button and a 3rd place from pole for Hamilton, while Hamilton went on to win in Canada, but by the mid-way mark of the season at the team's home race at Silverstone, the McLaren cars managed only eighth place (Hamilton) and 10th place (Button), while the drivers' and Constructors' Championships were being dominated by Red Bull Racing and Ferrari, whose cars occupied the first four places of the British Grand Prix, this was partially due to pit stop problems and Button's temporary dip in form after not adapting as well as Hamilton to the new Pirelli tyres. The car also suffered reliability problems which cost the team and its drivers numerous potential points, including in Singapore and Abu Dhabi, where Hamilton had been leading both races and in Italy where the team lost a 1-2 finish when Button's car failed with fuel problems on lap 33.

Sergio Pérez replaced Hamilton for 2013, after Hamilton decided to leave for Mercedes. However, from 2013 to 2014 seasons McLaren's Mercedes links were weaker due to Mercedes focused on its own works team. For eighteen seasons McLaren utilized bespoke free works engines, however from 2013, McLaren had to pay for Mercedes engines. The team's car for the season, the MP4-28, was launched on 31 January 2013. The car struggled to compete with the other top teams and the season had McLaren fail to produce a podium finish for the first time since 1980.

Kevin Magnussen replaced Pérez for 2014, and Ron Dennis, who had remained at arm's length since stepping down from the team principal role, returned as CEO of the operation. McLaren was the first team to officially launch their 2014 car, the MP4-29, which was revealed on 24 January 2014. They had a largely unsuccessful 2014; their best result was in Australia where – after Daniel Ricciardo's disqualification from second place – Magnussen finished second and Button third. Button subsequently finished fourth in Canada, Britain, and Russia. Their highest grid position was in Britain with Button's third place on the grid.

=== 2015–2017: Return to Honda engines ===
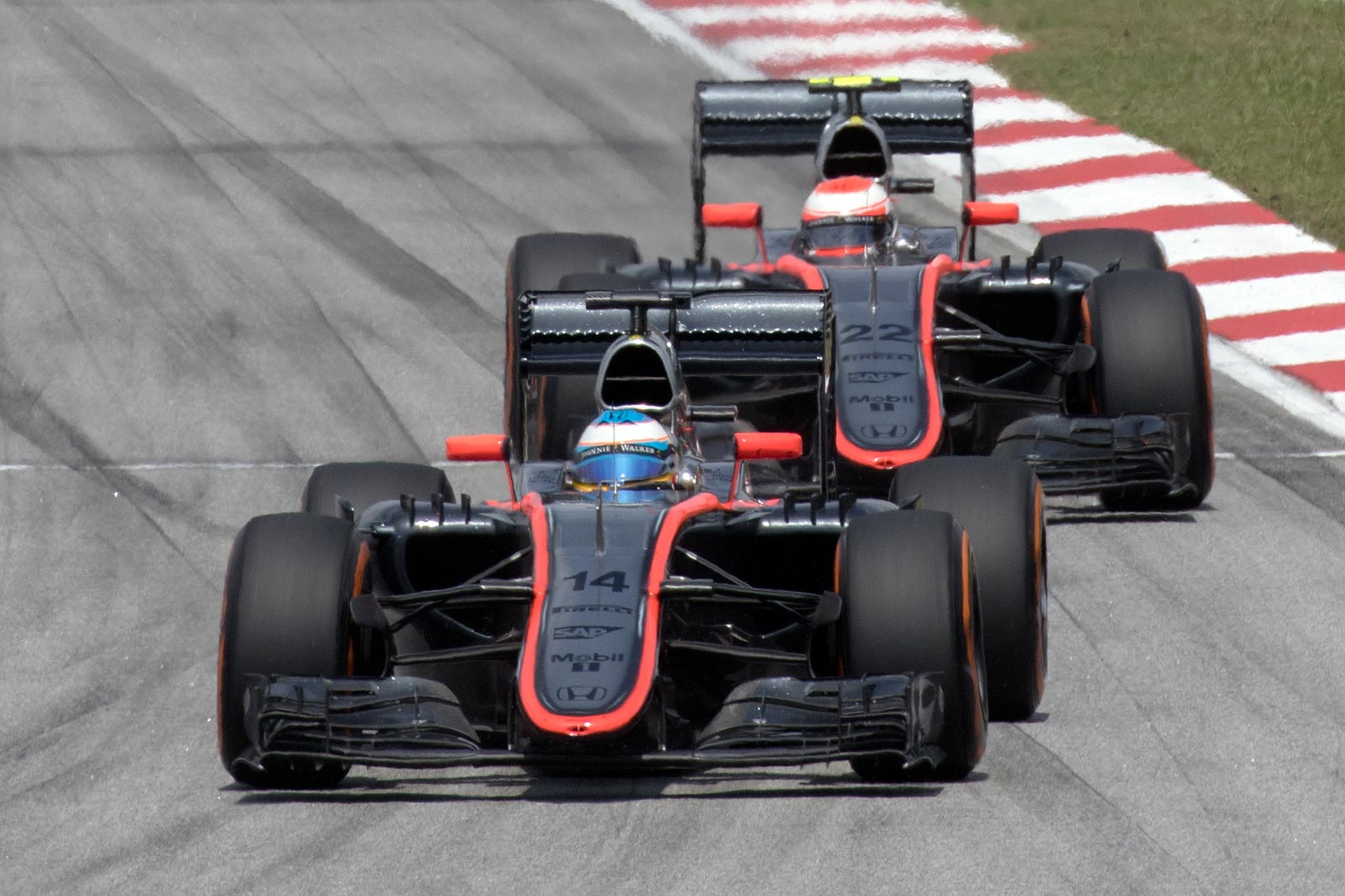
The 2015 season was McLaren's first since 1991 to use Honda engines, but their performance was lacking and their reliability poor as the team finished ninth in the Constructors' Championship.

For 2015, McLaren ended their engine deal with Mercedes which included buying back the 40% stake that Mercedes held in the team and reforging their historical partnership with Honda. The Honda deal not only meant they would supply engines, but that Honda staff would work with the team at their Woking base as well as received full-factory support from Honda including official team vehicles and free engines. The team announced Fernando Alonso and Jenson Button as their race drivers, with Kevin Magnussen demoted to test driver. During pre-season testing at the Circuit de Barcelona-Catalunya in February, Alonso suffered a concussion and, as a result, Kevin Magnussen replaced him for the season-opening Australian Grand Prix in March. At that inaugural race of the season, Jenson Button finished 11th, but was lapped twice and finished last of the finishing cars. Following considerable unreliability and initial suggestions that the Honda engine was underpowered relative to its competitors, steady performance gains eventually resulted in Button managing to score the team's first (four) points of the season at the sixth round in Monaco. By contrast, Alonso scored his first point three races later at the British Grand Prix. The Hungarian Grand Prix saw the team score their best result of the season with Alonso and Button finishing fifth and ninth, respectively. However, McLaren did not score points in the next four races until Button finished ninth at the Russian Grand Prix. At the following United States Grand Prix, Button scored his best result of the season with sixth place. The team finished ninth in the constructors' standings with 27 points, McLaren's worst performance since 1980.

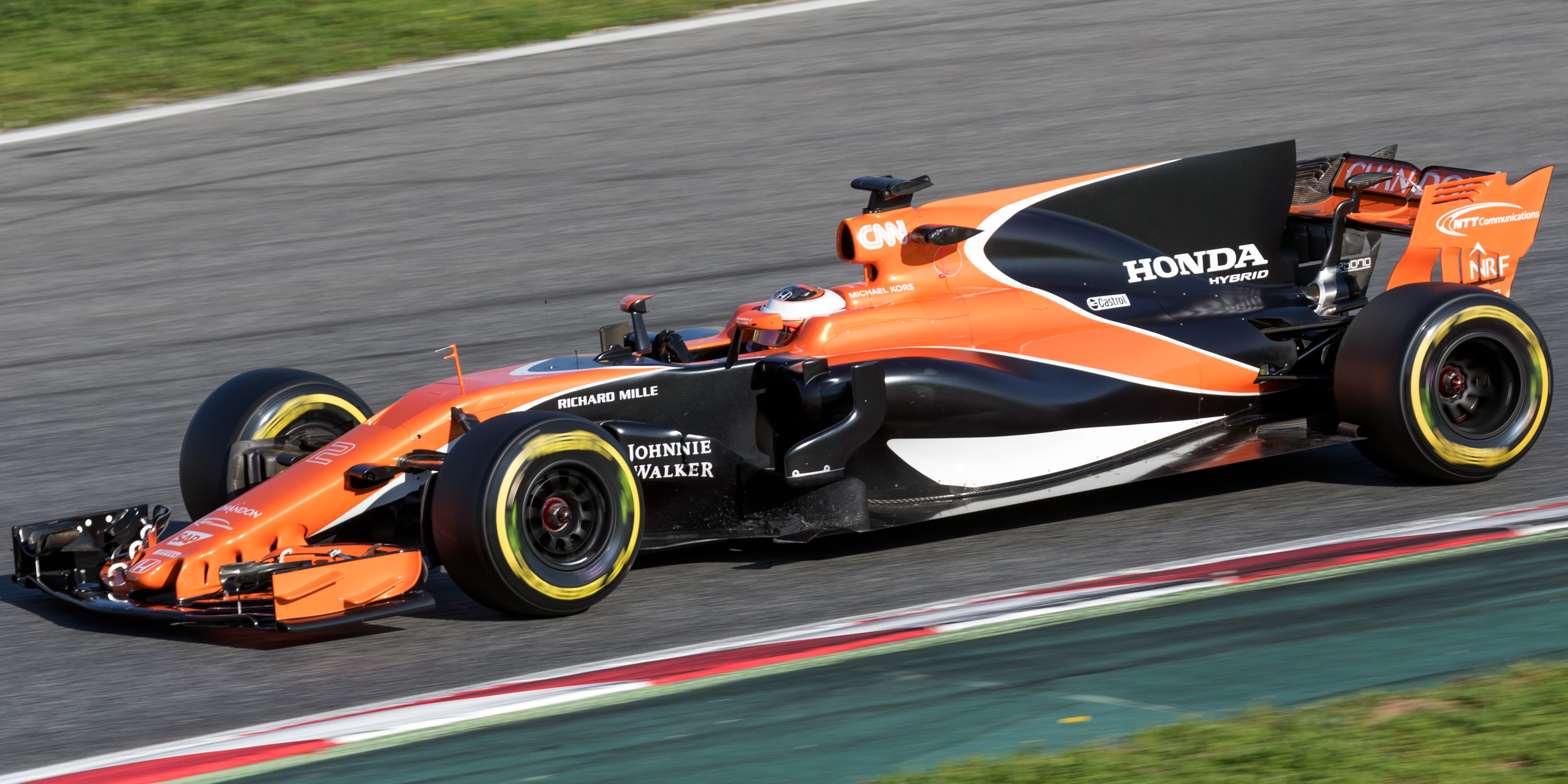
Stoffel Vandoorne in the MCL32, showing the new papaya and black livery

McLaren retained both Alonso and Button for the 2016 season. The second year of the Honda partnership was better than the first, with the team being able to challenge for top 10 positions on a more regular basis. However, the season started with a crash at the Australian Grand Prix in which Fernando Alonso sustained rib fractures and a collapsed lung after colliding with Esteban Gutiérrez and somersaulting into the crash barriers. Alonso, as a result of his injuries, was forced to miss the second round of the Championship, the Bahrain Grand Prix, and was replaced by reserve driver Stoffel Vandoorne. Vandoorne scored the team's first point of the season with 10th place on his debut. The next points for McLaren came at the Russian Grand Prix with Alonso and Button finishing sixth and 10th respectively. The rain-affected Monaco Grand Prix was one of best races of the season for the team. Alonso finished fifth, having kept Nico Rosberg's Mercedes behind him for 46 laps, while Button scored two points with ninth. At the Austrian Grand Prix, Button recorded his best result of the season with a sixth-place after qualifying third in a wet/dry session. After the British Grand Prix at Silverstone, the team scored points at the next three rounds with six points in Hungary, four in Germany, and six points again thanks to a seventh-place finish from Alonso at the Belgian Grand Prix. At the United States Grand Prix, McLaren matched their Monaco result with 12 points after Alonso claimed fifth position while Button once again finished ninth. Alonso and Button finished the championship in 10th and 15th places respectively with the team ending the season in sixth place in the Constructors' Championship with 76 points. On 3 September 2016, Jenson Button announced he would take a sabbatical from Formula One for the 2017 season. He then confirmed on 25 November that he would retire from F1 altogether with Vandoorne being Alonso's new Teammate for 2017.

In February 2017, McLaren signed Lando Norris to the Young Driver Programme. Alonso did not take part in the 2017 Monaco Grand Prix as he was participating in the Indianapolis 500, being replaced by Jenson Button. Button retired from the race on lap 57 after suffering terminal damage, having hit the Sauber of Pascal Wehrlein. McLaren finished 2017 9th with 30 points in total.

=== 2018–2020: Customer Renault engines ===
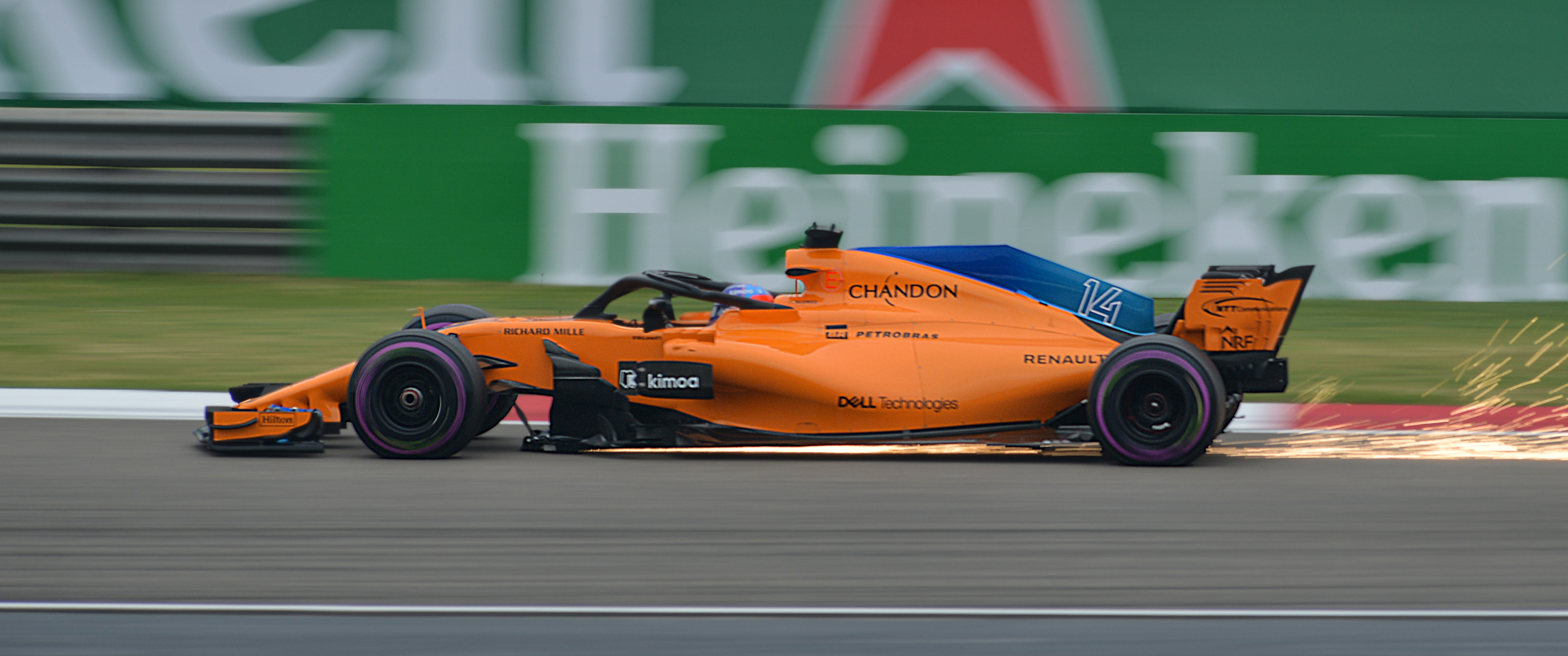
2018 wound up being Fernando Alonso's (pictured driving a McLaren MCL33 at the 2018 Chinese Grand Prix) final season in Formula One, before he returned in 2021.

McLaren announced during the 2017 Singapore Grand Prix weekend that they would split from engine supplier Honda at the end of the 2017 season and had agreed on a three-year customer deal to be supplied with Mecachrome-assembled Renault engines. Team boss Éric Boullier described their performance between 2015 and 2017 as a "proper disaster" for the team's credibility. 2018 was the first season in McLaren's history when their cars were powered by Renault engines. McLaren also announced that Fernando Alonso and Stoffel Vandoorne would remain with the team for the 2018 season. On 6 November 2017, the team announced that Lando Norris would be the team's test and reserve driver.

At the season-opening Australian Grand Prix, Fernando Alonso scored the team's best finish since the 2016 Monaco Grand Prix with fifth, Alonso said that the team's target would be Red Bull Racing. McLaren had a relatively good start to the season with points finishes in the next four races, but in the next 16 races after Spain, McLaren only scored 22 points, 8 points less than in the same period in 2017. On 14 August 2018, Fernando Alonso announced he would not compete in Formula One in 2019, ending his four-year spell at the team. Carlos Sainz Jr. was signed as his replacement on a multi-year deal. On 3 September 2018, it was announced that Stoffel Vandoorne would be leaving the team at the end of the season, with Lando Norris being promoted from reserve driver to replace him in 2019. McLaren struggled with performance throughout the season, with the McLaren drivers being knocked out 21 times in the first qualifying session, and McLaren having the second-worst average qualifying ranking of any team, only ahead of Williams. The team finished the season – after being helped by the exclusion of Force India's points from the first 12 races – in 6th place with 62 points, 357 points behind their target, Red Bull Racing, with the same engine.

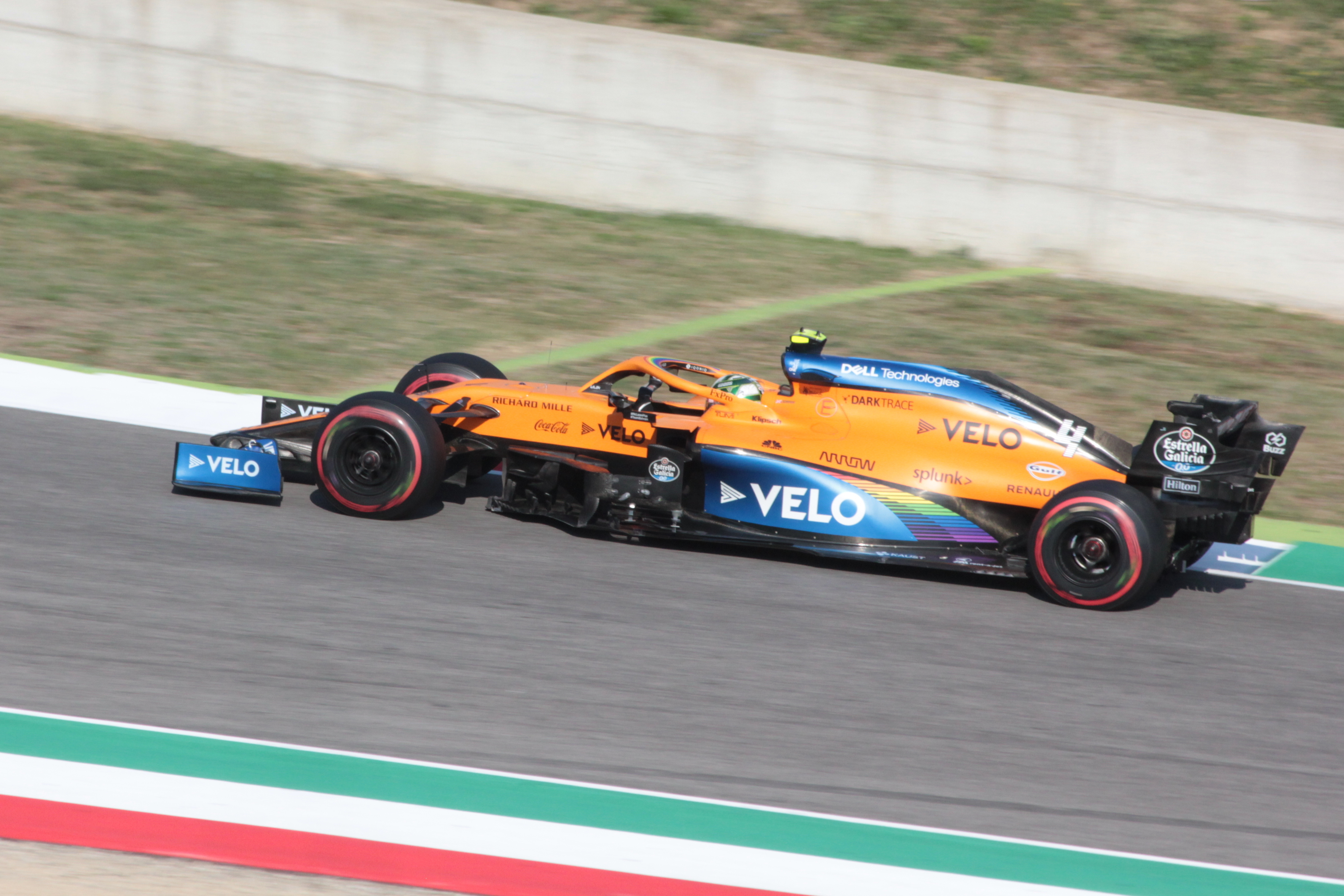
Lando Norris driving the McLaren MCL35 at the 2020 Tuscan Grand Prix. Norris achieved his first career podium at the 2020 Austrian Grand Prix.

In the 2019 season, McLaren established themselves as the fourth-fastest constructor, behind Mercedes, Ferrari, and Red Bull. At the Brazilian Grand Prix, Sainz recorded the team's first podium since the 2014 Australian Grand Prix, finishing fourth on the road but later promoted to third after Lewis Hamilton received a post-race penalty, meaning that the team missed out on the official podium ceremony. McLaren ended the season in 4th place with 145 points, their best result since 2014 and 54 points ahead of their nearest competitor, Renault.

McLaren retained Norris and Sainz for the 2020 season. The season was significantly impacted by the COVID-19 pandemic. The season was shortened to 17 races, with the season opener to take place in Austria. At the Austrian Grand Prix, Norris achieved his first ever podium, finishing in third. Sainz achieved the team's second podium in 2020 at the Italian Grand Prix, where he finished second. The team finished the 2020 season third in the constructors' championship with 202 points. Sainz finished the drivers' championship in sixth with 105 points and Norris in ninth with 97 points.

=== 2021–present: Return to Mercedes engines ===
==== 2021–2023: Continued spells in the midfield ====
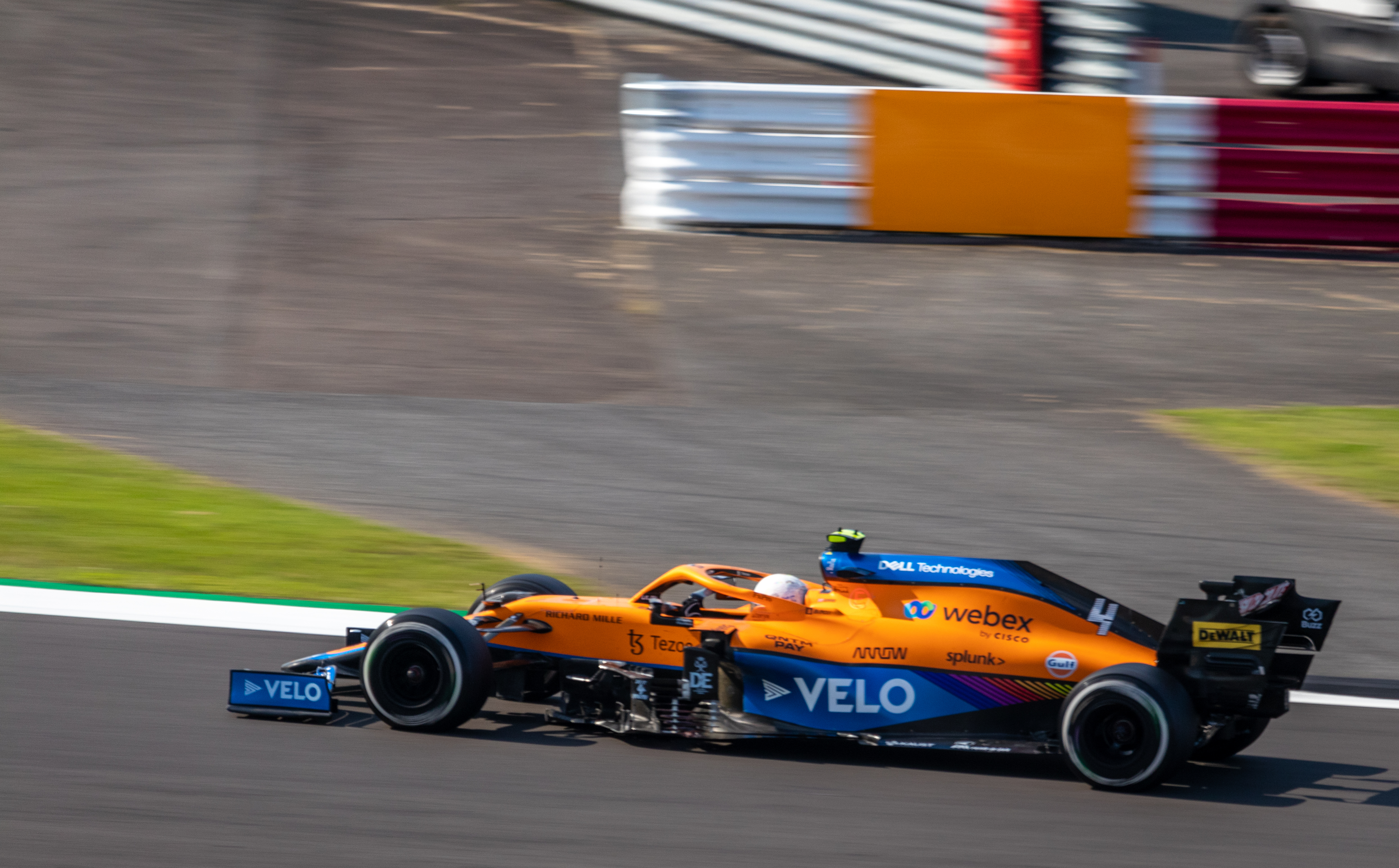
Lando Norris driving the McLaren MCL35M at the 2021 British Grand Prix. The 2021 season marked McLaren's return to Mercedes power since 2014; the team scored the only 1-2 of the season at the 2021 Italian Grand Prix, which was also their first win since the 2012 Brazilian Grand Prix.

McLaren again used Mercedes engines in 2021 after their deal with Renault ended. McLaren had previously collaborated with Mercedes from 1995 through 2014 (1995 to 2009 as a works partner and later 2010 to 2014 as a customer partner) but this time a customer role system by pay-lease agreement. Daniel Ricciardo moved from Renault to partner Lando Norris for the 2021 Formula One World Championship on a multi-year deal. Ricciardo replaced Carlos Sainz, who moved to Ferrari. In the season's first nine races, the team scored three podiums with Mercedes power, in Italy, Monaco and Austria, all courtesy of Norris.

At the 2021 Italian Grand Prix, Ricciardo scored his first win since the 2018 Monaco Grand Prix, and McLaren's first win since the 2012 Brazilian Grand Prix. A second-place finish for Norris also meant that McLaren achieved their first one-two finish since the 2010 Canadian Grand Prix and the only one-two finish for the 2021 season. Norris secured the team's first pole position in the hybrid era at the 2021 Russian Grand Prix but was unable to convert it to a win, finishing in seventh place due to the sudden drastic change in weather conditions and team strategy in the last two laps of the race. A subsequent drop in form in the latter part of the season saw McLaren ending up fourth in the constructors' championship behind Ferrari.

For the 2022 season, McLaren retained both Norris and Ricciardo. Ricciardo tested positive for COVID-19 ahead of the pre-season tests in Bahrain, which meant Norris was required to do all the remaining running for the test although a brake problem limited the testing he was able to conduct. Both drivers struggled at the first race in Bahrain, with neither driver reaching Q3 – the first time since the 2020 Turkish Grand Prix – and finishing 14th and 15th in the race. Norris achieved third at the Emilia Romagna Grand Prix. After Norris missed the first day at the track during the São Paulo Grand Prix weekend, McLaren suffered their first double DNF finish since Monaco 2017 as Norris had an electrical fault and Ricciardo was involved in a collision with Haas' Kevin Magnussen. Ricciardo struggled relative to his teammate, amid reports that McLaren could activate exit clauses in his contract. This forced Ricciardo into releasing a statement on Instagram, confirming he would stay through to 2023. In August 2022, Riccardo's contract for 2023 was terminated by mutual agreement. Oscar Piastri replaced Ricciardo for the 2023 season after a contract dispute with Alpine F1 Team was resolved in McLaren's favour by the FIA Contract Recognition Board. McLaren finished the season in fifth place in the constructors' championship behind Alpine.

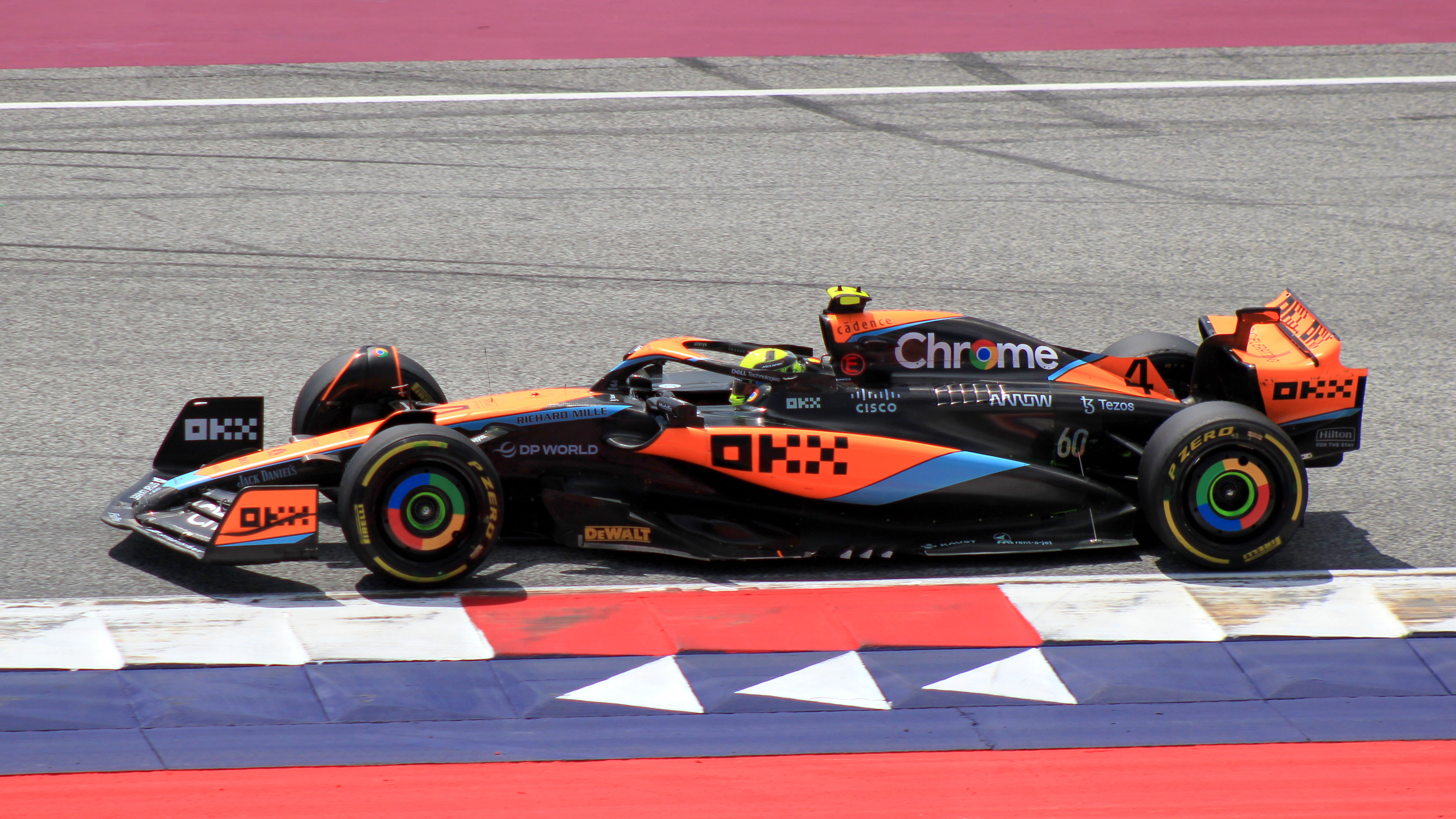
Lando Norris driving the McLaren MCL60 at the 2023 Austrian Grand Prix. After a poor start to the season, the team rethought its design direction, resulting in an uptick in the MCL60's performance by the midpoint of the season.

The 2023 season celebrated the 60th anniversary of the team's founding, with the season's car named the MCL60 in commemoration. The season started with multiple technical issues, causing them to release a public statement after the Saudi Arabian Grand Prix, announcing certain organisational changes. (Note: Of these changes, James Key would be replaced as Technical Director and replaced by a Technical Executive Team consisting of three new specialised Technical Director roles consisting of Peter Prodomou as Technical Director, Aerodynamics, David Sanchez (joining in January 2024 after his gardening leave ended) as Technical Director, Car concept and performance, and Neil Houdly, Technical Director Engineer and Design who is a placeholder for Rob Marshall, who, like Sanchez, has been hired from a rival team but is on gardening leave until January 2024.) After not scoring points in the first two races, Norris and Piastri finished the chaotic Australian Grand Prix in sixth and eighth place respectively, with Piastri scoring his first points in Formula One and for McLaren. During the midpoint of the season, McLaren's trajectory began to increase with upgrades being introduced at the Austrian and Singapore Grands Prix. The upgrades were an immediate success, and McLaren attained its first podium with Norris since the 2021 Italian Grand Prix. Piastri achieved his first career podium at the Japanese Grand Prix and won the Qatar Grand Prix sprint race, marking McLaren's first sprint race victory in Formula One; the main race saw a record be broken for the fastest pit stop in Formula One, setting a pit stop time of 1.80 seconds, 0.02 quicker than the previous record set by Red Bull Racing in the 2019 Brazilian Grand Prix. During the Abu Dhabi Grand Prix weekend, McLaren signed an extension to use Mercedes engines until 2030. McLaren took fourth place in the Constructors' Championship, with Norris taking sixth and Piastri taking ninth in the drivers' championship.

==== 2024–2025: World Championship years ====
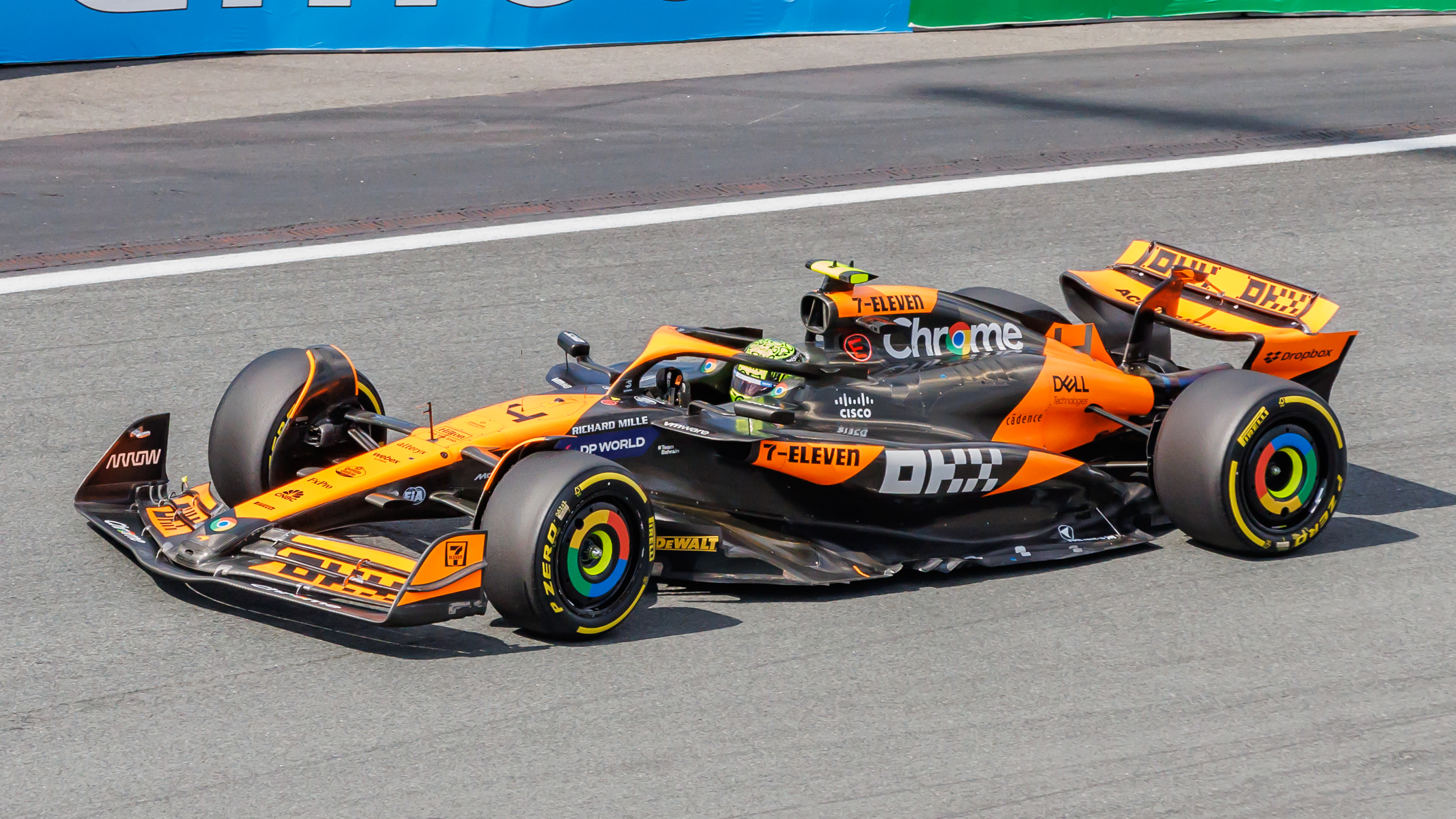
An evolution of the accomplished MCL60, the MCL38 scored consistent results after a mid-season upgrade, propelling them into championship contention and subsequent Constructors' Championship victory.

The success of the MCL60 provided McLaren, who finished the 2023 season in fourth, allowing for more testing time, numerous opportunities to capitalise in performance for the 2024 season. Retaining Norris and Piastri, the team hired David Sanchez from Scuderia Ferrari to lead development alongside Peter Prodromou and Neil Houldey (after a restructuring, Rob Marshall would lead development) for the 2024 car, titled the MCL38. At the start of the season, the MCL38 proved to be the third-fastest car overall behind Ferrari's SF-24. The SF-24 had superior tyre management, but the MCL38 excelled in qualifying. McLaren revealed a substantial upgrade package that would be utilised for the Miami Grand Prix. The upgrade's success would be confirmed after Norris took the lead from Verstappen and went on to win the race, marking his maiden Formula One career victory. McLaren expected the upgrades to improve the car's performance across all conditions; the upgrade was much more successful than expected, to the point the team needed to investigate it. By the British Grand Prix, the MCL38 had been established as the fastest car. One of these successes included a 1-2 finish at the Hungarian Grand Prix, McLaren's first since the 2021 Italian Grand Prix. A mid-season upgrade introduced for the Dutch Grand Prix further improved performance, with Norris winning by over 27 seconds ahead of second-placed Verstappen. Piastri's triumph at the Azerbaijan Grand Prix moved McLaren up to first in the World Constructors' Championship. This was the first time since 2014 that McLaren had led the WCC. In Abu Dhabi, Norris finished in first to win McLaren's first World Constructors' Championship since 1998.

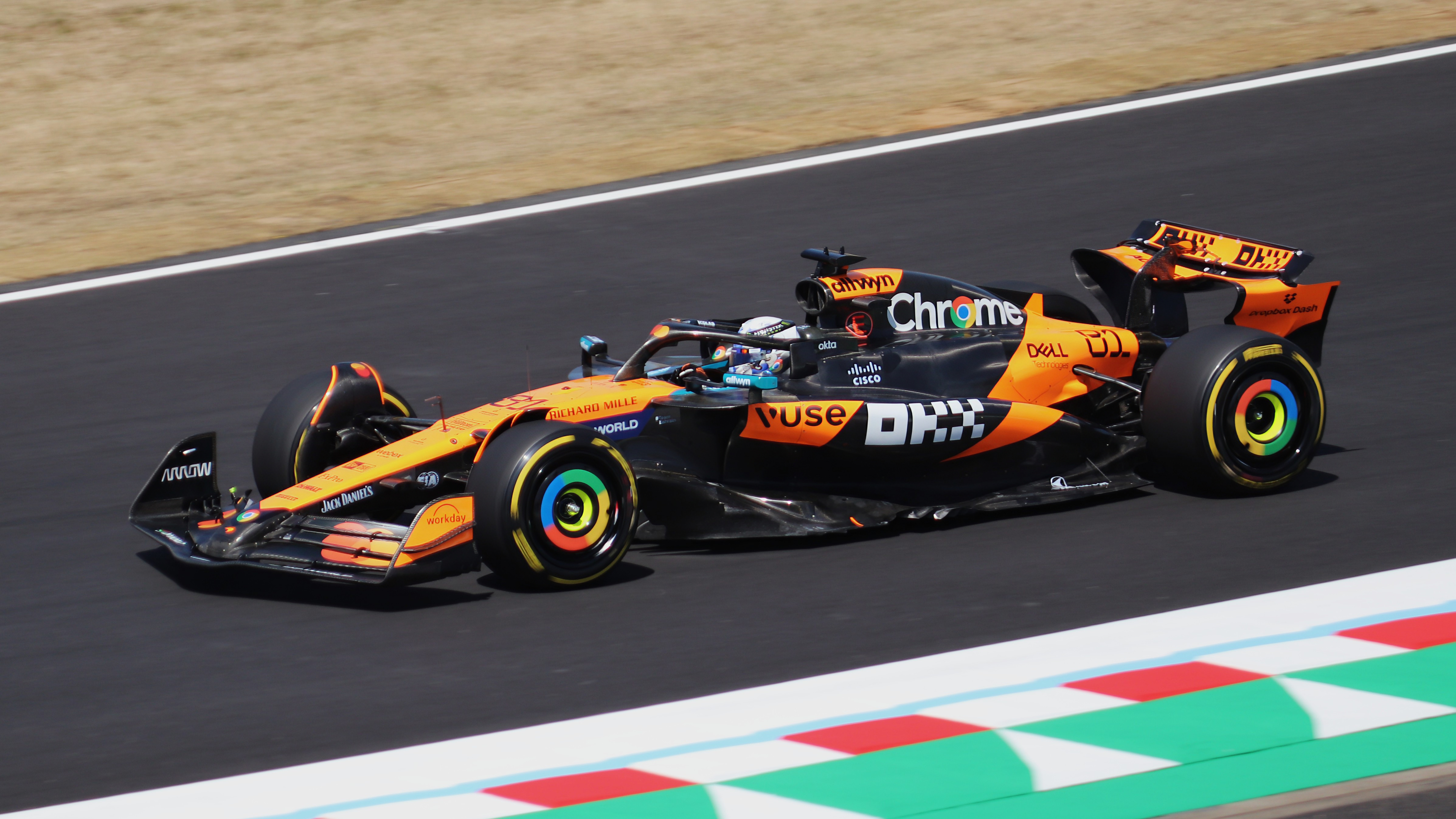
An improvement on the successful MCL38, the MCL39, took consistent podiums and won fourteen of the twenty-four races in which it competed, giving the team enough momentum to secure their tenth Constructors' Championship, and their first Drivers' Championship since 2008.

With McLaren winning the WCC the previous season, they were allocated less testing time in 2025, and were deemed the favourites to defend the Constructors' Championship. The MCL39 was the first McLaren car to be fully overseen by Rob Marshall, and it exhibited numerous technical improvements over its predecessor. The MCL39 showed an immediate advantage over the rest of the field; McLaren won fourteen out of twenty-four races in 2025 season, with Norris and Piastri both scoring seven wins each - including seven 1-2 finishes - and scored podiums in all possible races, bar three: the Canadian, Azerbaijan, and Las Vegas Grands Prix. Despite an uptick in pace from Red Bull, McLaren was able to secure their tenth championship at the Singapore Grand Prix, becoming the most-successful Formula One independent constructor of all time to date. Amidst the team's dominance in winning the Constructors' Championship, a battle for the Drivers' Championship between Norris and Piastri began: Norris led the early stages of the championship before Piastri took the lead after capitalising on Norris' mistake in qualifying for the Saudi Arabian Grand Prix. As the season drew to a close, Piastri experienced a downturn in form, which also coincided with two crashes at the Azerbaijan and São Paulo Grands Prix. Norris and Red Bull's Max Verstappen took advantage of this, with the former in particular recovering from a gap as high as 34 points after the Dutch Grand Prix to eventually retake the lead of the Drivers' Championship by one point by winning the Mexico City Grand Prix. Norris and Piastri were both disqualified from the Las Vegas Grand Prix due to a plank wear infringement, marking the first time both McLaren drivers were disqualified in one Grand Prix. The result allowed Verstappen to be level on points with Piastri. Finishing in fourth with both Verstappen and Piastri on the podium, Norris was unable to secure the Drivers' Championship at the Qatar Grand Prix, bringing the championship fight to the final race of the season, the Abu Dhabi Grand Prix. Piastri and Norris finished the Abu Dhabi Grand Prix in second and third, respectively. The third place finish allowed Norris to win his first Drivers' Championship and McLaren's first Drivers' Championship since 2008. This also marked McLaren's first double championship winning season since 1998.

==== 2026: New regulations and World Championship defence ====
Major changes to the regulations were observed for 2026, which marked Norris' first season as defending Drivers' Champion, with Piastri continuing to race alongside him. McLaren also entered the season as defending Constructors' Champions, with their MCL40 debuting at a pre-season shakedown at Circuit de Barcelona-Catalunya. McLaren experienced numerous struggles over the first part of the season. Their car, while a contender for the top five positions, was indeed off the pace of Mercedes and Ferrari. At the Australian Grand Prix, Norris finished fifth and Piastri crashed his MCL40 heavily before the race began. McLaren failed to start the Chinese Grand Prix, their 1000th entry, (Note: Thus becoming the second constructor after Ferrari to record entrances at 1000 Grands Prix) after facing power unit issues; marking the first time this has happened since the controversial 2005 United States Grand Prix. McLaren returned to the podium at the Japanese Grand Prix, by then becoming the second-best car behind the Mercedes W17. A pointless weekend ensued at the Canadian Grand Prix with Norris retiring, again due to power unit issues, and Piastri finishing outside the points. As 2026 marked the 60th anniversary of the running of the 1966 Monaco Grand Prix, where the team made its debut, the team opted to celebrate their 1000th entry at the following race, the 2026 Monaco Grand Prix. At the Spanish Grand Prix, Norris secured his third pole position of the season. During the race, Norris led comfortably ahead of Kimi Antonelli and Max Verstappen until Lance Stroll stopped on lap 13. The virtual safety car was called on lap 14 just seconds after Norris had passed the pit entry. Norris pitted on the following lap after the virtual safety car ended and came out in fifth, eventually finishing the race in third behind Antonelli and Verstappen.

== Racing history: Other series ==
Outside of the Formula One World Championship, McLaren's greatest initial success was in Can-Am, which they dominated from 1967 to 1971. Further American triumph followed, with Indianapolis 500 wins in McLaren cars for Mark Donohue in 1972 and Johnny Rutherford in 1974 and 1976. After initially returning to the Indianapolis 500 in 2017 as a backer of Andretti Autosport to run Fernando Alonso and then in 2019 as an independent entry, McLaren announced in August 2019 that they would run in conjunction with Arrow Schmidt Peterson Motorsports starting in 2020 to run the full IndyCar Series, the combined entry being named Arrow McLaren SP. Initially having no ownership interest in the team, McLaren would purchase 75% of the operation in 2021.

Track-modified McLaren road cars have seen success in sports car and endurance racing, with a modified version of the McLaren F1 road car taking victory at the 1995 24 Hours of Le Mans; the team is set to rejoin the top class of the FIA World Endurance Championship in 2027, with McLaren Racing CEO Zak Brown's team United Autosports partnering to race a hypercar to fit with the WEC's LMDh formula regulations. McLaren entered the electric off-road racing series Extreme E from 2022 to 2024, and also entered Formula E from the 2022–23 season to the 2024–25 season.

=== Can-Am ===
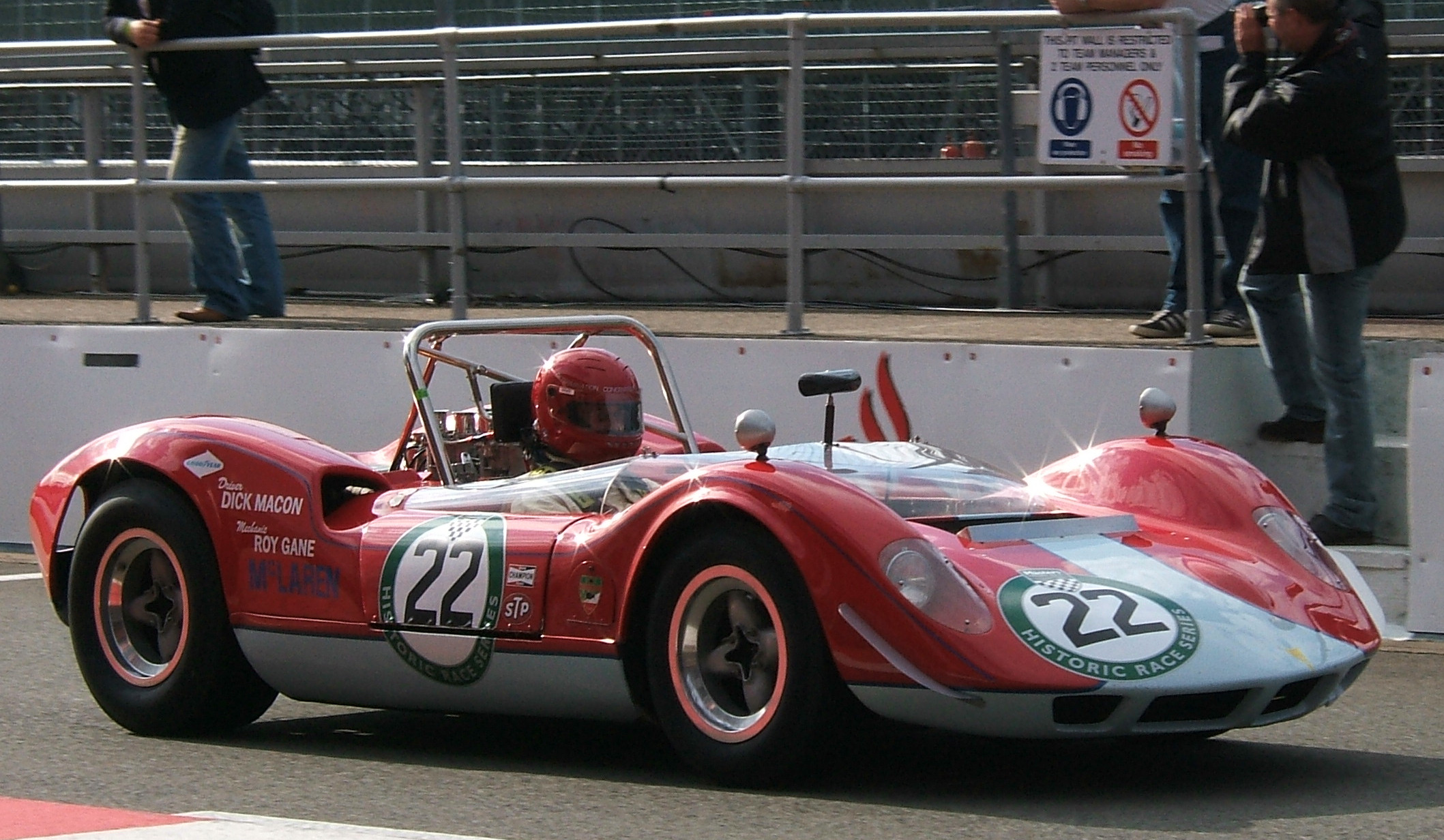
The McLaren M1A sports car of 1964 was the team's first self-designed car. The 'B' version raced in Can-Am in the 1966 season.

McLaren's first racing car designed and built "from the rubber up" by Bruce McLaren Motor Racing was the M1. Bruce McLaren won races with the small-block Oldsmobile-powered car. The car was raced in North America and Europe in 1964 in various A sports and United States Road Racing Championship events. In 1965 the team car was the M1A prototype from which the production Elva M1As were based. In late 1965, the M1B (also known as Mk2) was the team car for the North American races at the end of the year. For the Can-Am Series, which started in 1966, McLaren created the M3 which Bruce and Chris Amon drove – customer cars also appeared in several races in the 1966 season. With the M3, they led two races but scored no wins, and the inaugural title was taken by John Surtees in a Lola T70. The following year, Robin Herd purpose-designed the Chevrolet V8-powered M6A, delays with the Formula One programme allowing the team to spend extra resources on developing the Can-Am car which was the first to be painted in McLaren orange. With Denny Hulme now partnering Bruce, they won five of six races and Bruce won the championship, setting the pattern for the next four years. In the 1968 season, they used a new car, the M8, to win four races; non-works McLarens took the other two, but this time Hulme was victorious overall. In the 1969 season, McLaren domination became total as they won all 11 races with the M8B; Hulme won five, and Bruce won six and the Drivers' Championship. From 1969 onwards, McLaren M12 – the customer "variant" of the M8 – was driven by several entrants, including a version modified by Jim Hall of Chaparral fame. McLaren's success in Can-Am brought with it financial rewards, both prize money and money from selling cars to other teams, that helped to support the team and fund the nascent and relatively poor-paying Formula One programme.

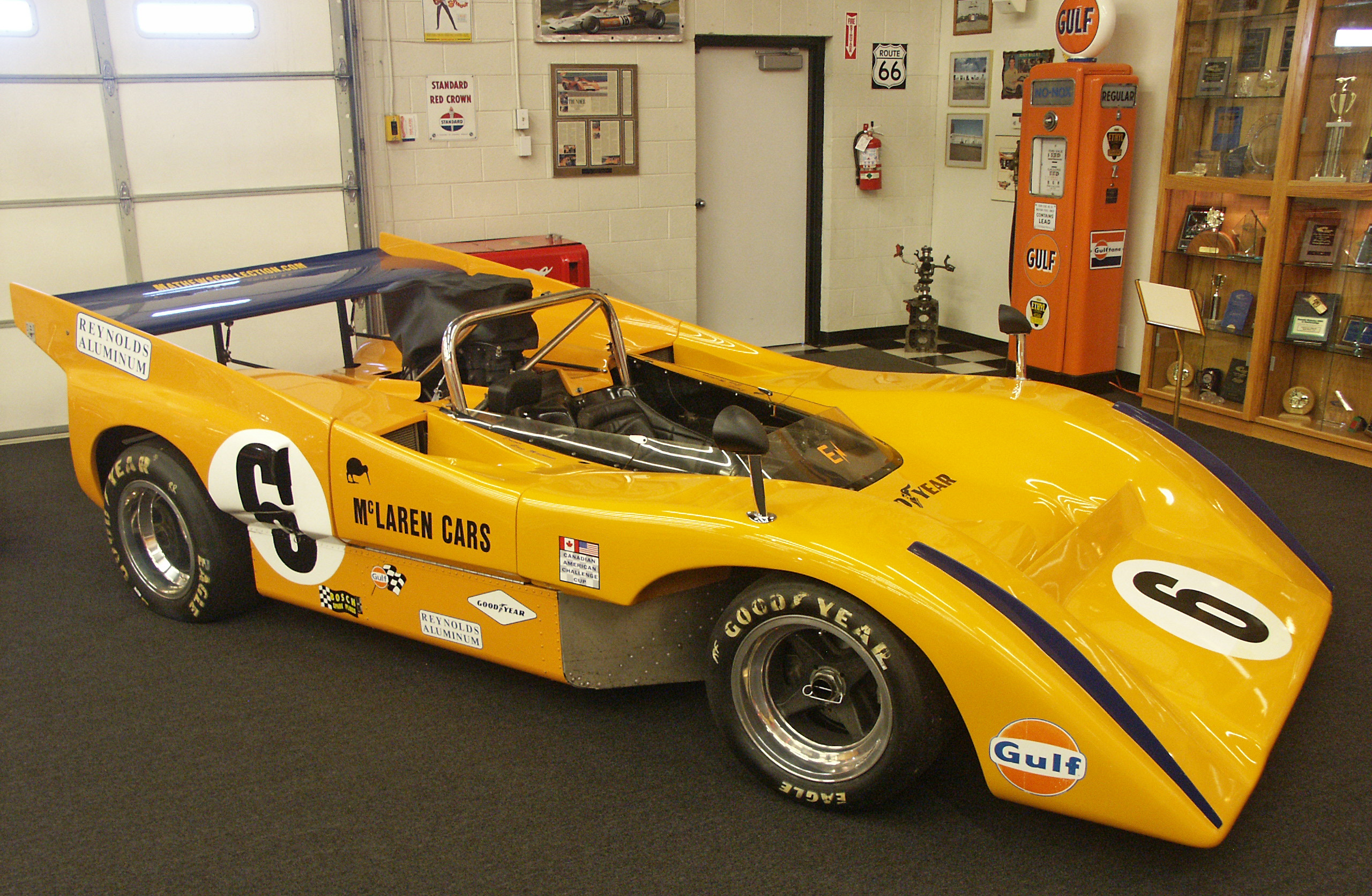
Bruce McLaren was killed testing a McLaren M8D at Goodwood in 1970.

When Bruce was killed testing the 1970 season's M8D, he was at first replaced by Dan Gurney, then later by Peter Gethin. They won two and one races, respectively, while Hulme won six on the way to the championship. Private teams competing in the 1970 Can-Am series included older M3Bs as well as the M12 – the customer version of the team's M8B. In the 1971 season, the team held off the challenge of 1969 world champion Jackie Stewart in the Lola T260, winning eight races, with Peter Revson taking the title. Hulme also won three Can-Am races in the 1972 season, but the McLaren M20 was defeated by the Porsche 917/10s of Mark Donohue and George Follmer. Faced by the greater resources of Porsche, McLaren decided to abandon Can-Am at the end of 1972 and focus solely on open-wheel racing. When the original Can-Am series ceased at the end of the 1974 season, McLaren was by far the most successful constructor with 43 wins.

=== American open-wheel racing ===
==== USAC (1970–1979) ====
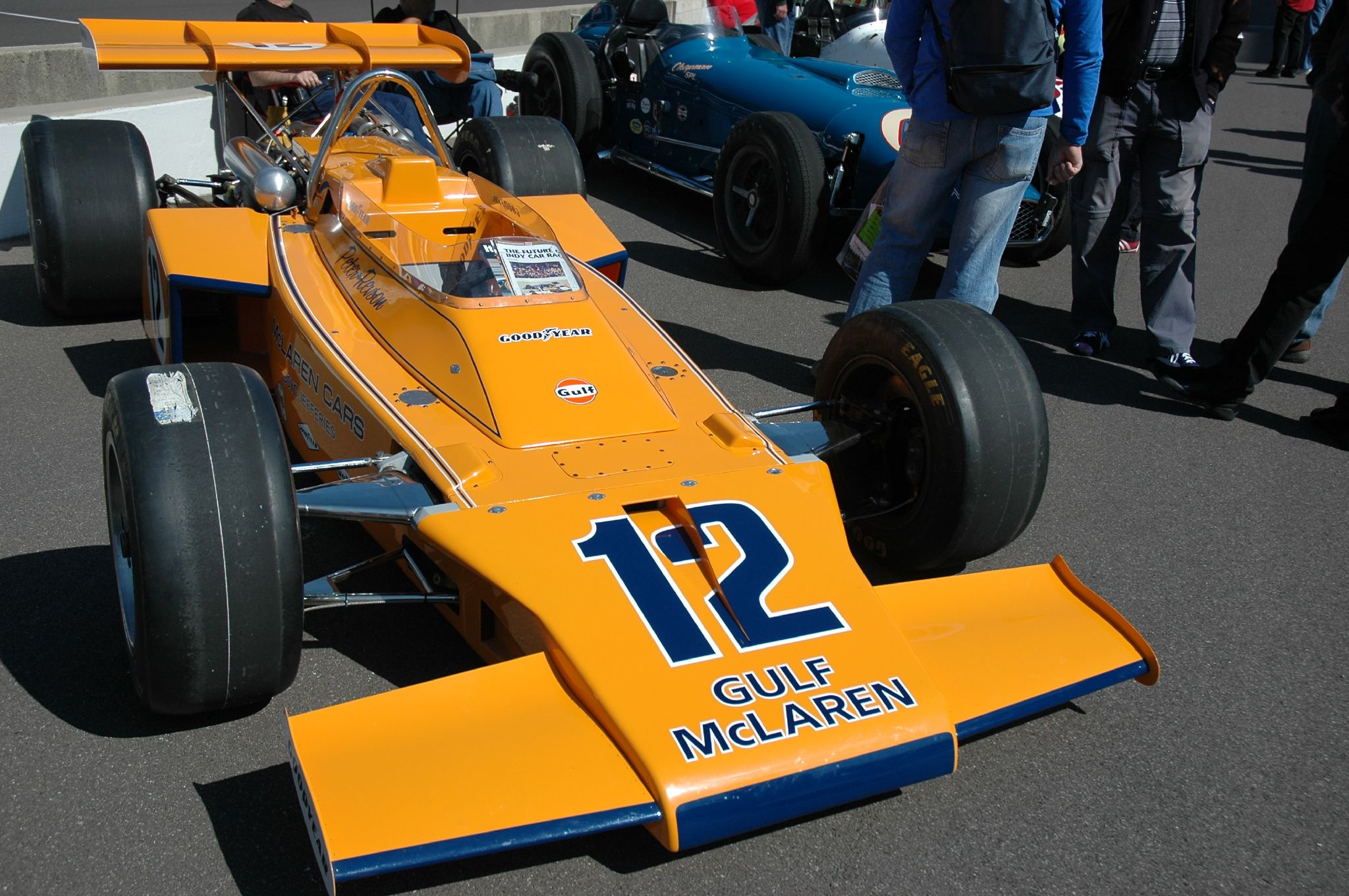
The McLaren M16C was driven by Peter Revson in the 1972 Indianapolis 500.

McLaren first contested the United States Auto Club's (USAC) Indianapolis 500 race in 1970, encouraged by their tyre supplier Goodyear, which wanted to break competitor Firestone's stranglehold on the event. With the M15 car, Bruce, Chris Amon, and Denny Hulme entered, but after Amon withdrew and Hulme was severely burned on the hands in an incident in practice, Peter Revson and Carl Williams took their places in the race to retire and finish seventh, respectively. The team also contested some of the more prestigious races in the USAC championship that year, as they would do in subsequent years. For 1971 they had a new car, the M16, which driver Mark Donohue said: "...obsoleted every other car on track..." At that year's Indianapolis 500, Revson qualified on pole and finished second, whilst in 1972, Donohue won in privateer Team Penske's M16B. The 1973 event had Johnny Rutherford join the team; he qualified on pole, but finished ninth, Revson crashed out. McLaren won their first Indianapolis 500 in 1974 with Rutherford. The McLaren and Rutherford combination was second in 1975 and won again in 1976. Developments of the M16 had been used throughout this period until the new M24 car was introduced in 1977. The team did not reproduce their recent success at Indianapolis in 1977, 1978, or 1979, and although they continued to win other USAC races, by the end of 1979, they decided to end their involvement to concentrate on their Formula One programme.

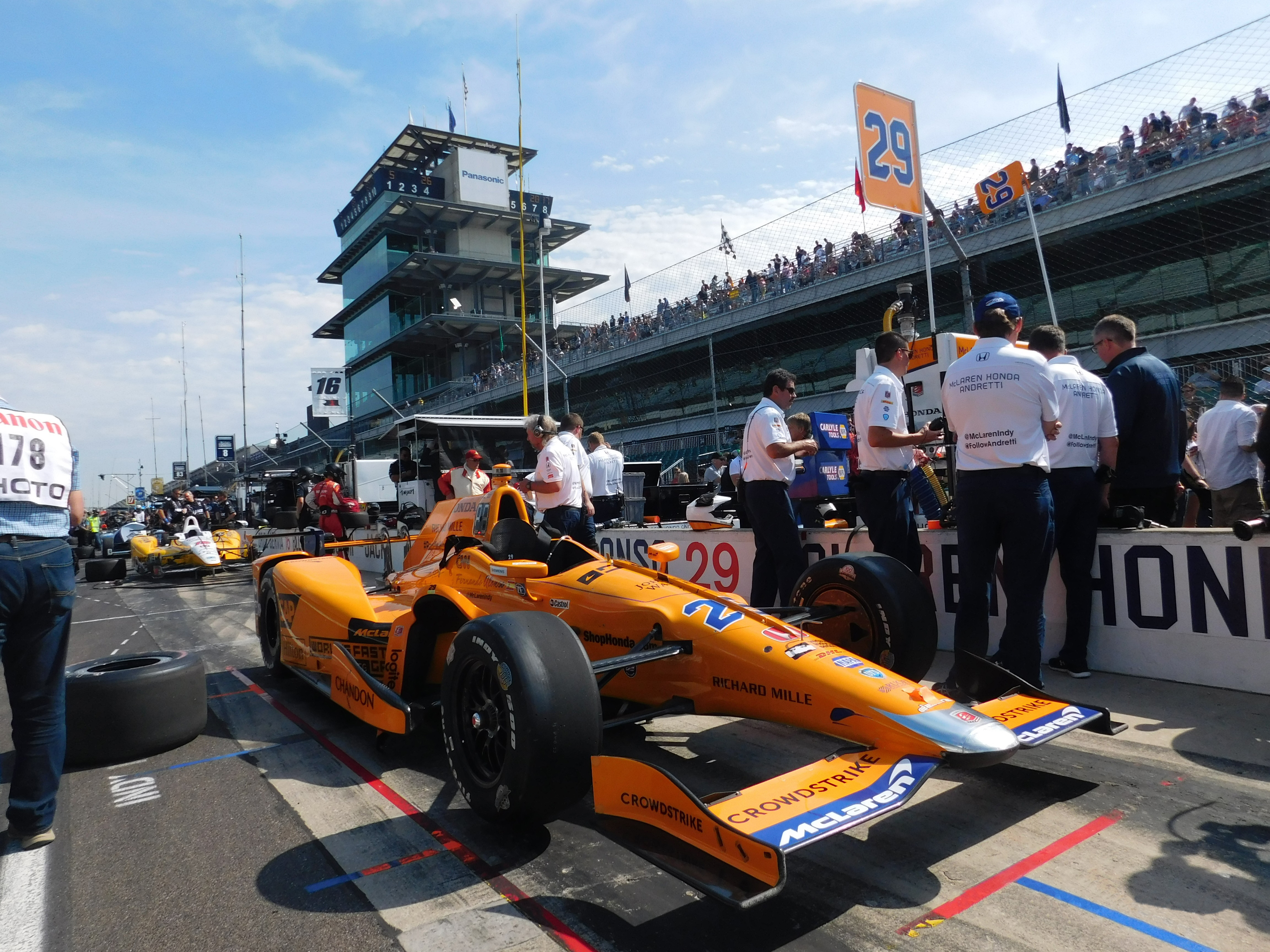
The car backed by McLaren at the 2017 Indianapolis 500, which was driven by Fernando Alonso

==== IndyCar Series ====
===== 2017 and 2019 Indianapolis 500 =====
On 12 April 2017, McLaren revealed they would participate in the 2017 Indianapolis 500 with their current Formula 1 driver Fernando Alonso at the wheel of a Honda-powered McLaren-branded Andretti Autosport IndyCar. In qualifying, Alonso secured a second-row start from fifth. During the race Alonso led 27 laps in his first Indy 500 start. With 21 laps remaining Alonso was running seventh when his Honda engine failed. He was classified 24th. After his retirement he received a standing ovation from the grandstands. Alonso was praised for his strong debut.

On 10 November 2018, McLaren announced that they would participate in the 2019 Indianapolis 500 with Fernando Alonso and using Chevrolet engines. However, after mechanical difficulties and a severe crash in practice, the team failed to qualify for the race.

===== Full season (2020–present) =====
Arrow McLaren IndyCar Team
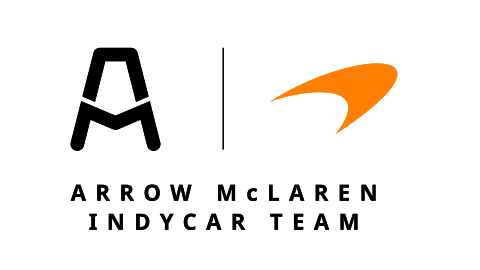
- Owner(s): McLaren Racing Limited
- Principal(s): Zak Brown (Chairman); Brian Barnhart (General Manager); Tony Kanaan (Team Principal)
- Base: Indianapolis, Indiana, United States
- Series: IndyCar Series
- Race drivers: 5. (Mexico) Pato O'Ward; 6. (United States) Nolan Siegel; 7. (Denmark) Christian Lundgaard
- Manufacturer: Chevrolet

Career
- Debut: 2020 Genesys 300
- Latest race: 2026 Mission Grand Prix of Monterey (Laguna Seca)
- Race victories: 12
- Pole positions: 11

In August 2019, it was announced McLaren would contest the championship full-time in 2020, collaborating with Arrow Schmidt Peterson Motorsports to form Arrow McLaren SP.

Zak Brown stated in an interview with Leigh Diffey that McLaren joining the IndyCar Series full time was spurred by two different objectives. The first was to market the McLaren brand and some of the McLaren Formula One team's prominent American based sponsors in a primarily North America centric racing series, as Formula One only had three races in North America in 2021 and only one of those races was in the United States. The second was to branch McLaren's engineering expertise into a racing series that the other Formula One teams were not involved in, as Brown thought McLaren would stand out more amongst its competitors in IndyCar than it would in other racing series. Brown also stated that McLaren chose to partner with Schmidt Peterson Motorsports because their previous efforts fielding their team with assistance from Andretti Autosport and Carlin exclusively for the Indianapolis 500 had not been successful and that the purchase of the IndyCar Series by Penske Entertainment gave McLaren more confidence in the long term viability and stability of the series compared to the previous ownership under Tony George.

In August 2021, it was announced that McLaren Racing will acquire a majority stake in the IndyCar Team. The transaction closed by the end of the year and saw McLaren Racing take a 75% share of the team. Financial terms of the deal were not disclosed.

For the 2022 IndyCar Series, the team's first under McLaren ownership, both O'Ward and Rosenqvist would return to the team as full time entries. The No. 6 car would again return on a part-time basis for the GMR Grand Prix and the 2022 Indianapolis 500 driven by Juan Pablo Montoya. O'Ward and Rosenqvist would finish second and fourth in the Indianapolis 500 respectively, the team's best finish at Indianapolis to date. The team announced they had signed Alexander Rossi to drive a third full time car from 2023 and beyond.

For 2023, the team announced they had signed Alexander Rossi to drive a third full time car. Team president Taylor Kiel also left; his duties were redistributed between Brian Barnhart, who joins the team with Rossi from Andretti Autosport as General Manager, and Gavin Ward. In conjunction with McLaren's 60th-anniversary celebration, the team raced a special livery for the 2023 Indianapolis 500 to celebrate McLaren's Triple Crown achievement. The liveries of the Nos. 7, 6 and 5 were painted as the McLaren M16C/D that won the 1974 Indianapolis 500, the McLaren MP4/2 that won the 1984 Monaco Grand Prix, and the McLaren F1 GTR that won the 1995 24 Hours of Le Mans respectively to honour the three winning McLaren cars that forms the Triple Crown.

For 2024, Rosenqvist moved to Meyer Shank Racing and was replaced by David Malukas, who moved from Dale Coyne Racing. However, after injuring his left wrist early in the year and missing out on the start of the season, Malukas was released from the team replaced by Théo Pourchaire.

=== Electric racing ===
Neom was McLaren's title partner into their endeavour to electric motorsport as NEOM McLaren Electric Racing.

==== Extreme E (2022–2024) ====
In June 2021, McLaren announced it would enter Extreme E in the 2022 season using existing personnel from outside the Formula One programme with Tanner Foust and Emma Gilmour (who becomes the first woman factory driver for McLaren) as drivers for the team. Entering as McLaren XE, the team was rebranded for their second race as NEOM McLaren Extreme E Team for sponsorship reasons. The team won its first podium by finishing second in the Energy X-Prix. In the process, Gilmour became the first woman podium winner for McLaren. The team finished in fifth place in the Team's Championship standings.

McLaren retained Foust and Gilmour for the 2023 season. The team won its second podium by finishing second in Round 4 at the Hydro X-Prix. In Round 7 at the Island X-Prix II, Gilmour suffered a fractured rib and a concussion following a crash during the first free practice session and was ruled out for the rest of the weekend. She was replaced by Extreme E's championship reserve driver Tamara Molinaro for Rounds 7 and 8. McLaren withdrew from Round 8 due to the spare car being too heavily damaged in Round 7's redemption race after Molinaro collided with JBXE's Hedda Hosås on the run down to the first jump at the start of the race and rolled the car. This is the first instance of a team withdrawing from a race in Extreme E. For the final two rounds of the season, McLaren announced that Gilmour was still recovering from her injuries and was replaced by Hosås. McLaren finished in eighth place in the Team's Championship standings. At the end of the season, McLaren announced that Foust and Gilmour will leave the team.

For the 2024 season, McLaren announced a new driver pairing of Cristina Gutiérrez and Mattias Ekström, who moved from X44 and Sainz XE Team respectively. The team won its first podium of the season by finishing second in Round 1 at the Desert X-Prix. On 6 September, a week before the scheduled Island X-Prix, Extreme E announced that the rounds in Sardinia and Phoenix were cancelled as the series transition to Extreme H for 2025.

==== Formula E (2023–2025) ====
(United Kingdom) NEOM McLaren Formula E Team
- Base: McLaren Technology Centre; Woking, Surrey, England; Bicester Motion; Bicester, Oxfordshire, England
- Former series: Formula E
- Noted drivers: (Germany) René Rast (United Kingdom) Jake Hughes (United Kingdom) Sam Bird (United Kingdom) Taylor Barnard
- Races: 43
- Wins: 1
- Podiums: 8
- Poles: 4
- Points: 216
- First entry: 2023 Mexico City ePrix
- Last entry: 2025 London ePrix
- First win: 2024 São Paulo ePrix (March)
- Last win: 2024 São Paulo ePrix (March)
- Website: www.mclaren.com/racing/formula-e/

In December 2020, Zak Brown announced McLaren's interest in entering Formula E once the company's battery supplier contract has expired. In January the following year, McLaren signed an option to enter the championship for 2022.

In May 2022, McLaren announced the acquisition of the Mercedes-EQ Formula E Team and debuted in the 2022–23 season as NEOM McLaren Formula E Team using Nissan's EV powertrain. René Rast, who last raced in the 2020–21 season with Audi Sport ABT Schaeffler, and Jake Hughes were signed as drivers for the team. McLaren made its ePrix debut at the 2023 Mexico City ePrix. Hughes qualified in third and finished the race in fifth place whereas Rast qualified in fifteenth but retired from the race on lap 40 after colliding with Mahindra's Oliver Rowland. McLaren achieved several milestones at the Diriyah ePrix. In the first round, Hughes qualified at second place (missing out on pole position by 0.060s) but finished in eighth whereas Rast qualified and finished in fifth place while scoring McLaren's first fastest lap in Formula E. In the second round, Hughes secured McLaren's maiden pole position in Formula E and Rast qualified in third place. Hughes finished the race in fifth and Rast finished in third place, giving McLaren their maiden podium finish in Formula E. Hughes qualified in second at the Monaco ePrix but was later promoted to pole position after Nissan's Sacha Fenestraz was stripped of his pole position for exceeding his power limit in his final run. Hughes finished the race in fifth place whereas Rast finished in seventeenth after suffering from multiple collisions. McLaren finished the season in eighth in the Teams' Championship.

In August 2023, McLaren announced that Hughes had re-signed with the team whereas Rast will leave the team and was replaced by Sam Bird for the 2023–24 season. Bird won McLaren's maiden electric race victory at the São Paulo ePrix. At the Monaco ePrix, Bird suffered a hand injury during the first free practice session and was replaced by reserve and development driver Taylor Barnard. Barnard qualified in 22nd and finished his debut race in 14th while becoming the youngest driver and the first teenager to start an ePrix at 19 years and 331 days. Barnard continued to deputise for Bird at the Berlin ePrix, where he finished Race 1 in tenth to become youngest point scorer. Hughes left McLaren to join Maserati MSG Racing in mid-2024 and was replaced by Barnard, who was promoted to compete full-time in the 2024–25 season.

At the season opening São Paulo ePrix, Barnard won his maiden podium by finishing in third while also becoming the youngest podium finisher at the age of 20 years and 189 days whereas Bird finished in fourth. Barnard followed up with another podium finish by coming in third at Race 1 of the Jeddah ePrix. At Race 2, he scored his first pole position, becoming the youngest polesitter at the age of 20 years 259 days but failed to convert it to a win, finishing the race in second. In April 2025, McLaren announced that they will exit Formula E at the end of the 2024–25 season to focus on development for the World Endurance Championship. It was later reported that the team will be closed down after McLaren failed to find a buyer and the team entry will be returned to Formula E. McLaren finished their final Formula E race at Race 2 of the London ePrix with a double DNF. McLaren ended the season in sixth in the Teams' Championship whereas Barnard ended his debut season in fourth in the Drivers' Championship, the highest for a McLaren driver.

In 2026, McLaren was fined €400,000 by the FIA for a “minor overspending” breach of the cost cap regulations.

=== Endurance racing ===
(United Kingdom) McLaren Hypercar Team
- Founded: 2027
- Base: McLaren Technology Centre; Woking, Surrey, England
- Team principal(s): James Barclay
- Noted drivers: (Italy) Leonardo Fornaroli (Denmark) Malthe Jakobsen (Denmark) Mikkel Jensen (United Kingdom) Alex Lynn (France) Grégoire Saucy (Belgium) Laurens Vanthoor
- Website: mclaren.com/racing/endurance

In 2021, McLaren reviewed the LMH/LMDh and GTP regulations for a possible entry into the FIA World Endurance Championship (WEC) Hypercar and IMSA WeatherTech SportsCar Championship GTP classes respectively in the future. On 19 June 2024, CEO Zak Brown announced that McLaren is planning a Hypercar class entry with the LMDh regulations by the 2027 season. On 10 April 2025, McLaren announced that they would enter WEC in the Hypercar class utilising the LMDh formula regulations starting from the 2027 season onwards. McLaren will collaborate with Brown's United Autosports and enter the season as McLaren United AS with James Barclay as team principal. McLaren United will also partner with Dallara as the chassis partner. On 24 April 2026, the new car was named as the MCL-HY.

=== Customer racing ===
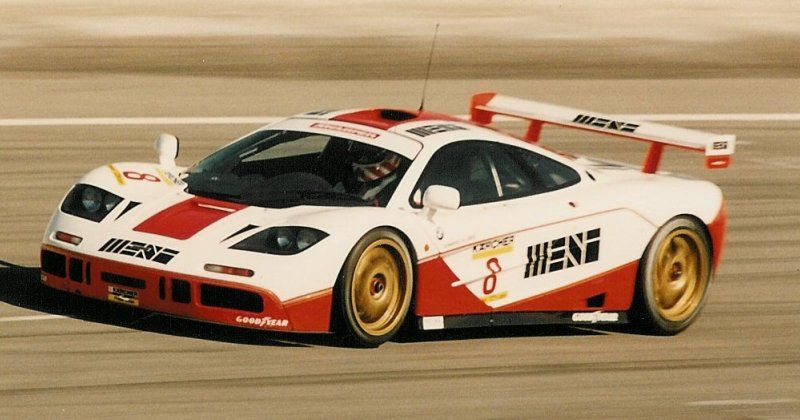
The McLaren F1 GTR, competing during the 1995 BPR Global GT Series season

Besides the cars raced by the works team, a variety of McLaren racing cars have also been used by customer teams. In their formative years, McLaren built Formula Two, hillclimbing, Formula 5000 and sports racing cars that were sold to customers. Lacking the capacity to build the desired numbers, Trojan was subcontracted to construct some of them. In Can-Am, Trojan built customer versions of the M6 and M8 cars and ex-works cars were sold to privateers when new models arrived; half of the field was McLarens at some races. Author Mark Hughes says, "over 220" McLarens were built by Trojan. In USAC competition and Formula One, too, many teams used McLarens during the late 1960s and 1970s. A 1972 M8F was rebuilt as the C8 for use in Group C racing in 1982, but had little success.

In the mid-1990s, McLaren Racing's sister company, McLaren Cars (now McLaren Automotive) built a racing version of their F1 road car, the F1 GTR which won the 1995 24 Hours of Le Mans and the 1995 and 1996 BPR Global GT Series. In 2011, a GT3 version of the MP4-12C road car was developed in partnership with CRS Racing, making its competitive debut at the VLN and ADAC GT Masters in 2012. The MP4-12C was succeeded by the McLaren 650S and then the McLaren 720S for GT3 racing, while a GT4 version of the McLaren 570S was also developed as well.

In 2022, McLaren Automotive announced a new GT4 model based on the McLaren Artura, along with an unrestricted version named the Artura Trophy, which is to be used in McLaren's planned one-make series.

In October 2023, McLaren Automotive announced its intent to participate in the 2024 24 Hours of Le Mans under the new LMGT3 category through CEO Zak Brown's United Autosports as its customer team. McLaren Automotive also announced that it will enter the 2024 IMSA SportsCar Championship under the GT Daytona Pro (GTD Pro) category through Pfaff Motorsports as its customer team. Both United Autosports and Pfaff Motorsports will be using the McLaren 720S GT3 Evo. In the following month, McLaren Automotive confirmed its participation in the 2024 FIA World Endurance Championship season in the LMGT3 category in collaboration with United Autosports.

== Characteristics ==
McLaren Racing is majority owned by the McLaren Group, having sold 15% of the team to American investors MSP Sports Capital in 2020, rising to a 33% stake in 2022. The team had previously been wholly owned by the Group since its inception.

=== Ownership and management ===
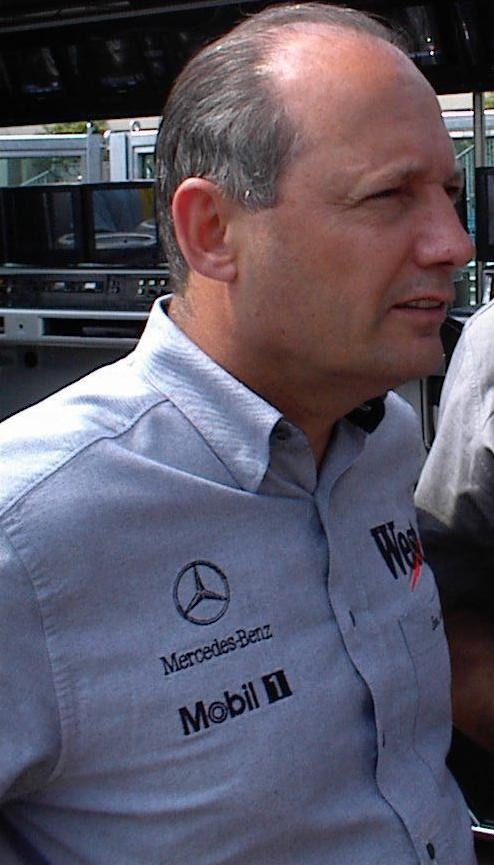
Ron Dennis (pictured at the 2000 Monaco Grand Prix) was team principal from 1980 to 2009 and the chairman of the McLaren Group until 2017.

After Bruce McLaren died in a testing accident in 1970, Teddy Mayer took over the team. In 1981, McLaren merged with Ron Dennis' Project Four Racing; Dennis took over as team principal and shortly after organised a buyout of the original McLaren shareholders to take full control of the team. Dennis offered Mansour Ojjeh the chance to purchase 50% of the team in 1983, with McLaren becoming a joint venture with Ojjeh's TAG Group. In 2000, after supplying engines to the team through its Mercedes subsidiary for 5 years, DaimlerChrysler (now Daimler AG) exercised an option to buy 40% of the TAG McLaren Group. Dennis and Ojjeh each retained a 30% share, and each sold half of their stake to the Mumtalakat Holding Company (the sovereign wealth fund of the Kingdom of Bahrain) in 2007. Although Daimler were reportedly considering acquiring the remaining 60% from Dennis and Ojjeh, they instead bought Brawn GP (renaming it Mercedes GP) in November 2009; their McLaren shares were sold back to Mumtalakat, Dennis, and Ojjeh in 2010.

Dennis stepped down as both CEO and team principal of McLaren in 2009, handing both roles over to Martin Whitmarsh. However, following the uncompetitive 2013 season, Dennis retook the role in January 2014; Whitmarsh formally left the team later that year. Dennis sought to take a controlling interest in the company, but his relationship with Ojjeh had deteriorated, perhaps as early as 2013. In 2016, Dennis was forced out of his role as CEO by Ojjeh. He sold his remaining shares in the company the next year.

After Dennis' 2014 return, he had abolished the position of team principal at McLaren, saying it was an 'outdated' position. Éric Boullier was instead named racing director in January 2014, becoming responsible for the F1 team. After Dennis' exit, Zak Brown was chosen for the post of Group executive director, with the positions of Group CEO and Racing CEO both being left vacant. While his position was formally within the wider McLaren Group, it was understood that his role would focus only on the F1 team. The increasing awareness of the mediocrity of the car prompted a reshuffle in 2018: Brown was appointed McLaren Racing CEO in April, and when Boullier resigned in July, his position was divided between Gil de Ferran as sporting director and Andrea Stella as performance director. In May 2019, Andreas Seidl was appointed as the new team principal. In December 2022, Seidl left McLaren to join Sauber as CEO with Stella promoted to team principal.

Since 2004 the team has been based at the McLaren Technology Centre in Woking, England. Facilities there include a wind tunnel and a driving simulator which is said to be the most sophisticated in the sport. The team also created the McLaren Driver Development Programme.

=== Politics ===
McLaren has had an uneasy relationship with Formula One's governing body, the FIA, and its predecessor FISA, as well as with the commercial rights holders of the sport. McLaren was involved, along with the other teams of the Formula One Constructors Association (FOCA), in a dispute with FISA and Alfa Romeo, Renault, and Ferrari over control of the sport in the early 1980s. During this dispute, known as the FISA-FOCA war, a breakaway series was threatened, FISA refused to sanction one race, and FOCA boycotted another. It was eventually resolved by a revenue-sharing deal called the Concorde Agreement.

Subsequent Concorde Agreements were signed in 1987 and 1992, but in 1996, McLaren was again one of the teams which disputed the terms of a new agreement, this time with former FOCA president Bernie Ecclestone's Formula One Promotions and Administration organisation; a new 10-year agreement was eventually signed in 1998. Similar arguments restarted in the mid-2000s, with McLaren and their part-owner Mercedes again threatening to start a rival series, before another Concorde Agreement was signed in 2009. In 2007, McLaren were involved in an espionage controversy after their chief designer Mike Coughlan obtained confidential technical information from Ferrari. McLaren was excluded from the Constructors' Championship for one year, and the team was fined US$100 million. Although the terms of the most recent agreements, in 2013 and 2021, have been extensively negotiated on, McLaren have not taken as openly hostile a stance as in the past.

During Brown's tenure as CEO, McLaren has been critical of collaboration between teams, particularly Red Bull GmbH's ownership of two teams.

=== Facilities ===
In 2026, McLaren Racing expanded its Indianapolis base with the opening of the McLaren Racing Center, a newly renovated $30 million facility that increased the team's footprint from approximately 33,000 sq ft to around 86,000 sq ft to support its IndyCar operations. The space includes 12 dedicated car bays, indoor space for team haulers, a pit-stop practice area, office space, and an integrated gym and recovery facility.

== Sponsorship, livery and naming ==
=== Title sponsors ===
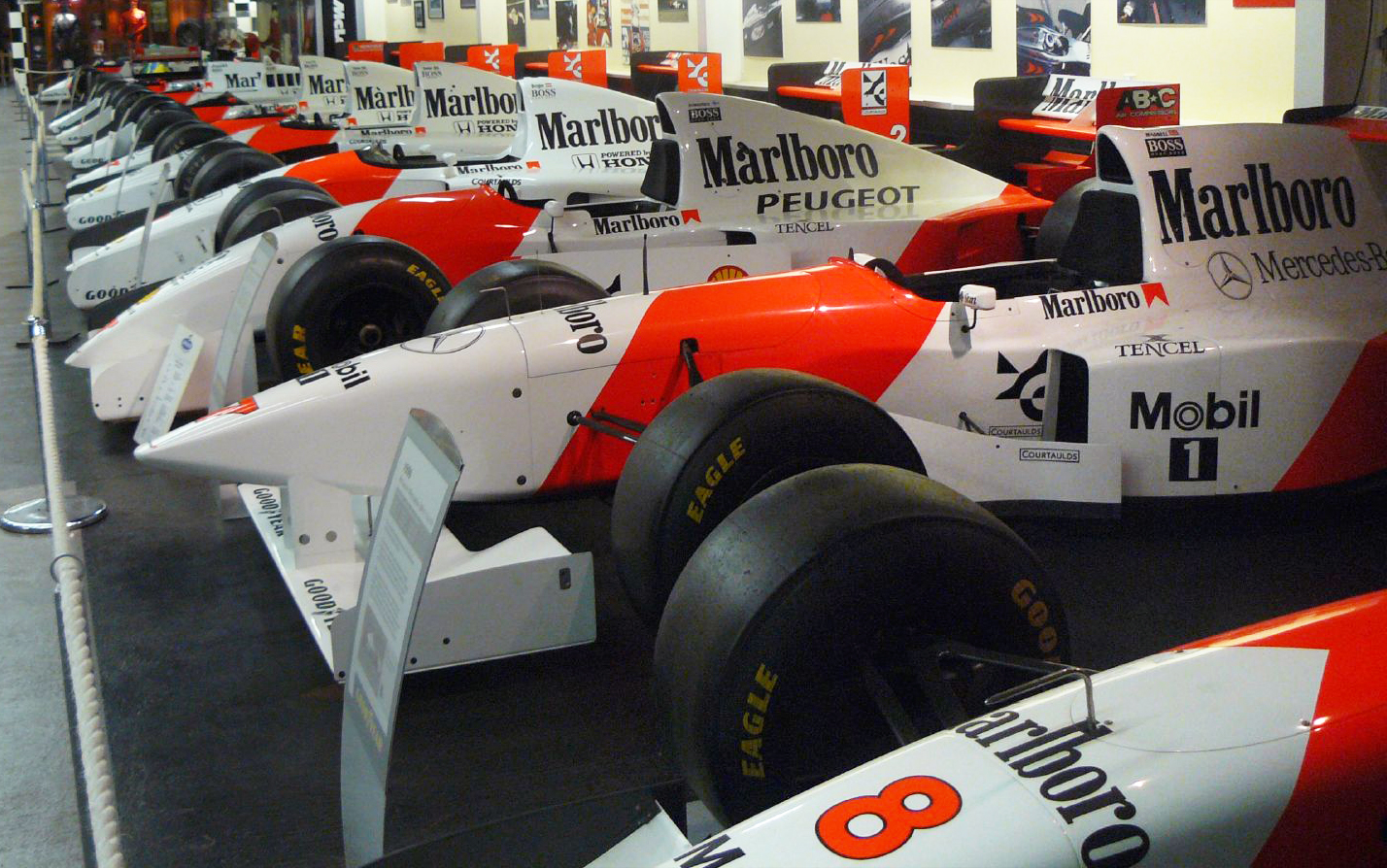
McLaren's Formula One team was sponsored for 23 years by Philip Morris's Marlboro cigarette brand.

In 1968, the Royal Automobile Club and the FIA relaxed the rules regarding commercial sponsorship of Formula One cars. In 1972, Yardley London, a cosmetics company, became McLaren's first title sponsor and the team raced as Yardley Team McLaren. As a result, the livery was changed to a predominantly white one to reflect the sponsor's colours. In 1974, Philip Morris was signed as title sponsor through their Marlboro cigarette brand although one car continued to run-ostensibly by a separate team-with Yardley livery for the year. Marlboro's red-and-white branding lasted until 1996, during which time the team went by the many variants of the Marlboro McLaren name. This partnership was the then longest-running Formula One sponsorship which has since been surpassed by Hugo Boss' sponsorship of the team, which ran from 1981 to 2014. The McLaren–Marlboro title sponsorship deal is still the longest-running in Formula One.

In 1997, Philip Morris moved its Marlboro sponsorship to Ferrari and was replaced by Reemtsma's West cigarette brand, with the team racing as West McLaren Mercedes. As a result, McLaren adopted a silver and black livery. By mid-2005, a European Union directive banned tobacco advertising in sport, which forced McLaren to end its association with West. In 2006, the team competed without a title sponsor, entering under the name Team McLaren Mercedes. McLaren altered their livery to introduce red into the design, and changed the silver to chrome. In 2007, McLaren signed a seven-year contract with telecommunications company Vodafone and competed as Vodafone McLaren Mercedes. The arrangement was due to last until 2014, although the team announced at the 2013 Australian Grand Prix that their partnership would conclude at the end of the 2013 season. Despite explaining the decision to conclude the sponsorship as being a result of Vodafone's desire to reconsider its commercial opportunities, The Times reported that the decision to run the 2012 Bahrain Grand Prix despite an ongoing civil uprising and protests against the race, and Vodafone's inability to remove their logos from the McLaren cars during the race as a factor in the decision to terminate the sponsorship. Diageo-owned whisky brand Johnnie Walker, an associate sponsor since 2005, offered to take over as title sponsor at the end of 2013, but their offer of £43 million was turned down by Ron Dennis, who believed it to be "too small".

In 2015, McLaren was still without a title sponsor and was set to lose a further £20 million in sponsorship in 2016. Between 2015 and 2017, the team competed as McLaren Honda due to their engine partnership with Honda. After splitting with Honda, the team competed as McLaren Formula 1 Team from 2018 onwards. CEO Zak Brown said that he will not sell the name of the team to a title sponsor to keep the team's name intact and to not rely on a single sponsor. Instead, the team will look for major sponsors, which give brands increased branding position on the car. Brown's title sponsor position later shifted and in August 2025, McLaren announced a deal with major sponsor Mastercard and competed as McLaren Mastercard Formula 1 Team from 2026 onwards. The sponsorship is valued at a reported $100 million per season and will run to the mid-2030s. Brown added that the livery will "stay recognisable" despite the title sponsorship.

=== Liveries ===
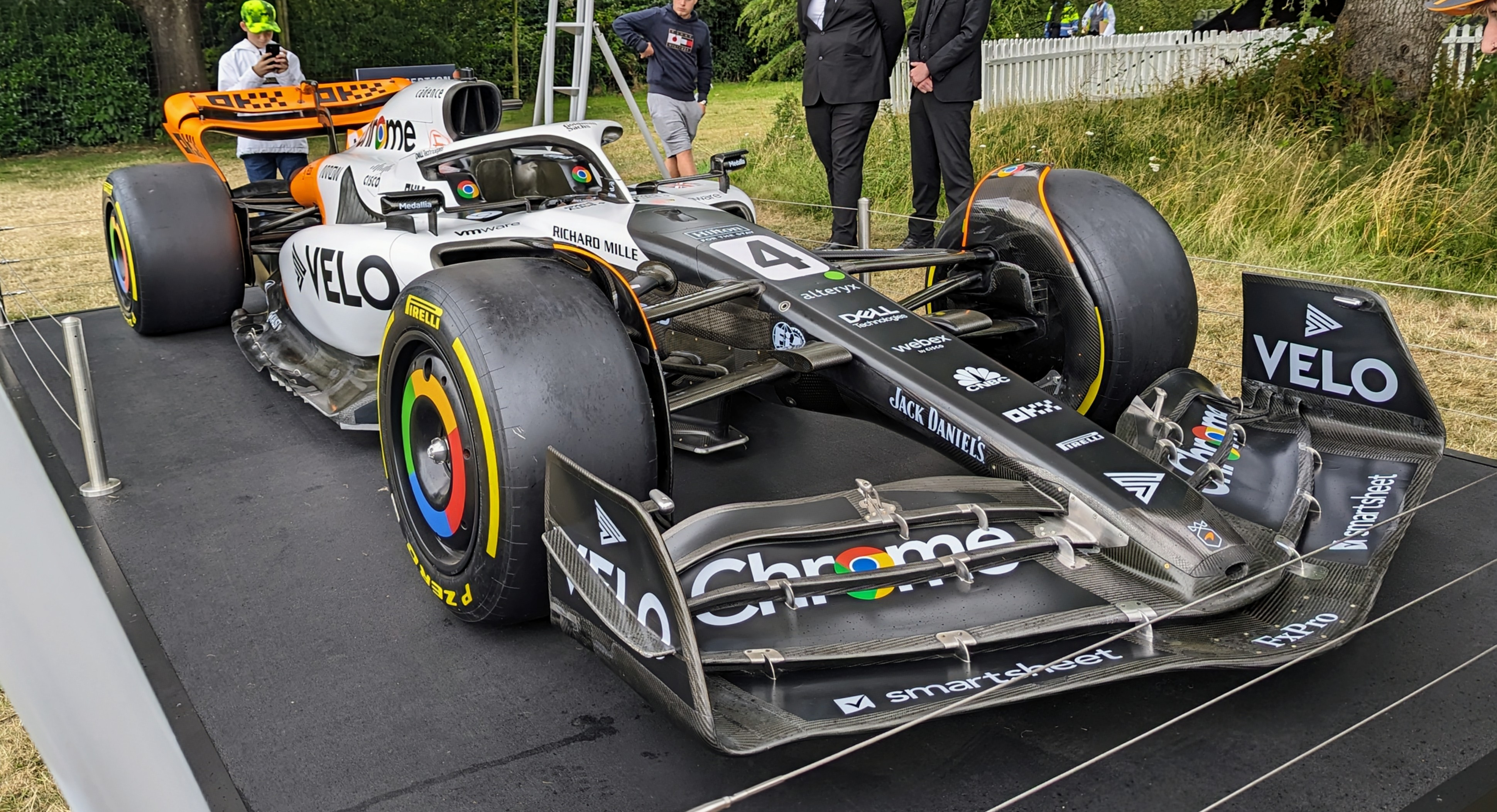

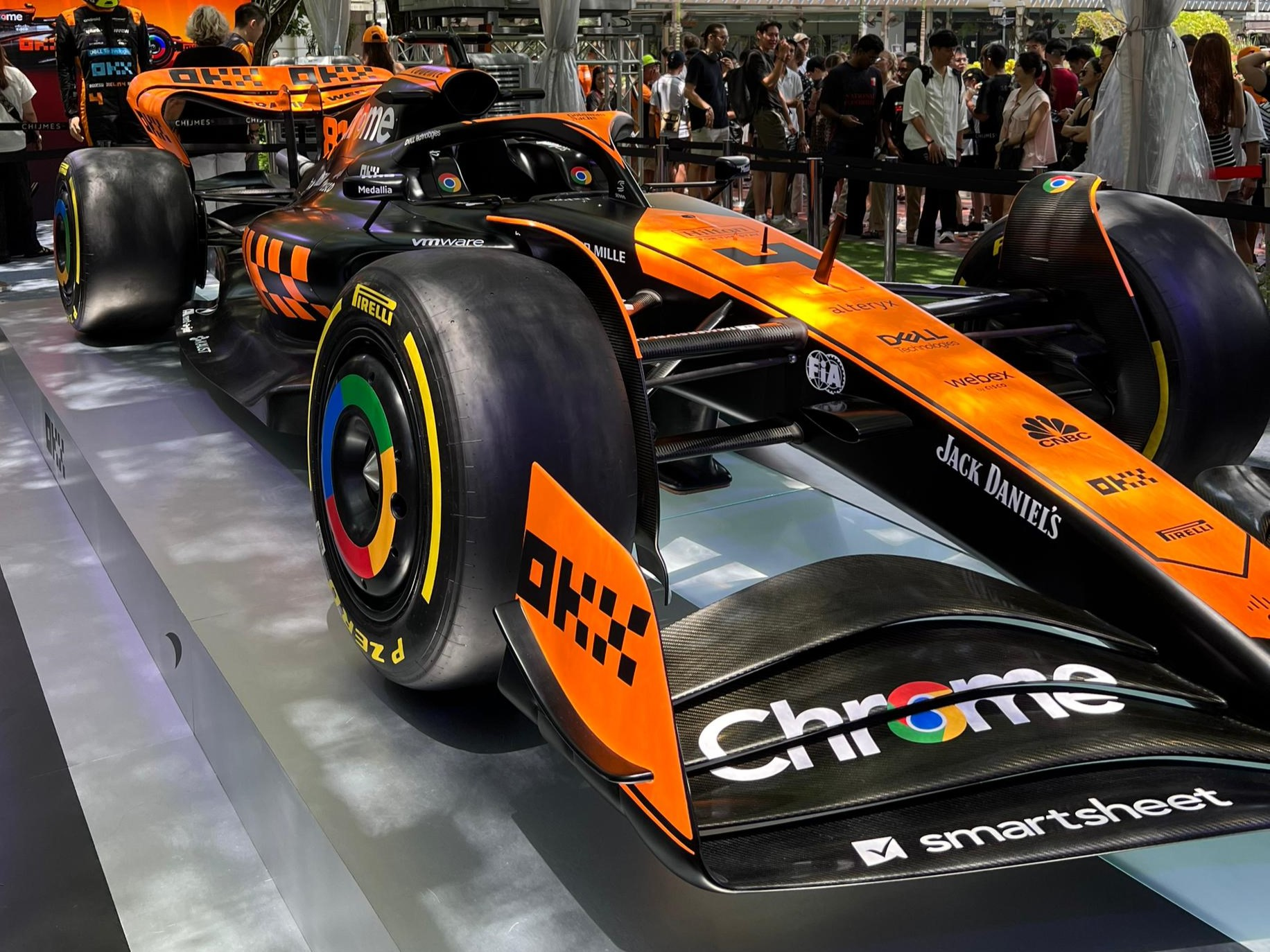
Since 2021, McLaren has used special liveries on their cars in collaboration with their sponsors and to commemorate certain occasions.

In the team's debut race in 1966, it ran white-and-green coloured cars, which came about as a result of a deal with the makers of the film Grand Prix. Between 1968 and 1971, the team used an orange design, dubbed the papaya orange, which was also applied to cars competing in the Indianapolis 500 and Can-Am series, and was used as an interim testing livery in later years. Between 1972 and 2013, McLaren's livery colours reflected the colours of the title sponsors. Since 2017, McLaren returned to its traditional papaya orange colours, which was also used on their cars entered in other racing series such as Extreme E and Formula E.

McLaren have a team tradition where they would run the same design the season after a championship win. The team also would not change the livery substantially during a period of sustained success. Most recently, this was seen with the MCL39 in 2025, which saw minimal changes from the previous year's MCL38 that won McLaren's first Constructors' Championship in 26 years, and the subsequent year's MCL40 after successfully defending the Constructors' Championship and winning the team's first Drivers' Championship in 17 years.

In 2021, as part of McLaren's Gulf Oil sponsorship, the team rolled out a special one-off "heritage" Gulf livery for the Monaco Grand Prix, which then began a trend of one-off special liveries in Formula One. Vuse also partnered with McLaren to race bespoke liveries designed by emerging artists for the 2021 to 2023 Abu Dhabi Grands Prix. McLaren's other sponsors such as OKX, Google Chrome and Jack Daniel's later partnered with the team to race special liveries.

As part of McLaren's 60th-anniversary celebration during the 2023 season, a special livery was raced for the Monaco and Spanish Grands Prix to celebrate their Triple Crown achievement. The Triple Crown livery is the amalgamation of the liveries of the three winning McLaren cars that forms the Triple Crown – the papaya of the M16C/D that won the 1974 Indianapolis 500 at the rear, the white of the MP4/2 that won the 1984 Monaco Grand Prix at the middle, and the black of the F1 GTR that won the 1995 24 Hours of Le Mans at the front of the MCL60. McLaren's IndyCar Series sister team also raced their version of the Triple Crown livery for the Indianapolis 500, with the liveries of the Nos. 7, 6 and 5 painted as the M16C/D, MP4/2, and F1 GTR respectively. At the 2026 Monaco and Barcelona-Catalunya Grands Prix, McLaren raced a special livery to celebrate its 1,000th Grand Prix. The MCL40 was adorned in a bespoke metallic papaya orange and anthracite livery. The livery featured the numbers 0001 and 1000 adorning the sidepods along with details recognising the history of the team (such as the original Bruce McLaren Motor Racing logo on the base of the halo) and important milestones (such as the race dates of the first and 1,000th Grand Prix, respectively, above the numbers 0001 and 1000).

=== Car naming nomenclature ===
McLaren's cars were originally named with the letter M followed by a number, sometimes also followed by a letter denoting the model. After the 1981 merger with Project Four, the cars were called "MP4/x", or since 2001 "MP4-x", where x is the generation of the chassis (e.g. MP4/1, MP4-22). "MP4" stood initially for "Marlboro Project 4", so that the full title of the cars (McLaren MP4/x) reflected not only the historical name of the team, but also the names of the team's major sponsor and its new component part. Since the change of title sponsor in 1997, "MP4" was said to stand for "McLaren Project 4". From 2017, following Ron Dennis' departure from the team, the naming scheme of the cars changed to "MCL" followed by a number. The only deviation to the numbering scheme was 2023's MCL60, which was named for the team's 60th anniversary.

== Race cars ==
As a constructor, McLaren has entered numerous race cars designed in-house into racing events, most prominently Formula One. As of 2025, the only exceptions to this are the Arrow McLaren IndyCar team, who run Dallara-built chassis (initially the IR-12, which was supplemented by the IR-18), McLaren's Extreme E team, who ran the Spark Odyssey 21, and their Formula E operation, who ran Formula E Gen3 with Nissan's powertrain.

Currently, McLaren builds only Formula One cars; the most successful McLaren Formula One car is the McLaren MP4/4 of 1988, also one of the most successful Formula One cars of all time. The MP4/4, driven by teammates Ayrton Senna and Alain Prost, took victories and pole positions in all but one race.

Overview of McLaren race cars
Year	Car	Image	Category
1962	Zerex Special		USAC Road Racing Championship
1963	McLaren M1A		Group 7
1963	McLaren M1B		Group 7
1963	McLaren M1C		Group 7
1965	McLaren M3		Formula Libre
1966	McLaren M2B		Formula One
1967	McLaren M4A		Formula Two
1967	McLaren M4B		Formula One
1967	McLaren M5A		Formula One
1967	McLaren M6A		Group 7
1968	McLaren M6B		Group 7
1968	McLaren M7A		Formula One
1968	McLaren M8A		Group 7
1969	McLaren M7B		Formula One
1969	McLaren M8B		Group 7
1969	McLaren M9A		Formula One
1969	McLaren M10		Formula 5000
1969	McLaren M12		Group 7
1970	McLaren M7C		Formula One
1970	McLaren M8C		Group 7
1970	McLaren M8D		Group 7
1970	McLaren M14A		Formula One
1970	McLaren M14D		Formula One
1970	McLaren M15		IndyCar
1971	McLaren M7D		Formula One
1971	McLaren M8E		Group 7
1971	McLaren M8F		Group 7
1971	McLaren M16		IndyCar
1971	McLaren M18		Formula 5000
1971	McLaren M19A		Formula One
1971	McLaren M19C		Formula One
1972	McLaren M16B		IndyCar
1972	McLaren M20		Group 7
1972	McLaren M21		Formula Two
1972	McLaren M22		Formula 5000
1973	McLaren M16C		IndyCar
1973	McLaren M23		Formula One
1973	McLaren M25		Formula 5000
1974	McLaren M16C/D		IndyCar
1975	McLaren M16E		IndyCar
1976	McLaren M26		Formula One
1977	McLaren M24		IndyCar
1979	McLaren M28		Formula One
1979	McLaren M29		Formula One
1980	McLaren M30		Formula One
1981	McLaren MP4		Formula One
1982	McLaren C8		Group C
1982	McLaren MP4B		Formula One
1983	McLaren MP4/1C		Formula One
1983	McLaren MP4/1E		Formula One
1984	McLaren MP4/2		Formula One
1985	McLaren MP4/2B		Formula One
1986	McLaren MP4/2C		Formula One
1987	McLaren MP4/3		Formula One
1988	McLaren MP4/4		Formula One
1989	McLaren MP4/5		Formula One
1990	McLaren MP4/5B		Formula One
1991	McLaren MP4/6		Formula One
1992	McLaren MP4/6B		Formula One
1992	McLaren MP4/7A		Formula One
1993	McLaren MP4/8		Formula One
1994	McLaren MP4/9		Formula One
1995	McLaren F1 GTR		Group GT1
1995	McLaren MP4/10		Formula One
1995	McLaren MP4/10B		Formula One
1995	McLaren MP4/10C		Formula One
1996	McLaren MP4/11		Formula One
1997	McLaren MP4/12		Formula One
1998	McLaren MP4/13		Formula One
1999	McLaren MP4/14		Formula One
2000	McLaren MP4/15		Formula One
2001	McLaren MP4-16		Formula One
2002	McLaren MP4-17		Formula One
2003	McLaren MP4-17D		Formula One
2003	McLaren MP4-18		Formula One
2004	McLaren MP4-19		Formula One
2004	McLaren MP4-19B		Formula One
2005	McLaren F1 GTR		GT500
2005	McLaren MP4-20		Formula One
2006	McLaren MP4-21		Formula One
2007	McLaren MP4-22		Formula One
2008	McLaren MP4-23		Formula One
2009	McLaren MP4-24		Formula One
2010	McLaren MP4-25		Formula One
2011	McLaren MP4-26		Formula One
2012	McLaren 12C GT3		Group GT3
2012	McLaren MP4-27		Formula One
2013	McLaren MP4-28		Formula One
2014	McLaren MP4-29		Formula One
2015	McLaren 650S GT3		Group GT3
2015	McLaren MP4-30		Formula One
2016	McLaren MP4-31		Formula One
2017	McLaren 570S GT4		SRO GT4
2017	McLaren MCL32		Formula One
2018	McLaren MCL33		Formula One
2019	McLaren 720S GT3		Group GT3
2019	McLaren MCL34		Formula One
2020	McLaren MCL35		Formula One
2021	McLaren MCL35M		Formula One
2022	McLaren MCL36		Formula One
2023	McLaren Artura GT4		SRO GT4
2023	McLaren MCL60		Formula One
2024	McLaren MCL38		Formula One
2025	McLaren MCL39		Formula One
2026	McLaren MCL40		Formula One
2027	McLaren MCL-HY		LMDh

== Racing results ==
=== Formula One results ===
- Constructors' Championships winning percentage: 16.4%
- Drivers' Championships winning percentage: 21.3%
- Winning percentage: 20.2%

Formula One results
(italics indicates non-works entries; **bold** indicates championships won)
Year	Name	Car	Engine	Tyres	No.	Drivers	Points	WCC
1966	(United Kingdom) Bruce McLaren Motor Racing	M2B	Ford 406 3.0 V8; Serenissima M166 3.0 V8	F	—N/a (Note: Individual driver numbers were not allocated at the time, as numbers differed by event.)	(New Zealand) Bruce McLaren	2; 1	9th 12th
1967	(United Kingdom) Bruce McLaren Motor Racing	M4B; M5A	BRM P56 2.0 V8; BRM P142 3.0 V12	G	—N/a	(New Zealand) Bruce McLaren	3	10th
1968	(United Kingdom) Bruce McLaren Motor Racing	M5A; M7A	BRM P142 3.0 V12; Ford-Cosworth DFV 3.0 V8	G	—N/a	(New Zealand) Denny Hulme (New Zealand) Bruce McLaren	3; 49	10th 2nd
1969	(United Kingdom) Bruce McLaren Motor Racing	M7A; M7B; M7C; M9A	Ford-Cosworth DFV 3.0 V8	G	—N/a	(New Zealand) Bruce McLaren (New Zealand) Denny Hulme (United Kingdom) Derek Bell	38 (40)	5th
1970	(United Kingdom) Bruce McLaren Motor Racing	M7D; M14A; M14D	Ford-Cosworth DFV 3.0 V8; Alfa Romeo T33 3.0 V8	G	—N/a	(New Zealand) Bruce McLaren (New Zealand) Denny Hulme (United Kingdom) Peter Gethin (United States) Dan Gurney (Italy) Andrea de Adamich (Italy) Nanni Galli	35; 0	5th NC
1971	(United Kingdom) Bruce McLaren Motor Racing	M14A; M19A	Ford-Cosworth DFV 3.0 V8	G	—N/a	(New Zealand) Denny Hulme (United Kingdom) Peter Gethin (United Kingdom) Jackie Oliver	10	6th
1972	(United Kingdom) Yardley Team McLaren	M19A; M19C	Ford-Cosworth DFV 3.0 V8	G	—N/a	(New Zealand) Denny Hulme (United States) Peter Revson (United Kingdom) Brian Redman (South Africa) Jody Scheckter	47 (49)	3rd
1973	(United Kingdom) Yardley Team McLaren	M19A; M19C; M23	Ford-Cosworth DFV 3.0 V8	G	—N/a	(New Zealand) Denny Hulme (United States) Peter Revson (South Africa) Jody Scheckter (Belgium) Jacky Ickx	58	3rd
1974	(United Kingdom) Yardley Team McLaren (United Kingdom) Marlboro Team Texaco	M23	Ford-Cosworth DFV 3.0 V8	G	5. 6. 33. 33. 33.	(Brazil) **Emerson Fittipaldi** (New Zealand) Denny Hulme (United Kingdom) Mike Hailwood (United Kingdom) David Hobbs (Germany) Jochen Mass	**73 (75)**	**1st**
1975	(United Kingdom) Marlboro Team Texaco	M23	Ford-Cosworth DFV 3.0 V8	G	1. 2.	(Brazil) Emerson Fittipaldi (Germany) Jochen Mass	53	3rd
1976	(United Kingdom) Marlboro Team McLaren	M23; M26	Ford-Cosworth DFV 3.0 V8	G	11. 12.	(United Kingdom) **James Hunt** (Germany) Jochen Mass	74 (75)	2nd
1977	(United Kingdom) Marlboro Team McLaren	M23; M26	Ford-Cosworth DFV 3.0 V8	G	1. 2. 14. 40.	(United Kingdom) James Hunt (Germany) Jochen Mass (Italy) Bruno Giacomelli (Canada) Gilles Villeneuve	60	3rd
1978	(United Kingdom) Marlboro Team McLaren	M26	Ford-Cosworth DFV 3.0 V8	G	7. 8. 33.	(United Kingdom) James Hunt (France) Patrick Tambay (Italy) Bruno Giacomelli	15	8th
1979	(United Kingdom) Marlboro Team McLaren (United Kingdom) Löwenbräu Team McLaren	M26; M28; M28B; M28C; M29	Ford-Cosworth DFV 3.0 V8	G	7. 8.	(United Kingdom) John Watson (France) Patrick Tambay	15	7th
1980	(United Kingdom) Marlboro Team McLaren	M29B; M29C; M30	Ford-Cosworth DFV 3.0 V8	G	7. 8. 8.	(United Kingdom) John Watson (France) Alain Prost (United Kingdom) Stephen South	11	9th
1981	(United Kingdom) Marlboro McLaren International	M29C; M29F; MP4	Ford-Cosworth DFV 3.0 V8	M	7. 8.	(United Kingdom) John Watson (Italy) Andrea de Cesaris	28	6th
1982	(United Kingdom) Marlboro McLaren International	MP4B	Ford-Cosworth DFV 3.0 V8	M	7. 8.	(United Kingdom) John Watson (Austria) Niki Lauda	69	2nd
1983	(United Kingdom) Marlboro McLaren International	MP4/1C; MP4/1E	Ford-Cosworth DFV 3.0 V8; TAG-Porsche 1.5 V6 t	M	7. 8.	(United Kingdom) John Watson (Austria) Niki Lauda	34; 0	5th NC
1984	(United Kingdom) Marlboro McLaren International	MP4/2	TAG-Porsche 1.5 V6 t	M	7. 8.	(Austria) **Niki Lauda** (France) Alain Prost	**143.5**	**1st**
1985	(United Kingdom) Marlboro McLaren International	MP4/2B	TAG-Porsche 1.5 V6 t	G	1. 1. 2.	(Austria) Niki Lauda (United Kingdom) John Watson (France) **Alain Prost**	**90**	**1st**
1986	(United Kingdom) Marlboro McLaren International	MP4/2C	TAG-Porsche 1.5 V6 t	G	1. 2.	(France) **Alain Prost** (Finland) Keke Rosberg	96	2nd
1987	(United Kingdom) Marlboro McLaren International	MP4/3	TAG-Porsche 1.5 V6 t	G	1. 2.	(France) Alain Prost (Sweden) Stefan Johansson	76	2nd
1988	(United Kingdom) Honda Marlboro McLaren	MP4/4	Honda RA168E 1.5 V6 t	G	11. 12.	(France) Alain Prost (Brazil) **Ayrton Senna**	**199**	**1st**
1989	(United Kingdom) Honda Marlboro McLaren	MP4/5	Honda RA109E 3.5 V10	G	1. 2.	(Brazil) Ayrton Senna (France) **Alain Prost**	**141**	**1st**
1990	(United Kingdom) Honda Marlboro McLaren	MP4/5B	Honda RA100E 3.5 V10	G	27. 28.	(Brazil) **Ayrton Senna** (Austria) Gerhard Berger	**121**	**1st**
1991	(United Kingdom) Honda Marlboro McLaren	MP4/6	Honda RA121E 3.5 V12	G	1. 2.	(Brazil) **Ayrton Senna** (Austria) Gerhard Berger	**139**	**1st**
1992	(United Kingdom) Honda Marlboro McLaren	MP4/6B; MP4/7A	Honda RA122E 3.5 V12; Honda RA122E/B 3.5 V12	G	1. 2.	(Brazil) Ayrton Senna (Austria) Gerhard Berger	99	2nd
1993	(United Kingdom) Marlboro McLaren	MP4/8	Ford HBE7 3.5 V8	G	7. 7. 8.	(United States) Michael Andretti (Finland) Mika Häkkinen (Brazil) Ayrton Senna	84	2nd
1994	(United Kingdom) Marlboro McLaren Peugeot	MP4/9	Peugeot A6 3.5 V10	G	7. 7. 8.	(Finland) Mika Häkkinen (France) Philippe Alliot (United Kingdom) Martin Brundle	42	4th
1995	(United Kingdom) Marlboro McLaren Mercedes	MP4/10; MP4/10B; MP4/10C	Mercedes FO 110 3.0 V10	G	7. 7. 8. 8.	(United Kingdom) Mark Blundell (United Kingdom) Nigel Mansell (Finland) Mika Häkkinen (Denmark) Jan Magnussen	30	4th
1996	(United Kingdom) Marlboro McLaren Mercedes	MP4/11	Mercedes FO 110 3.0 V10	G	7. 8.	(Finland) Mika Häkkinen (United Kingdom) David Coulthard	49	4th
1997	(United Kingdom) West McLaren Mercedes	MP4/12	Mercedes FO 110E 3.0 V10; Mercedes FO 110F 3.0 V10	G	9. 10.	(Finland) Mika Häkkinen (United Kingdom) David Coulthard	63	4th
1998	(United Kingdom) West McLaren Mercedes	MP4/13	Mercedes FO 110G 3.0 V10	B	7. 8.	(United Kingdom) David Coulthard (Finland) **Mika Häkkinen**	**156**	**1st**
1999	(United Kingdom) West McLaren Mercedes	MP4/14	Mercedes FO 110H 3.0 V10	B	1. 2.	(Finland) **Mika Häkkinen** (United Kingdom) David Coulthard	124	2nd
2000	(United Kingdom) West McLaren Mercedes	MP4/15	Mercedes FO 110J 3.0 V10	B	1. 2.	(Finland) Mika Häkkinen (United Kingdom) David Coulthard	152	2nd
2001	(United Kingdom) West McLaren Mercedes	MP4-16	Mercedes FO 110K 3.0 V10	B	3. 4.	(Finland) Mika Häkkinen (United Kingdom) David Coulthard	102	2nd
2002	(United Kingdom) West McLaren Mercedes	MP4-17	Mercedes FO 110M 3.0 V10	M	3. 4.	(United Kingdom) David Coulthard (Finland) Kimi Räikkönen	65	3rd
2003	(United Kingdom) West McLaren Mercedes	MP4-17D	Mercedes FO 110M 3.0 V10; Mercedes FO 110P 3.0 V10	M	5. 6.	(United Kingdom) David Coulthard (Finland) Kimi Räikkönen	142	3rd
2004	(United Kingdom) West McLaren Mercedes	MP4-19; MP4-19B	Mercedes FO 110Q 3.0 V10	M	5. 6.	(United Kingdom) David Coulthard (Finland) Kimi Räikkönen	69	5th
2005	(United Kingdom) West McLaren Mercedes (United Kingdom) Team McLaren Mercedes	MP4-20	Mercedes FO 110R 3.0 V10	M	9. 10. 10. 10.	(Finland) Kimi Räikkönen (Colombia) Juan Pablo Montoya (Spain) Pedro de la Rosa (Austria) Alexander Wurz	182	2nd
2006	(United Kingdom) Team McLaren Mercedes	MP4-21	Mercedes FO 108S 2.4 V8	M	3. 4. 4.	(Finland) Kimi Räikkönen (Colombia) Juan Pablo Montoya (Spain) Pedro de la Rosa	110	3rd
2007	(United Kingdom) Vodafone McLaren Mercedes	MP4-22	Mercedes FO 108T 2.4 V8	B	1. 2.	(Spain) Fernando Alonso (United Kingdom) Lewis Hamilton	0 (Note: The World Motorsport Council disqualified McLaren from the 2007 Constructors' Championship as punishment for the 2007 Formula One espionage controversy. McLaren was stripped of its Constructors' Championship points, and Formula One's website states that the team scored zero points in 2007. At the time McLaren was disqualified (prior to the 2007 Belgian Grand Prix, with four rounds left in the season), McLaren led the Constructors' Championship with 166 points to Ferrari's 143. The two McLaren drivers were not disqualified from the Drivers' Championship, and they collectively scored 218 points. However, earlier in the season, McLaren had received a 15-point deduction due to a separate controversy at the 2007 Hungarian Grand Prix. As such, in the purely hypothetical circumstance that McLaren (1) was not disqualified from the Constructors' Championship, (2) recorded the exact same results that it did in real life, (3) lost its appeal of the Hungary deduction, and (4) did not receive a second points penalty in lieu of the season disqualification, McLaren would have scored 203 points, one point behind Ferrari.)	EX
2008	(United Kingdom) Vodafone McLaren Mercedes	MP4-23	Mercedes FO 108T 2.4 V8	B	22. 23.	(United Kingdom) **Lewis Hamilton** (Finland) Heikki Kovalainen	151	2nd
2009	(United Kingdom) Vodafone McLaren Mercedes	MP4-24	Mercedes FO 108W 2.4 V8	B	1. 2.	(United Kingdom) Lewis Hamilton (Finland) Heikki Kovalainen	71	3rd
2010	(United Kingdom) Vodafone McLaren Mercedes	MP4-25	Mercedes FO 108X 2.4 V8	B	1. 2.	(United Kingdom) Jenson Button (United Kingdom) Lewis Hamilton	454	2nd
2011	(United Kingdom) Vodafone McLaren Mercedes	MP4-26	Mercedes FO 108Y 2.4 V8	P	3. 4.	(United Kingdom) Lewis Hamilton (United Kingdom) Jenson Button	497	2nd
2012	(United Kingdom) Vodafone McLaren Mercedes	MP4-27	Mercedes FO 108Z 2.4 V8	P	3. 4.	(United Kingdom) Jenson Button (United Kingdom) Lewis Hamilton	378	3rd
2013	(United Kingdom) Vodafone McLaren Mercedes	MP4-28	Mercedes FO 108F 2.4 V8	P	5. 6.	(United Kingdom) Jenson Button (Mexico) Sergio Pérez	122	5th
2014	(United Kingdom) McLaren Mercedes	MP4-29	Mercedes PU106A Hybrid 1.6 V6 t	P	20. 22.	(Denmark) Kevin Magnussen (United Kingdom) Jenson Button	181	5th
2015	(United Kingdom) McLaren Honda	MP4-30	Honda RA615H 1.6 V6 t	P	14. 20. 22.	(Spain) Fernando Alonso (Denmark) Kevin Magnussen (United Kingdom) Jenson Button	27	9th
2016	(United Kingdom) McLaren Honda	MP4-31	Honda RA616H 1.6 V6 t	P	14. 22. 47.	(Spain) Fernando Alonso (United Kingdom) Jenson Button (Belgium) Stoffel Vandoorne	76	6th
2017	(United Kingdom) McLaren Honda	MCL32	Honda RA617H 1.6 V6 t	P	2. 14. 22.	(Belgium) Stoffel Vandoorne (Spain) Fernando Alonso (United Kingdom) Jenson Button	30	9th
2018	(United Kingdom) McLaren F1 Team	MCL33	Renault R.E.18 1.6 V6 t	P	2. 14.	(Belgium) Stoffel Vandoorne (Spain) Fernando Alonso	62	6th
2019	(United Kingdom) McLaren F1 Team	MCL34	Renault E-Tech 19 1.6 V6 t	P	4. 55.	(United Kingdom) Lando Norris (Spain) Carlos Sainz Jr.	145	4th
2020	(United Kingdom) McLaren F1 Team	MCL35	Renault E-Tech 20 1.6 V6 t	P	4. 55.	(United Kingdom) Lando Norris (Spain) Carlos Sainz Jr.	202	3rd
2021	(United Kingdom) McLaren F1 Team	MCL35M	Mercedes M12 E Performance 1.6 V6 t	P	3. 4.	(Australia) Daniel Ricciardo (United Kingdom) Lando Norris	275	4th
2022	(United Kingdom) McLaren F1 Team	MCL36	Mercedes M13 E Performance 1.6 V6 t	P	3. 4.	(Australia) Daniel Ricciardo (United Kingdom) Lando Norris	159	5th
2023	(United Kingdom) McLaren Formula 1 Team	MCL60	Mercedes M14 E Performance 1.6 V6 t	P	4. 81.	(United Kingdom) Lando Norris (Australia) Oscar Piastri	302	4th
2024	(United Kingdom) McLaren Formula 1 Team	MCL38	Mercedes M15 E Performance 1.6 V6 t	P	4. 81.	(United Kingdom) Lando Norris (Australia) Oscar Piastri	**666**	**1st**
2025	(United Kingdom) McLaren Formula 1 Team	MCL39	Mercedes M16 E Performance 1.6 V6 t	P	4. 81.	(United Kingdom) **Lando Norris** (Australia) Oscar Piastri	833	1st
2026	(United Kingdom) McLaren Mastercard F1 Team	MCL40	Mercedes M17 E Performance 1.6 V6 t	P	1. 81.	(United Kingdom) Lando Norris (Australia) Oscar Piastri	398*	4th*
* Season still in progress.

==== Drivers' champions ====
Eight drivers have won a total of thirteen Drivers' Championships with McLaren:

- (Brazil) Emerson Fittipaldi (1974)
- (United Kingdom) James Hunt (1976)
- (Austria) Niki Lauda (1984)
- (France) Alain Prost (1985, 1986, 1989)
- (Brazil) Ayrton Senna (1988, 1990, 1991)
- (Finland) Mika Häkkinen (1998, 1999)
- (United Kingdom) Lewis Hamilton (2008)
- (United Kingdom) Lando Norris (2025)

=== Esports ===
Year	Name	No.	Drivers	Points	WCC
2018	(United Kingdom) McLaren Shadow	20. 12. 32.	(Netherlands) Bono Huis (Italy) Enzo Bonito (Finland) Olli Pahkala	101	4th
2019	(United Kingdom) McLaren Shadow	20. 12. 23.	(Netherlands) Bono Huis (Italy) Enzo Bonito (Netherlands) Allert van der Wal	105	6th
2020	(United Kingdom) McLaren Shadow	25. 28. N.A.	(Spain) Dani Moreno (United Kingdom) James Baldwin (France) Matthias Collogon	80	6th
2021	(United Kingdom) McLaren Shadow	20. 12. 32.	(Iran) Bari Broumand (Hungary) Daniel Berezmay (United Kingdom) Josh Idowu	108	6th
2022	(United Kingdom) McLaren Shadow	88. 7. 13.	(United Kingdom) Lucas Blakeley (Iran) Bari Broumand (United Kingdom) Wilson Hughes	**330**	**1st**
2023-24	(United Kingdom) McLaren Shadow	12. 88. 26.	(United Kingdom) Jarno Wilson Hughes (United Kingdom) Lucas Blakeley (Spain) Dani Moreno	83	6th
2025	(United Kingdom) McLaren Shadow	12. 88. 41.	(United Kingdom) Jarno Wilson Hughes (United Kingdom) Lucas Blakeley (United Kingdom) Alfie Butcher	107	7th
2026	(United Kingdom) McLaren F1 Sim Racing	25. 41. 42.	(United Kingdom) Jake Benham (United Kingdom) Alfie Butcher (United Kingdom) Wilson Hughes	125	5th

* Season still in progress

==== Esports Drivers' Champions ====
The following drivers won the Formula One Esports Drivers' Championship for McLaren Shadows:

- (United Kingdom) Lucas Blakeley (2022).

==== Complete F1 Esports Series results ====
(key) (results in bold indicate pole position; results in italics indicate fastest lap)

Year	Drivers	1	2	3	4	5	6	7	8	9	10	11	12	Points	WCC
2018		AUS	CHN	AZE	FRA	GBR	BEL	GER	SIN	USA	ABU			101	4th
2018	(Netherlands) Bono Huis	10	7	4	8	10	14			9	2			101	4th
2018	(Italy) Enzo Bonito		16	6	10	18	18	12	**18**	8	4			101	4th
2018	(Finland) Olli Pahkala	16						11	9					101	4th
2019		BHR	CHN	AZE	CAN	RBR	GBR	GER	BEL	ITA	JPN	USA	BRA	105	6th
2019	(Netherlands) Bono Huis	10	6	5	7	7	14	6	5	7	12	8	19	105	6th
2019	(Italy) Enzo Bonito	6	12	17	16	6	13	18	15	5	9	2	17	105	6th
2019	(Netherlands) Allert van der Wal													105	6th
2020		BHR	VIE	CHN	NED	CAN	RBR	GBR	BEL	ITA	JPN	MEX	BRA	80	6th
2020	(Spain) Dani Moreno	8	19	9	7	5	14	2	13	9	6	5	5	80	6th
2020	(United Kingdom) James Baldwin	13	20	13	18	9		20	19	19	19	8	8	80	6th
2020	(France) Matthias Cologon						15							80	6th
2021		BHR	CHN	RBR	GBR	ITA	BEL	POR	NED	USA	EMI	MEX	BRA	108	6th
2021	(Iran) Bari Broumand	6	**5**	3	5	6	8	10	**4**	4	18	2	17	108	6th
2021	(Hungary) Daniel Bereznay	14		12		11	Ret	14		15				108	6th
2021	(United Kingdom) Josh Idowu		12		11				18		**11**	14	5	108	6th
2022		BHR	EMI	GBR	RBR	BEL	NED	ITA	MEX	USA	JPN	BRA	UAE	330	1st
2022	(United Kingdom) Lucas Blakeley	**1**	1	3	6	4	1	6	7	6	4	**1**	4	330	1st
2022	(Iran) Bari Broumand	3	7	16	7	1	2	2	2	4	5	3	7	330	1st
2022	(United Kingdom) Wilson Hughes													330	1st
2023–24		BHR	JED	RBR	GBR	BEL	NED	USA	MEX	BRA	LVG	QAT	UAE	83	6th
2023–24	(United Kingdom) Wilson Hughes	19	6	8	20	11			14	14			12	83	6th
2023–24	(United Kingdom) Lucas Blakeley	17	4	14	6	2	6	**4**	13	6	9	18	16	83	6th
2023–24	(Spain) Dani Moreno						13	15			13	9		83	6th
2025		AUS	CHN	BHR	SAU	GBR	BEL	NED	USA	MXC	SAP	QAT	ABU	107	7th
2025	(United Kingdom) Wilson Hughes													107	7th
2025	(United Kingdom) Lucas Blakeley	19	11	16	12	5	18	20	11	10	16	10	12	107	7th
2025	(United Kingdom) Alfie Butcher	15	5	7	4	13	1	10	20	8	16	13	2	107	7th
2026		CHN	JPN	BHR	SAU	CAT	GBR	BEL	NED	USA	MXC	SAP	ABU	125	5th
2026	(United Kingdom) Jake Benham	12	3	9	16	8	16	15	7	15	13	18	2	125	5th
2026	(United Kingdom) Alfie Butcher	3	7	Ret	10	5	6	10	6	9	2	7	9	125	5th
2026	(United Kingdom) Wilson Hughes													125	5th

* Season still in progress

=== American open-wheel racing results ===
(key)

American open-wheel racing results
Year	Chassis	Engine	Tyres	Drivers	1	2	3	4	5	6	7	8	9	10	11	12	13	14	15	16	17	18
1970	McLaren M15	Offenhauser 159 I4 t	G		PHX1	SON	TRE1	INDY	MIL1	LAN	CDR	MIC	IRP	SPR	MIL2	ONT	DQSF	ISF	SED	TRE2	SAC	PHX2
1970	McLaren M15	Offenhauser 159 I4 t	G	(New Zealand) Chris Amon				DNQ														
1970	McLaren M15	Offenhauser 159 I4 t	G	(United States) Peter Revson				22								8						
1970	McLaren M15	Offenhauser 159 I4 t	G	(New Zealand) Denny Hulme				DNQ														
1970	McLaren M15	Offenhauser 159 I4 t	G	(United States) Carl Williams				9														
1970	McLaren M15	Offenhauser 159 I4 t	G	(New Zealand) Bruce McLaren				DNQ														
1971	McLaren M16A	Offenhauser 159 I4 t	G		RAF		PHX1	TRE1	INDY	MIL1	POC	MIC	MIL2	ONT	TRE2	PHX2						
1971	McLaren M16A	Offenhauser 159 I4 t	G	(New Zealand) Denny Hulme					17													
1971	McLaren M16A	Offenhauser 159 I4 t	G	(United States) Gordon Johncock										27								
1971	McLaren M16A	Offenhauser 159 I4 t	G	(United States) Peter Revson					**2**		21			7								
1972	McLaren M16A	Offenhauser 159 I4 t	G		PHX	TRE	INDY	MIL	MIC	POC	MIL	ONT	TRE	PHX								
1972	McLaren M16A	Offenhauser 159 I4 t	G	(United States) Gordon Johncock		3																
1972	McLaren M16B	Offenhauser 159 I4 t	G	(United States) Gordon Johncock			20		9	22		13	20									
1972	McLaren M16B	Offenhauser 159 I4 t	G	(United States) Peter Revson			31			31		23										
1973	McLaren M16C	Offenhauser 159 I4 t	G		TXS	TRE		INDY	MIL	POC	MIC	MIL	ONT			MIC		TRE	TXS	PHX		
1973	McLaren M16C	Offenhauser 159 I4 t	G	(United States) Peter Revson				31		**21**					**23**							
1973	McLaren M16C	Offenhauser 159 I4 t	G	(United States) Johnny Rutherford	4	15		**9**	5	5	2	18		**1**	31	3	1	4	2	DNQ		
1974	McLaren M16C/D	Offenhauser 159 I4 t	G		ONT			PHX1	TRE1	INDY	MIL1	POC	MIC1	MIL2	MIC2	TRE2	TRE3	PHX2				
1974	McLaren M16C/D	Offenhauser 159 I4 t	G	(United Kingdom) David Hobbs						5												
1974	McLaren M16C/D	Offenhauser 159 I4 t	G	(United States) Johnny Rutherford		**1**	27	7	6	1	1	1	4	5	9	4	7	**7**				
1975	McLaren M16E	Offenhauser 159 I4 t	G		ONT			PHX1	TRE1	INDY	MIL1	POC	MIC1	MIL2	MIC2	TRE2	PHX2					
1975	McLaren M16E	Offenhauser 159 I4 t	G	(United States) Johnny Rutherford		2	17	1	2	2	3	6	6	**13**	2	3	11					
1976	McLaren M16E	Offenhauser 159 I4 t	G		PHX1	TRE1	INDY	MIL1	POC	MIC1	TXS1	TRE2	MIL2	ONT	MIC2	TXS2	PHX2					
1976	McLaren M16E	Offenhauser 159 I4 t	G	(United States) Johnny Rutherford	18	1	**1**	9	4	2	3	7	**3**	2	11	1	16					
1977	McLaren M24	Cosworth DFX V8 t	G		ONT1	PHX1	TXS1	TRE	INDY	MIL1	POC	MOS	MIC1	TXS2	MIL2	ONT2	MIC2	PHX2				
1977	McLaren M24	Cosworth DFX V8 t	G	(United States) Johnny Rutherford	**25**	**1**	**4**	**8**	33	1	5	9	3	1	1	**24**	2	22				
1978	McLaren M24B	Cosworth DFX V8 t	G		PHX1	ONT1	TXS1	TRE1	INDY	MOS	MIL1	POC	MIC1	ATL	TXS2	MIL2	ONT2	MIC2	TRE2	SIL	BRH	PHX2
1978	McLaren M24B	Cosworth DFX V8 t	G	(United States) Johnny Rutherford	16	13	19	10	13	8	2	2	1	2	2	8	11	**13**	11	5	3	1
1979	McLaren M24B	Cosworth DFX V8 t	G		PHX	ATL		INDY	TRE		MCH		WGL	TRE	ONT	MCH	ATL	PHX				
1979	McLaren M24B	Cosworth DFX V8 t	G	(United States) Johnny Rutherford	3	**1**	**1**	18	15	3	3	11	15	5	4	4	11	6				
McLaren-Honda-Andretti
2017	Dallara DW12	Honda HI17TT V6 t	F		STP	LBH	ALA	PHX	IMS	INDY	DET		TEX	ROA	IOW	TOR	MOH	POC	GAT	WGL	SNM	
2017	Dallara DW12	Honda HI17TT V6 t	F	(Spain) Fernando Alonso^{1}						24												
McLaren Racing
2019	Dallara DW12	Chevrolet V6 t	F		STP	COA	ALA	LBH	IMS	INDY	DET		TXS	RDA	TOR	IOW	MOH	POC	GTW	POR	LAG	
2019	Dallara DW12	Chevrolet V6 t	F	(Spain) Fernando Alonso						DNQ												
Arrow McLaren SP
2020	Dallara DW12	Chevrolet V6 t	F		TEX	IMS	ROA		IOW		INDY	GTW		MOH		IMS		STP				
2020	Dallara DW12	Chevrolet V6 t	F	(Mexico) Patricio O'Ward	12	8	8	**2***	4	12	6	3*	2	11	9	22	5	2				
2020	Dallara DW12	Chevrolet V6 t	F	(United States) Oliver Askew	9	26	15	21	3	6	30	14	17	19	15			16				
2020	Dallara DW12	Chevrolet V6 t	F	(Brazil) Hélio Castroneves												20	21					
2020	Dallara DW12	Chevrolet V6 t	F	(Spain) Fernando Alonso							21											
2021	Dallara DW12	Chevrolet V6 t	F		ALA	STP	TXS		IGP	INDY	DET		ROA	MOH	TOR	NSH	IND	GAT	POR	LAG	LBH	
2021	Dallara DW12	Chevrolet V6 t	F	(Mexico) Patricio O'Ward	**4**	19	3	1	15	4	**3**	1	9	8	13	**5**	2	14	5	27		
2021	Dallara DW12	Chevrolet V6 t	F	(Sweden) Felix Rosenqvist	21	12	13	16	17	27	25			23	8	13	16	6	19	13		
2021	Dallara DW12	Chevrolet V6 t	F	(United States) Oliver Askew								25										
2021	Dallara DW12	Chevrolet V6 t	F	(Denmark) Kevin Magnussen									24									
2021	Dallara DW12	Chevrolet V6 t	F	(Colombia) Juan Pablo Montoya					21	9												
2022	Dallara DW12	Chevrolet V6 t	F		STP	TXS	LBH	ALA	IMS	INDY	DET	ROA	MOH	TOR	IOW		IMS	NSH	GAT	POR	LAG	
2022	Dallara DW12	Chevrolet V6 t	F	(Mexico) Patricio O'Ward	12	15	5	1	19	2	5	26	**24**	11	2	1	12	24	4	4	8	
2022	Dallara DW12	Chevrolet V6 t	F	(Colombia) Juan Pablo Montoya					24	11												
2022	Dallara DW12	Chevrolet V6 t	F	(Sweden) Felix Rosenqvist	17	**21**	11	16	6	4	10	6	27	3	26	7	**9**	7	16	10	4	
Arrow McLaren
2023					STP	TXS	LBH	ALA	IMS	INDY	DET	ROA	MOH	TOR	IOW		NSH	IMS	GAT	POR	LAG	
2023	Dallara DW12	Chevrolet IndyCar V6 t	F	(Mexico) Pato O'Ward	2	2	17	4	2	24*	26	3	8	8	3	10	8	3	2	4	9	
2023	Dallara DW12	Chevrolet IndyCar V6 t	F	(Sweden) Felix Rosenqvist	19	**26**	7	9	5	27	3	20	25	10	13	4	22	27	8	2	**19**	
2023	Dallara DW12	Chevrolet IndyCar V6 t	F	(United States) Alexander Rossi	4	22	22	8	3	5	5	10	10	16	10	15	19	5	4	20	7	
2023	Dallara DW12	Chevrolet IndyCar V6 t	F	(Brazil) Tony Kanaan						16												
2024					STP	THE	LBH	ALA	IMS	INDY	DET	ROA	LAG	MOH	IOW		TOR	GAT	POR	MIL		NSH
2024	Dallara DW12	Chevrolet IndyCar V6 t	F	(Mexico) Pato O'Ward	1	DNQ	16	23	13	2	7	8	8	1	2	6	17	26	15	1*	24	2
2024	Dallara DW12	Chevrolet IndyCar V6 t	F	(United Kingdom) Callum Ilott	11	DNQ				11												
2024	Dallara DW12	Chevrolet IndyCar V6 t	F	(France) Théo Pourchaire			11	22	19		10	13										
2024	Dallara DW12	Chevrolet IndyCar V6 t	F	(United States) Nolan Siegel									12	20	12	14	18	7	21	17	25	18
2024	Dallara DW12	Chevrolet IndyCar V6 t	F	(United States) Alexander Rossi	6	7	10	25	8	4	5	18	3	6	8	15	Wth	19	12	7	6	15
2024	Dallara DW12	Chevrolet IndyCar V6 t	F	(United States) Kyle Larson						18												
2025					STP	THE	LBH	BAR	IGP	INDY	DET	GAT	ROA	MOH	IOW		TOR	LAG	POR	MIL	NSS	
2025	Dallara DW12	Chevrolet IndyCar V6 t	F	(Mexico) Pato O'Ward	11	**2**	13	6	2	3	7	2	17	5	1	5	1	4	25	5	**24**	
2025	Dallara DW12	Chevrolet IndyCar V6 t	F	(United States) Nolan Siegel	25	19	20	9	13	13	19	19	8	11	24	DNS	18	18	16	27	17	
2025	Dallara DW12	Chevrolet IndyCar V6 t	F	(Denmark) Christian Lundgaard	8	3	3	2	16	7	8	14	24	3	21	6	13	2	**2**	6	25	
2025	Dallara DW12	Chevrolet IndyCar V6 t	F	(United States) Kyle Larson^{3}						24												
					STP	PHX	ARL	ALA	LBH	IMS	INDY	DET	GAT	ROA	MOH	NSH	POR	MRK	WSH	MIL		LAG
2026	Dallara DW12	Chevrolet IndyCar V6 t	F	(Mexico) Pato O'Ward	5	4	5	17	5	18	4	4	11	12	1*	6						
2026	Dallara DW12	Chevrolet IndyCar V6 t	F	(United States) Nolan Siegel	20	20	24	18	12	10	11	15	24	21	10	11						
2026	Dallara DW12	Chevrolet IndyCar V6 t	F	(Denmark) Christian Lundgaard	3	13	7	2	20	1	17	5	10	1	**2**	16						
2026	Dallara DW12	Chevrolet IndyCar V6 t	F	(United States) Ryan Hunter-Reay							32											

1. In conjunction with Andretti Autosport.
2. In conjunction with Arrow Schmidt Peterson Motorsports.
3. In conjunction with Hendrick Motorsports

==== Race wins ====
#	Season	Date	Sanction	Track / Race	No.	Winning driver	Chassis	Engine	Tire	Grid	Laps Led
1	1973	26 August	USAC	Ontario 500 Qualification Heat 2 **(O)**	**7**	(United States) Johnny Rutherford	McLaren M16C	Offenhauser	Goodyear	**Pole**	21
2	1973	16 September	USAC	Michigan Speedway Twin 125s #2 **(O)**	**7**	(United States) Johnny Rutherford (2)	McLaren M16C	Offenhauser	Goodyear	2	49
3	1974	3 March	USAC	Ontario 500 Qualification Heat 2 **(O)**	**3**	(United States) Johnny Rutherford (3)	McLaren M16C	Offenhauser	Goodyear	**Pole**	4
4	1974	26 May	USAC	Indianapolis 500 **(O)**	**3**	(United States) Johnny Rutherford (4)	McLaren M16C	Offenhauser	Goodyear	25	122
5	1974	9 June	USAC	Milwaukee Mile **(O)**	**3**	(United States) Johnny Rutherford (5)	McLaren M16C	Offenhauser	Goodyear	2	58
6	1974	30 June	USAC	Pocono 500 **(O)**	**3**	(United States) Johnny Rutherford (6)	McLaren M16C	Offenhauser	Goodyear	25	122
7	1975	16 March	USAC	Phoenix International Raceway **(O)**	**2**	(United States) Johnny Rutherford (7)	McLaren M16C	Offenhauser	Goodyear	2	97
**NC**	1975	27 April	USAC	Trenton International Speedway **(O)**	**2**	(United States) Johnny Rutherford	McLaren M16C	Offenhauser	Goodyear	2	69
8	1976	2 May	USAC	Trenton International Speedway **(O)**	**2**	(United States) Johnny Rutherford (8)	McLaren M16C	Offenhauser	Goodyear	2	60
9	1976	30 May	USAC	Indianapolis 500 **(O)**	**2**	(United States) Johnny Rutherford (9)	McLaren M16E	Offenhauser	Goodyear	**Pole**	48
10	1976	31 October	USAC	Texas World Speedway **(O)**	**2**	(United States) Johnny Rutherford (10)	McLaren M16E	Offenhauser	Goodyear	6	9
11	1977	27 March	USAC	Phoenix International Raceway **(O)**	**2**	(United States) Johnny Rutherford (11)	McLaren M24	Cosworth DFX V8 t	Goodyear	**Pole**	51
12	1977	12 June	USAC	Milwaukee Mile **(O)**	**2**	(United States) Johnny Rutherford (12)	McLaren M24	Cosworth DFX V8t	Goodyear	2	103
13	1977	31 July	USAC	Texas World Speedway **(O)**	**2**	(United States) Johnny Rutherford (13)	McLaren M24	Cosworth DFX V8t	Goodyear	2	81
14	1977	21 August	USAC	Milwaukee Mile **(O)**	**2**	(United States) Johnny Rutherford (14)	McLaren M24	Cosworth DFX V8t	Goodyear	3	29
15	1978	16 July	USAC	Michigan International Speedway **(O)**	**4**	(United States) Johnny Rutherford (15)	McLaren M24B	Cosworth DFX V8t	Goodyear	2	53
16	1978	28 October	USAC	Phoenix International Raceway **(O)**	**4**	(United States) Johnny Rutherford (16)	McLaren M24B	Cosworth DFX V8t	Goodyear	3	67
17	1979	22 April	CART	Atlanta Motor Speedway Race 1 **(O)**	**4**	(United States) Johnny Rutherford (17)	McLaren M24B	Cosworth DFX V8t	Goodyear	**Pole**	30
18	1979	22 April	CART	Atlanta Motor Speedway Race 2 **(O)**	**4**	(United States) Johnny Rutherford (18)	McLaren M24B	Cosworth DFX V8t	Goodyear	**Pole**	61
19	2021	2 May	IndyCar	Texas Motor Speedway **(O)**	**5**	(Mexico) Patricio O'Ward	Dallara DW12	Chevrolet IndyCar V6 t	Firestone	4	25
20	2021	13 June	IndyCar	Belle Isle Street Circuit Race 2	**5**	(Mexico) Patricio O'Ward (2)	Dallara DW12	Chevrolet IndyCar V6t	Firestone	16	3
21	2022	1 May	IndyCar	Indy Grand Prix of Alabama	**5**	(Mexico) Patricio O'Ward (3)	Dallara DW12	Chevrolet IndyCar V6t	Firestone	2	27
22	2022	24 July	IndyCar	Iowa Speedway race 2 **(O)**	**5**	(Mexico) Patricio O'Ward (4)	Dallara DW12	Chevrolet IndyCar V6t	Firestone	7	66
23	2024	10 March	IndyCar	Firestone Grand Prix of St. Petersburg	**5**	(Mexico) Patricio O'Ward (5)	Dallara DW12	Chevrolet IndyCar V6t	Firestone	3	-
24	2024	7 July	IndyCar	Mid-Ohio Sports Car Course	**5**	(Mexico) Patricio O'Ward (6)	Dallara DW12	Chevrolet IndyCar V6t	Firestone	2	24
25	2024	31 August	IndyCar	Milwaukee Mile race 1 **(O)**	**5**	(Mexico) Patricio O'Ward (7)	Dallara DW12	Chevrolet IndyCar V6t	Firestone	6	133
26	2025	12 July	IndyCar	Iowa Speedway race 1 **(O)**	**5**	(Mexico) Patricio O'Ward (8)	Dallara DW12	Chevrolet IndyCar V6t	Firestone	5	33
27	2025	20 July	IndyCar	Exhibition Place	**5**	(Mexico) Patricio O'Ward (9)	Dallara DW12	Chevrolet IndyCar V6t	Firestone	10	30
28	2026	9 May	IndyCar	Grand Prix of Indianapolis	**7**	(Denmark) Christian Lundgaard	Dallara DW12	Chevrolet IndyCar V6 t	Firestone	4	20
29	2026	21 June	IndyCar	XPEL Grand Prix at Road America	**7**	(Denmark) Christian Lundgaard (2)	Dallara DW12	Chevrolet IndyCar V6 t	Firestone	16	7
30	2026	5 July	IndyCar	Honda Indy 200	5	(Mexico) Patricio O'Ward (10)	Dallara DW12	Chevrolet IndyCar V6 t	Firestone	2	45

=== Extreme E results ===
==== Racing overview ====
Year	Name	Car	Tyres	No.	G.	Drivers	Rounds	Pts.	Pos.
2022	(United Kingdom) McLaren XE / NEOM McLaren Extreme E Team	Spark Odyssey 21	C	58.	M	(United States) Tanner Foust	(1–5)	52	5th
2022	(United Kingdom) McLaren XE / NEOM McLaren Extreme E Team	Spark Odyssey 21	C	58.	F	(New Zealand) Emma Gilmour	(1–5)	52	5th
2023	(United Kingdom) NEOM McLaren Extreme E Team	Spark Odyssey 21	C	58.	M	(United States) Tanner Foust	(1–10)	68	8th
2023	(United Kingdom) NEOM McLaren Extreme E Team	Spark Odyssey 21	C	58.	F	(New Zealand) Emma Gilmour	(1–7)	68	8th
2023	(United Kingdom) NEOM McLaren Extreme E Team	Spark Odyssey 21	C	58.	F	(Italy) Tamara Molinaro	(7–8)	68	8th
2023	(United Kingdom) NEOM McLaren Extreme E Team	Spark Odyssey 21	C	58.	F	(Norway) Hedda Hosås	(9–10)	68	8th
2024	(United Kingdom) NEOM McLaren Extreme E Team	Spark Odyssey 21	C	58.	M	(Sweden) Mattias Ekström	(1–4)	46	5th
2024	(United Kingdom) NEOM McLaren Extreme E Team	Spark Odyssey 21	C	58.	F	(Spain) Cristina Gutiérrez	(1–4)	46	5th

==== Racing summary ====
Year	Series	Races	Wins	Pod.	B/Qual.	S/S	Pts.	Pos.
2022	Extreme E	5	0	1	0	1	52	5th
2023	Extreme E	10	0	1	0	0	68	8th
2024	Extreme E	4	0	1	0	0	46	5th
Total		19	0	3	0	1	166	–

==== Complete Extreme E results ====
(Races in bold indicate best qualifiers; races in italics indicate fastest super sector)

Year	Entrant	1	2	3	4	5	6	7	8	9	10	Pts.	Pos.
2022	McLaren XE / NEOM McLaren Extreme E Team	DES (Saudi Arabia); 5	ISL1 (Italy); 10	ISL2 (Italy); 6	COP (Chile); 5	ENE (Uruguay); 2						52	5th
2023	NEOM McLaren Extreme E Team	DES1 (Saudi Arabia); 6	DES2 (Saudi Arabia); 7	HYD1 (United Kingdom); 8	HYD2 (United Kingdom); 2	ISL-I1 (Italy); 7	ISL-I2 (Italy); 9	ISL-II1 (Italy); 10	ISL-II2 (Italy); DNS	COP1 (Chile); 4	COP2 (Chile); 5	68	8th
2024	NEOM McLaren Extreme E Team	DES1 (Saudi Arabia); 2	DES2 (Saudi Arabia); 5	HYD1 (United Kingdom); 8	HYD2 (United Kingdom); 5							46	5th

=== Formula E results ===
Year	Chassis	Powertrain	Tyres	No.	Drivers	1	2	3	4	5	6	7	8	9	10	11	12	13	14	15	16	Points	T.C.
NEOM McLaren Formula E Team
2022–23	Formula E Gen3	Nissan e-4ORCE 04	H			MEX	DRH		HYD	CAP	SAP	BER		MCO	JKT		POR	RME		LDN		88	8th
2022–23	Formula E Gen3	Nissan e-4ORCE 04	H	5	(United Kingdom) Jake Hughes	5	8	**5**	Ret	10	8	Ret	18	**5**	10	Ret	18	DNS	11	10	19	88	8th
2022–23	Formula E Gen3	Nissan e-4ORCE 04	H	58	(Germany) René Rast	Ret	5	3	Ret	4	9	17	13	17	15	15	14	Ret	13	14	12	88	8th
2023–24	Formula E Gen3	Nissan e-4ORCE 04	H			MEX	DRH		SAP	TKO	ITA		MCO	BER		SHA		POR		LDN		101	7th
2023–24	Formula E Gen3	Nissan e-4ORCE 04	H	5	(United Kingdom) Jake Hughes	7	11	4	Ret	14	13	**8**	16	15	12	16	**2**	21	Ret	Ret	10	101	7th
2023–24	Formula E Gen3	Nissan e-4ORCE 04	H	8	(United Kingdom) Sam Bird	14	4	Ret	1	19	Ret	10	WD			17	Ret	7	Ret	8	Ret	101	7th
2023–24	Formula E Gen3	Nissan e-4ORCE 04	H	8	(United Kingdom) Taylor Barnard								14	10	8							101	7th
2024–25	Formula E Gen3 Evo	Nissan e-4ORCE 04	H			SAP	MEX	JED		MIA	MCO		TKO		SHA		JAK	BER		LDN		143	6th
2024–25	Formula E Gen3 Evo	Nissan e-4ORCE 04	H	5	(United Kingdom) Taylor Barnard	3	14	3	**2**	20	**15**	16	3	Ret	3	10	7	4	6	13	Ret	143	6th
2024–25	Formula E Gen3 Evo	Nissan e-4ORCE 04	H	8	(United Kingdom) Sam Bird	4	18	8	12	18	11	20	14	8	7	15	8	11	Ret	NC	Ret	143	6th

== Notes ==
Sporting positions
Preceded by Lotus	Formula One Constructors' Champion; 1974	Succeeded by Ferrari
Preceded by Ferrari	Formula One Constructors' Champion; 1984–1985	Succeeded by Williams
Preceded by Williams	Formula One Constructors' Champion; 1988–1989–1990–1991	Succeeded by Williams
Preceded by Williams	Formula One Constructors' Champion; 1998	Succeeded by Ferrari
Preceded by Red Bull Racing	Formula One Constructors' Champion; 2024–2025	Succeeded by Mercedes
