= McLaren Grand Prix results =

The first table details World Championship Grand Prix results for the McLaren Formula One team. The second table includes results from privately owned McLaren cars in World Championship Grands Prix.

== Formula One results ==
=== Works team entries ===
==== 1960s ====
(key)

Year	Chassis	Engine	Tyres	Drivers	1	2	3	4	5	6	7	8	9	10	11	12	Points (Note: Up until 1978, not all points scored by a constructor contributed to their final World Championship tally (see list of points scoring systems for more information). Numbers without parentheses are Championship points; numbers in parentheses are total points scored.)	WCC
1966	M2B	Ford 406; 3.0 V8	F		MON	BEL	FRA	GBR	NED	GER	ITA	USA	MEX				2	9th (Note: 1966: McLaren-Ford 9th in the WCC (2 points); McLaren-Serenissima 12th in the WCC (1 point))
1966	M2B	Ford 406; 3.0 V8	F	(New Zealand) Bruce McLaren	Ret							5	Ret				2	9th
1966	M2B	Serenissima M166; 3.0 V8	F	(New Zealand) Bruce McLaren		DNS		6	DNS								1	12th
1967	M4B	BRM P111; 2.1 V8	G		RSA	MON	NED	BEL	FRA	GBR	GER	CAN	ITA	USA	MEX		3	10th
1967	M4B	BRM P111; 2.1 V8	G	(New Zealand) Bruce McLaren		4	Ret										3	10th
1967	M5A	BRM P101; 3.0 V12	G	(New Zealand) Bruce McLaren								7	Ret	Ret	Ret		3	10th
1968	M5A	BRM P101; 3.0 V12	G		RSA	ESP	MON	BEL	NED	FRA	GBR	GER	ITA	CAN	USA	MEX	3 (Note: Points total includes points scored by private entries.)	10th
1968	M5A	BRM P101; 3.0 V12	G	(New Zealand) Denny Hulme	5												3	10th
1968	M7A	Ford Cosworth DFV; 3.0 V8	G	(New Zealand) Denny Hulme		2	5	Ret	Ret	5	4	7	1	1	Ret	Ret	**49**	**2nd** (Note: 1968: McLaren-Ford 2nd in the WCC (49 points); McLaren-BRM 10th in the WCC (3 points))
1968	M7A	Ford Cosworth DFV; 3.0 V8	G	(New Zealand) Bruce McLaren		Ret	Ret	1	Ret	8	7	13	Ret	2	6	2	**49**	**2nd**
1969	M7A; M7B; M7C; M9A	Ford Cosworth DFV; 3.0 V8	G		RSA	ESP	MON	NED	FRA	GBR	GER	ITA	CAN	USA	MEX		38 (40)	5th
1969	M7A; M7B; M7C; M9A	Ford Cosworth DFV; 3.0 V8	G	(United Kingdom) Derek Bell						Ret							38 (40)	5th
1969	M7A; M7B; M7C; M9A	Ford Cosworth DFV; 3.0 V8	G	(New Zealand) Denny Hulme	3	4	6	4	8	Ret	Ret	7	Ret	Ret	1		38 (40)	5th
1969	M7A; M7B; M7C; M9A	Ford Cosworth DFV; 3.0 V8	G	(New Zealand) Bruce McLaren	5	2	5	Ret	4	3	3	4	5	DNS	DNS		38 (40)	5th

==== 1970s ====
(key)

Year	Chassis	Engine	Tyres	Drivers	1	2	3	4	5	6	7	8	9	10	11	12	13	14	15	16	17	Points	WCC
1970	M7D; M14A; M14D	Ford Cosworth DFV; 3.0	G		RSA	ESP	MON	BEL	NED	FRA	GBR	GER	AUT	ITA	CAN	USA	MEX					35	5th
1970	M7D; M14A; M14D	Ford Cosworth DFV; 3.0	G	(United Kingdom) Peter Gethin					Ret			Ret	10	Ret	6	14	Ret					35	5th
1970	M7D; M14A; M14D	Ford Cosworth DFV; 3.0	G	(United States) Dan Gurney					Ret	6	Ret											35	5th
1970	M7D; M14A; M14D	Ford Cosworth DFV; 3.0	G	(New Zealand) Denny Hulme	2	Ret	4			4	3	3	Ret	4	Ret	7	3					35	5th
1970	M7D; M14A; M14D	Ford Cosworth DFV; 3.0	G	(New Zealand) Bruce McLaren	Ret	2	Ret															35	5th
1970	M7D; M14D	Alfa Romeo T33; 3.0 V8	G	(Italy) Andrea de Adamich		DNQ	DNQ		DNQ	NC	DNS	DNQ	12	8	Ret	DNQ						0	—
1970	M7D; M14D	Alfa Romeo T33; 3.0 V8	G	(Italy) Nanni Galli										DNQ								0	—
1971	M14A; M19A	Ford Cosworth DFV; 3.0 V8	G		RSA	ESP	MON	NED	FRA	GBR	GER	AUT	ITA	CAN	USA							10	6th
1971	M14A; M19A	Ford Cosworth DFV; 3.0 V8	G	(United Kingdom) Peter Gethin	Ret	8	Ret	Ret	9	Ret	Ret											10	6th
1971	M14A; M19A	Ford Cosworth DFV; 3.0 V8	G	(New Zealand) Denny Hulme	6	5	4	12	Ret	Ret	Ret	Ret		4^{F}	Ret							10	6th
1971	M14A; M19A	Ford Cosworth DFV; 3.0 V8	G	(United Kingdom) Jackie Oliver						Ret		9	7									10	6th
1972	M19A; M19C	Ford Cosworth DFV; 3.0 V8	G		ARG	RSA	ESP	MON	BEL	FRA	GBR	GER	AUT	ITA	CAN	USA						**47 (49)**	**3rd**
1972	M19A; M19C	Ford Cosworth DFV; 3.0 V8	G	(New Zealand) Denny Hulme	2	1	Ret	15	3	7	5	Ret	2^{F}	3	3	3						**47 (49)**	**3rd**
1972	M19A; M19C	Ford Cosworth DFV; 3.0 V8	G	(United States) Peter Revson	Ret	3	5		7		3		3	4	2^{P}	18						**47 (49)**	**3rd**
1972	M19A; M19C	Ford Cosworth DFV; 3.0 V8	G	(United Kingdom) Brian Redman				5		9		5										**47 (49)**	**3rd**
1972	M19A; M19C	Ford Cosworth DFV; 3.0 V8	G	(South Africa) Jody Scheckter												9						**47 (49)**	**3rd**
1973	M19A; M19C; M23	Ford Cosworth DFV; 3.0 V8	G		ARG	BRA	RSA	ESP	BEL	MON	SWE	FRA	GBR	NED	GER	AUT	ITA	CAN	USA			**58**	**3rd**
1973	M19A; M19C; M23	Ford Cosworth DFV; 3.0 V8	G	(New Zealand) Denny Hulme	5	3^{F}	5^{P}	6	7	6	1^{F}	8^{F}	3	Ret	12	8	15	13	4			**58**	**3rd**
1973	M19A; M19C; M23	Ford Cosworth DFV; 3.0 V8	G	(Belgium) Jacky Ickx											3							**58**	**3rd**
1973	M19A; M19C; M23	Ford Cosworth DFV; 3.0 V8	G	(United States) Peter Revson	8	Ret	2	4	Ret	5	7		1	4	9	Ret	3	1	5			**58**	**3rd**
1973	M19A; M19C; M23	Ford Cosworth DFV; 3.0 V8	G	(South Africa) Jody Scheckter			9					Ret	Ret					Ret	Ret			**58**	**3rd**
1974	M23	Ford Cosworth DFV; 3.0 V8	G		ARG	BRA	RSA	ESP	BEL	MON	SWE	NED	FRA	GBR	GER	AUT	ITA	CAN	USA			**73 (75)**	**1st**
1974	M23	Ford Cosworth DFV; 3.0 V8	G	(Brazil) Emerson Fittipaldi	10	1^{P}	7	3	1	5	4	3	Ret	2	Ret	Ret	2	1^{P}	4			**73 (75)**	**1st**
1974	M23	Ford Cosworth DFV; 3.0 V8	G	(New Zealand) Denny Hulme	1	12	9	6	6^{F}	Ret	Ret	Ret	6	7	DSQ	2	6	6	Ret			**73 (75)**	**1st**
1974	M23	Ford Cosworth DFV; 3.0 V8	G	(United Kingdom) Mike Hailwood	4	5	3	9	7	Ret	Ret	4	7	Ret	15^{†}							**73 (75)**	**1st**
1974	M23	Ford Cosworth DFV; 3.0 V8	G	(United Kingdom) David Hobbs												7	9					**73 (75)**	**1st**
1974	M23	Ford Cosworth DFV; 3.0 V8	G	(Germany) Jochen Mass														16	7			**73 (75)**	**1st**
1975	M23	Ford Cosworth DFV; 3.0 V8	G		ARG	BRA	RSA	ESP	MON	BEL	SWE	NED	FRA	GBR	GER	AUT	ITA	USA				**53**	**3rd**
1975	M23	Ford Cosworth DFV; 3.0 V8	G	(Brazil) Emerson Fittipaldi	1	2	Ret	DNS	2	7	8	Ret	4	1	Ret	9	2	2^{F}				**53**	**3rd**
1975	M23	Ford Cosworth DFV; 3.0 V8	G	(Germany) Jochen Mass	14	3	6	1^{‡}	6	Ret	Ret	Ret	3^{F}	7	Ret	4^{‡}	Ret	3				**53**	**3rd**
1976	M23; M26	Ford Cosworth DFV; 3.0 V8	G		BRA	RSA	USW	ESP	BEL	MON	SWE	FRA	GBR	GER	AUT	NED	ITA	CAN	USA	JPN		**74 (75)**	**2nd**
1976	M23; M26	Ford Cosworth DFV; 3.0 V8	G	(United Kingdom) James Hunt	Ret^{P}	2^{P}	Ret	1^{P}	Ret	Ret	5	1^{P}	DSQ	1^{P}	4^{P}^{F}	1	Ret	1^{P}	1^{P}^{F}	3		**74 (75)**	**2nd**
1976	M23; M26	Ford Cosworth DFV; 3.0 V8	G	(Germany) Jochen Mass	6	3	5	Ret^{F}	6	5	11	15	Ret	3	7	9	Ret	5	4	Ret		**74 (75)**	**2nd**
1977	M23; M26	Ford Cosworth DFV; 3.0 V8	G		ARG	BRA	RSA	USW	ESP	MON	BEL	SWE	FRA	GBR	GER	AUT	NED	ITA	USA	CAN	JPN	**60**	**3rd**
1977	M23; M26	Ford Cosworth DFV; 3.0 V8	G	(Italy) Bruno Giacomelli														Ret				**60**	**3rd**
1977	M23; M26	Ford Cosworth DFV; 3.0 V8	G	(United Kingdom) James Hunt	Ret^{P}^{F}	2^{P}^{F}	4^{P}	7	Ret	Ret	7	12	3	1^{P}^{F}	Ret	Ret	Ret	Ret^{P}	1^{P}	Ret	1	**60**	**3rd**
1977	M23; M26	Ford Cosworth DFV; 3.0 V8	G	(Germany) Jochen Mass	Ret	Ret	5	Ret	4	4	Ret	2	9	4	Ret	6	Ret	4	Ret	3	Ret	**60**	**3rd**
1977	M23; M26	Ford Cosworth DFV; 3.0 V8	G	(Canada) Gilles Villeneuve										11								**60**	**3rd**
1978	M26	Ford Cosworth DFV; 3.0 V8	G		ARG	BRA	RSA	USW	MON	BEL	ESP	SWE	FRA	GBR	GER	AUT	NED	ITA	USA	CAN		15	8th
1978	M26	Ford Cosworth DFV; 3.0 V8	G	(Italy) Bruno Giacomelli						8			Ret	7			Ret	14				15	8th
1978	M26	Ford Cosworth DFV; 3.0 V8	G	(United Kingdom) James Hunt	4	Ret	Ret	Ret	Ret	Ret	6	8	3	Ret	DSQ	Ret	10	Ret	7	Ret		15	8th
1978	M26	Ford Cosworth DFV; 3.0 V8	G	(France) Patrick Tambay	6	Ret	Ret	12	7		Ret	4	9	6	Ret	Ret	9	5	6	8		15	8th
1979	M26; M28; M28B; M28C; M29	Ford Cosworth DFV; 3.0 V8	G		ARG	BRA	RSA	USW	ESP	BEL	MON	FRA	GBR	GER	AUT	NED	ITA	CAN	USA			15	7th
1979	M26; M28; M28B; M28C; M29	Ford Cosworth DFV; 3.0 V8	G	(France) Patrick Tambay	Ret	Ret	10	Ret	13	DNQ	DNQ	10	7	Ret	10	Ret	Ret	Ret	Ret			15	7th
1979	M26; M28; M28B; M28C; M29	Ford Cosworth DFV; 3.0 V8	G	(United Kingdom) John Watson	3	8	Ret	Ret	Ret	6	4	11	4	5	9	Ret	Ret	6	6			15	7th

==== 1980s ====
(key)

Year	Chassis	Engine	Tyres	Drivers	1	2	3	4	5	6	7	8	9	10	11	12	13	14	15	16	Points	WCC
1980	M29B; M29C; M30	Ford Cosworth DFV; 3.0 V8	G		ARG	BRA	RSA	USW	BEL	MON	FRA	GBR	GER	AUT	NED	ITA	CAN	USA			11	9th
1980	M29B; M29C; M30	Ford Cosworth DFV; 3.0 V8	G	(France) Alain Prost	6	5	DNS		Ret	Ret	Ret	6	11	7	6	7	Ret	DNS			11	9th
1980	M29B; M29C; M30	Ford Cosworth DFV; 3.0 V8	G	(United Kingdom) Stephen South				DNQ													11	9th
1980	M29B; M29C; M30	Ford Cosworth DFV; 3.0 V8	G	(United Kingdom) John Watson	Ret	11	11	4	Ret	DNQ	7	8	Ret	Ret	Ret	Ret	4	NC			11	9th
1981	M29F; MP4	Ford Cosworth DFV; 3.0 V8	MI		USW	BRA	ARG	SMR	BEL	MON	ESP	FRA	GBR	GER	AUT	NED	ITA	CAN	CPL		28	6th
1981	M29F; MP4	Ford Cosworth DFV; 3.0 V8	MI	(Italy) Andrea de Cesaris	Ret	Ret	11	6	Ret	Ret	Ret	11	Ret	Ret	8	DNS	7^{†}	Ret	12		28	6th
1981	M29F; MP4	Ford Cosworth DFV; 3.0 V8	MI	(United Kingdom) John Watson	Ret	8	Ret	10	7	Ret	3	2	1	6	6	Ret	Ret	2^{F}	7		28	6th
1982	MP4B	Ford Cosworth DFV; 3.0 V8	MI		RSA	BRA	USW	SMR	BEL	MON	DET	CAN	NED	GBR	FRA	GER	AUT	SUI	ITA	CPL	**69**	**2nd**
1982	MP4B	Ford Cosworth DFV; 3.0 V8	MI	(Austria) Niki Lauda	4	Ret	1^{F}		DSQ	Ret	Ret	Ret	4	1	8	DNS	5	3	Ret	Ret	**69**	**2nd**
1982	MP4B	Ford Cosworth DFV; 3.0 V8	MI	(United Kingdom) John Watson	6	2	6		1^{F}	Ret	1	3	9	Ret	Ret	Ret	9^{†}	13	4	2	**69**	**2nd**
1983	MP4/1C	Ford Cosworth DFV; 3.0 V8; Ford Cosworth DFY; 3.0 V8	MI		BRA	USW	FRA	SMR	MON	BEL	DET	CAN	GBR	GER	AUT	NED	ITA	EUR	RSA		34	5th
1983	MP4/1C	Ford Cosworth DFV; 3.0 V8; Ford Cosworth DFY; 3.0 V8	MI	(Austria) Niki Lauda	3	2^{F}	Ret	Ret	DNQ	Ret	Ret	Ret	6	DSQ	6						34	5th
1983	MP4/1C	Ford Cosworth DFV; 3.0 V8; Ford Cosworth DFY; 3.0 V8	MI	(United Kingdom) John Watson	Ret	1	Ret	5	DNQ	Ret	3^{F}	6	9	5	9	3					34	5th
1983	MP4/1E	TAG TTE PO1; 1.5 V6 t	MI	(Austria) Niki Lauda												Ret	Ret	Ret	11^{†}		0	—
1983	MP4/1E	TAG TTE PO1; 1.5 V6 t	MI	(United Kingdom) John Watson													Ret	Ret	DSQ		0	—
1984	MP4/2	TAG TTE PO1; 1.5 V6 t	MI		BRA	RSA	BEL	SMR	FRA	MON	CAN	DET	DAL	GBR	GER	AUT	NED	ITA	EUR	POR	**143.5**	**1st**
1984	MP4/2	TAG TTE PO1; 1.5 V6 t	MI	(Austria) Niki Lauda	Ret	1	Ret	Ret	1	Ret	2	Ret	Ret^{F}	1^{F}	2	1^{F}	2	1^{F}	4	2^{F}	**143.5**	**1st**
1984	MP4/2	TAG TTE PO1; 1.5 V6 t	MI	(France) Alain Prost	1^{F}	2	Ret	1	7^{F}	1^{P}^{‡}	3	4	Ret	Ret	1^{P}^{F}	Ret	1^{P}	Ret	1	1	**143.5**	**1st**
1985	MP4/2B	TAG TTE PO1; 1.5 V6 t	G		BRA	POR	SMR	MON	CAN	DET	FRA	GBR	GER	AUT	NED	ITA	BEL	EUR	RSA	AUS	**90**	**1st**
1985	MP4/2B	TAG TTE PO1; 1.5 V6 t	G	(Austria) Niki Lauda	Ret	Ret	4	Ret	Ret	Ret	Ret	Ret	5^{F}	Ret	1	Ret	DNS		Ret	Ret	**90**	**1st**
1985	MP4/2B	TAG TTE PO1; 1.5 V6 t	G	(United Kingdom) John Watson														7			**90**	**1st**
1985	MP4/2B	TAG TTE PO1; 1.5 V6 t	G	(France) Alain Prost	1^{F}	Ret	DSQ	1	3	Ret	3	1^{F}	2	1^{P}^{F}	2^{F}	1	3^{P}^{F}	4	3	Ret	**90**	**1st**
1986	MP4/2C	TAG TTE PO1; 1.5 V6 t	G		BRA	ESP	SMR	MON	BEL	CAN	DET	FRA	GBR	GER	HUN	AUT	ITA	POR	MEX	AUS	**96**	**2nd**
1986	MP4/2C	TAG TTE PO1; 1.5 V6 t	G	(France) Alain Prost	Ret	3	1	1^{P}^{F}	6^{F}	2	3	2	3	6^{†}	Ret	1	DSQ	2	2	1	**96**	**2nd**
1986	MP4/2C	TAG TTE PO1; 1.5 V6 t	G	(Finland) Keke Rosberg	Ret	4	5^{†}	2	Ret	4	Ret	4	Ret	5^{P}^{†}	Ret	9^{†}	4	Ret	Ret	Ret	**96**	**2nd**
1987	MP4/3	TAG TTE PO1; 1.5 V6 t	G		BRA	SMR	BEL	MON	DET	FRA	GBR	GER	HUN	AUT	ITA	POR	ESP	MEX	JPN	AUS	**76**	**2nd**
1987	MP4/3	TAG TTE PO1; 1.5 V6 t	G	(Sweden) Stefan Johansson	3	4	2	Ret	7	8	Ret	2	Ret	7	6	5	3	Ret	3	Ret	**76**	**2nd**
1987	MP4/3	TAG TTE PO1; 1.5 V6 t	G	(France) Alain Prost	1	Ret	1^{F}	9^{†}	3	3	Ret	7^{†}	3	6	15	1	2	Ret	7^{F}	Ret	**76**	**2nd**
1988	MP4/4	Honda RA168E; 1.5 V6 t	G		BRA	SMR	MON	MEX	CAN	DET	FRA	GBR	GER	HUN	BEL	ITA	POR	ESP	JPN	AUS	**199**	**1st**
1988	MP4/4	Honda RA168E; 1.5 V6 t	G	(France) Alain Prost	1	2^{F}	1	1^{F}	2	2^{F}	1^{P}^{F}	Ret	2	2^{F}	2	Ret	1^{P}	1^{F}	2	1^{F}	**199**	**1st**
1988	MP4/4	Honda RA168E; 1.5 V6 t	G	(Brazil) Ayrton Senna	DSQ^{P}	1^{P}	Ret^{P}^{F}	2^{P}	1^{P}^{F}	1^{P}	2	1	1^{P}	1^{P}	1^{P}	10^{P}^{†}	6	4^{P}	1^{P}^{F}	2^{P}	**199**	**1st**
1989	MP4/5	Honda RA109E; 3.5 V10	G		BRA	SMR	MON	MEX	USA	CAN	FRA	GBR	GER	HUN	BEL	ITA	POR	ESP	JPN	AUS	**141**	**1st**
1989	MP4/5	Honda RA109E; 3.5 V10	G	(France) Alain Prost	2	2^{F}	2^{F}	5	1	Ret^{P}	1^{P}	1	2	4	2^{F}	1^{F}	2	3	Ret^{F}	Ret	**141**	**1st**
1989	MP4/5	Honda RA109E; 3.5 V10	G	(Brazil) Ayrton Senna	11^{P}	1^{P}	1^{P}	1^{P}	Ret^{P}^{F}	7^{†}	Ret	Ret^{P}	1^{P}^{F}	2	1^{P}	Ret^{P}	Ret^{P}	1^{P}^{F}	DSQ^{P}	Ret^{P}	**141**	**1st**

==== 1990s ====
(key)

Year	Chassis	Engine	Tyres	Drivers	1	2	3	4	5	6	7	8	9	10	11	12	13	14	15	16	17	Points	WCC
1990	MP4/5B	Honda RA100E; 3.5 V10	G		USA	BRA	SMR	MON	CAN	MEX	FRA	GBR	GER	HUN	BEL	ITA	POR	ESP	JPN	AUS		**121**	**1st**
1990	MP4/5B	Honda RA100E; 3.5 V10	G	(Austria) Gerhard Berger	Ret^{P}^{F}	2^{F}	2	3	4^{F}	3^{P}	5	14^{†}	3	16^{†}	3	3	4	Ret	Ret	4		**121**	**1st**
1990	MP4/5B	Honda RA100E; 3.5 V10	G	(Brazil) Ayrton Senna	1	3^{P}	Ret^{P}	1^{P}^{F}	1^{P}	20^{†}	3	3	1^{P}	2	1^{P}	1^{P}^{F}	2	Ret^{P}	Ret^{P}	Ret^{P}		**121**	**1st**
1991	MP4/6	Honda RA121E; 3.5 V12	G		USA	BRA	SMR	MON	CAN	MEX	FRA	GBR	GER	HUN	BEL	ITA	POR	ESP	JPN	AUS		**139**	**1st**
1991	MP4/6	Honda RA121E; 3.5 V12	G	(Austria) Gerhard Berger	Ret	3	2^{F}	Ret	Ret	Ret	Ret	2	4	4	2	4	Ret	Ret^{P}	1^{P}	3^{F}^{‡}		**139**	**1st**
1991	MP4/6	Honda RA121E; 3.5 V12	G	(Brazil) Ayrton Senna	1^{P}	1^{P}	1^{P}	1^{P}	Ret	3	3	4^{†}	7^{†}	1^{P}	1^{P}	2^{P}^{F}	2	5	2^{F}	1^{P}^{‡}		**139**	**1st**
1992	MP4/6B; MP4/7A	Honda RA122E; 3.5 V12; Honda RA122E/B; 3.5 V12	G		RSA	MEX	BRA	ESP	SMR	MON	CAN	FRA	GBR	GER	HUN	BEL	ITA	POR	JPN	AUS		**99**	**2nd**
1992	MP4/6B; MP4/7A	Honda RA122E; 3.5 V12; Honda RA122E/B; 3.5 V12	G	(Austria) Gerhard Berger	5	4^{F}	Ret	4	Ret	Ret	1^{F}	Ret	5	Ret	3	Ret	4	2	2	1		**99**	**2nd**
1992	MP4/6B; MP4/7A	Honda RA122E; 3.5 V12; Honda RA122E/B; 3.5 V12	G	(Brazil) Ayrton Senna	3	Ret	Ret	9^{†}	3	1	Ret^{P}	Ret	Ret	2	1	5	1	3^{F}	Ret	Ret		**99**	**2nd**
1993	MP4/8	Ford HBE7; 3.5 V8; Ford HBA8; 3.5 V8	G		RSA	BRA	EUR	SMR	ESP	MON	CAN	FRA	GBR	GER	HUN	BEL	ITA	POR	JPN	AUS		**84**	**2nd**
1993	MP4/8	Ford HBE7; 3.5 V8; Ford HBA8; 3.5 V8	G	(United States) Michael Andretti	Ret	Ret	Ret	Ret	5	8	14	6	Ret	Ret	Ret	8	3					**84**	**2nd**
1993	MP4/8	Ford HBE7; 3.5 V8; Ford HBA8; 3.5 V8	G	(Finland) Mika Häkkinen														Ret	3	Ret		**84**	**2nd**
1993	MP4/8	Ford HBE7; 3.5 V8; Ford HBA8; 3.5 V8	G	(Brazil) Ayrton Senna	2	1	1^{F}	Ret	2	1	18^{†}	4	5^{†}	4	Ret	4	Ret	Ret	1	1^{P}		**84**	**2nd**
1994	MP4/9	Peugeot A6; 3.5 V10	G		BRA	PAC	SMR	MON	ESP	CAN	FRA	GBR	GER	HUN	BEL	ITA	POR	EUR	JPN	AUS		42	4th
1994	MP4/9	Peugeot A6; 3.5 V10	G	(United Kingdom) Martin Brundle	Ret	Ret	8	2	11^{†}	Ret	Ret	Ret	Ret	4^{†}	Ret	5	6	Ret	Ret	3		42	4th
1994	MP4/9	Peugeot A6; 3.5 V10	G	(Finland) Mika Häkkinen	Ret	Ret	3	Ret	Ret	Ret	Ret	3	Ret		2	3	3	3	7	12^{†}		42	4th
1994	MP4/9	Peugeot A6; 3.5 V10	G	(France) Philippe Alliot										Ret								42	4th
1995	MP4/10; MP4/10B; MP4/10C	Mercedes FO 110; 3.0 V10	G		BRA	ARG	SMR	ESP	MON	CAN	FRA	GBR	GER	HUN	BEL	ITA	POR	EUR	PAC	JPN	AUS	30	4th
1995	MP4/10; MP4/10B; MP4/10C	Mercedes FO 110; 3.0 V10	G	(United Kingdom) Mark Blundell	6	Ret			5	Ret	11	5	Ret	Ret	5	4	9	Ret	9	7	4	30	4th
1995	MP4/10; MP4/10B; MP4/10C	Mercedes FO 110; 3.0 V10	G	(United Kingdom) Nigel Mansell			10	Ret														30	4th
1995	MP4/10; MP4/10B; MP4/10C	Mercedes FO 110; 3.0 V10	G	(Finland) Mika Häkkinen	4	Ret	5	Ret	Ret	Ret	7	Ret	Ret	Ret	Ret	2	Ret	8		2	DNS	30	4th
1995	MP4/10; MP4/10B; MP4/10C	Mercedes FO 110; 3.0 V10	G	(Denmark) Jan Magnussen															10			30	4th
1996	MP4/11	Mercedes FO 110; 3.0 V10	G		AUS	BRA	ARG	EUR	SMR	MON	ESP	CAN	FRA	GBR	GER	HUN	BEL	ITA	POR	JPN		49	4th
1996	MP4/11	Mercedes FO 110; 3.0 V10	G	(United Kingdom) David Coulthard	Ret	Ret	7	3	Ret	2	Ret	4	6	5	5	Ret	Ret	Ret	13	8		49	4th
1996	MP4/11	Mercedes FO 110; 3.0 V10	G	(Finland) Mika Häkkinen	5	4	Ret	8	8^{†}	6^{†}	5	5	5	3	Ret	4	3	3	Ret	3		49	4th
1997	MP4/12	Mercedes FO110E; 3.0 V10; Mercedes FO110F; 3.0 V10	G		AUS	BRA	ARG	SMR	MON	ESP	CAN	FRA	GBR	GER	HUN	BEL	ITA	AUT	LUX	JPN	EUR	63	4th
1997	MP4/12	Mercedes FO110E; 3.0 V10; Mercedes FO110F; 3.0 V10	G	(United Kingdom) David Coulthard	1	10	Ret	Ret	Ret	6	7^{F}	7^{†}	4	Ret	Ret	Ret	1	2	Ret	10	2	63	4th
1997	MP4/12	Mercedes FO110E; 3.0 V10; Mercedes FO110F; 3.0 V10	G	(Finland) Mika Häkkinen	3	4	5	6	Ret	7	Ret	Ret	Ret	3	Ret	DSQ	9^{F}	Ret	Ret^{P}	4	1	63	4th
1998	MP4/13	Mercedes FO110G; 3.0 V10	B		AUS	BRA	ARG	SMR	ESP	MON	CAN	FRA	GBR	AUT	GER	HUN	BEL	ITA	LUX	JPN		**156**	**1st**
1998	MP4/13	Mercedes FO110G; 3.0 V10	B	(United Kingdom) David Coulthard	2	2	6^{P}	1^{P}	2	Ret	Ret^{P}	6^{F}	Ret	2^{F}	2^{F}	2	7	Ret	3	3		**156**	**1st**
1998	MP4/13	Mercedes FO110G; 3.0 V10	B	(Finland) Mika Häkkinen	1^{P}^{F}	1^{P}^{F}	2	Ret	1^{P}^{F}	1^{P}^{F}	Ret	3^{P}	2^{P}	1	1^{P}	6^{P}	Ret^{P}	4^{F}	1^{F}	1		**156**	**1st**
1999	MP4/14	Mercedes FO110H; 3.0 V10	B		AUS	BRA	SMR	MON	ESP	CAN	FRA	GBR	AUT	GER	HUN	BEL	ITA	EUR	MAL	JPN		**124**	**2nd**
1999	MP4/14	Mercedes FO110H; 3.0 V10	B	(United Kingdom) David Coulthard	Ret	Ret	2	Ret	2	7	Ret^{F}	1	2	5^{F}	2^{F}	1	5	Ret	Ret	Ret		**124**	**2nd**
1999	MP4/14	Mercedes FO110H; 3.0 V10	B	(Finland) Mika Häkkinen	Ret^{P}	1^{P}^{F}	Ret^{P}	3^{P}^{F}	1^{P}	1	2	Ret^{P}^{F}	3^{P}^{F}	Ret^{P}	1^{P}	2^{P}^{F}	Ret^{P}	5^{F}	3	1		**124**	**2nd**

==== 2000s ====
(key)

Year	Chassis	Engine	Tyres	Drivers	1	2	3	4	5	6	7	8	9	10	11	12	13	14	15	16	17	18	19	Points	WCC
2000	MP4/15	Mercedes FO110J; 3.0 V10	B		AUS	BRA	SMR	GBR	ESP	EUR	MON	CAN	FRA	AUT	GER	HUN	BEL	ITA	USA	JPN	MAL			**152**	**2nd**
2000	MP4/15	Mercedes FO110J; 3.0 V10	B	(United Kingdom) David Coulthard	Ret	DSQ	3	1	2	3^{P}	1	7	1^{F}	2^{F}	3^{P}	3	4	Ret	5^{F}	3	2			**152**	**2nd**
2000	MP4/15	Mercedes FO110J; 3.0 V10	B	(Finland) Mika Häkkinen	Ret^{P}	Ret^{P}	2^{P}^{F}	2^{F}	1^{F}	2	6^{F}	4^{F}	2	1^{P}	2	1^{F}	1^{P}	2^{F}	Ret	2^{F}	4^{F}			**152**	**2nd**
2001	MP4-16	Mercedes FO110K; 3.0 V10	B		AUS	MAL	BRA	SMR	ESP	AUT	MON	CAN	EUR	FRA	GBR	GER	HUN	BEL	ITA	USA	JPN			**102**	**2nd**
2001	MP4-16	Mercedes FO110K; 3.0 V10	B	(United Kingdom) David Coulthard	2	3	1	2^{P}	5	1^{F}	5^{P}^{F}	Ret	3	4^{F}	Ret	Ret	3	2	Ret	3	3			**102**	**2nd**
2001	MP4-16	Mercedes FO110K; 3.0 V10	B	(Finland) Mika Häkkinen	Ret	6^{F}	Ret	4	9^{†}	Ret	Ret	3	6	DNS	1^{F}	Ret	5^{F}	4	Ret	1	4			**102**	**2nd**
2002	MP4-17	Mercedes FO110M; 3.0 V10	MI		AUS	MAL	BRA	SMR	ESP	AUT	MON	CAN	EUR	GBR	FRA	GER	HUN	BEL	ITA	USA	JPN			**65**	**3rd**
2002	MP4-17	Mercedes FO110M; 3.0 V10	MI	(United Kingdom) David Coulthard	Ret	Ret	3	6	3	6	1	2	Ret	10	3^{F}	5	5	4	7	3	Ret			**65**	**3rd**
2002	MP4-17	Mercedes FO110M; 3.0 V10	MI	(Finland) Kimi Räikkönen	3^{F}	Ret	12^{†}	Ret	Ret	Ret	Ret	4	3	Ret	2	Ret	4	Ret	Ret	Ret	3			**65**	**3rd**
2003	MP4-17D	Mercedes FO110M; 3.0 V10; Mercedes FO110P; 3.0 V10	MI		AUS	MAL	BRA	SMR	ESP	AUT	MON	CAN	EUR	FRA	GBR	GER	HUN	ITA	USA	JPN				**142**	**3rd**
2003	MP4-17D	Mercedes FO110M; 3.0 V10; Mercedes FO110P; 3.0 V10	MI	(United Kingdom) David Coulthard	1	Ret	4	5	Ret	5	7	Ret	15^{†}	5	5	2	5	Ret	Ret	3				**142**	**3rd**
2003	MP4-17D	Mercedes FO110M; 3.0 V10; Mercedes FO110P; 3.0 V10	MI	(Finland) Kimi Räikkönen	3^{F}	1	2	2	Ret	2	2^{F}	6	Ret^{P}^{F}	4	3	Ret	2	4	2^{P}	2				**142**	**3rd**
2004	MP4-19; MP4-19B	Mercedes FO 110Q; 3.0 V10	MI		AUS	MAL	BHR	SMR	ESP	MON	EUR	CAN	USA	FRA	GBR	GER	HUN	BEL	ITA	CHN	JPN	BRA		69	5th
2004	MP4-19; MP4-19B	Mercedes FO 110Q; 3.0 V10	MI	(United Kingdom) David Coulthard	8	6	Ret	12	10	Ret	Ret	6	7	6	7	4	9	7	6	9	Ret	11		69	5th
2004	MP4-19; MP4-19B	Mercedes FO 110Q; 3.0 V10	MI	(Finland) Kimi Räikkönen	Ret	Ret	Ret	8	11	Ret	Ret	5	6	7	2^{P}	Ret^{F}	Ret	1^{F}	Ret	3	6	2		69	5th
2005	MP4-20	Mercedes FO 110R; 3.0 V10	MI		AUS	MAL	BHR	SMR	ESP	MON	EUR	CAN	USA	FRA	GBR	GER	HUN	TUR	ITA	BEL	BRA	JPN	CHN	**182**	**2nd**
2005	MP4-20	Mercedes FO 110R; 3.0 V10	MI	(Colombia) Juan Pablo Montoya	6	4			7	5	7	DSQ	DNS	Ret	1	2	Ret	3^{F}	1^{P}	14^{P}^{†}	1	Ret	Ret	**182**	**2nd**
2005	MP4-20	Mercedes FO 110R; 3.0 V10	MI	(Finland) Kimi Räikkönen	8	9^{F}	3	Ret^{P}	1^{P}	1^{P}	11^{†}	1^{F}	DNS	2^{F}	3^{F}	Ret^{P}^{F}	1^{F}	1^{P}	4^{F}	1	2^{F}	1^{F}	2^{F}	**182**	**2nd**
2005	MP4-20	Mercedes FO 110R; 3.0 V10	MI	(Spain) Pedro de la Rosa			5^{F}																	**182**	**2nd**
2005	MP4-20	Mercedes FO 110R; 3.0 V10	MI	(Austria) Alexander Wurz				3																**182**	**2nd**
2006	MP4-21	Mercedes FO 108S; 2.4 V8	MI		BHR	MAL	AUS	SMR	EUR	ESP	MON	GBR	CAN	USA	FRA	GER	HUN	TUR	ITA	CHN	JPN	BRA		**110**	**3rd**
2006	MP4-21	Mercedes FO 108S; 2.4 V8	MI	(Colombia) Juan Pablo Montoya	5	4	Ret	3	Ret	Ret	2	6	Ret	Ret										**110**	**3rd**
2006	MP4-21	Mercedes FO 108S; 2.4 V8	MI	(Finland) Kimi Räikkönen	3	Ret	2^{F}	5	4	5	Ret	3	3^{F}	Ret	5	3^{P}	Ret^{P}	Ret	2^{P}^{F}	Ret	5	5		**110**	**3rd**
2006	MP4-21	Mercedes FO 108S; 2.4 V8	MI	(Spain) Pedro de la Rosa											7	Ret	2	5	Ret	5	11	8		**110**	**3rd**
2007	MP4-22	Mercedes FO 108T; 2.4 V8	B		AUS	MAL	BHR	ESP	MON	CAN	USA	FRA	GBR	EUR	HUN	TUR	ITA	BEL	JPN	CHN	BRA			**0**	Ex. (Note: The World Motorsport Council disqualified McLaren from the 2007 Constructors' Championship as punishment for the 2007 Formula One espionage controversy. McLaren was stripped of its Constructors' Championship points, and Formula One's website states that the team scored zero points in 2007. At the time McLaren was disqualified (prior to the 2007 Belgian Grand Prix, with four rounds left in the season), McLaren led the Constructors' Championship with 166 points to Ferrari's 143. The two McLaren drivers were not disqualified from the Drivers' Championship, and they collectively scored 218 points. However, earlier in the season, McLaren had received a 15-point deduction due to a separate controversy at the 2007 Hungarian Grand Prix. As such, in the purely hypothetical circumstance that McLaren (1) was not disqualified from the Constructors' Championship, (2) recorded the exact same results that it did in real life, (3) lost its appeal of the Hungary deduction, and (4) did not receive a second points penalty in lieu of the season disqualification, McLaren would have scored 203 points, one point behind Ferrari.)
2007	MP4-22	Mercedes FO 108T; 2.4 V8	B	(Spain) Fernando Alonso	2	1	5	3	1^{P}^{F}	7^{F}	2	7	2	1	4 (Note: McLaren did not receive points for the Constructors' Championship at the 2007 Hungarian Grand Prix.)	3	1^{P}^{F}	3	Ret	2	3			**0**	Ex.
2007	MP4-22	Mercedes FO 108T; 2.4 V8	B	(United Kingdom) Lewis Hamilton	3	2^{F}	2	2	2	1^{P}	1^{P}	3	3^{P}	9	1^{P}	5	2	4	1^{P}^{F}	Ret^{P}	7			**0**	Ex.
2008	MP4-23	Mercedes FO 108V; 2.4 V8	B		AUS	MAL	BHR	ESP	TUR	MON	CAN	FRA	GBR	GER	HUN	EUR	BEL	ITA	SIN	JPN	CHN	BRA		**151**	**2nd**
2008	MP4-23	Mercedes FO 108V; 2.4 V8	B	(United Kingdom) Lewis Hamilton	1^{P}	5	13	3	2	1	Ret^{P}	10	1	1^{P}	5^{P}	2	3^{P}	7	3	12^{P}	1^{P}^{F}	5		**151**	**2nd**
2008	MP4-23	Mercedes FO 108V; 2.4 V8	B	(Finland) Heikki Kovalainen	5^{F}	3	5^{F}	Ret	12	8	9	4	5^{P}	5	1	4	10^{†}	2	10	Ret	Ret	7		**151**	**2nd**
2009	MP4-24	Mercedes FO 108W; 2.4 V8	B		AUS	MAL	CHN	BHR	ESP	MON	TUR	GBR	GER	HUN	EUR	BEL	ITA	SIN	JPN	BRA	ABU			**71**	**3rd**
2009	MP4-24	Mercedes FO 108W; 2.4 V8	B	(United Kingdom) Lewis Hamilton	DSQ	7^{‡}	6	4	9	12	13	16	18	1	2^{P}	Ret	12^{P}^{†}	1^{P}	3	3	Ret^{P}			**71**	**3rd**
2009	MP4-24	Mercedes FO 108W; 2.4 V8	B	(Finland) Heikki Kovalainen	Ret	Ret	5	12	Ret	Ret	14	Ret	8	5	4	6	6	7	11	12	11			**71**	**3rd**

==== 2010s ====
(key)

Year	Chassis	Engine	Tyres	Drivers	1	2	3	4	5	6	7	8	9	10	11	12	13	14	15	16	17	18	19	20	21	Points	WCC
2010	MP4-25	Mercedes FO 108X; 2.4 V8	B		BHR	AUS	MAL	CHN	ESP	MON	TUR	CAN	EUR	GBR	GER	HUN	BEL	ITA	SIN	JPN	KOR	BRA	ABU			**454**	**2nd**
2010	MP4-25	Mercedes FO 108X; 2.4 V8	B	(United Kingdom) Jenson Button	7	1	8	1	5	Ret	2	2	3^{F}	4	5	8	Ret	2	4	4	12	5	3			**454**	**2nd**
2010	MP4-25	Mercedes FO 108X; 2.4 V8	B	(United Kingdom) Lewis Hamilton	3	6	6	2^{F}	14^{F}^{†}	5	1	1^{P}	2	2	4	Ret	1^{F}	Ret	Ret	5	2	4^{F}	2^{F}			**454**	**2nd**
2011	MP4-26	Mercedes FO 108Y; 2.4 V8	P		AUS	MAL	CHN	TUR	ESP	MON	CAN	EUR	GBR	GER	HUN	BEL	ITA	SIN	JPN	KOR	IND	ABU	BRA			**497**	**2nd**
2011	MP4-26	Mercedes FO 108Y; 2.4 V8	P	(United Kingdom) Jenson Button	6	2	4	6	3	3	1^{F}	6	Ret	Ret	1	3	2	2^{F}	1^{F}	4	2	3	3			**497**	**2nd**
2011	MP4-26	Mercedes FO 108Y; 2.4 V8	P	(United Kingdom) Lewis Hamilton	2	8	1	4	2^{F}	6	Ret	4	4	1^{F}	4	Ret	4^{F}	5	5	2^{P}	7	1	Ret			**497**	**2nd**
2012	MP4-27	Mercedes FO 108Z; 2.4 V8	P		AUS	MAL	CHN	BHR	ESP	MON	CAN	EUR	GBR	GER	HUN	BEL	ITA	SIN	JPN	KOR	IND	ABU	USA	BRA		**378**	**3rd**
2012	MP4-27	Mercedes FO 108Z; 2.4 V8	P	(United Kingdom) Jenson Button	1^{F}	14	2	18^{†}	9	16^{†}	16	8	10	2	6	1^{P}	Ret	2	4	Ret	5^{F}	4	5	1		**378**	**3rd**
2012	MP4-27	Mercedes FO 108Z; 2.4 V8	P	(United Kingdom) Lewis Hamilton	3^{P}	3^{P}	3	8	8	5	1	19^{†}	8	Ret	1^{P}	Ret	1^{P}	Ret^{P}	5	10	4	Ret^{P}	1	Ret^{P}^{F}		**378**	**3rd**
2013	MP4-28	Mercedes FO 108F; 2.4 V8	P		AUS	MAL	CHN	BHR	ESP	MON	CAN	GBR	GER	HUN	BEL	ITA	SIN	KOR	JPN	IND	ABU	USA	BRA			122	5th
2013	MP4-28	Mercedes FO 108F; 2.4 V8	P	(United Kingdom) Jenson Button	9	17^{†}	5	10	8	6	12	13	6	7	6	10	7	8	9	14	12	10	4			122	5th
2013	MP4-28	Mercedes FO 108F; 2.4 V8	P	(Mexico) Sergio Pérez	11	9^{F}	11	6	9	16^{†}	11	20^{†}	8	9	11	12	8	10	15	5	9	7	6			122	5th
2014	MP4-29	Mercedes PU106A Hybrid; 1.6 V6 t	P		AUS	MAL	BHR	CHN	ESP	MON	CAN	AUT	GBR	GER	HUN	BEL	ITA	SIN	JPN	RUS	USA	BRA	ABU			181	5th
2014	MP4-29	Mercedes PU106A Hybrid; 1.6 V6 t	P	(United Kingdom) Jenson Button	3	6	17^{†}	11	11	6	4	11	4	8	10	6	8	Ret	5	4	12	4	5			181	5th
2014	MP4-29	Mercedes PU106A Hybrid; 1.6 V6 t	P	(Denmark) Kevin Magnussen	2	9	Ret	13	12	10	9	7	7	9	12	12	10	10	14	5	8	9	11			181	5th
2015	MP4-30	Honda RA615H; 1.6 V6 t	P		AUS	MAL	CHN	BHR	ESP	MON	CAN	AUT	GBR	HUN	BEL	ITA	SIN	JPN	RUS	USA	MEX	BRA	ABU			27	9th
2015	MP4-30	Honda RA615H; 1.6 V6 t	P	(Spain) Fernando Alonso		Ret	12	11	Ret	Ret	Ret	Ret	10	5	13	18^{†}	Ret	11	11	11	Ret	15	17			27	9th
2015	MP4-30	Honda RA615H; 1.6 V6 t	P	(United Kingdom) Jenson Button	11	Ret	14	DNS	16	8	Ret	Ret	Ret	9	14	14	Ret	16	9	6	14	14	12			27	9th
2015	MP4-30	Honda RA615H; 1.6 V6 t	P	(Denmark) Kevin Magnussen	DNS																					27	9th
2016	MP4-31	Honda RA616H; 1.6 V6 t	P		AUS	BHR	CHN	RUS	ESP	MON	CAN	EUR	AUT	GBR	HUN	GER	BEL	ITA	SIN	MAL	JPN	USA	MEX	BRA	ABU	76	6th
2016	MP4-31	Honda RA616H; 1.6 V6 t	P	(Spain) Fernando Alonso	Ret		12	6	Ret	5	11	Ret	18^{†}	13	7	12	7	14^{F}	7	7	16	5	13	10	10	76	6th
2016	MP4-31	Honda RA616H; 1.6 V6 t	P	(United Kingdom) Jenson Button	14	Ret	13	10	9	9	Ret	11	6	12	Ret	8	Ret	12	Ret	9	18	9	12	16	Ret	76	6th
2016	MP4-31	Honda RA616H; 1.6 V6 t	P	(Belgium) Stoffel Vandoorne		10																				76	6th
2017	MCL32	Honda RA617H; 1.6 V6 t	P		AUS	CHN	BHR	RUS	ESP	MON	CAN	AZE	AUT	GBR	HUN	BEL	ITA	SIN	MAL	JPN	USA	MEX	BRA	ABU		30	9th
2017	MCL32	Honda RA617H; 1.6 V6 t	P	(Spain) Fernando Alonso	Ret	Ret	14^{†}	DNS	12		16^{†}	9	Ret	Ret	6^{F}	Ret	17^{†}	Ret	11	11	Ret	10	8	9		30	9th
2017	MCL32	Honda RA617H; 1.6 V6 t	P	(Belgium) Stoffel Vandoorne	13	Ret	DNS	14	Ret	Ret	14	12	12	11	10	14	Ret	7	7	14	12	12	Ret	12		30	9th
2017	MCL32	Honda RA617H; 1.6 V6 t	P	(United Kingdom) Jenson Button						Ret																30	9th
2018	MCL33	Renault R.E.18; 1.6 V6 t	P		AUS	BHR	CHN	AZE	ESP	MON	CAN	FRA	AUT	GBR	GER	HUN	BEL	ITA	SIN	RUS	JPN	USA	MEX	BRA	ABU	62	6th
2018	MCL33	Renault R.E.18; 1.6 V6 t	P	(Spain) Fernando Alonso	5	7	7	7	8	Ret	Ret	16^{†}	8	8	16^{†}	8	Ret	Ret	7	14	14	Ret	Ret	17	11	62	6th
2018	MCL33	Renault R.E.18; 1.6 V6 t	P	(Belgium) Stoffel Vandoorne	9	8	13	9	Ret	14	16	12	15^{†}	11	13	Ret	15	12	12	16	15	11	8	15	14	62	6th
2019	MCL34	Renault E-Tech 19; 1.6 V6 t	P		AUS	BHR	CHN	AZE	ESP	MON	CAN	FRA	AUT	GBR	GER	HUN	BEL	ITA	SIN	RUS	JPN	MEX	USA	BRA	ABU	145	4th
2019	MCL34	Renault E-Tech 19; 1.6 V6 t	P	(United Kingdom) Lando Norris	12	6	18^{†}	8	Ret	11	Ret	9	6	11	Ret	9	11^{†}	10	7	8	11	Ret	7	8	8	145	4th
2019	MCL34	Renault E-Tech 19; 1.6 V6 t	P	(Spain) Carlos Sainz Jr.	Ret	19^{†}	14	7	8	6	11	6	8	6	5	5	Ret	Ret	12	6	5	13	8	3	10	145	4th

==== 2020s ====
Key

Key
Colour	Result
Gold	Winner
Silver	Second place
Bronze	Third place
Green	Other points position
Blue	Other classified position
Blue	Not classified, finished (NC)
Purple	Not classified, retired (Ret)
Red	Did not qualify (DNQ)
Black	Disqualified (DSQ)
White	Did not start (DNS)
White	Race cancelled (C)
Blank	Did not practice (DNP)
Blank	Excluded (EX)
Blank	Did not arrive (DNA)
Blank	Withdrawn (WD)
Blank	Did not enter (empty cell)
Annotation	Meaning
P	Pole position
F	Fastest lap
Superscript number	Points-scoring position in sprint

Year	Chassis	Power unit	Tyres	Drivers	Grands Prix																								Points	WCC
2020	MCL35	Renault; E-Tech 20; 1.6 V6 t	P		AUT	STY	HUN	GBR	70A	ESP	BEL	ITA	TUS	RUS	EIF	POR	EMI	TUR	BHR	SKH	ABU								202	3rd
2020	MCL35	Renault; E-Tech 20; 1.6 V6 t	P	(United Kingdom) Lando Norris	3^{F}	5	13	5	9	10	7	4	6	15	Ret	13	8	8^{F}	4	10	5								202	3rd
2020	MCL35	Renault; E-Tech 20; 1.6 V6 t	P	(Spain) Carlos Sainz Jr.	5	9^{F}	9	13	13	6	DNS	2	Ret	Ret	5	6	7	5	5	4	6								202	3rd
2021	MCL35M	Mercedes-AMG; F1 M12 E Performance; 1.6 V6 t	P		BHR	EMI	POR	ESP	MON	AZE	FRA	STY	AUT	GBR	HUN	BEL	NED	ITA	RUS	TUR	USA	MXC	SAP	QAT	SAU	ABU			275	4th
2021	MCL35M	Mercedes-AMG; F1 M12 E Performance; 1.6 V6 t	P	(United Kingdom) Lando Norris	4	3	5	8	3	5	5	5	3	4	Ret	14	10	2	7^{P}^{F}	7	8	10	10	9	10	7			275	4th
2021	MCL35M	Mercedes-AMG; F1 M12 E Performance; 1.6 V6 t	P	(Australia) Daniel Ricciardo	7	6	9	6	12	9	6	13	7	5	11	4^{‡}	11	1^{F 3}	4	13	5	12	Ret	12	5	12			275	4th
2022	MCL36	Mercedes-AMG; F1 M13 E Performance; 1.6 V6 t	P		BHR	SAU	AUS	EMI	MIA	ESP	MON	AZE	CAN	GBR	AUT	FRA	HUN	BEL	NED	ITA	SIN	JPN	USA	MXC	SAP	ABU			159	5th
2022	MCL36	Mercedes-AMG; F1 M13 E Performance; 1.6 V6 t	P	(United Kingdom) Lando Norris	15	7	5	3^{5}	Ret	8	6^{F}	9	15	6	7	7	7	12	7	7	4	10	6	9	Ret^{7}	6^{F}			159	5th
2022	MCL36	Mercedes-AMG; F1 M13 E Performance; 1.6 V6 t	P	(Australia) Daniel Ricciardo	14	Ret	6	18^{6}	13	12	13	8	11	13	9	9	15	15	17	Ret	5	11	16	7	Ret	9			159	5th
2023	MCL60	Mercedes-AMG; F1 M14 E Performance; 1.6 V6 t	P		BHR	SAU	AUS	AZE	MIA	MON	ESP	CAN	AUT	GBR	HUN	BEL	NED	ITA	SIN	JPN	QAT	USA	MXC	SAP	LVG	ABU			302	4th
2023	MCL60	Mercedes-AMG; F1 M14 E Performance; 1.6 V6 t	P	(United Kingdom) Lando Norris	17	17	6	9	17	9	17	13	4	2	2	7^{6}	7	8	2	2	3^{3}	2^{4}	5	2^{2 F}	Ret	5			302	4th
2023	MCL60	Mercedes-AMG; F1 M14 E Performance; 1.6 V6 t	P	(Australia) Oscar Piastri	Ret	15	8	11	19	10	13	11	16	4	5	Ret^{2}	9	12^{F}	7	3	2^{1}	Ret	8	14	10^{F}	6			302	4th
2024	MCL38	Mercedes-AMG; F1 M15 E Performance; 1.6 V6 t	P		BHR	SAU	AUS	JPN	CHN	MIA	EMI	MON	CAN	ESP	AUT	GBR	HUN	BEL	NED	ITA	AZE	SIN	USA	MXC	SAP	LVG	QAT	ABU	666	1st
2024	MCL38	Mercedes-AMG; F1 M15 E Performance; 1.6 V6 t	P	(United Kingdom) Lando Norris	6	8	3	5	2^{6}	1	2	4	2	2^{P}^{F}	20†^{3}	3	2^{P}	5	1^{P}^{F}	3^{P}^{F}	4^{F}	1^{P}	4^{3 P}	2	6^{1 P}	6^{F}	10^{2 F}	1^{P}	666	1st
2024	MCL38	Mercedes-AMG; F1 M15 E Performance; 1.6 V6 t	P	(Australia) Oscar Piastri	8	4	4	8	8^{7}	13^{6 F}	4	2	5	7	2^{2}	4	1	2	4	2	1	3	5	8	8^{2}	7	3^{1}	10	666	1st
2025	MCL39	Mercedes-AMG; F1 M16 E Performance; 1.6 V6 t	P		AUS	CHN	JPN	BHR	SAU	MIA	EMI	MON	ESP	CAN	AUT	GBR	BEL	HUN	NED	ITA	AZE	SIN	USA	MXC	SAP	LVG	QAT	ABU	833	1st
2025	MCL39	Mercedes-AMG; F1 M16 E Performance; 1.6 V6 t	P	(United Kingdom) Lando Norris	1^{P}^{F}	2^{8 F}	2	3	4^{F}	2^{1 F}	2	1^{P}^{F}	2	18†	1^{P}	1	2^{3 P}	1	18†	2^{F}	7	3	2	1^{P}	1^{1 P}	DSQ^{P}	4^{3}	3	833	1st
2025	MCL39	Mercedes-AMG; F1 M16 E Performance; 1.6 V6 t	P	(Australia) Oscar Piastri	9	1^{2 P}	3	1^{P}^{F}	1	1^{2}	3^{P}	3	1^{P}^{F}	4	2^{F}	2^{F}	1^{2}	2	1^{P}^{F}	3	Ret	4	5	5	5	DSQ	2^{1 P F}	2	833	1st
2026	MCL40	Mercedes 1.6 V6 t	P		AUS	CHN	JPN	MIA	CAN	MON	BCN	AUT	GBR	BEL	HUN	NED	ITA	ESP	AZE	BHR	SIN	USA	MXC	SAP	LVG	QAT	ABU		263*	3rd*
2026	MCL40	Mercedes 1.6 V6 t	P	(United Kingdom) Lando Norris	5	DNS^{4}	5	2^{1 F}	Ret^{2}	Ret	3	7	4^{3}	7^{F}	1^{P}	1^{3 P}													263*	3rd*
2026	MCL40	Mercedes 1.6 V6 t	P	(Australia) Oscar Piastri	DNS	DNS^{6}	2	3^{2}	11^{4}	5	5	4	11^{7}	5	Ret	6^{5}													263*	3rd*

Notes

- * – Season still in progress.-->
- ^{†} – The driver did not finish the Grand Prix, but was classified, as he completed over 90% of the race distance.
- ^{‡} – Half points awarded as less than 75% of the race distance was completed.

=== Customer cars ===
(key) (results in bold indicate pole position; results in italics indicate fastest lap)

Year	Entrant	Chassis	Engine	Tyres	Driver	1	2	3	4	5	6	7	8	9	10	11	12	13	14	15	16	17
1966						MON	BEL	FRA	GBR	NED	GER	ITA	USA	MEX								
1966	Phil Hill	M3A	Ford 406; 3.0 V8	F	(United States) Phil Hill		Ret															
1968						RSA	ESP	MON	BEL	NED	FRA	GBR	GER	ITA	CAN	USA	MEX					
1968	Joakim Bonnier Racing Team	M5A	BRM P101; 3.0 V12	G	(Sweden) Joakim Bonnier			DNQ	Ret	8		Ret		6	Ret	NC	DNS					
1968	Anglo American Racers	M7A	Ford Cosworth DFV; 3.0 V8	G	(United States) Dan Gurney										Ret	4	Ret					
1969						RSA	ESP	MON	NED	FRA	GBR	GER	ITA	CAN	USA	MEX						
1969	Team Lawson	M7A	Ford Cosworth DFV; 3.0 V8	D	(South Africa) Basil van Rooyen	Ret																
1969	Antique Automobiles	M7B	Ford Cosworth DFV; 3.0 V8	G	(United Kingdom) Vic Elford				10	5	6	Ret										
1970						RSA	ESP	MON	BEL	NED	FRA	GBR	GER	AUT	ITA	CAN	USA	MEX				
1970	Team Surtees	M7C	Ford Cosworth DFV; 3.0 V8	F	(United Kingdom) John Surtees	Ret	Ret	Ret		6												
1970	Ecurie Bonnier	M7C	Ford Cosworth DFV; 3.0 V8	G	(Sweden) Joakim Bonnier										DNQ		Ret					
1971						RSA	ESP	MON	NED	FRA	GBR	GER	AUT	ITA	CAN	USA						
1971	Ecurie Bonnier	M7C	Ford Cosworth DFV; 3.0 V8	G	(Sweden) Joakim Bonnier	Ret						DNQ	DNS	10		16						
1971	Ecurie Bonnier	M7C	Ford Cosworth DFV; 3.0 V8	G	(Austria) Helmut Marko							DNS										
1971	Penske-White Racing	M19A	Ford Cosworth DFV; 3.0 V8	G	(United States) Mark Donohue										3	DNS						
1971	Penske-White Racing	M19A	Ford Cosworth DFV; 3.0 V8	G	(United Kingdom) David Hobbs											10						
1974						ARG	BRA	RSA	ESP	BEL	MON	SWE	NED	FRA	GBR	GER	AUT	ITA	CAN	USA		
1974	Scribante Lucky Strike Racing	M23	Ford Cosworth DFV; 3.0 V8	G	(South Africa) Dave Charlton			19														
1975						ARG	BRA	RSA	ESP	MON	BEL	SWE	NED	FRA	GBR	GER	AUT	ITA	USA			
1975	Lucky Strike Racing	M23	Ford Cosworth DFV; 3.0 V8	G	(South Africa) Dave Charlton			14														
1977						ARG	BRA	RSA	USW	ESP	MON	BEL	SWE	FRA	GBR	GER	AUT	NED	ITA	USA	CAN	JPN
1977	Iberia Airlines	M23	Ford Cosworth DFV; 3.0 V8	G	(Spain) Emilio de Villota					13		DNQ	DNQ		DNQ	DNQ	17		DNQ			
1977	Chesterfield Racing	M23	Ford Cosworth DFV; 3.0 V8	G	(United States) Brett Lunger							DNS	11	DNQ	13	Ret	10	9	Ret	10	11	
1978						ARG	BRA	RSA	USW	MON	BEL	ESP	SWE	FRA	GBR	GER	AUT	NED	ITA	USA	CAN	
1978	BS Fabrications; Liggett Group/BS Fabrications	M23; M26	Ford Cosworth DFV; 3.0 V8	G	(United States) Brett Lunger	13	Ret	11	DNQ	DNPQ	7	DNQ	DNQ	Ret	8	DNPQ	8	Ret	Ret			
1978	BS Fabrications; Liggett Group/BS Fabrications	M23; M26	Ford Cosworth DFV; 3.0 V8	G	(Brazil) Nelson Piquet												Ret	Ret	9			
1978	Centro Aseguredor F1	M25/M23 (Note: De Villota originally entered a McLaren M25 in the Spanish Grand Prix, but reverted to the M23 after the M25 got damaged in a practice crash)	Ford Cosworth DFV; 3.0 V8	G	(Spain) Emilio de Villota							DNQ										
1978	Melchester Racing	M23	Ford Cosworth DFV; 3.0 V8	G	(United Kingdom) Tony Trimmer										DNQ							

=== Non-championship results ===
(key) (results in bold indicate pole position; results in italics indicate fastest lap)

Year	Chassis	Engine	Driver	1	2	3	4	5	6	7	8
1967	M4B	BRM P111; 2.1 V8		ROC	SPC	INT	SYR	OUL	ESP		
1967	M4B	BRM P111; 2.1 V8	(New Zealand) Bruce McLaren	Ret	5	5					
1967	M4A	Ford Cosworth FVA; 1.6 L4	(United Kingdom) Alan Rollinson					9	Ret		
1968	M7A	Ford Cosworth DFV; 3.0 V8		ROC	INT	OUL					
1968	M7A	Ford Cosworth DFV; 3.0 V8	(New Zealand) Bruce McLaren	1^{P}^{F}	2						
1968	M7A	Ford Cosworth DFV; 3.0 V8	(New Zealand) Denny Hulme	3	1						
1968	M5A	BRM P101; 3.0 V12	(Sweden) Joakim Bonnier	Ret	Ret	Ret					
1968	M2A	Climax; V8	(United Kingdom) Keith St. John		WD						
1968	M2A	Climax; V8	(United Kingdom) Trevor Taylor		WD						
1969	M7A	Ford Cosworth DFV; 3.0 V8		ROC	INT	MAD	OUL				
1969	M7A	Ford Cosworth DFV; 3.0 V8	(New Zealand) Denny Hulme	3	Ret						
1969	M7B	Ford Cosworth DFV; 3.0 V8	(New Zealand) Bruce McLaren	Ret							
1969	M7C	Ford Cosworth DFV; 3.0 V8	(New Zealand) Bruce McLaren		6						
1969	M10A	Chevrolet; 5.0 V8	(United Kingdom) Peter Gethin			Ret					
1970	M14A	Ford Cosworth DFV; 3.0 V8		ROC	INT	OUL					
1970	M14A	Ford Cosworth DFV; 3.0 V8	(New Zealand) Bruce McLaren	Ret	4						
1970	M14A	Ford Cosworth DFV; 3.0 V8	(New Zealand) Denny Hulme	3	6						
1970	M7A	Ford Cosworth DFV; 3.0 V8	(United Kingdom) Peter Gethin	6							
1970	M7A	Ford Cosworth DFV; 3.0 V8	(Sweden) Reine Wisell		5						
1970	M7C	Ford Cosworth DFV; 3.0 V8	(United Kingdom) John Surtees	Ret							
1971	M7C	Ford Cosworth DFV; 3.0 V8		ARG	ROC	QUE	SPR	INT	RIN	OUL	VIC
1971	M7C	Ford Cosworth DFV; 3.0 V8	(Argentina) Carlos Reutemann	3							
1971	M14A	Ford Cosworth DFV; 3.0 V8	(United Kingdom) Peter Gethin		Ret	8	2^{F}	2	Ret		
1971	M19A	Ford Cosworth DFV; 3.0 V8	(New Zealand) Denny Hulme		Ret	3					
1971	M19A	Ford Cosworth DFV; 3.0 V8	(United Kingdom) Jackie Oliver								Ret
1972	M19A	Ford Cosworth DFV; 3.0 V8		ROC	BRA	INT	OUL	REP	VIC		
1972	M19A	Ford Cosworth DFV; 3.0 V8	(New Zealand) Denny Hulme	3			1				
1972	M19C	Ford Cosworth DFV; 3.0 V8	(New Zealand) Denny Hulme			4					
1972	M19A	Ford Cosworth DFV; 3.0 V8	(United States) Peter Revson	8		5					
1972	M19A	Ford Cosworth DFV; 3.0 V8	(South Africa) Jody Scheckter						NC		
1972	M19C	Ford Cosworth DFV; 3.0 V8	(United Kingdom) Brian Redman						7		
1973	M19C	Ford Cosworth DFV; 3.0 V8		ROC	INT						
1973	M19C	Ford Cosworth DFV; 3.0 V8	(South Africa) Jody Scheckter	Ret							
1973	M23	Ford Cosworth DFV; 3.0 V8	(New Zealand) Denny Hulme	2	Ret						
1973	M23	Ford Cosworth DFV; 3.0 V8	(United States) Peter Revson		4						
1974	M23	Ford Cosworth DFV; 3.0 V8		PRE	ROC	INT					
1974	M23	Ford Cosworth DFV; 3.0 V8	(Brazil) Emerson Fittipaldi	1^{F}	3						
1974	M23	Ford Cosworth DFV; 3.0 V8	(New Zealand) Denny Hulme		NC	Ret					
1974	M23	Ford Cosworth DFV; 3.0 V8	(United Kingdom) Mike Hailwood		4	Ret					
1974	M19A	Ford Cosworth DFV; 3.0 V8	(United Kingdom) Brian Redman			Ret					
1975	M23	Ford Cosworth DFV; 3.0 V8		ROC	INT	SUI					
1975	M23	Ford Cosworth DFV; 3.0 V8	(Brazil) Emerson Fittipaldi	5	2^{F}	Ret					
1975	M23	Ford Cosworth DFV; 3.0 V8	(Germany) Jochen Mass	Ret		3					
1976	M23	Ford Cosworth DFV; 3.0 V8		ROC	INT						
1976	M23	Ford Cosworth DFV; 3.0 V8	(United Kingdom) James Hunt	1^{F}	1^{P}^{F}						
1977	M23	Ford Cosworth DFV; 3.0 V8		ROC							
1977	M23	Ford Cosworth DFV; 3.0 V8	(United Kingdom) James Hunt	1^{F}							
1978	M26	Ford Cosworth DFV; 3.0 V8		INT							
1978	M26	Ford Cosworth DFV; 3.0 V8	(United Kingdom) James Hunt	Ret							
1978	M23	Ford Cosworth DFV; 3.0 V8	(United Kingdom) Tony Trimmer	3							
1978	M23	Ford Cosworth DFV; 3.0 V8	(United States) Brett Lunger	4							
1978	M23	Ford Cosworth DFV; 3.0 V8	(Spain) Emilio de Villota	Ret							
1979	M28	Ford Cosworth DFV; 3.0 V8		ROC	GNM	DIN					
1979	M28	Ford Cosworth DFV; 3.0 V8	(United Kingdom) John Watson	Ret							
1979	M28	Ford Cosworth DFV; 3.0 V8	(France) Patrick Tambay			8					
1980	M29B	Ford Cosworth DFV; 3.0 V8		ESP							
1980	M29B	Ford Cosworth DFV; 3.0 V8	(United Kingdom) John Watson	Ret							
1980	M29B	Ford Cosworth DFV; 3.0 V8	(France) Alain Prost	Ret							
1981	M29B	Ford Cosworth DFV; 3.0 V8		RSA							
1981	M29B	Ford Cosworth DFV; 3.0 V8	(Italy) Andrea de Cesaris	Ret							
1981	M29C	Ford Cosworth DFV; 3.0 V8	(United Kingdom) John Watson	5							
1983	MP4/1C	Ford Cosworth DFV; 3.0 V8		ROC							
1983	MP4/1C	Ford Cosworth DFV; 3.0 V8	(United Kingdom) John Watson	Ret							
