= McLaren MP4-20 =

Formula One racing Car

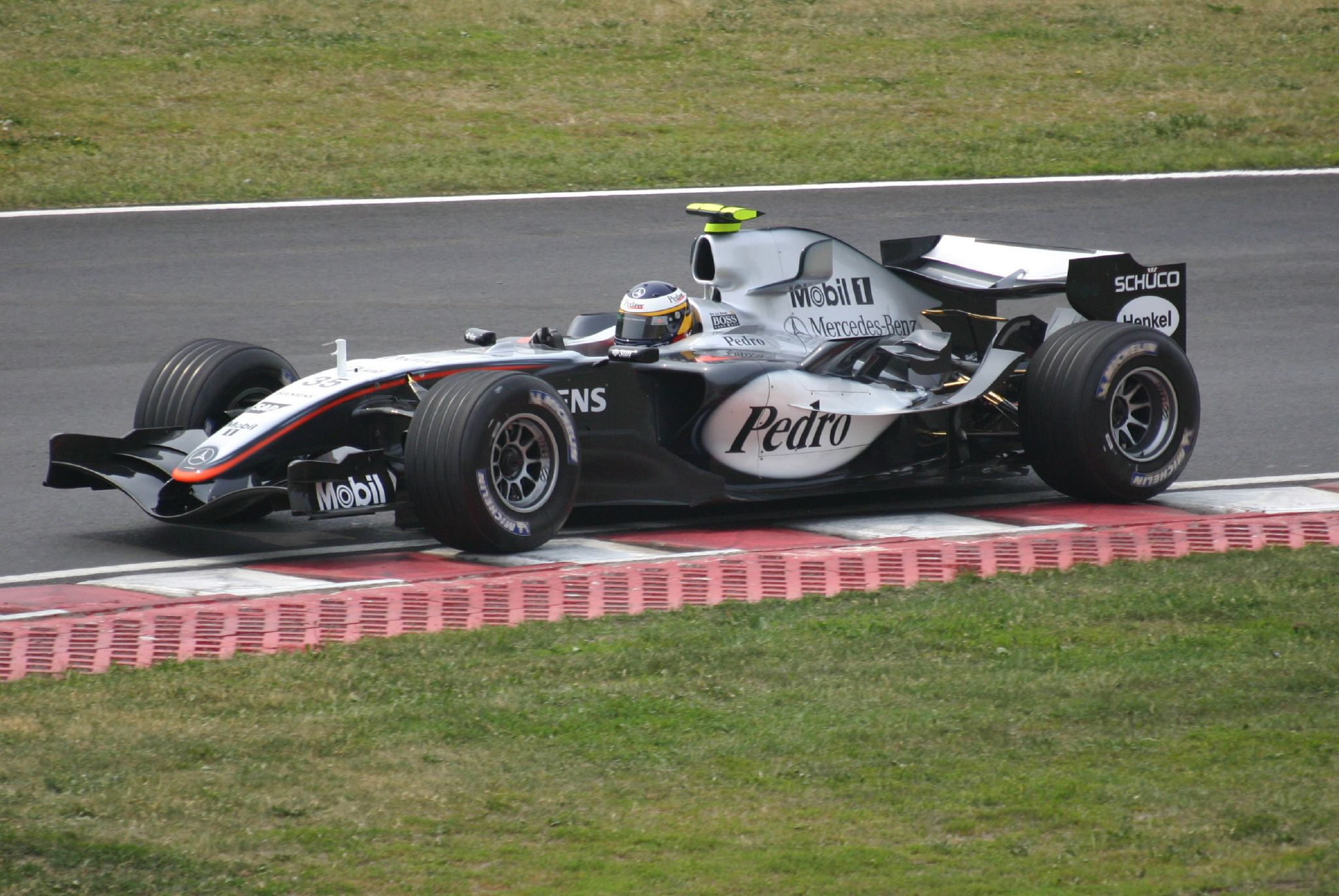
- Pedro de La Rosa driving the MP4-20 at the 2005 Canadian Grand Prix
- Category: Formula One
- Constructor: McLaren
- Designers: Neil Oatley (Executive Engineer); Adrian Newey (Technical Director); Paddy Lowe (Chief Engineer, Systems Development); Pat Fry (Chief Engineer, Race Development); Nikolas Tombazis (Chief Engineer, Vehicle Projects); Tim Goss (Chief Engineer, Powertrain); Mark Williams (Chief Engineer, Vehicle Performance); Mike Coughlan (Chief Designer); Peter Prodromou (Head of Aerodynamics); Mario Illien (Technical Director, Engine - Ilmor-Mercedes); Axel Wendorff (Chief Engineer, Engine - Ilmor-Mercedes)
- Predecessor: MP4-19B
- Successor: MP4-21

Technical specifications
- Chassis: Moulded carbon fibre/aluminium honeycomb composite incorporating front and side impact structures
- Suspension (front): Inboard torsion bar/damper system operated by pushrod and bell crank with a double wishbone arrangement
- Suspension (rear): As front
- Length: 4,770 mm (188 in)
- Width: 1,800 mm (71 in)
- Height: 950 mm (37 in)
- Wheelbase: 3,200 mm (126 in)
- Engine: Mercedes-Benz FO110R, 3.0-litre V10 (90º) naturally-aspirated mid-engined
- Transmission: McLaren 7 forward + 1 reverse sequential semi-automatic
- Power: 930 hp (694 kW) @ 19,000 rpm
- Fuel: Mobil Synergy Unleaded race fuels
- Lubricants: Mobil 1
- Tyres: Michelin

Competition history
- Notable entrants: West McLaren Mercedes (1−7, 9, 12); Team McLaren Mercedes (8, 10-11, 13−19)
- Notable drivers: 9. (Finland) Kimi Räikkönen; 10. (Colombia) Juan Pablo Montoya; 10. (Spain) Pedro de la Rosa; 10. (Austria) Alexander Wurz
- Debut: 2005 Australian Grand Prix
- First win: 2005 Spanish Grand Prix
- Last win: 2005 Japanese Grand Prix
- Last event: 2005 Chinese Grand Prix
Races	Wins	Podiums	Poles	F/Laps
19	10	18	7	12
- Constructors' Championships: 0
- Drivers' Championships: 0

The McLaren MP4-20 was the car with which the McLaren team competed in the 2005 Formula One World Championship. The chassis was designed by Adrian Newey, Paddy Lowe, Pat Fry, Mike Coughlan and Peter Prodromou with Mario Illien designing the bespoke Ilmor engine. The car was driven by Kimi Räikkönen in his 4th season with the team and Juan Pablo Montoya who moved from Williams. The MP4-20 was the last McLaren car to be powered by Mercedes-Benz under the Ilmor partnership since the 1995 season.

== New design ==
The car's chassis was an almost completely new design after the failure of the MP4-18 and MP4-19. The new car featured the revised aerodynamics and suspension set up that the 2005 regulations required, including a raised front wing, smaller diffuser and rear wing moved further forward. A shorter wheelbase was used to maximise the Michelin tyres' performance. The car featured distinctive 'horn' wings fitted to the bodywork behind the overhead air intake in an attempt to claw back as much downforce as possible lost through the FIA's rule changes. The wide, flat nose design was initially trialled on the MP4-19 at the 2004 Italian Grand Prix, but not retained for the rest of that season. It was fully utilised for 2005.

== Season summary ==
The car was fast but unreliable in testing and whilst Kimi Räikkönen used the car as best as he could in the early part of the season, Juan Pablo Montoya (who had joined the team from Williams) initially struggled to get to grips with the setup and unusual driving technique the car required over the Williams chassis he was used to. He was not helped by an off-track injury that put him out for two races early in the year. His stand-ins for those 2 races, Pedro de la Rosa for Bahrain and Alexander Wurz for San Marino finished fifth (including the fastest lap) and third respectively. Montoya eventually settled with the car and scored three wins and several podiums.

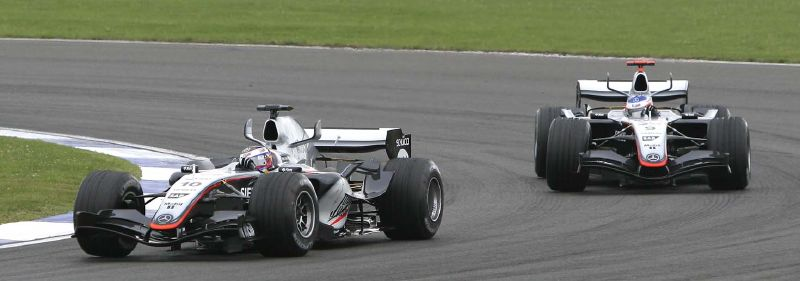
Montoya leads Räikkönen at McLaren's home race, the British Grand Prix. The former would go on to win the race, with the latter in third.

The Mercedes engine was the most powerful in F1 that year but suffered reliability problems which cost Räikkönen the world championship to Fernando Alonso and McLaren the Constructors' Championship to Renault despite McLaren winning 10 races to Renault's 8 wins. Räikkönen won seven races and was in a position to win at least three others but the car's unreliability cost him the title. Montoya also suffered from reliability problems which cost him a potential win in Hungary and potential podium finishes in France and China.

Continual development throughout the year made the MP4-20 the fastest car in F1 from mid-season onwards, as was seen by the number of pole positions and fastest laps accumulated by both Räikkönen and Montoya.

Räikkönen and McLaren eventually finished second in their respective championships, whilst Montoya finished fourth in the drivers' standings.

At the Hungarian Grand Prix Räikkönen declined the traditional champagne spraying as a mark tribute to 29-year-old McLaren chef Darren Hawker, who died on 27 July. Hawker fell from the eighth floor of the Marriott Hotel in Budapest. It was not the first time that such an event befell F1, as in 1991 a Lotus mechanic died in similar circumstances at the San Marino Grand Prix.

== J-damper ==
The tuned J-damper was introduced as part of the suspension system by McLaren on its car the MP4-20, at the 2005 San Marino Grand Prix. The systems first existence was revealed in the 2007 Formula One espionage controversy when the device was noted as one of the drawings taken to Renault when Phil Mackereth left McLaren.

== Sponsorship and livery ==
McLaren went into 2005 with renewed major sponsorships such as Mobil 1, Mercedes-Benz, SAP, Siemens, Hugo Boss, Sun Microsystems, AT&T, Schüco and Henkel Corporation. The livery was similar to the 2004 design with subtle changes, most notably the front of the rear wing did not feature any sponsorship.

This would be the final McLaren car to feature the grey and black livery of primary sponsor West, a partnership which began with the MP4/12 in 1997. McLaren used the 'West' logos, except at the Canadian, French, British and Hungarian Grands Prix onwards to the end of the season; where they were replaced by the drivers' names. At the Hungarian Grand Prix, McLaren ran with the West livery on Friday.

The team also received new sponsorship with Johnnie Walker replacing West as title sponsor from the Hungarian Grand Prix onwards due to the tobacco advertising ban in the European Union on 31 July 2005. In Turkey, the logo was removed.

== McLaren MP4-20B ==
McLaren was one of the first teams that already tested with the 2006 V8 engines in the summer of 2005. The car had the known traditional papaya orange test livery and was test driven by de la Rosa.

== Aftermath ==
In an interview for Formula One's Beyond the Grid podcast released on 8 December 2021, days before the final Grand Prix of his career at the 2021 Abu Dhabi Grand Prix, Räikkönen declared the MP4-20 to be his favourite F1 car to drive in his career.

== Complete Formula One results ==
(key) (results in bold indicate pole position)

Year	Chassis	Engine	Tyres	Drivers	1	2	3	4	5	6	7	8	9	10	11	12	13	14	15	16	17	18	19	Pts.^{‡}	WCC
2005	MP4-20	Mercedes FO 110R 3.0 V10	**M**		AUS	MAL	BHR	SMR	ESP	MON	EUR	CAN	USA	FRA	GBR	GER	HUN	TUR	ITA	BEL	BRA	JPN	CHN	**182**	**2nd**
2005	MP4-20	Mercedes FO 110R 3.0 V10	**M**	(Finland) Kimi Räikkönen	8	9	3	**Ret**	**1**	**1**	11^{†}	1	DNS	2	3	**Ret**	1	**1**	4	1	2	1	2	**182**	**2nd**
2005	MP4-20	Mercedes FO 110R 3.0 V10	**M**	(Colombia) Juan Pablo Montoya	6	4			7	5	7	DSQ	DNS	Ret	1	2	Ret	3	**1**	**14**^{†}	1	Ret	Ret	**182**	**2nd**
2005	MP4-20	Mercedes FO 110R 3.0 V10	**M**	(Spain) Pedro de la Rosa			5																	**182**	**2nd**
2005	MP4-20	Mercedes FO 110R 3.0 V10	**M**	(Austria) Alexander Wurz				3																**182**	**2nd**

† – Driver did not finish the Grand Prix, but were classified as they completed more than 90% of the race distance.

Awards
Preceded by Ferrari F2004	Autosport; Racing Car of the Year; 2005	Succeeded by Renault R26
