= McLaren MP4-19 =

Formula One racing car

McLaren MP4-19 McLaren MP4-19B
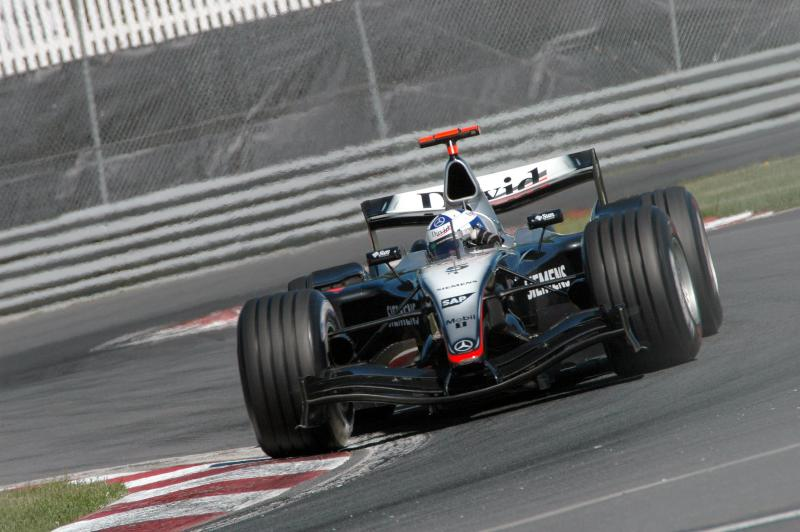
- David Coulthard driving the MP4-19 at the 2004 Canadian Grand Prix
- Category: Formula One
- Constructor: McLaren
- Designers: Neil Oatley (Executive Engineer); Adrian Newey (Technical Director); Paddy Lowe (Chief Engineer, Systems Development); Pat Fry (Chief Engineer, Race Development); Nikolas Tombazis (Chief Engineer, Vehicle Projects); Tim Goss (Chief Engineer, Powertrain); Mark Williams (Chief Engineer, Vehicle Performance); Mike Coughlan (Chief Designer); Peter Prodromou (Head of Aerodynamics); Mario Illien (Technical Director, Engine - Ilmor-Mercedes); Werner Laurenz (Engineering Director, Engine - Ilmor-Mercedes)
- Predecessor: MP4-17D / MP4-18
- Successor: MP4-20

Technical specifications
- Chassis: Carbon-fibre monocoque
- Suspension (front): Inboard torsion bar/damper system operated by pushrod and bell crank with a double wishbone arrangement
- Suspension (rear): Inboard torsion bar/damper system operated by pushrod and bell crank with a double wishbone arrangement
- Length: 4,630 mm (182 in)
- Width: 1,800 mm (71 in)
- Height: 950 mm (37 in)
- Wheelbase: 3,100 mm (122 in)
- Engine: Mercedes-Benz FO110Q 3.0-litre V10 (90°) naturally-aspirated mid-engine
- Transmission: McLaren 7-speed longitudinal semi-automatic sequential
- Power: 870 hp @ 18,500 rpm
- Fuel: Exxon, Mobil
- Lubricants: Mobil 1
- Tyres: Michelin

Competition history
- Notable entrants: West McLaren Mercedes
- Notable drivers: 5. (United Kingdom) David Coulthard; 6. (Finland) Kimi Räikkönen
- Debut: 2004 Australian Grand Prix
- First win: 2004 Belgian Grand Prix
- Last win: 2004 Belgian Grand Prix
- Last event: 2004 Brazilian Grand Prix
Races	Wins	Poles	F/Laps
18	1	1	2
- Constructors' Championships: 0
- Drivers' Championships: 0

The McLaren MP4-19 was the car with which the McLaren team competed in the 2004 Formula One World Championship. The car was driven by Briton David Coulthard and Finn Kimi Räikkönen, in their ninth and third seasons with the team respectively.

== History ==
The chassis was designed by Adrian Newey, Paddy Lowe, Pat Fry, Mike Coughlan and Peter Prodromou with Mario Illien designing the bespoke Ilmor engine. It was described as a "debugged version" of the ill-fated McLaren MP4-18, but it was not a successful car. The team suffered various problems concerning reliability at the beginning of the season, with eight retirements in the first seven races. Launch control and fully-automatic gearboxes were also banned for 2004, meaning the driver had to start using the paddle-shifters, and find the effective bite point and release the clutch manually, again. These electronic driver aids had been used by the team for the previous three seasons, since the 2001 Spanish Grand Prix.

By mid-season, a new car, the MP4-19B, was required. This was an all-new car with a radically redesigned aerodynamic package. The results were immediately positive and gave the team hope of a better end to the season. Coulthard qualified third for the MP4-19B's first race at the French Grand Prix, followed by further points and podiums. The upgrade was finally justified when Räikkönen gave the team its only win of the season when he won the Belgian Grand Prix.

For most of the season, the MP4-19 featured a narrow, needle-like nose design first seen on the MP4-18. A wider, flatter nose was trialed at the Italian Grand Prix but was not retained. This would later be carried over to the MP4-20 in 2005, whilst the needle nose would be reused on the MP4-21 in 2006.

The team eventually finished fifth in the Constructors' Championship with 69 points, the team's lowest finish of the McLaren-Mercedes partnership since the 1996 season.

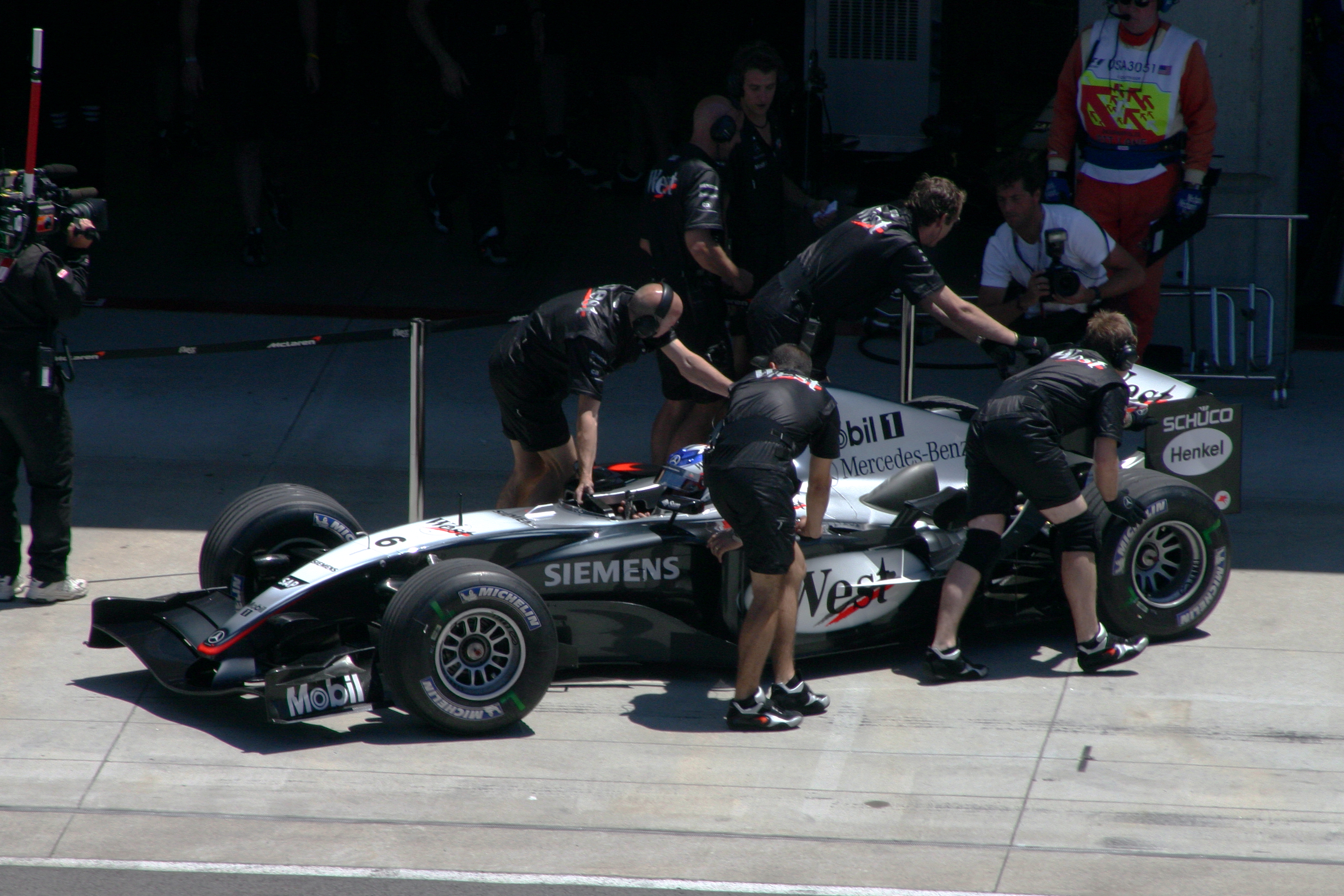
Members of the McLaren Formula One team push driver Kimi Räikkönen's MP4-19 into the garage during qualifying for the US Grand Prix at Indianapolis in 2004.

== Sponsorship and livery ==
McLaren went into the 2004 season with a subtle livery change. Renewed sponsors including Siemens, SAP and Schüco but most notably was Henkel, who owns Loctite replacing it.

McLaren used the 'West' logos, except at the Canadian, French and British Grands Prix where it used the respective drivers' first name.

== Complete Formula One results ==
(key) (results in bold indicate pole position)

Year	Entrant	Chassis	Engine	Tyres	Drivers	1	2	3	4	5	6	7	8	9	10	11	12	13	14	15	16	17	18	Points	WCC
2004	McLaren	MP4-19	Mercedes V10	**MI**		AUS	MAL	BHR	SMR	ESP	MON	EUR	CAN	USA	FRA	GBR	GER	HUN	BEL	ITA	CHN	JPN	BRA	69	5th
2004	McLaren	MP4-19	Mercedes V10	**MI**	(United Kingdom) David Coulthard	8	6	Ret	12	10	Ret	Ret	6	7										69	5th
2004	McLaren	MP4-19	Mercedes V10	**MI**	(Finland) Kimi Räikkönen	Ret	Ret	Ret	8	11	Ret	Ret	5	6										69	5th
2004	McLaren	MP4-19B	Mercedes V10	**MI**	(United Kingdom) David Coulthard										6	7	4	9	7	6	9	Ret	11	69	5th
2004	McLaren	MP4-19B	Mercedes V10	**MI**	(Finland) Kimi Räikkönen										7	**2**	Ret	Ret	1	Ret	3	6	2	69	5th
