= Mark Preston (businessman) =

Australian motorsport professional (born 1968)

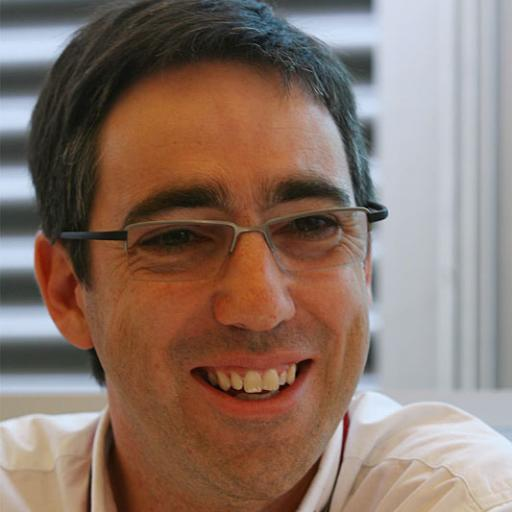
- Mark Preston
- Born: 7 November 1968 (age 57); Geelong, Australia
- Education: Monash University
- Occupations: Marketing Director, Lola Cars and CEO, StreetDrone
- Employer: Lola Cars
- Known for: Formula One, Formula E
- Website: www.streetdrone.org www.techeetahfe.com

Mark Andrew Preston (born 7 November 1968) is an Australian businessman and motorsport professional. He is currently the Motorsport Director of Lola Cars, and Director of Technology Integration - Industrial Autonomy of Oxa.

He has a long history in motorsport, particularly in Formula One, having worked for Arrows Grand Prix International, McLaren and Super Aguri F1.

== Personal life ==
Preston was born in Geelong, Australia. Raised in Melbourne, he graduated from the Monash University with a degree in mechanical engineering in 1992. During his studies, he also worked as a part-time design engineer with Borland Racing Developments, which launched his career in motorsport.

== Early career ==
Following his graduation from Monash University, Preston joined Tieman Industries, a company specialising in the design, manufacture, and sales of dry bulk and bulk liquid road tankers. In 1993, he was appointed as a Project Manager at Holden, a role he later occupied for Holden Special Vehicles, where he designed custom vehicles for local and global markets.

Preston worked in parallel developing Spectrum Racing Cars with Borland Racing, where the Spectrum 05 was designed and run in the 1996 Australian Formula Ford Championship in 1996, where the team secured second place in the race with Jason Bargwanna. Spectrum went on to win a number of Australian championships in Formula Ford.

== Formula One career ==
To pursue his dream of working in Formula One, Preston relocated to the UK in 1996 and secured a role with Arrows F1 team through his connections at Holden Special Vehicles.

Preston stayed with the Arrows F1 team for six years, occupying the roles of Stress Analysis Engineer, Senior Vehicle Performance Analyst, and Head of Research and Development. In these roles, he was responsible for computer aided analysis, vehicle dynamics, research and development laboratories and the test team.

Following the collapse of the Arrows F1 team in 2002, Preston joined the McLaren F1 Racing team as the Principal Designer, and was later promoted to Head of Vehicle Technology Laboratories. In the latter role he oversaw the development of the radical McLaren MP4-18A alongside Technical Director Adrian Newey and Chief Designer Mike Coughlan.

After two years with the McLaren F1 Racing team, Preston left to establish his own outfit, Preston Racing, with the aim of starting his own Formula One team. Collaborating with ex-Arrows F1 employees and former Formula One driver, Aguri Suzuki, Preston created the Super Aguri F1 team.

Through Suzuki's connections, the team was able to secure the support of Honda, who supplied the team's engines from 2006 to 2008. Preston was appointed as Super Aguri's Chief Technical Officer and played a fundamental role in creating the team in just 100 days, with the SA05 cars making their debut in the 2006 Bahrain Grand Prix after the team's entry was ratified by the FIA on 26 January 2006.

Preston continued with the team as Technical Director for two further seasons, until Super Aguri's withdrawal from Formula One in 2008.

== Formula E career ==
In 2014, Preston founded the Super Aguri Formula E team in partnership with Aguri Suzuki. The squad, later called the Amlin Aguri Formula E team, was one of ten entrants to participate in the inaugural FIA Formula E Championship – the first FIA-sanctioned electric motorsport series in the world.

The outfit was rebranded as Team Aguri for the 2015/16 Formula E Championship, with Preston continuing as Team Principal. In this role he was responsible for the strategy and development of the team.

Mark became the team principal of the new Techeetah Formula E Team in August 2016. Techeetah was the only private team in the ABB FIA Formula E Championship during the 2017/2018 season. The team went on to win the 2017/2018 Drivers Title with its driver Jean-Éric Vergne. Techeetah has partnered with DS Automobiles for the 2018/2019 Season 5 of the all-electric street racing series to become a manufacturer team and went on to take both titles at the New York City ePrix to become the first team in Formula E history to win back to back titles.

== Other work ==
Between 2008 and 2014, Preston was the managing director of Formtech Composites Ltd, a business specialising in the design, development and manufacture of lightweight carbon fibre composite components.

In May 2015, Preston became the Founder and Director of the MobOx Foundation C.I.C – a laboratory in Oxford that runs studies into future technologies.

In April 2017, along with entrepreneur Mike Potts, Preston launched StreetDrone, an open platform aiming to democratise the development of autonomous vehicle technology.

== Qualifications and research ==
During his work in motorsport, Preston has achieved a number of academic qualifications and been involved in several technology businesses.

He holds an MBA from the University of Oxford in 2006 and was involved in the Department of Engineering Science's Tidal Energy Research Group during his studies. In this capacity, Preston was involved in the development and commercialisation of the Transverse Horizontal Axis Water Turbine – an underwater device that generates power from tidal flows.
