= McLaren MP4-16 =

Formula One racing car

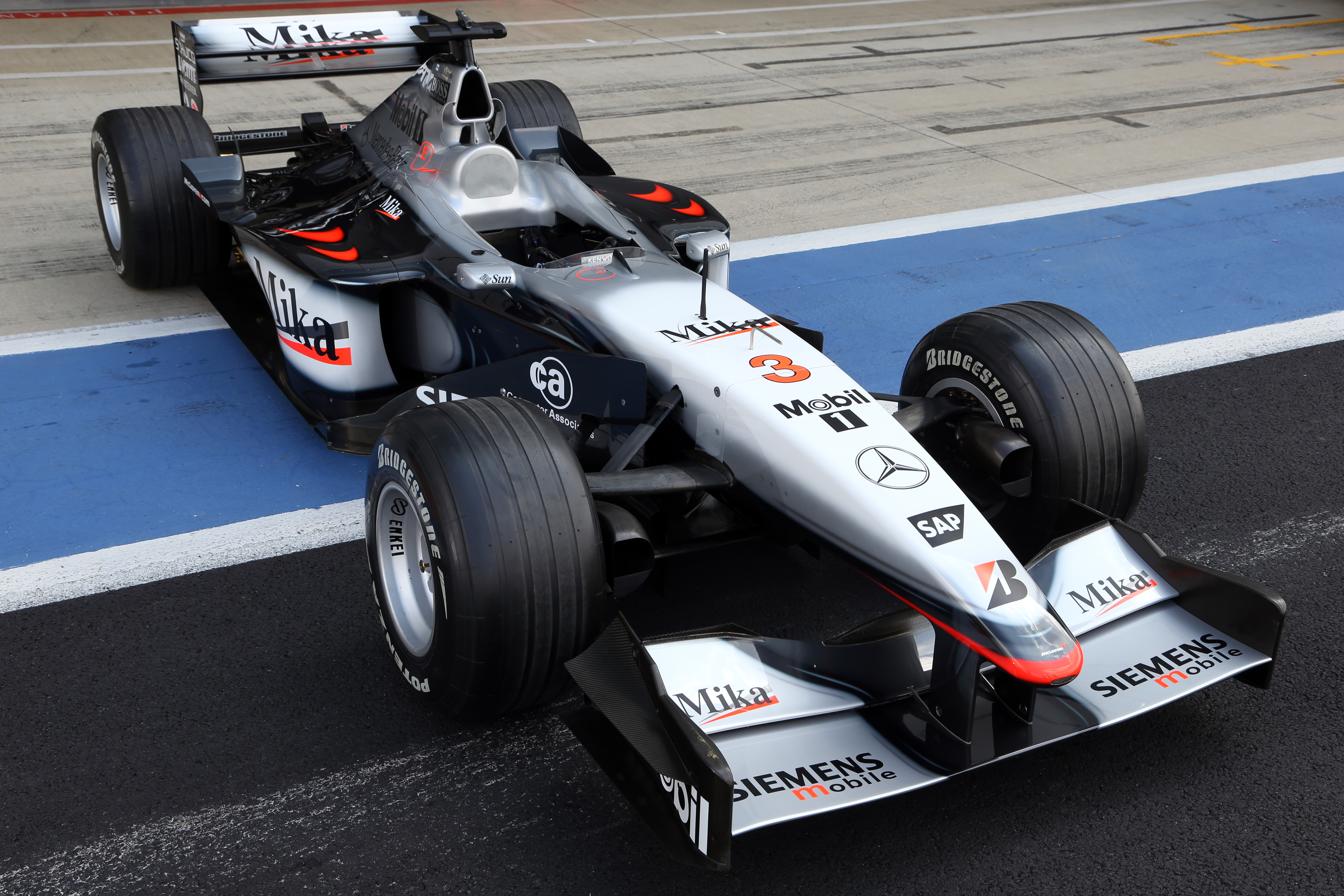
- Mika Häkkinen's MP4-16A during a shakedown at Silverstone Circuit in 2015
- Category: Formula One
- Constructor: McLaren
- Designers: Adrian Newey (Technical Director); Neil Oatley (Chief Designer); Steve Nichols (Engineering Director); Matthew Jeffreys (Head of Vehicle Design); David North (Head of Transmission); David Neilson (Head of Suspension); Paddy Lowe (Head of R&D); Peter Prodromou (Head of Aerodynamics); Mario Illien (Technical Director, Engine - Ilmor-Mercedes); Stuart Grove (Chief Designer, Engine - Ilmor-Mercedes)
- Predecessor: MP4/15
- Successor: MP4-17

Technical specifications
- Chassis: Carbon-fibre monocoque
- Suspension (front): double wishbone, inboard torsion bar/damper system, pushrod, and bell crank-activated
- Suspension (rear): double wishbone, inboard torsion bar/damper system, pushrod, and bell crank-activated
- Engine: Mercedes-Benz FO110K 3.0 L (183 cu in) V10 (72°) naturally aspirated,
- Transmission: McLaren 7-Speed longitudinal semi-automatic sequential
- Power: 830 hp (619 kW) @ 17,800 RPM
- Fuel: Mobil Unleaded
- Lubricants: Mobil 1
- Tyres: Bridgestone

Competition history
- Notable entrants: West McLaren Mercedes
- Notable drivers: 3. (Finland) Mika Häkkinen; 4. (United Kingdom) David Coulthard
- Debut: 2001 Australian Grand Prix
- First win: 2001 Brazilian Grand Prix
- Last win: 2001 United States Grand Prix
- Last event: 2001 Japanese Grand Prix
Races	Wins	Poles	F/Laps
17	4	2	6
- Constructors' Championships: 0
- Drivers' Championships: 0

The McLaren MP4-16 was the car with which the McLaren team competed in the 2001 Formula One World Championship. The chassis was designed by Adrian Newey, Steve Nichols, Neil Oatley and Peter Prodromou, with Mario Illien designing the bespoke Ilmor engine. It featured innovations used in later F1 cars such as the blown diffuser, which would be used in the championship success of the Red Bull RB6 and Red Bull RB7. It was driven by double world champion Mika Häkkinen and David Coulthard in what would be their sixth and final season together as McLaren teammates.

== Competition history ==
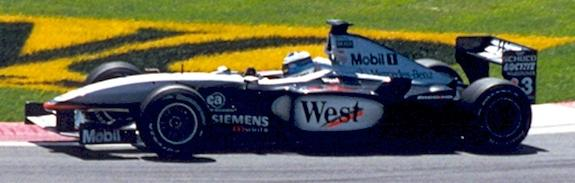
Mika Häkkinen driving the MP4-16 at the 2001 Canadian Grand Prix.

After being narrowly pipped to both titles by Ferrari in 2000, the goal of 2001 was to get McLaren back on top. However, the season proved to be frustrating in more ways than one. The chassis was good, but it was not developed enough to keep pace with Ferrari or new rivals Williams and also suffered from niggling aerodynamic problems; the Mercedes-Benz engines were less powerful than Williams's BMW units and less reliable than Ferrari's in-house efforts; and the team did not do a good enough job regarding the return of electronic driver aids.

Moreover, Häkkinen had his least successful season since 1997, suffering both from appalling luck and a loss of form at many races. The most notable incident was in Spain when he suffered a last-lap clutch/engine failure while leading. Despite winning two Grands Prix, he elected to retire (originally announced as a sabbatical) at the end of the season, and would be replaced by compatriot Kimi Räikkönen. Coulthard, by contrast, produced the best season of his career to date, winning two races early on and mounting a championship challenge to Michael Schumacher. However, McLaren lost this early parity with Ferrari and he was fortunate to keep second place in the Drivers' Championship ahead of Ferrari's number two, Rubens Barrichello.

Similarly, the team regarded themselves as fortunate to come second in the Constructors' Championship, with 102 points, ahead of the resurgent Williams team.

== Steering wheel ==
Mika Häkkinen and David Coulthard used different shaped MP4-16 steering wheels. Häkkinen's version was the butterfly-style wheel, and Coulthard's included a lower grip. McLaren used four gearshift paddles in the MP4-16. The two blue paddles are the gear selectors, while the lower pair allow the driver to operate the clutch with either hand.

== Sponsorship and livery ==
McLaren Mercedes went into the 2001 season with renewed major sponsorships such as West, Mobil 1, Mercedes-Benz, Hugo Boss, Sun Microsystems, Computer Associates, Warsteiner, Schüco and Loctite. McLaren-Mercedes received new sponsorship such as SAP, Siemens Mobile and discontinued sponsorships are Fujitsu Siemens. The livery was similar to the 2000 design with subtle changes.

McLaren used 'West' logos, except at the French and British Grands Prix where it used the respective drivers' first name.

== Complete Formula One results ==
(key) (results in bold indicate pole position; results in italics indicate fastest lap)

Year	Team	Engine	Tyres	Drivers	1	2	3	4	5	6	7	8	9	10	11	12	13	14	15	16	17	Points	WCC
2001	West McLaren Mercedes	Mercedes-Benz V10	**B**		AUS	MAL	BRA	SMR	ESP	AUT	MON	CAN	EUR	FRA	GBR	GER	HUN	BEL	ITA	USA	JPN	**102**	**2nd**
2001	West McLaren Mercedes	Mercedes-Benz V10	**B**	Mika Häkkinen	Ret	6	Ret	4	9	Ret	Ret	3	6	DNS	1	Ret	5	4	Ret	1	4	**102**	**2nd**
2001	West McLaren Mercedes	Mercedes-Benz V10	**B**	David Coulthard	2	3	1	**2**	5	1	**5**	Ret	3	4	Ret	Ret	3	2	Ret	3	3	**102**	**2nd**
