= Prodromou =

Prodromou (Greek: Προδρόμου) is a Greek surname. It is the genitive form of prodromos (Greek: πρόδρομος), which means forerunner.

Notable people with this surname include:

- Evan Prodromou (born 1968), American software developer
- Andreas Prodromou, flight attendant in the Helios Airways Flight 522 accident
- Peter Prodromou (born 1969), British engineer
- Stav Prodromou (born 1944), Greek businessman
