= Prodromos =

Prodromos (Greek for "forerunner") may refer to:

- a title of John the Baptist
- Prodromoi, a light cavalry unit in Ancient Greece
- Prodromos, Paros
- Prodromos, Cyprus
- Prodromos (neighborhood in Larnaca), Cyprus
- Prodromus, a preliminary publication
- Prodromos, Mount Athos, an Athonite skete belonging to the Great Lavra Monastery
- Prodromos Monastery, in Arcadia

== Notable people ==
- Theodore Prodromos (c. 1100 – c. 1168), Byzantine writer
- Prodromos Bodosakis-Athanasiadis (1890–1979), Greek businessman
- Prodromos Dreliozis (born 1975), Greek basketball player
- Prodromos Kathiniotis, Greek television celebrity and singer
- Prodromos Meravidis (1910–1981), Greek film director
- Prodromos Nikolaidis (born 1978), Greek-Cypriot basketball player
- Prodromos Tsaousakis (1919–1979), Greek singer, songwriter, and composer

== See also ==
- Prodromou, a related surname
