= McLaren MP4-17 =

Formula One racing car

McLaren MP4-17 McLaren MP4-17D
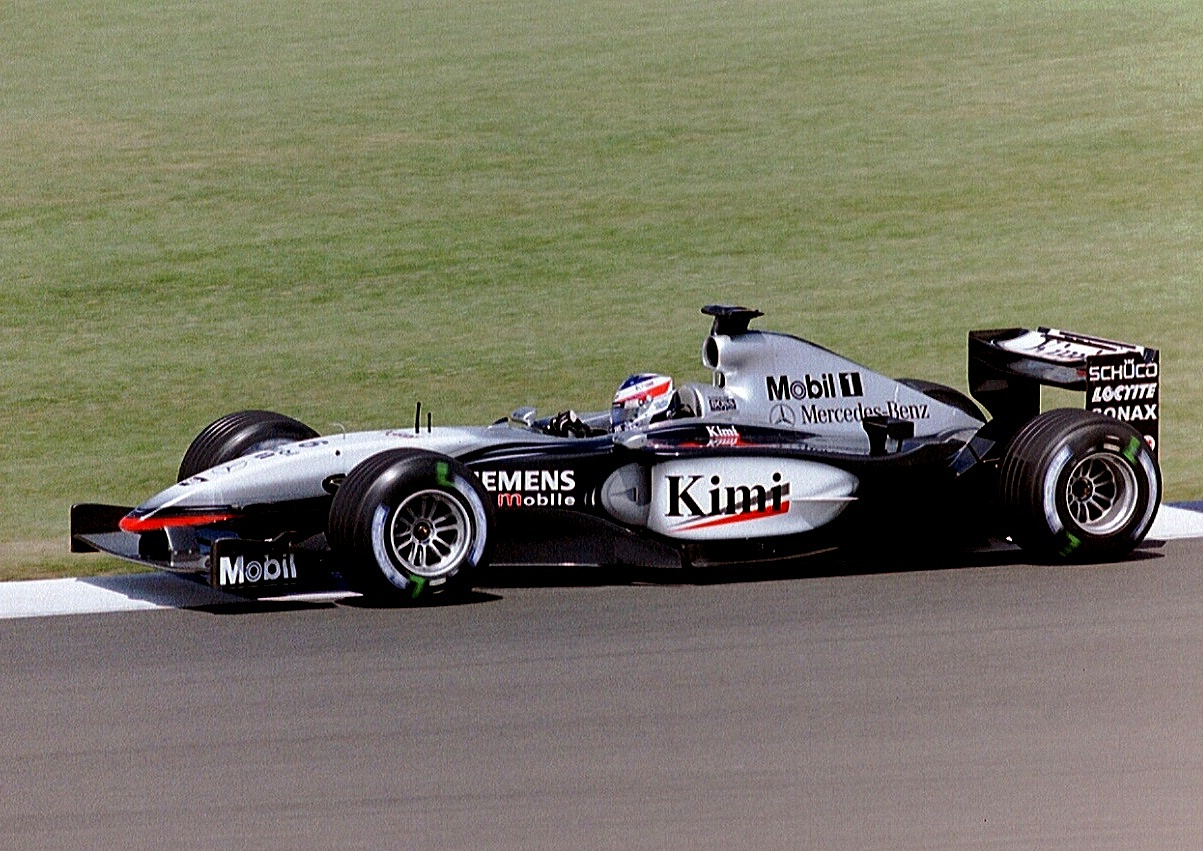
- Kimi Räikkönen driving the MP4-17D at the 2003 British Grand Prix
- Category: Formula One
- Constructor: McLaren
- Designers: Neil Oatley (Executive Engineer); Adrian Newey (Technical Director); Mike Coughlan (Chief Designer); Matthew Jeffreys (Head of Vehicle Design); Paddy Lowe (Chief Engineer, Systems Development); Pat Fry (Chief Engineer, Race Development); Tim Goss (Chief Engineer, Powertrain); Peter Prodromou (Head of Aerodynamics); Phil Adey (Chief Aerodynamicist); Mario Illien (Technical Director, Engine - Ilmor-Mercedes); Stuart Grove (Chief Designer, Engine - Ilmor-Mercedes)
- Predecessor: MP4-16
- Successor: MP4-18 / MP4-19

Technical specifications
- Chassis: Carbon-fibre monocoque
- Suspension (front): double wishbone, inboard torsion bar/damper system, pushrod and bell crank-activated
- Suspension (rear): double wishbone, inboard torsion bar/damper system, pushrod and bell crank-activated
- Length: 4,630 mm (182 in)
- Width: 1,800 mm (71 in)
- Height: 950 mm (37 in)
- Wheelbase: 3,100 mm (122 in)
- Engine: Mercedes-Benz FO110M / Mercedes-Benz FO110P 3.0-litre V10 (90º) naturally-aspirated mid-engine
- Transmission: McLaren 7-Speed longitudinal semi-automatic sequential
- Power: 845-850 hp @ 18,500 rpm
- Fuel: Mobil
- Lubricants: Mobil 1
- Tyres: Michelin

Competition history
- Notable entrants: West McLaren Mercedes
- Notable drivers: 3/5. (United Kingdom) David Coulthard; 4/6. (Finland) Kimi Räikkönen
- Debut: 2002 Australian Grand Prix
- First win: 2002 Monaco Grand Prix
- Last win: 2003 Malaysian Grand Prix
- Last event: 2003 Japanese Grand Prix
Races	Wins	Podiums	Poles	F/Laps
33	3	23	2	5
- Constructors' Championships: 0
- Drivers' Championships: 0

The McLaren MP4-17 is a Formula One car designed and constructed by McLaren to compete in the 2002 and 2003 Formula One World Championships. The car was driven by Briton David Coulthard and Finn Kimi Räikkönen in both seasons. This was the first McLaren Formula One car supplied with Michelin tyres since the MP4/2 in 1984.

== Background and development ==
=== McLaren in Formula One ===
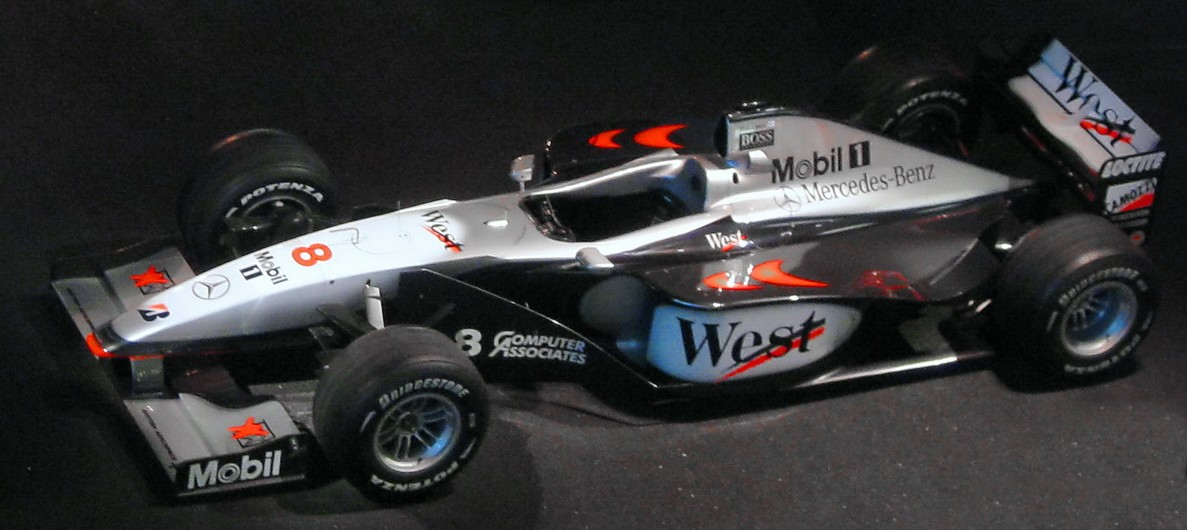
The MP4-13 helped McLaren and Mika Häkkinen secure the drivers' and constructors' titles in 1998.

Founded by Bruce McLaren in 1963, McLaren entered a new phase in 1995 by partnering with Mercedes-Benz as its engine supplier, following the end of its association with Honda (1988–1992) and interim supplies from Ford-Cosworth in 1993 and Peugeot in 1994. In 1997, the team's traditional white-and-red livery, linked to sponsor Marlboro since 1973, was replaced by a predominantly silver-and-black scheme reminiscent of the pre-1950s Silver Arrows.

In 1998, Mika Häkkinen won his first drivers' championship with the McLaren MP4-13, designed by Adrian Newey, while Coulthard contributed to McLaren's eighth constructors' title. Häkkinen secured a second title in 1999, McLaren's eleventh drivers' championship, though the team lost the constructors' title to Ferrari. By the end of 1999, McLaren held the most combined titles in Formula One history.

=== Rivalry with Ferrari in the early 2000s ===
In 2000, Ferrari claimed both championships, with Michael Schumacher taking the drivers' title—its first since 1979. McLaren finished second in the constructors' standings with seven wins to Ferrari's ten, while Häkkinen and Coulthard placed second and third in the drivers' championship.

Ferrari's dominance grew in 2001, with Schumacher winning nine races and his fourth title. McLaren's Mercedes-Benz V10 was less powerful than Ferrari's and BMW's in the Williams FW23. The McLaren MP4-16 faced aerodynamic and reliability issues. The team secured second in constructors' with four wins, and Coulthard was runners-up with 65 points to Schumacher's 123.

In 2002, Räikkönen replaced the retired Häkkinen. Despite four podiums for Räikkönen and one win for Coulthard at Monaco, the McLaren MP4-17 had reliability problems and underperformed. McLaren finished third with 65 points, behind Williams (92 points) and Ferrari, which won its fourth consecutive constructors' title and Schumacher his fifth drivers' title.

=== Preparation for 2003 ===
The FIA introduced cost-cutting rules for 2003, including bans on radio communication, traction control, automatic gearboxes, and spare cars, plus parc fermé between qualifying and races. McLaren opposed these changes.

== Car development ==
In late September 2002, team principal Ron Dennis announced the MP4-17D, an evolution of the MP4-17, would be used for early 2003 races until the McLaren MP4-18 was ready, mirroring Ferrari's 2002 strategy. Managing director Martin Whitmarsh noted untapped potential in the MP4-17, with upgrades planned except for the monocoque.

Coulthard and Norbert Haug were initially pessimistic due to the Mercedes-Benz engine's weight and power deficits. However, Coulthard later praised the upgrades, aiming to challenge Williams and then Ferrari.

In January 2003, reports suggested the MP4-18 might debut at the 2003 Spanish Grand Prix, but McLaren targeted the 2003 San Marino Grand Prix.

=== Technical aspects ===
The MP4-17D weighed 600 kg (1,300 lb) with a carbon fibre and aluminium honeycomb monocoque. It featured a sharper nose and revised rear wing compared to the MP4-17. Suspensions used double wishbones, torsion bars, and Penske pushrod dampers. Wheels were Enkei with Michelin tyres. Hitco supplied carbon brakes, replacing Carbone Industrie, with AP Racing calipers.

It used the Mercedes-Benz FO 110P V10, producing 850 hp (630 kW) at 18,500 rpm (308 Hz), an upgrade from the FO 108M. Fuel and lubricants came from Mobil 1. A seven-speed semi-automatic gearbox and TAG Electronic Systems electronics completed the package.

=== Steering wheel ===
Kimi Räikkönen and David Coulthard used different shaped MP4/17 steering wheels in the 2002 season. Räikkönen's version was the butterfly-style wheel, and Coulthard's included a lower grip. In a Monaco onwards, Coulthard adopted adopted the butterfly-style wheel.

== Driver selection ==
Coulthard, with McLaren since 1996, partnered Räikkönen in his third season and second with the team. Räikkönen had outqualified Coulthard 10 times in 2002 despite the latter's Monaco win and higher points. Niki Lauda predicted pressure on Coulthard, but Dennis praised the balanced lineup. Coulthard hired a new fitness trainer.

Test driver Alexander Wurz was joined by Pedro de la Rosa after his Jaguar release. De la Rosa signed in April 2003.

== Winter testing ==
=== End-of-2002 testing ===
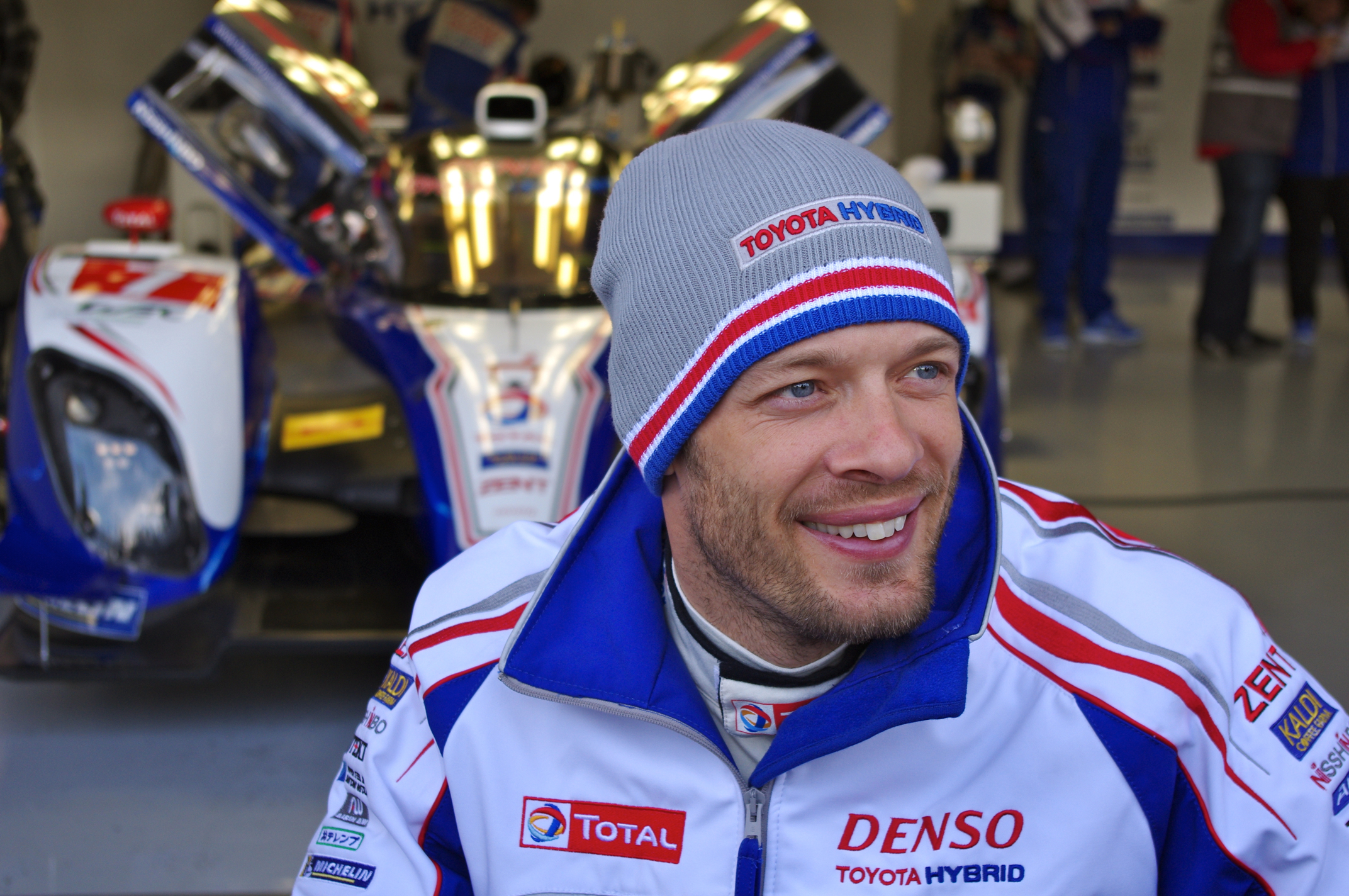
Alexander Wurz participated in all winter tests.

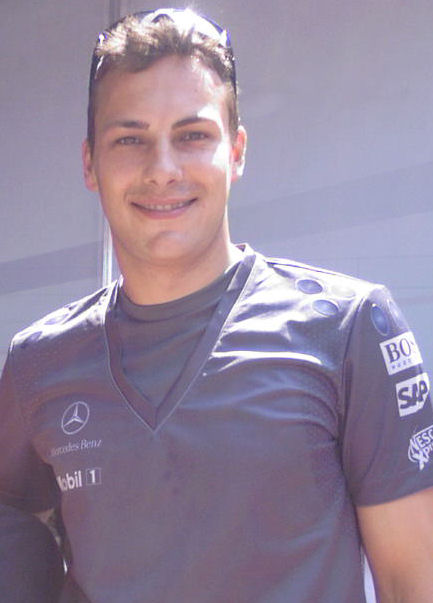
Gary Paffett tested the MP4-17D in Barcelona in December 2002.

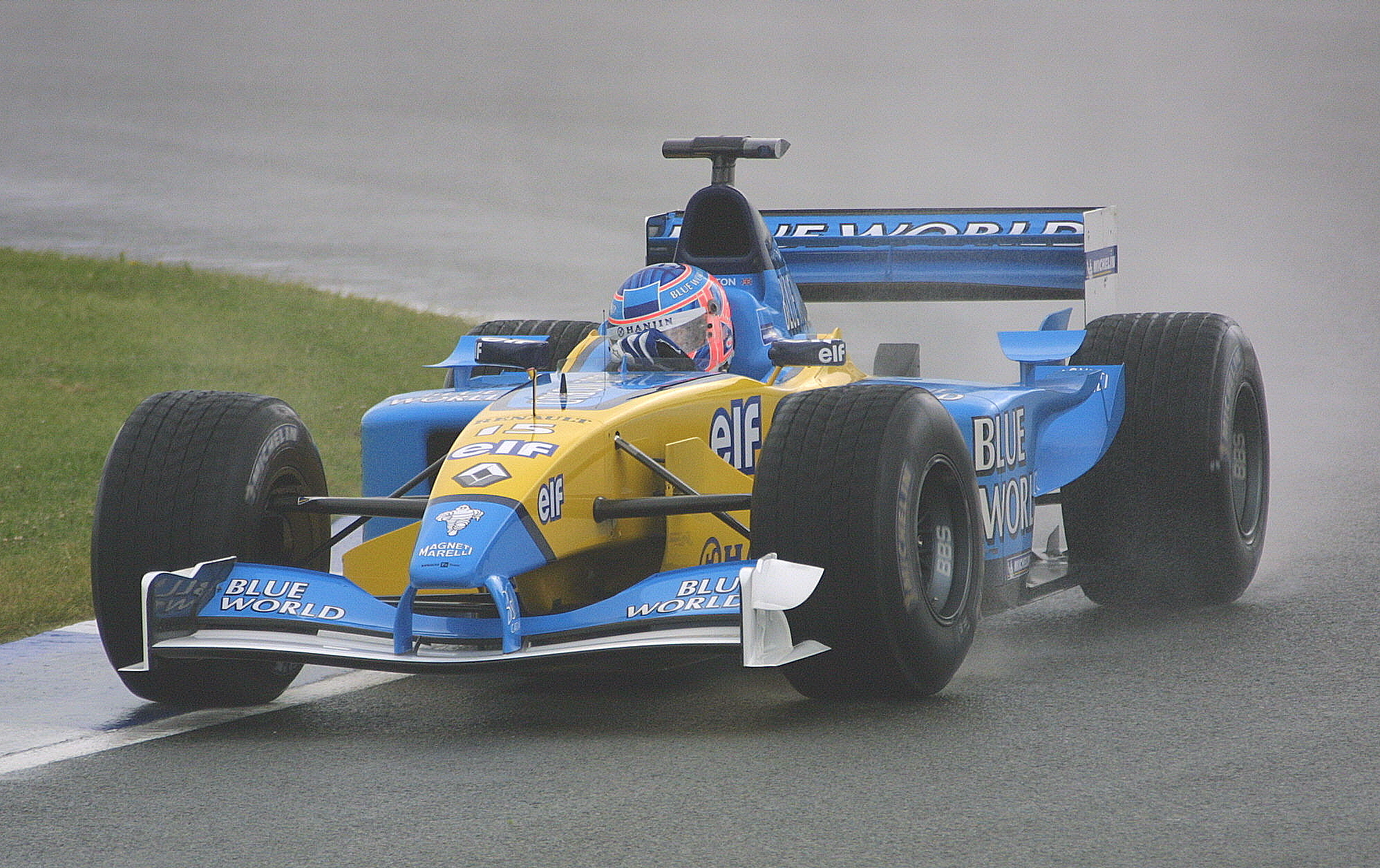
Many teams used 2002 cars in late-season tests, such as the Renault R202.

The MP4-17D first ran on 1 October 2002, at Barcelona with Wurz setting the fastest time (1:18.287). Coulthard took over the next day (1:18.453), behind Wurz in the MP4-17. On the final day, they set second and third (Wurz 1:17.129).

From 26–29 November at Valencia, Räikkönen set second (1:13.574) on day one. He led day two (1:12.335). On day three, Räikkönen set 1:10.664; Coulthard second. Coulthard led wet tyre tests on day four (1:27.430).

3–5 December at Barcelona: Wurz third (1:18.732); Paffett ninth after engine failure. Wurz and Coulthard second and third on day two. Coulthard fastest (1:15.711) on day three; Paffett eighth.

12–14 December at Jerez: Wurz second (1:21.872); Räikkönen fourth. Wurz fastest (1:20.86) on day two; Räikkönen fourth. Räikkönen led qualifying simulations (1:19.744); Wurz fourth.

=== Pre-season 2003 testing ===
14–16 January at Barcelona: Coulthard set a track record (1:15.266); Wurz sixth. McLaren drivers dominated day two (Coulthard 1:15.278). Coulthard again fastest on day three (1:15.382); Räikkönen second.

21–24 January at Valencia: Wurz fastest (1:12.732). Juan Pablo Montoya led day two; Räikkönen second, Paffett sixth. Räikkönen fastest day three (1:10.647). Räikkönen led day four (1:11.621) with MP4-18 parts.

28–30 January at Valencia: McLaren lower on day one. Wurz fastest day two (1:11.104). Coulthard led day three (1:10.977).

Schumacher called the MP4-17D competitive; Wurz believed McLaren could challenge Ferrari.

== Racing history ==
After a disappointing 2002, McLaren developed the radical MP4-18, but reliability issues delayed it. The team started with the MP4-17D.

The MP4-18 never raced, allowing the MP4-17D two early wins: Coulthard in Australia, Räikkönen in Malaysia.

In Brazil, Räikkönen led much of the rain-affected race but finished second to Giancarlo Fisichella.

McLaren led both championships initially, but the Ferrari F2003-GA and Williams FW25 challenged. The reliable MP4-17D allowed Räikkönen to contend for the drivers' title until the end, finishing second with 91 points (two behind Schumacher). McLaren placed third in constructors' with 142 points (16 behind Ferrari).

== Sponsorship and livery ==
During the off-season, McLaren renewed or signed sponsorship deals. In November 2002, Deutsche Telekom ended its sponsorship via T-Mobile, affecting McLaren and the German football team. In December, the partnership with CA Technologies was extended, providing telemetry and server protection. Additional deals included AMEC, FARAM, Bloomberg, and Sonax in January 2003.

McLaren used 'West' logos, except at the French and British Grands Prix where it used the respective drivers' first name.

== Other use ==
Sarah Fisher tested a MP4-17 at the Indianapolis Motor Speedway ahead of the 2002 United States Grand Prix.

== Complete Formula One results ==
(key) (results in bold indicate pole position, results in italics indicate fastest lap)

Year	Chassis	Engine	Tyres	Drivers	1	2	3	4	5	6	7	8	9	10	11	12	13	14	15	16	17	Points	WCC
2002	MP4-17	Mercedes-Benz FO110M 3.0 V10	M		AUS	MAL	BRA	SMR	ESP	AUT	MON	CAN	EUR	GBR	FRA	GER	HUN	BEL	ITA	USA	JPN	65	3rd
2002	MP4-17	Mercedes-Benz FO110M 3.0 V10	M	(United Kingdom) David Coulthard	Ret	Ret	3	6	3	6	1	2	Ret	10	3	5	5	4	7	3	Ret	65	3rd
2002	MP4-17	Mercedes-Benz FO110M 3.0 V10	M	(Finland) Kimi Räikkönen	3	Ret	12^{†}	Ret	Ret	Ret	Ret	4	3	Ret	2	Ret	4	Ret	Ret	Ret	3	65	3rd
2003	MP4-17D	Mercedes-Benz FO110M 3.0 V10 Mercedes-Benz FO110P 3.0 V10	M		AUS	MAL	BRA	SMR	ESP	AUT	MON	CAN	EUR	FRA	GBR	GER	HUN	ITA	USA	JPN		142	3rd
2003	MP4-17D	Mercedes-Benz FO110M 3.0 V10 Mercedes-Benz FO110P 3.0 V10	M	(United Kingdom) David Coulthard	1	Ret	4	5	Ret	5	7	Ret	15^{†}	5	5	2	5	Ret	Ret	3		142	3rd
2003	MP4-17D	Mercedes-Benz FO110M 3.0 V10 Mercedes-Benz FO110P 3.0 V10	M	(Finland) Kimi Räikkönen	3	1	2	2	Ret	2	2	6	**Ret**	4	3	Ret	2	4	**2**	2		142	3rd
