= Prodromos (neighborhood in Larnaca) =

Prodromos is a neighborhood in Larnaca, Cyprus.

One of its streets is named Prodromou Street.

Between the church (Saint John the Baptist Prodromos Church Larnaca—in Greek, Agios Ioannis Prodromos) and the city walls of Kition, lies the necropolis of Kition, which is the most extensively investigated burial ground on the island of Cyprus. The necropolis extends from the Ayios Prodromos and the area of a different church called Ayios Ioannis "Pervolia" and "Mnimata" (Northern Necropolis) to Ayios Georghios Kontos and the Chrysosotiros church (Soteros quarter), (Western Necropolis).

== Archaeological excavation ==
In 1984, part of the Kition necropolis became the subject of rescue work at the site of Agios Prodromos.
