= Chrysosotiros church =

Church in Larnaca, Cyprus

The Chrysosotiros church, also known as the Cathedral of the Holy Transfiguration of the Saviour is a church in Larnaca, Cyprus.

It is located at the Plateia Mitropoleos.

== Placement relative to the necropolis of Kition ==
The necropolis which is located outside the city walls of the kingdom of Kition extends from the Ayios Prodromos and the area of Ayios Ioannis Pervolia and Mnimata (Northern Necropolis) to Ayios Georghios Kontos and the Chrysosotiros church (Soteros quarter), (Western Necropolis).

It "is the most extensively investigated burial ground on the island of Cyprus".
