= McLaren MP4-18 =

Unraced Formula One racing car

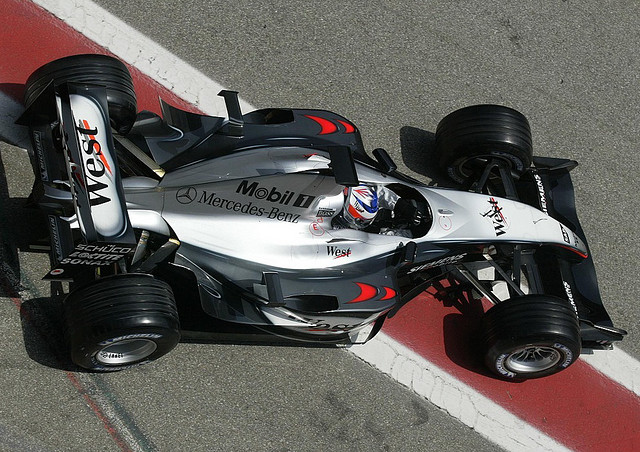
- The McLaren MP4-18 driven by Kimi Räikkönen exiting the garage for testing in Barcelona in June 2003.
- Category: Formula One
- Constructor: McLaren
- Designers: Adrian Newey; Mike Coughlan; Neil Oatley; Mario Illien (Chief Engine Designer (Ilmor-Mercedes))
- Predecessor: MP4-17D
- Successor: MP4-19

Technical specifications
- Chassis: Carbon fibre monocoque
- Suspension (front): Inboard torsion bar/damper system operated by pushrod and bell crank with a double wishbone arrangement
- Suspension (rear): As front
- Engine: Mercedes-Benz FO110P 3 litre V10 (90°) naturally aspirated , in a mid-mounted, rear-wheel-drive layout
- Transmission: McLaren 7-speed longitudinal Seamless Shift semi-automatic transmission
- Fuel: Mobil 1
- Lubricants: Mobil 1
- Tyres: Michelin; Enkei Wheels (front & rear)

Competition history
- Notable entrants: West McLaren Mercedes
- Notable drivers: (United Kingdom) David Coulthard (Finland) Kimi Räikkönen (Austria) Alexander Wurz
Races	Wins	Poles	F/Laps
0	0	0	0
- Constructors' Championships: 0
- Drivers' Championships: 0

The McLaren MP4-18 (sometimes stylised as McLaren MP4/18) is a Formula One car which was built with the intention to compete in the 2003 Formula One season. The car, designed by Adrian Newey, Mike Coughlan, and Neil Oatley, was a radical new design that incorporated numerous ideas that were still in their infancy in Formula One. Many of these ideas would be used again years later, such as the blown diffuser on the Red Bull RB6 and Red Bull RB7. Several problems with the car that revolved primarily around cooling the engine and gearbox meant that the car was stillborn and never raced.

== Background ==
The 2002 Formula One World Championship was a disappointing season for McLaren. The MP4-17 of that season was regularly off the pace of the Ferrari F2002, despite team principal Ron Dennis stating that "I think it [the F2002] is beatable." The MP4-17 was further hampered by reliability issues, with both cars finishing at only four races. Ultimately, McLaren would finish behind Williams-BMW in the Constructor's Championship, scoring only 65 points–37 less than in the 2001 season and finishing third, a place lower than in 2001.

After the 2002 season concluded, the FIA Formula One Commission met in London to decide on regulation changes. Most of these changes affected the way race weekends were structured, with some changes to testing, namely that three teams could commit to the FIA to run no more than 10 car-days of private testing between 1 March and November. The teams who committed to this limitation on private testing were provided with extra testing time on the Friday of each race weekend, from 09:00 to 11:00, with their spare car and test driver. McLaren did not commit to this choice, meaning that McLaren would have the 10 car-days of private testing, something they utilised to its maximum extent. Dennis commented that despite the lack of technical changes, the FIA should "leave the regulations alone and we will catch up and hopefully surpass the performance of Ferrari. If you change the rules, you are opening the envelope again and that will make it more difficult – not less difficult – to arrive at a point of having competitive racing."

McLaren also decided to delay the debut of the MP4-18, with former McLaren mechanic Marc Priestley saying in an exclusive interview with The Race, "If we were going to catch Ferrari, we'd have to go way beyond what people considered normal." A shadow team working under Neil Oatley were to develop McLaren's interim car, an evolution of the 2002 car named the MP4-17D. At the season opener in Melbourne, David Coulthard took the final win of his career with the MP4-17D. After the race, Dennis commented regarding the MP4-18 saying that "I think it will be a good step and a match for the new Ferrari, so we'll be pushing hard on that. In the meantime if we can get results like this we will be delighted."

== Design ==
The MP4-18 carried over the newly introduced concept of twin-keel suspension from the MP4-17, bringing on experienced twin-keel specialist Mike Coughlan following the liquidation of the Arrows team. The idea of twin-keel suspension was still in its infancy in Formula One, being first introduced in 2001 by Sauber designer Sergio Rinland. Other changes included positioning the exhausts within the diffuser in order to create a "blown diffuser" effect; drastically tighter rear packaging (a commonality on modern cars); a longer, narrower nose that dropped down; and narrower sidepods.

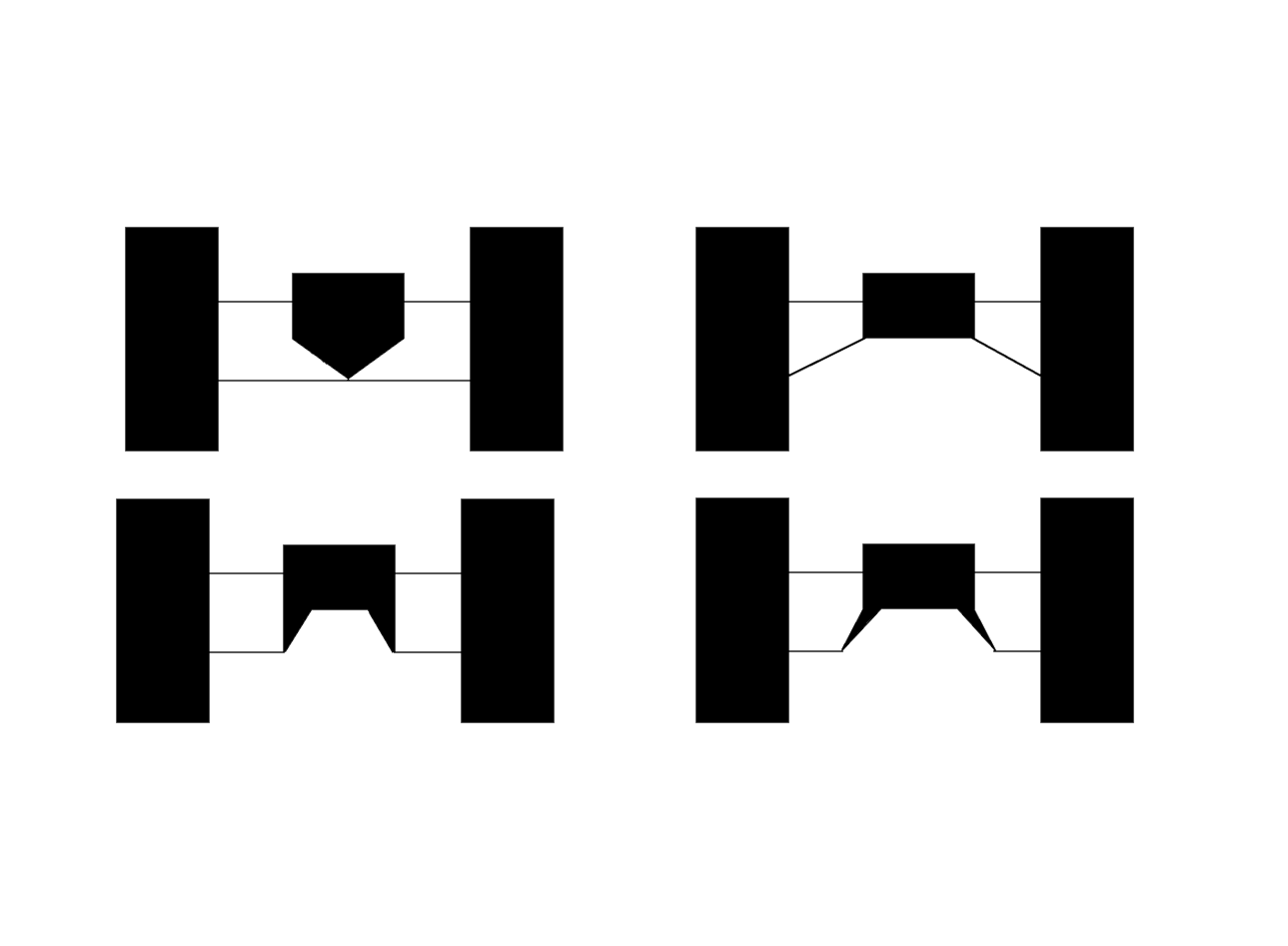
The various keel types in Formula One, the top left being a single keel arrangement in which the lower suspension arm is attached to a single piece of bodywork. The top right is a zero-keel car; the bottom left is the typical twin-keel car; and the bottom right is McLaren's interpretation of the twin-keel.

Alongside the Williams FW25 of that year, the twin-keel configuration was combined with a "waved wing". The latter acted in a similar fashion to a diffuser, creating a low-pressure area below the wing, sucking the nose and the front end of the car to the ground. This was a first for teams and for Formula One, and both teams developed the concept independently. The front wing and nosecone were also designed in a way that the front wing was the first structure to disturb oncoming air, meaning that the structure of the nosecone would play a significantly smaller role in aerodynamics.

In contrast, Ferrari stuck with the high, protruding nosecone philosophy. The narrow sidepod and tight rear packaging philosophy was borrowed from the F2002, which had noticeably narrower sidepods and rear packaging than any car of the 2002 season. The MP4-18 had sidepods that curved down significantly at the rear, whereas the MP4-17 had a relatively smooth and mild round-off. In order to achieve the narrow sidepods, McLaren ultimately sacrificed the side crash structure, most likely resulting in the failure of the FIA-mandated side crash tests.

In Adrian Newey's memoir, How to Build a Car, he reflected that the MP4-18's problems stemmed from the shape of the chassis. He wrote that "the problem was related to the shape of the chassis and the front of the sidepod overloading the vortex that forms off a delta wing just in front of the sidepod, causing the vortex to be unstable and burst in certain conditions. The problem could be alleviated by trimming the wing, but this lost downforce." In order to resolve it Newey called for a chassis redesign, an almost insurmountable task in the middle of a season.

== Engine and transmission ==
In the early 2000s, Ron Dennis adapted a mantra of pace over reliability, saying that he "would rather have a fast unreliable car than a slow reliable car." Changes to the points system for the 2003 season meant that there was greater emphasis on reliability, something with which Mercedes-Benz was struggling since the ban of beryllium.

Until 2001, Mercedes-Benz used an aluminium-beryllium alloy to line their engine cylinders and a beryllium alloy in their pistons. Beryllium, despite its steep cost, had much superior mechanical properties compared to steel and copper, being stiffer and boasting superior heat transfer, respectively. This allowed Mercedes to build an engine with a longer stroke yet still rev as high as the Ferrari engine due to the increased elasticity of beryllium alloys, producing more power. During the 1999 season, Ferrari technical director Ross Brawn was quoted regarding the Mercedes engine, "With a longer stroke, Mercedes reaches the same revs we do. God knows how they do it." On 6 October 1999, the FIA moved to ban beryllium from engines beginning in 2001, citing safety reasons (as beryllium is an IARC group 1 Carcinogen). Peugeot and Mercedes were the only manufacturers who were using beryllium at the time, with the latter impacted the most. Adrian Newey was quoted as saying that the "power we [McLaren] had in 2001 was no more than the power we had in 1998. We obviously need to improve on that."

Mercedes-Benz would design a completely new engine for the MP4-18, an evolution of the FO series, dubbed the P spec. Estimates for how much power the engine produced ranged from 870 bhp to 888 bhp. The engine was mounted very low in the chassis, so as to lower the centre of gravity. McLaren mechanics described working on the engine as a nightmare; every time the engine was disconnected from the chassis, it would damage the car.

The gearbox was also new: a titanium gearbox with casing bonded to carbon fibre parts, which resulted in a reduced weight compared to the MP4-17D. This gearbox, like the engine, proved treacherous to handle, being so fragile that there was uncertainty whether or not it would work after being taken out and put back in.

== Testing ==
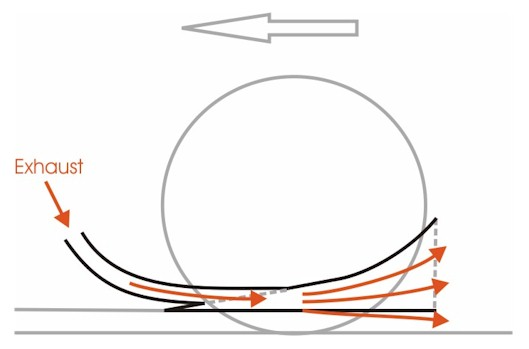
The blown diffuser worked by directing the exhaust gases through the rear diffuser, speeding up the air passing through & generating more downforce. The arrow above the wheel indicates the direction the car is travelling.

At the 2003 San Marino Grand Prix, Ron Dennis was asked on when the MP4-18 would debut, answering cryptically, "No sooner than Canada and no later than Silverstone." Following the debut of Ferrari's F2003-GA at the next grand prix in Barcelona, Coulthard commented that, "We have to have the new car out as soon as possible. That's the only way I believe we can continue to challenge for the Championship." Norbert Haug, then Vice-President of Mercedes-Benz, commented in June, saying that "I have never seen a more impressive car [the MP4-18]."

The effects of the radical design changes were immediately clear at the MP4-18's test debut at the Circuit Paul Ricard. Straight away, the car faced overheating problems due to the small area within the sidepods (in which the radiators are situated) that did not allow for the decompression of heated gas or air. This was quickly amended in the second test, with two holes punched at the rear of each sidepod, just below the "Mercedes" logo on the car. However, this did not resolve their problems, with the Mercedes engine proving to be delicate and requiring more cooling than expected. The cooling problems were so severe that Marc Priestly mentioned the car was coming back from every test "on fire", requiring the constant presence of fire extinguishers in the pit box.

At another test in Jerez, McLaren test driver Alexander Wurz suffered a large shunt due to floor delamination, the cause of which was never determined. He walked away unharmed. At the Barcelona tests in June, Kimi Räikkönen did not fare well either, shunting at the final turn, bruising his knee and writing that chassis off. Räikkönen was said to have vowed to never drive the car again, according to Priestly. Wurz successfully tested the MP4-18 for 330 km (205 mi) in Austria; however, when he came back into the pits it was determined that the internal temperature of the gearbox had reached 120 °C (248 °F), causing delamination.

Later on in the 2003 season, it looked more and more apparent that the MP4-18 would never see the light of day, with Dennis commenting in August that "We've got a full test after Hungary – a comprehensive test with four cars, most likely two in Monza and two in Barcelona – and we'll make the choice after that. But it's leaning more and more towards continuing with the MP4-17D." The car was never mentioned again for the rest of the season.

== Legacy ==
The MP4-18, despite its drawbacks, was the foundation for the MP4-19 which raced in the 2004 season. Adrian Newey said that the MP4-19 was identical to the MP4-18; in many ways it was, carrying over the narrow nosecone and slim sidepods. However, the Mercedes-Benz engine still remained problematic, with McLaren encountering reliability issues until the introduction of the MP4-19B upgrade at the French Grand Prix. Newey believed these problems could have been resolved had he not been outvoted in a decision as to whether to retain the MP4-18's design or evolve the design further, the latter of which he was intent on.

Newey's failure to convince the team that the MP4-18 needed a new chassis meant that the team's 2004 season got off to a disastrous start. Following a string of poor performances, Newey eventually prevailed, introducing a new chassis with the MP4-19B, giving the team their only win of the season at the 2004 Belgian Grand Prix. Newey, less angered so by the performance of the car, felt that the vote had essentially vetoed his position as technical director. This was another fracture in what already was a fragile relationship with team boss Ron Dennis. It later came to light that following Newey's Jaguar F1 tussle a few years earlier that Ron Dennis engineered a change in McLaren's management structure to ensure that such a key figure leaving could not devastate the team again. Newey's dissatisfaction eventually resulted him announcing in November 2005 that he was joining Red Bull Racing for the 2006 season.

Motorsport writer Edd Straw opined in an article in 2023 that the car was too ambitious for the time, and that McLaren-Mercedes' and Newey's obsession in perfecting the MP4-18's design for so long and prioritising its development over the MP4/17D's for much of the season was one of factors that cost Kimi Räikkönen the 2003 Drivers' Championship.

For many years, the third chassis made, MP4-18A-03, was on display at Donington Park in the Donington Grand Prix Collection with a wider nose shape more akin to the later MP4-20. It had 'Alex' in place of West in recognition to both the ban on tobacco advertising and also due to Alexander Wurz being the test driver. It currently resides at the McLaren Technology Centre in a secluded room where they store most of their collection of old racing cars. English television personality Jodie Kidd was shown it in a visit to the MTC in 2021.

== See also ==
- Toyota TF101, which was used solely for testing in the 2001 season.
- Prost AP05, another car which never took part in a race.
