= Peter Prodromou =

Greek-Cypriot Formula One designer

- Born: 14 January 1969 (age 57); London, England
- Education: Imperial College London (BS)
- Occupation: Aerodynamicist
- Years active: 1991-present
- Employer: McLaren
- Known for: Formula One aerodynamicist
- Title: Technical Director (Aerodynamics)

Peter Prodromou (Greek: Πέτρος Προδρόμου; born 14 January 1969) is a Greek-Cypriot aerodynamicist and engineer currently serving as the Technical Director for Aerodynamics for McLaren Formula One team.

== Biography ==
Prodromou graduated Imperial College London with a degree in aeronautical engineering before joining McLaren's design office in 1991, later becoming the team's chief aerodynamicist. He left the team in 2006—alongside Adrian Newey—for Red Bull Racing. Prodromou worked as Head of Aerodynamics for the team until his departure in 2014.

In late 2014, he rejoined McLaren as Chief Engineer, following a contract dispute with Red Bull. In 2017, Prodromou became the team's chief technical officer, responsible for aerodynamics. In 2023, as part of an organisational change, Prodromu was promoted to the new role of Technical Director (Aerodynamics) leading the Aerodynamics Department. In February 2025, Prodromou's contract at McLaren was extended on a multi-year agreement.
