= Neil Oatley =

British motor racing engineer (born 1954)

- Born: 12 June 1954 (age 72)

Neil Oatley (born 12 June 1954) is a British design and development director in Formula One teams.

== Career ==
Born in Britain, Oatley graduated from Loughborough University in 1976 with an automotive engineering degree. He worked briefly outside motor racing before joining the Williams team in 1977. There he became one of many young engineers to have worked alongside Patrick Head early in their careers before moving on to other organisations. Oatley worked as a draughtsman before becoming a race engineer for both Clay Regazzoni and Carlos Reutemann.

In 1984 Oatley was recruited by Carl Haas to work on the FORCE F1 project, but the results were poor, and the team withdrew from Formula One in 1986.

Oatley joined the McLaren team shortly after leaving FORCE and worked alongside John Barnard in the design office. After Gordon Murray replaced Barnard as technical director, Oatley was put in charge of the design of the naturally aspirated car for 1989—Steve Nichols having been appointed chief designer of the 1988 chassis—and remained chief designer after Murray moved to the new McLaren road car project. His cars secured titles in 1989, 1990, 1991, 1998 and 1999.

Oatley continued to work as chief designer at McLaren until 2003, when he became executive director of engineering. Oatley acts as a technical advisor on the McLaren MCL-HY project.
