= McLaren MP4-22 =

Formula One Car for 2007 season

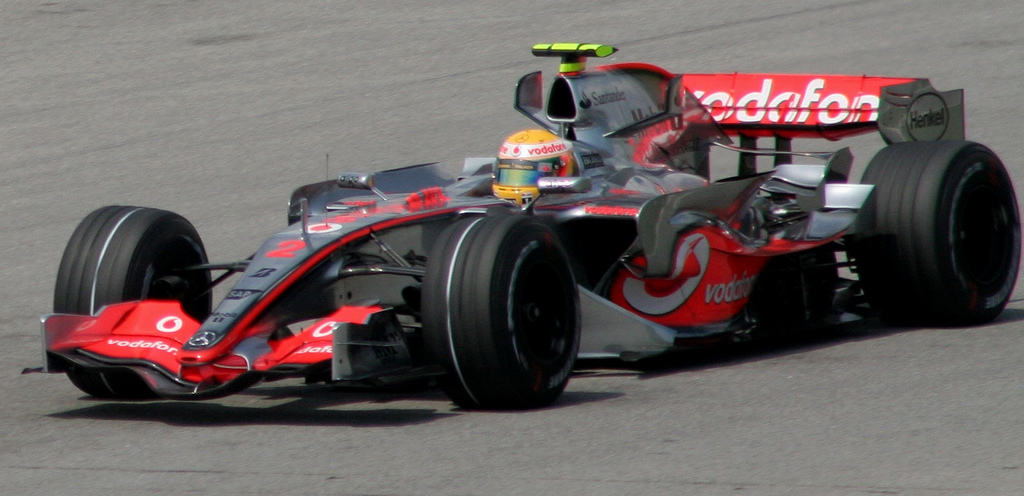
- Lewis Hamilton driving the MP4-22 at the 2007 Malaysian Grand Prix
- Category: Formula One
- Constructor: McLaren
- Designers: Neil Oatley (Executive Engineer); Paddy Lowe (Engineering Director); Pat Fry (Chief Engineer); Mike Coughlan (Chief Designer); Mark Williams (Head of Vehicle Engineering); Simon Lacey (Head of Aerodynamics); Doug McKiernan (Chief Aerodynamicist); Markus Duesmann (Engineering Director - Mercedes); Axel Wendorff (Chief Engineer, Engine - Mercedes)
- Predecessor: MP4-21
- Successor: MP4-23

Technical specifications
- Chassis: Moulded carbon fibre/aluminium honeycomb composite incorporating front and side-impact structures
- Suspension (front): Adjustable double wish-bone arrangement
- Suspension (rear): As front
- Length: 4,630 mm (182 in)
- Width: 1,800 mm (71 in)
- Height: 950 mm (37 in)
- Wheelbase: 3,100 mm (122 in)
- Engine: Mercedes-Benz FO 108T 2.4 litres (146 cubic inches) V8 naturally-aspirated mid-engined and longitudinally-mounted
- Transmission: McLaren 7-speed + 1 reverse sequential seamless semi-automatic paddle shift with epicyclic differential and multi-plate limited-slip clutch
- Battery: GS Yuasa
- Power: 810 hp @ 19,000 rpm
- Weight: 605 kg (1,334 lb)
- Fuel: Mobil High Performance unleaded
- Lubricants: Mobil 1
- Tyres: Bridgestone Potenza 4-line grooved slicks and treaded intermediate and wet tyres Enkei 13" magnesium racing wheels

Competition history
- Notable entrants: Vodafone McLaren Mercedes
- Notable drivers: 1. (Spain) Fernando Alonso; 2. (United Kingdom) Lewis Hamilton
- Debut: 2007 Australian Grand Prix
- First win: 2007 Malaysian Grand Prix
- Last win: 2007 Japanese Grand Prix
- Last event: 2007 Brazilian Grand Prix
Races	Wins	Poles	F/Laps
17	8	8	5
- Constructors' Championships: 0
- Drivers' Championships: 0

The McLaren MP4-22 is a Formula One racing car that was constructed by the Vodafone McLaren Mercedes team to compete in the 2007 Formula One World Championship. The chassis was designed by Paddy Lowe, Neil Oatley, Pat Fry, Mike Coughlan and Simon Lacey, with Andy Cowell and Markus Duesmann designing the bespoke Mercedes-Benz engine. The car was revealed in testing at Circuit de Valencia in Spain on 15 January 2007, and was driven by double World Champion Fernando Alonso and debutant Lewis Hamilton.

The MP4-22 proved to be one of the most competitive cars of the season, with Alonso and Hamilton achieving four victories each. However, a fierce rivalry between the two drivers, combined with the 2007 Formula One espionage controversy, resulted in McLaren losing both championships to Scuderia Ferrari Marlboro.

This was the first McLaren Formula One ran with Bridgestone tyres since the MP4-16 in 2001.

== Development ==
In its design philosophy behind the new car, the team says the MP4-22 features "some advanced engineering concepts" and "novel aerodynamic solutions".

On 17 January 2007, Fernando Alonso completed a shakedown test in the Ricardo Tormo circuit in Valencia, setting the fastest lap time of 1:12.050.

At testing in Catalunya on 1 May 2007, Pedro de la Rosa tested the car with a new unique front wing design that would see extensive use throughout the remainder of the season. It featured a thin carbon fibre wing that spanned from the top of each end plate, bypassing the nosecone by arching over it. This new wing subsequently made its racing debut at the Spanish Grand Prix. The wing was deemed surplus to requirements during the 2007 Italian Grand Prix due to the high speed/low drag characteristics required.

As part of new FIA rules for the 2008 season which included banning driver aids via the introduction of a standard ECU for all teams, the MP4-22 was the last McLaren Formula One car to use traction control.

== 2007 season ==
The MP4-22 proved to be far more competitive than its similar-looking predecessor and McLaren scored eight victories, compared to a winless 2006 season. The car proved to be the most reliable car of the season, with no mechanical retirements in any race, and one of the two fastest cars on the field (along with the Ferraris). The low downforce package of the MP4-22 was extremely competitive. McLaren, with the aid of their improved car, scored as many team points in the first half of 2007 as they had done during the entire year in 2006. However the team's season was marred by a fierce rivalry between its drivers Hamilton and Alonso, as well as a fall out between Alonso and the team's management. This contributed to both drivers eventually losing the championship by one point to Ferrari's Kimi Räikkönen, despite having led the championship for most of the season and Lewis Hamilton having a 17 point lead with 2 races to go. McLaren led the Constructors' Championship from the start of the season until the Italian Grand Prix, after which they were excluded from the championship due to allegations that the MP4-22 used data obtained from rivals Ferrari. This led the MP4-22 failing to win either championship despite its competitiveness.

The McLaren race drivers completed 5,340 racing kilometres in the 2007 season, 45% of which were whilst leading a race. The MP4-22 also completed 27,150 kilometres in testing; Fernando Alonso, Lewis Hamilton, Pedro de la Rosa, Gary Paffett and Jamie Green completed 8,277 km, 7,714 km, 8,277 km, 2,842 km and 28 km respectively.

The MP4-22 was succeeded by the McLaren MP4-23.

== Sponsorship and livery ==
Much like with its predecessor, the MP4-22 turned out in the same chrome livery and red accents; with a title sponsor from the telecommunication company Vodafone. Aigo and Santander joined as a team's new main sponsor while SAP, Hilton, Henkel and Schüco were retained. Mutua Madrileña was joined as well as it was Alonso's personal sponsor.

In France, the Johnnie Walker logos were removed due to alcohol advertising being outlawed. At the Turkish Grand Prix, the Johnnie Walker logo was replaced by Diageo.

== Other ==
Prodrive planned to use the McLaren MP4-22 car and Mercedes engines, had it been able to join in 2008.

== Gallery ==
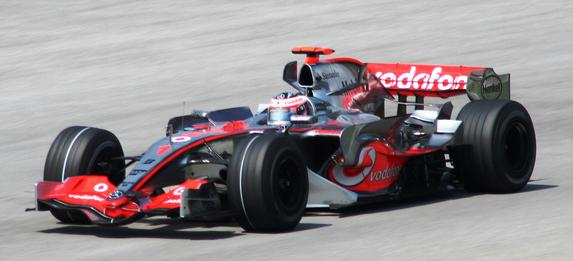
The MP4-22 won its second race in the hands of Fernando Alonso.

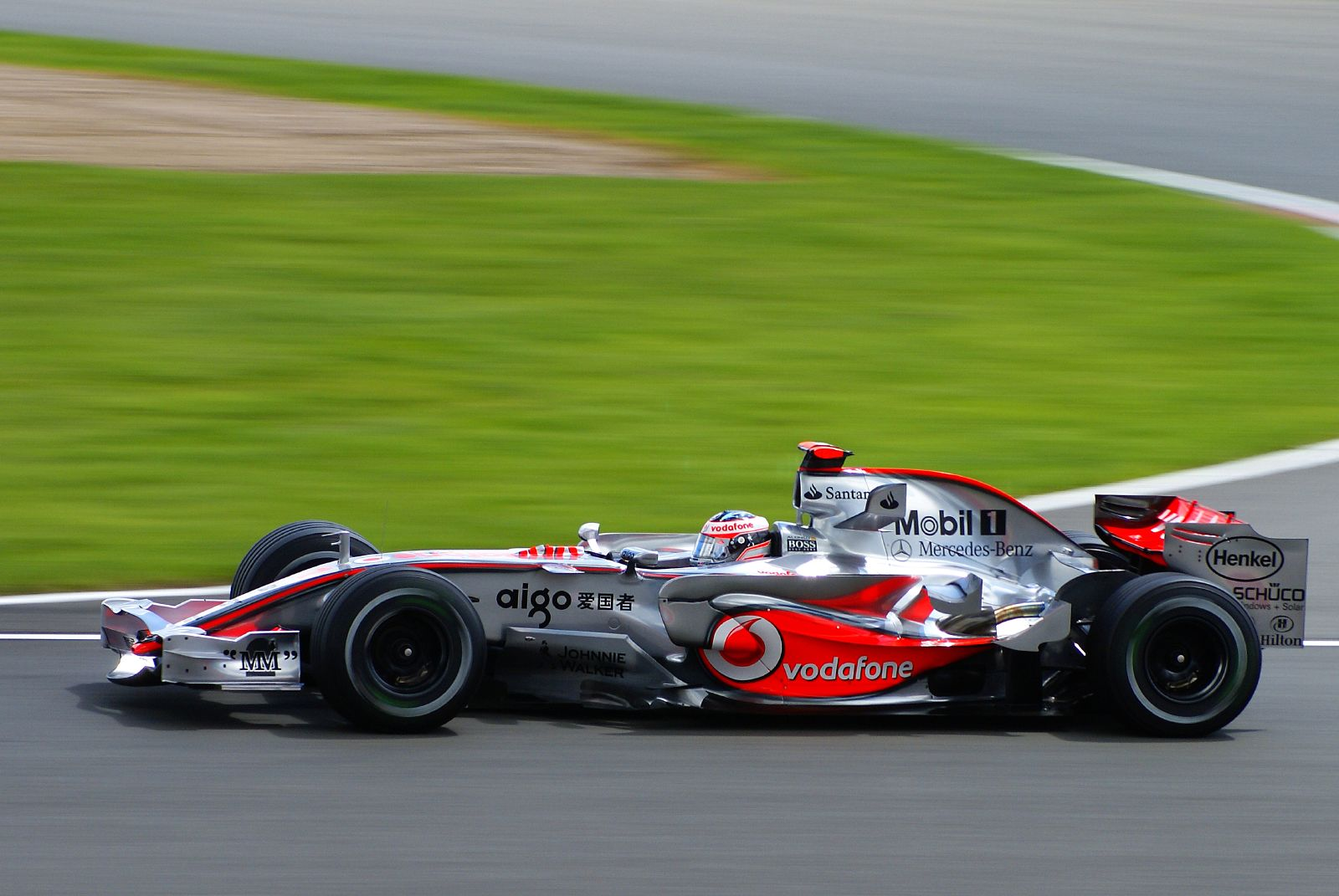
Alonso driving the MP4-22 at the 2007 British Grand Prix.

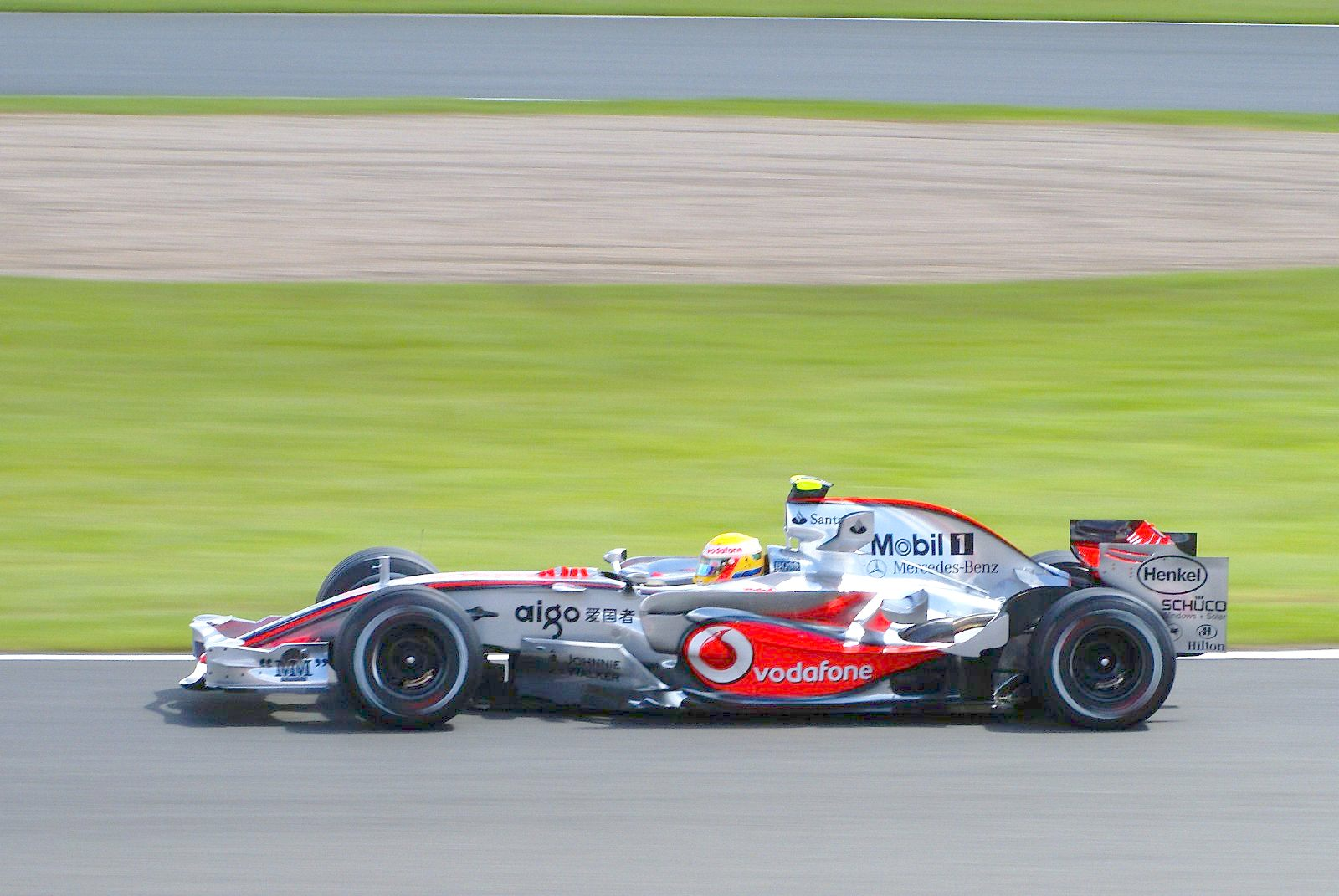
Hamilton driving the MP4-22 at the British Grand Prix.

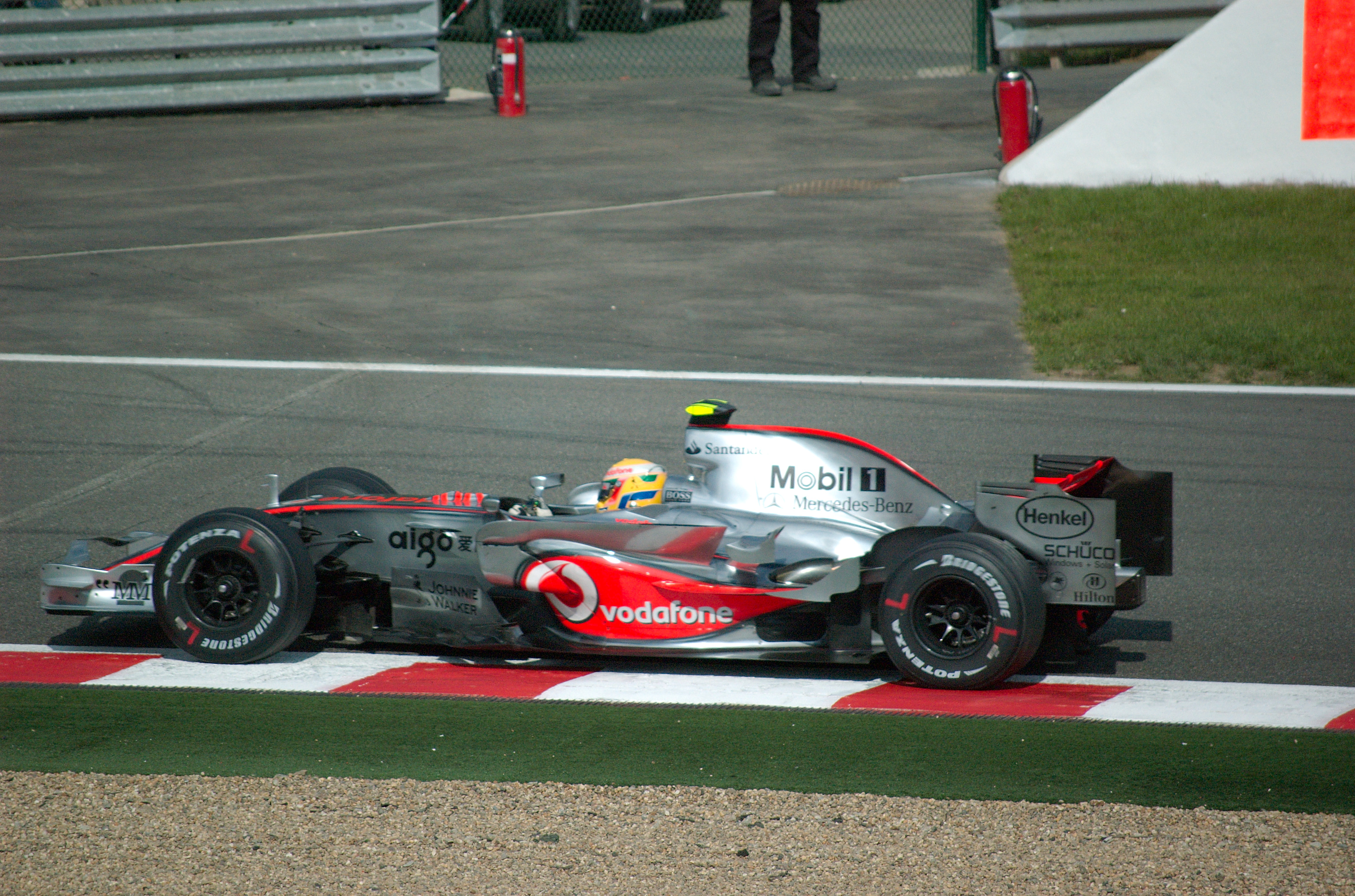
Hamilton driving the MP4-22 at the Belgian Grand Prix.

== Complete Formula One results ==
(key) (results in bold indicate pole position; results in italics indicate fastest lap)

Year	Team	Engine	Tyres	Drivers	1	2	3	4	5	6	7	8	9	10	11	12	13	14	15	16	17	Points	WCC
2007	Vodafone McLaren Mercedes	Mercedes FO 108T 2.4 V8	**B**		AUS	MAL	BHR	ESP	MON	CAN	USA	FRA	GBR	EUR	HUN	TUR	ITA	BEL	JPN	CHN	BRA	**DSQ‡**	**EX***
2007	Vodafone McLaren Mercedes	Mercedes FO 108T 2.4 V8	**B**	(Spain) Fernando Alonso	2	1	5	3	**1**	7	2	7	2	1	4†	3	**1**	3	Ret	2	3	**DSQ‡**	**EX***
2007	Vodafone McLaren Mercedes	Mercedes FO 108T 2.4 V8	**B**	(United Kingdom) Lewis Hamilton	3	2	2	2	2	**1**	**1**	3	**3**	9	**1**†	5	2	4	**1**	**Ret**	7	**DSQ‡**	**EX***

† McLaren did not receive points for the constructors' championship in Hungary.

* McLaren scored 218 points between both drivers, but they were not counted due to the 2007 espionage controversy.

== Notes and references ==
Awards
Preceded by Renault R26	Autosport; Racing Car Of The Year; 2007	Succeeded by McLaren MP4-23
