= McLaren MP4-24 =

2009 Formula One racing car

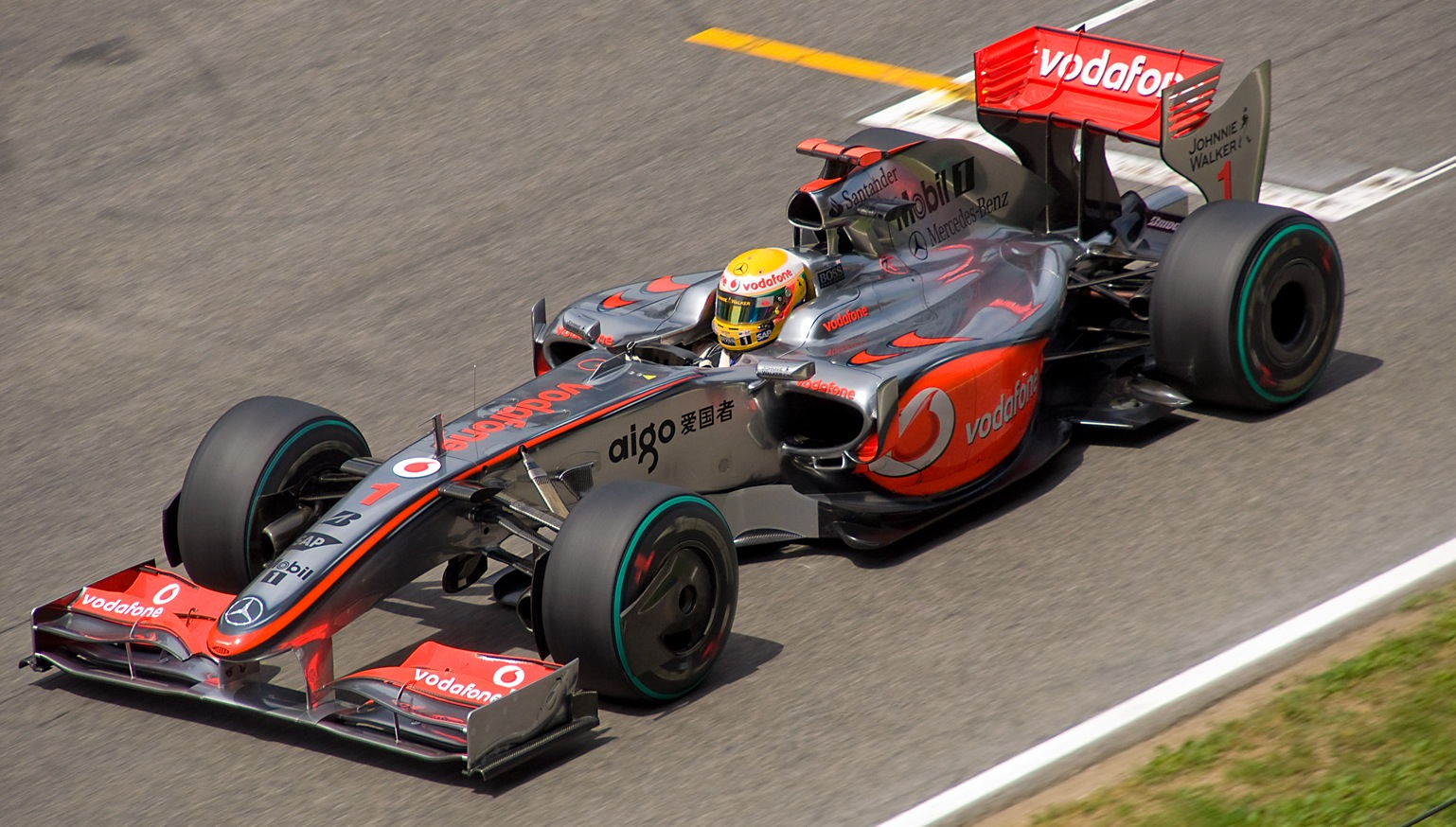
- Lewis Hamilton driving the MP4-24 at the Spanish Grand Prix
- Category: Formula One
- Constructor: McLaren Racing
- Designers: Neil Oatley (Executive Engineer); Paddy Lowe (Engineering Director); Pat Fry (Chief Engineer); Mark Williams (Head of Vehicle Engineering); Andrew Bailey (Head of Vehicle Design); Rob Taylor (Principal Design Engineer); Simon Lacey (Head of Aerodynamics); Doug McKiernan (Chief Aerodynamicist); John Sutton (KERS Project Leader); Andy Cowell (Engineering Director - Mercedes); Axel Wendorff (Chief Engineer, Engine - Mercedes)
- Predecessor: McLaren MP4-23
- Successor: McLaren MP4-25

Technical specifications
- Chassis: Moulded carbon fibre / aluminium honeycomb composite incorporating front and side impact structures and integral safety fuel cell.
- Suspension (front): Inboard torsion bar/damper system operated by pushrod and bell crank with a double wishbone arrangement
- Suspension (rear): As front.
- Engine: Mercedes-Benz FO 108W 2.4 L (146 cu in) V8. Naturally aspirated, 18,000 RPM limited, with KERS, mid-mounted.
- Transmission: McLaren 7-speed + 1 reverse sequential seamless semi-automatic paddle shift with epicyclic differential and multi-plate limited slip clutch
- Fuel: Mobil High Performance Unleaded (5.75% bio fuel)
- Lubricants: Mobil 1
- Tyres: Bridgestone Potenza; Enkei wheels

Competition history
- Notable entrants: Vodafone McLaren Mercedes
- Notable drivers: 1. (United Kingdom) Lewis Hamilton; 2. (Finland) Heikki Kovalainen
- Debut: 2009 Australian Grand Prix
- First win: 2009 Hungarian Grand Prix
- Last win: 2009 Singapore Grand Prix
- Last event: 2009 Abu Dhabi Grand Prix
Races	Wins	Podiums	Poles	F/Laps
17	2	5	4	0

The McLaren MP4-24 is a Formula One racing car used by McLaren-Mercedes during the 2009 Formula One season. The chassis was designed by Paddy Lowe, Neil Oatley, Pat Fry, Andrew Bailey and Simon Lacey with Andy Cowell designing the bespoke Mercedes-Benz engine which, although also used by Force India and Brawn GP, was designed with the intention of fitting in the chassis of the MP4-24.

== Overview ==
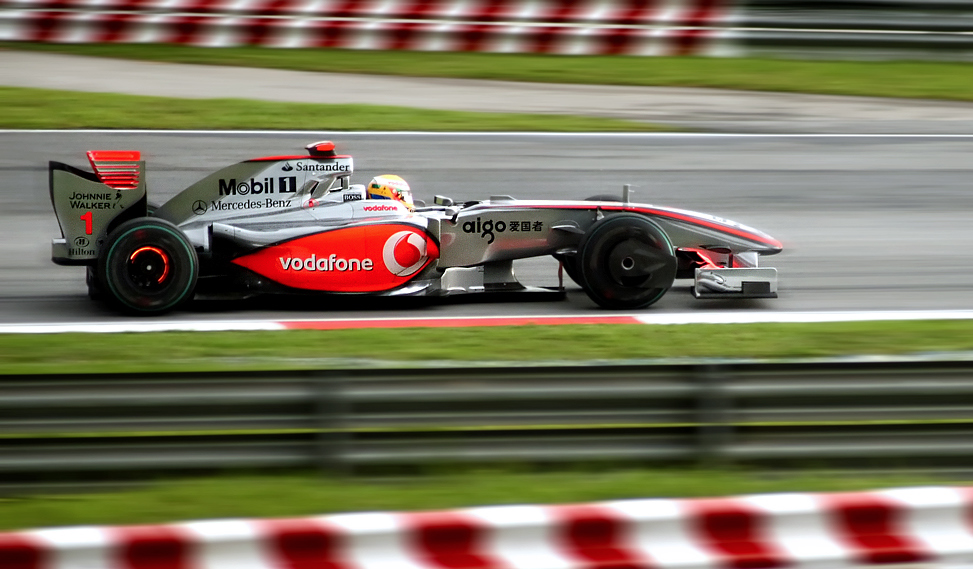
Hamilton driving the MP4-24 at the Malaysian Grand Prix

It was revealed at McLaren's headquarters in Woking, United Kingdom on 16 January 2009. The following day, team test driver Pedro de la Rosa gave the MP4-24 its first test run at the Autódromo Internacional do Algarve.

In testing, the MP4-24 was proven slower than its rivals due to aerodynamic problems, with Lewis Hamilton and Heikki Kovalainen repeatedly at the bottom of the timesheets. The car came under much scrutiny from team members and other critics alike. Martin Whitmarsh, McLaren team principal, said the team "had not done a good enough job". He also went on to say "We have an underdeveloped car, we do not have sufficient aerodynamic downforce and we would like to focus on rectifying that as quickly as we can."

The car was originally designed with a conventional diffuser. The MP4-24 was fitted with a modified diffuser based on similar principles to the double-decker designs at the Malaysian Grand Prix after the FIA confirmed that such components were legal, after several teams had asked the FIA to clarify the matter.

After the British Grand Prix, the midpoint of the 2009 season, McLaren had scored just 13 Constructor's World Championship points with Hamilton scoring 9 and Kovalainen 4. By the same point in 2008 they had scored 72 points and Hamilton was jointly leading the Driver's World Championship with Felipe Massa on 48 points. Hamilton had made public calls to scrap the car and a former team owner turned commentator Eddie Jordan had proclaimed it as "possibly the worst car McLaren have ever designed".

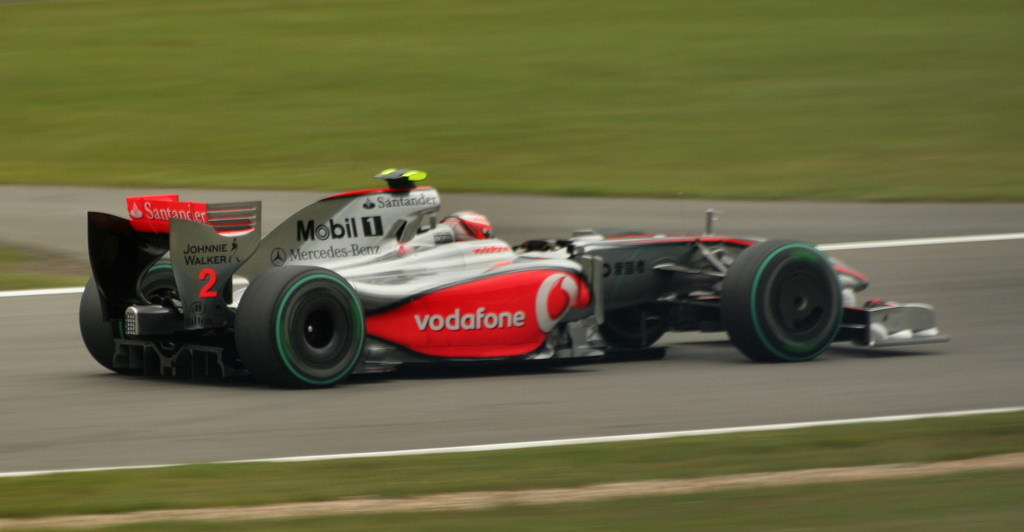
Kovalainen took eighth at the German Grand Prix

The impact of upgrades to Hamilton's car for the next race at the Nürburgring for the German Grand Prix were positive and saw him qualify in 5th, with Kovalainen in 6th place. However, a collision with Mark Webber's Red Bull at the first corner punctured a tyre and damaged the undertray of the car which effectively ended any chance of competing for a points scoring position, and Hamilton finished the race in 18th and last place with Kovalainen scraping into the points in 8th.

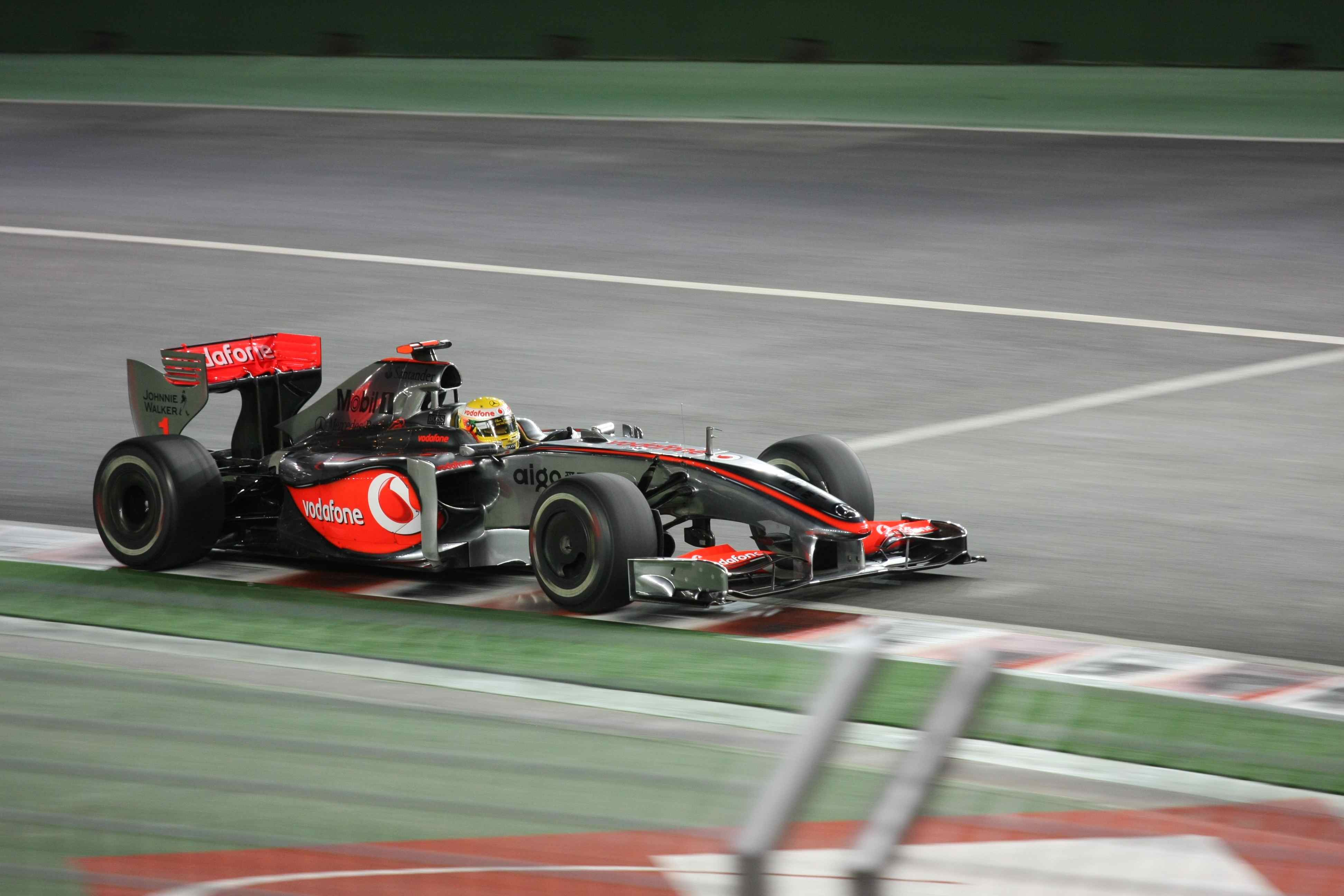
Hamilton took home the team's second and last victory of the season at the Singapore Grand Prix

There was a 2-week break between Germany and the next round at Hungary by which time both cars had been upgraded to the new specification. Again, the weekend started well with both cars showing good pace and Hamilton qualified 4th and Kovalainen 6th. This time Hamilton was able to demonstrate the true effectiveness of the upgraded car by winning the race in convincing style. Acknowledging his previous remarks live on the BBC after the race, Eddie Jordan expressed his amazement at how McLaren had managed to turn the car into a race winner. Despite disappointing results at Spa and Monza, Hamilton claimed his second win of the year under the lights of Singapore's Marina Bay from pole position, and a pair of third places in Suzuka and São Paulo helped McLaren clinch third place in the Constructors championship with 71 points, pipping rivals Ferrari by 1 point.

The MP4-24 was also the last McLaren Formula One car to hold main factory works team status to Mercedes-Benz, as McLaren were demoted to Mercedes F1's customer team in 2010 following Mercedes-Benz and Daimler AG's buyout of Brawn GP in late 2009, and thus the Mercedes-Benz F1 full-factory constructor team returned to Formula One in 2010. The MP4-24 was succeeded by the MP4-25.

== Sponsorship and livery ==
The livery was similar to the two previous seasons; chrome paint and red accents from their title sponsor Vodafone. This was the final year for Santander as they would move to Ferrari for the following season.

At the Turkish and Abu Dhabi Grands Prix, the Johnnie Walker logo was replaced by Diageo.

== Complete Formula One results ==
(key) (results in bold indicate pole position; results in italics indicate fastest lap)

Year	Entrant	Engine	Tyres	Drivers	1	2	3	4	5	6	7	8	9	10	11	12	13	14	15	16	17	Points	WCC
2009	Vodafone McLaren Mercedes	Mercedes FO108W V8	**B**		AUS	MAL^{‡}	CHN	BHR	ESP	MON	TUR	GBR	GER	HUN	EUR	BEL	ITA	SIN	JPN	BRA	ABU	**71**	**3rd**
2009	Vodafone McLaren Mercedes	Mercedes FO108W V8	**B**	Hamilton	DSQ	7	6	4	9	12	13	16	18	1	**2**	Ret	**12**^{†}	**1**	3	3	**Ret**	**71**	**3rd**
2009	Vodafone McLaren Mercedes	Mercedes FO108W V8	**B**	Kovalainen	Ret	Ret	5	12	Ret	Ret	14	Ret	8	5	4	6	6	7	11	12	11	**71**	**3rd**

^{†} Driver failed to finish, but was classified as they had completed 90% of the race distance.
^{‡} Half points awarded as less than 75% of race distance completed.

== Statistics on the KERS system ==
- McLaren became the first team to win a GP using a KERS-equipped car when Hamilton won the Hungarian Grand Prix.
- At the European Grand Prix, Hamilton became the first driver to take pole position with a KERS car; his teammate, Kovalainen, qualified second. This was also the first instance of an all-KERS front row.
- McLaren used the KERS system in all races except the British Grand Prix.
