= McLaren MP4-23 =

Formula One racing car for 2008 season

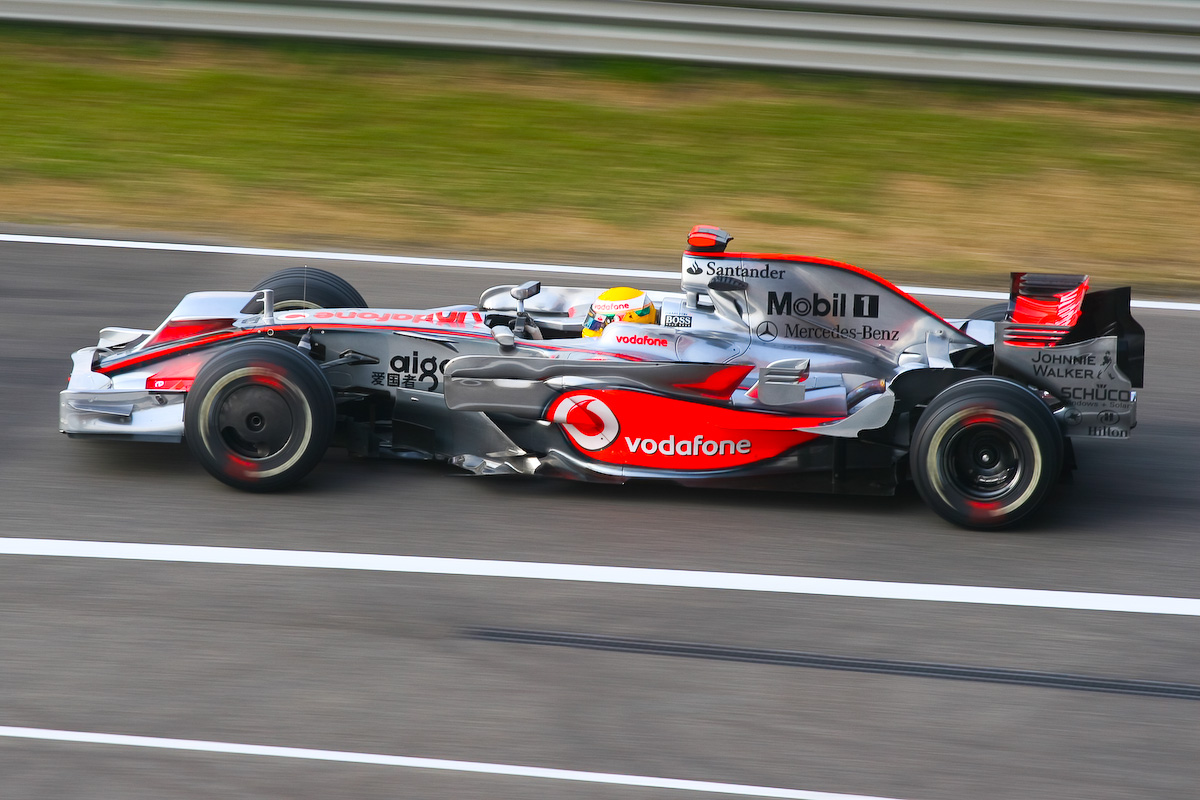
- Lewis Hamilton driving the MP4-23 at the 2008 Chinese Grand Prix
- Category: Formula One
- Constructor: McLaren
- Designers: Neil Oatley (Executive Engineer); Paddy Lowe (Engineering Director); Tim Goss (Chief Engineer); Mark Williams (Head of Vehicle Engineering); Rob Taylor (Principal Design Engineer); Simon Lacey (Head of Aerodynamics); Doug McKiernan (Chief Aerodynamicist); Andy Cowell (Engineering Director - Mercedes); Axel Wendorff (Chief Engineer, Engine - Mercedes)
- Predecessor: MP4-22
- Successor: MP4-24

Technical specifications
- Chassis: Moulded carbon fibre/aluminium honeycomb composite incorporating front and side impact structures
- Suspension (front): Adjustable double wish-bone arrangement
- Suspension (rear): Adjustable double wish-bone arrangement
- Length: 4,630 mm (182 in)
- Width: 1,800 mm (71 in)
- Height: 950 mm (37 in)
- Wheelbase: 3,100 mm (122 in)
- Engine: Mercedes-Benz FO 108V 2.4 litre V8 Naturally aspirated, mid-engined
- Transmission: McLaren 7-speed + 1 reverse sequential seamless semi-automatic paddle shift with epicyclic differential and multi-plate limited slip clutch
- Battery: GS Yuasa
- Power: 810 hp @ 19,000 RPM (Limited)
- Weight: 605 kg (1,334 lb)
- Fuel: Mobil Synergy Unleaded (5.75% bio fuel)
- Lubricants: Mobil 1 (newly developed 2008 formula for lower friction and better wear resistance)
- Tyres: Bridgestone Potenza; Enkei Wheels Front & Rear

Competition history
- Notable entrants: Vodafone McLaren Mercedes
- Notable drivers: 22. (United Kingdom) Lewis Hamilton; 23. (Finland) Heikki Kovalainen
- Debut: 2008 Australian Grand Prix
- First win: 2008 Australian Grand Prix
- Last win: 2008 Chinese Grand Prix
- Last event: 2008 Brazilian Grand Prix
Races	Wins	Podiums	Poles	F/Laps
18	6	13	8	3
- Constructors' Championships: 0
- Drivers' Championships: 1 (2008, Lewis Hamilton)

The McLaren MP4-23 was a Formula One racing car that was constructed by the Vodafone McLaren Mercedes team to compete in the 2008 Formula One World Championship. The chassis was designed by Paddy Lowe, Neil Oatley, Tim Goss, Andrew Bailey and Simon Lacey, with Andy Cowell designing the Mercedes-Benz engine. It was revealed at Mercedes-Benz's motor sport museum in Stuttgart on 7 January 2008, and it had its first on-track appearance at Circuito Permanente de Jerez in Spain on 9 January. The car won the 2008 World Drivers' Championship in the hands of Lewis Hamilton, but finished second in the Constructors' Championship, which was won by Scuderia Ferrari Marlboro. The car, along with its rivals during the season, marked the end of an era of complex aerodynamic appendages on the bodywork, which would be banned for 2009.

The MP4-23 was the last McLaren Formula One car to win the Drivers' Championship until Lando Norris ended a 17-year drought for McLaren by winning the 2025 Drivers' Championship with the MCL39.

== Development ==
Following the 2007 Formula One espionage controversy the MP4-23 was subject to FIA inspection before the start of the 2008 season, to determine if any Ferrari intellectual property was on the car. After an admission that the Ferrari information was disseminated more widely throughout the team than was originally thought, an apology was issued by McLaren on 13 December 2007, and a pledge that measures would be taken to rectify the situation was made. This caused the FIA to decide that there was no need for a formal hearing and the matter was considered closed.

As part of updated FIA regulations for the 2008 season, the MP4-23 as well as the other cars of 2008, used raised headrests in an effort to improve driver safety. The FIA had also banned traction control via the introduction of a standard ECU for 2008, making the MP4-23 the first McLaren to not use traction control since the 2001 MP4-16.

Revisions from the MP4-22 included a longer wheelbase, the removal of the "bullhorn" winglets from the airbox and a new rear wing which differed both in main profile and its endplates. In the pre-German Grand Prix testing, the car was run with a "shark fin" engine cover, as sported by cars such as the Renault R28 and the Red Bull RB4, but the team did not permanently run it.

At the 2008 Hungarian Grand Prix, some new aerodynamic parts were added, including "dumbo wings" on the nose, similar to those used by Honda on the RA108, which were temporarily removed at the Italian Grand Prix but reinstated for the rest of the season.

The MP4-23 was succeeded by the MP4-24.

== Sponsorship and livery ==
The livery did not differ much from that of the MP4-22: grey remained the primary colour, while red, together with the main sponsor Vodafone, appeared on both wings, on the sidepods, above the body and on the side vents. The team logo was also placed on top of the sidepods, on both sides. The other sponsors were: Johnnie Walker, SAP, Schüco International, Aigo, and Santander. As Fernando Alonso moved back to Renault, the Mutua Madrileña sponsorship was removed and returned to the Renault team.

At the Turkish Grand Prix, the Johnnie Walker logo was replaced by Diageo. In France, the Johnnie Walker logos were removed due to alcohol advertising being outlawed.

== McLaren MP4-23K ==
During the 2008-2009 off-season tests, McLaren tested a K version of its MP4-23, including a KERS and an enlarged front wing, modifications which would be used on the 2009 MP4-24.

== Later uses ==
In 2011, 2009 World Drivers' Champion Jenson Button drove the MP4-23 at the Mount Panorama Circuit. The car sported MP4-26 livery and ran on Pirelli slicks instead of Bridgestone grooved tyres. Also in the same year, 2-time NASCAR Cup Series champion Tony Stewart drove the MP4-23 at the Watkins Glen International circuit. In 2026, McLaren driver Oscar Piastri drove Lewis Hamilton's championship winning MP4-23 at the Miami International Autodrome.

== Gallery ==
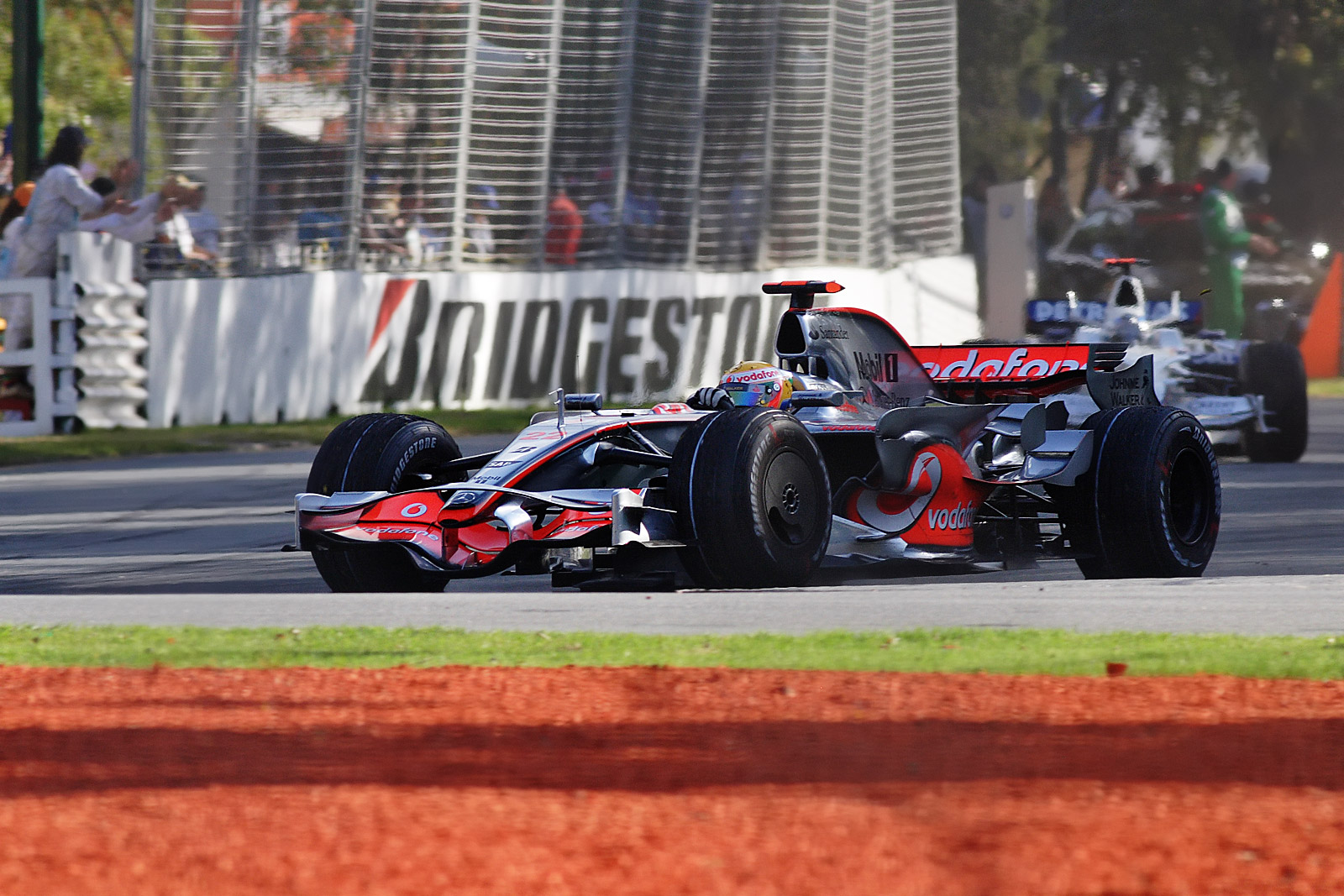
Lewis Hamilton driving the MP4-23 at the 2008 Australian Grand Prix.

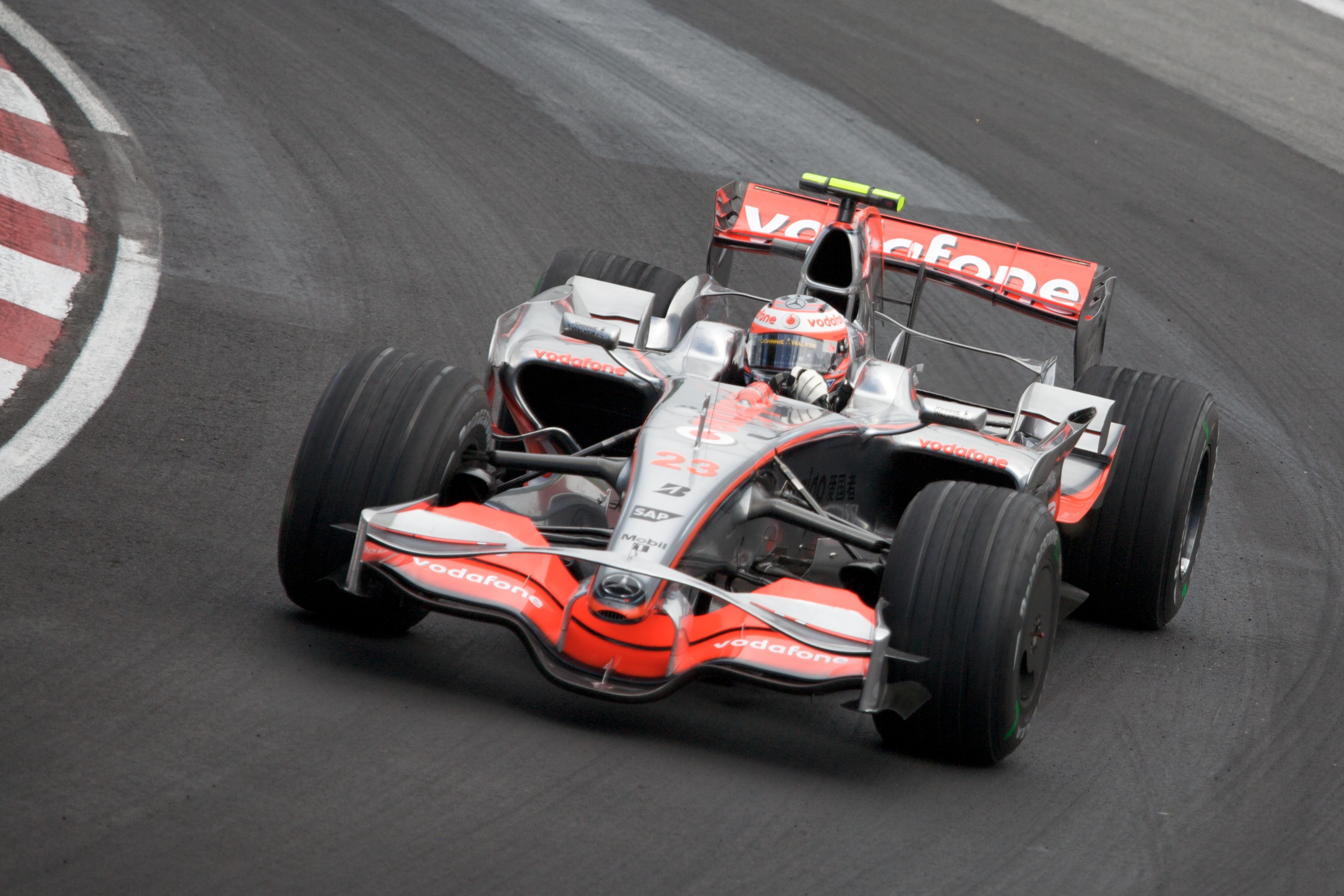
Heikki Kovalainen driving the MP4-23 at the 2008 Canadian Grand Prix.

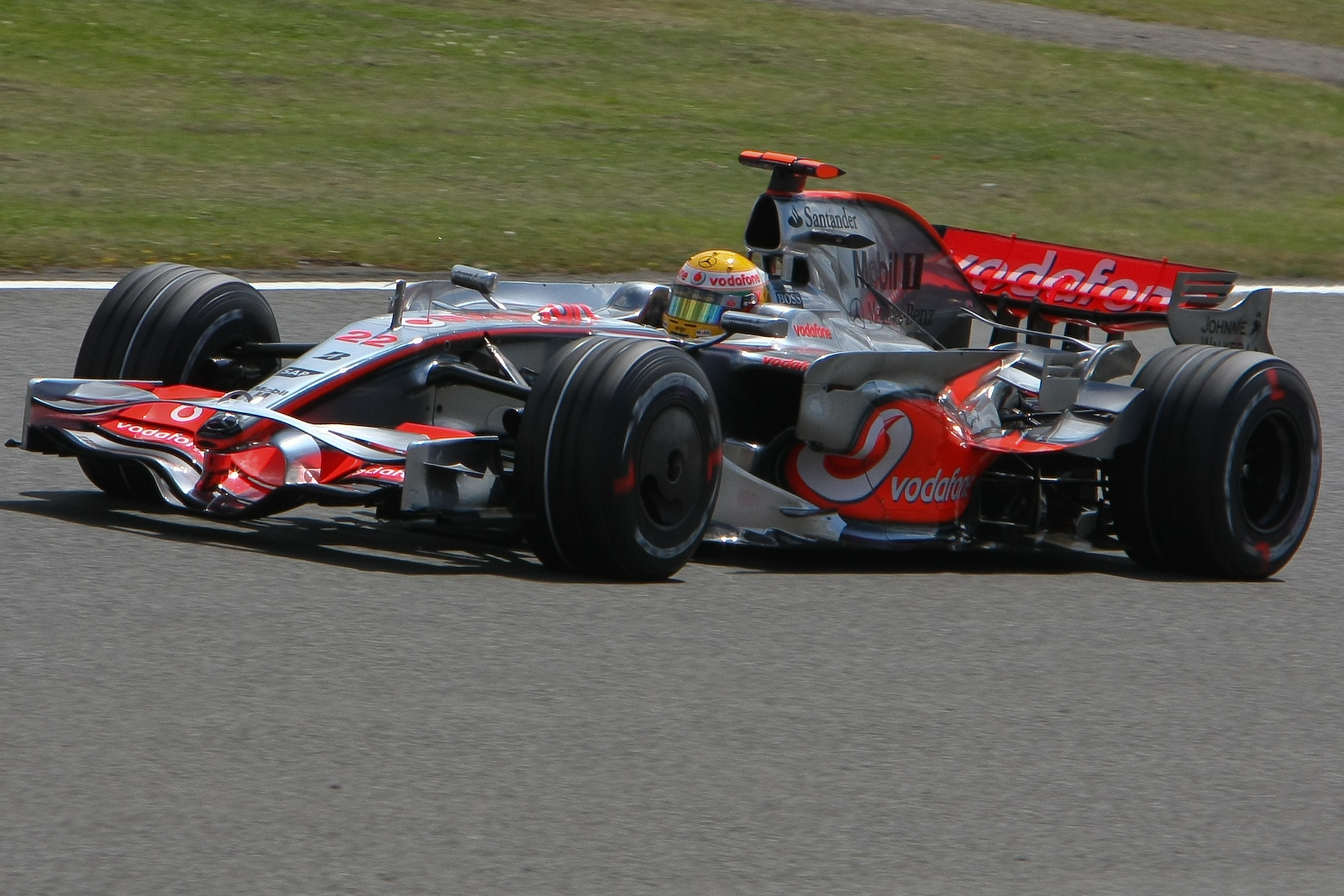
Hamilton drives to victory in the 2008 British Grand Prix.

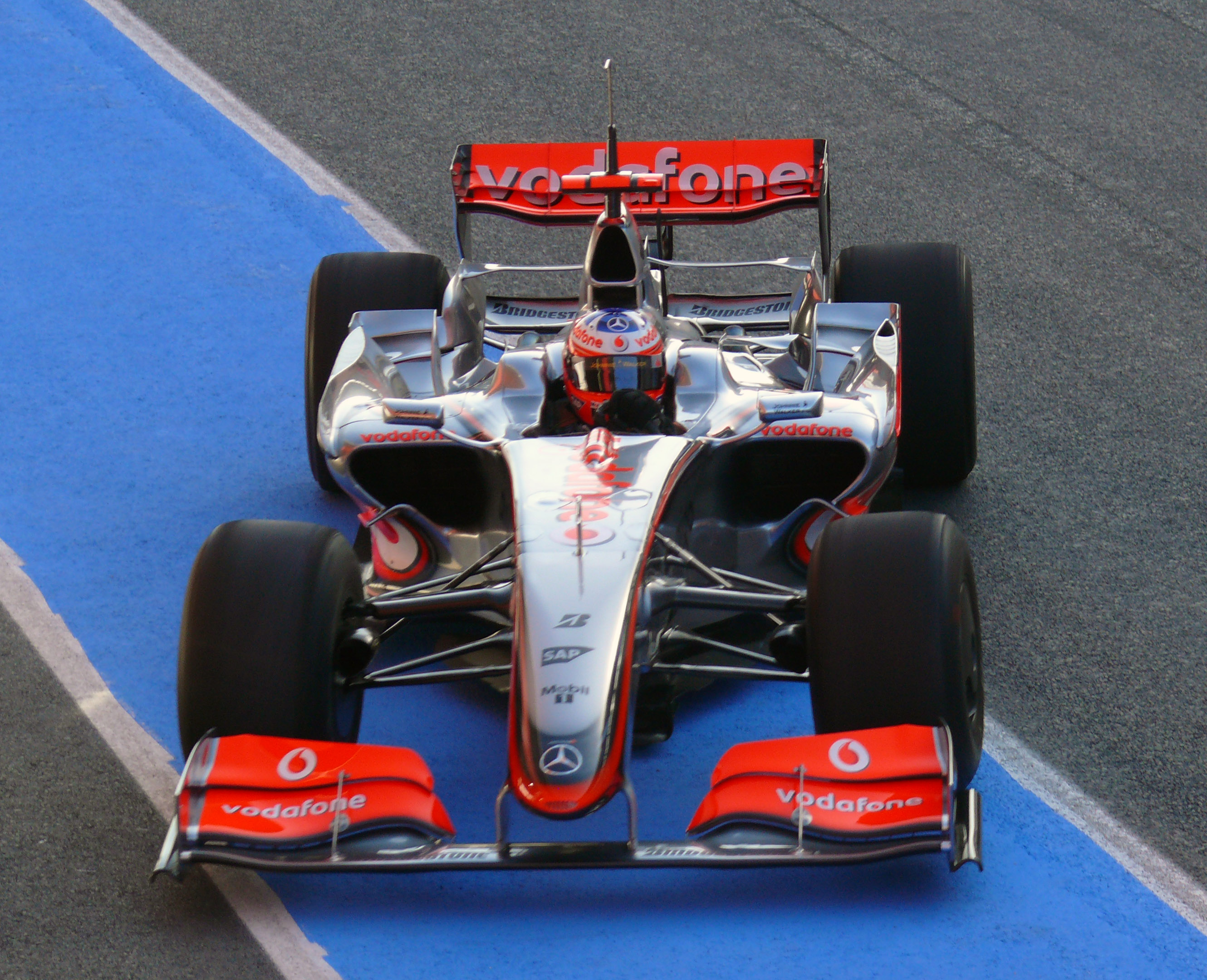
Gary Paffett testing a modified MP4-23K at the Autódromo Internacional do Algarve in preparation for the revised aerodynamic rules of 2009.

Chris Goodwin driving the MP4-23 at the 2009 Goodwood Festival of Speed

Chris Goodwin driving the MP4-23 at the 2010 Goodwood Festival of Speed

== Complete Formula One results ==
(key) (results in bold indicate pole position; results in italics indicate fastest lap)

Year	Team	Engine	Tyres	Drivers	1	2	3	4	5	6	7	8	9	10	11	12	13	14	15	16	17	18	Points	WCC
2008	Vodafone McLaren Mercedes	Mercedes FO 108V 2.4 V8	**B**		AUS	MAL	BHR	ESP	TUR	MON	CAN	FRA	GBR	GER	HUN	EUR	BEL	ITA	SIN	JPN	CHN	BRA	**151**	**2nd**
2008	Vodafone McLaren Mercedes	Mercedes FO 108V 2.4 V8	**B**	(United Kingdom) Lewis Hamilton	**1**	5	13	3	2	1	**Ret**	10	1	**1**	**5**	2	**3**	7	3	**12**	**1**	5	**151**	**2nd**
2008	Vodafone McLaren Mercedes	Mercedes FO 108V 2.4 V8	**B**	(Finland) Heikki Kovalainen	5	3	5	Ret	12	8	9	4	**5**	5	1	4	10^{†}	2	10	Ret	Ret	7	**151**	**2nd**

== Notes and references ==
Awards
Preceded by McLaren MP4-22	Autosport; Racing Car of the Year; 2008	Succeeded by Brawn BGP 001
