= McLaren MP4-21 =

Formula One racing car

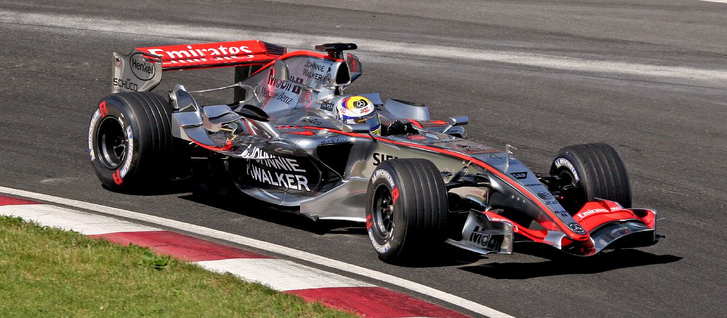
- Juan Pablo Montoya driving the MP4-21 at the 2006 Canadian Grand Prix
- Category: Formula One
- Constructor: McLaren
- Designers: Neil Oatley (Executive Engineer); Adrian Newey (Technical Director); Paddy Lowe (Engineering Director); Tim Goss (Chief Engineer); Nikolas Tombazis (Chief Engineer, Vehicle Projects); Mark Williams (Chief Engineer, Vehicle Performance); Mike Coughlan (Chief Designer); Peter Prodromou (Head of Aerodynamics); Markus Duesmann (Engineering Director - Mercedes); Andy Cowell (Chief Engineer, Engine - Mercedes)
- Predecessor: MP4-20
- Successor: MP4-22

Technical specifications
- Chassis: Moulded carbon fibre monocoque incorporating front and side impact structures
- Suspension (front): Inboard torsion bar/damper system operated by pushrod and bell crank with a double wishbone arrangement
- Suspension (rear): As front
- Length: 4,600 mm (181 in)
- Width: 1,800 mm (71 in)
- Height: 950 mm (37 in)
- Wheelbase: 3,100 mm (122 in)
- Engine: Mercedes-Benz FO108S, 2.4-litre V8 naturally-aspirated mid-engined
- Transmission: McLaren 7-speed + 1 reverse sequential seamless-shift semi-automatic paddle-shift with epicyclic differential and multi-plate limited slip clutch
- Battery: GS Yuasa
- Power: 750 hp @ 19,000 rpm
- Weight: 605 kg (1,334 lb)
- Fuel: Mobil Synergy unleaded
- Lubricants: Mobil 1
- Tyres: Michelin

Competition history
- Notable entrants: Team McLaren Mercedes
- Notable drivers: 3. (Finland) Kimi Räikkönen; 4. (Colombia) Juan Pablo Montoya; 4. (Spain) Pedro de la Rosa
- Debut: 2006 Bahrain Grand Prix
- Last event: 2006 Brazilian Grand Prix
Races	Wins	Poles	F/Laps
18	0	3	3
- Teams' Championships: 0
- Constructors' Championships: 0
- Drivers' Championships: 0

The McLaren MP4-21 was the car with which the McLaren team competed in the 2006 Formula One World Championship. It was driven initially by Kimi Räikkönen and Juan Pablo Montoya. After ten races, reserve driver Pedro de la Rosa took over Montoya's race seat. Gary Paffett was also a test driver for the MP4-21. The MP4-21 was the first V8-engined McLaren Formula One car since McLaren MP4/8 in 1993.

Future World Champion Lewis Hamilton drove the MP4-21 in his first official Formula One test in September, 2006 prior to joining McLaren for 2007.

== Overview ==
The MP4-21 was designed by Adrian Newey, Paddy Lowe, Tim Goss, Mike Coughlan and Peter Prodromou. The MP4-21 was the successor to the competitive MP4-20 of the prior season, although significantly different with 90% of the 11,500 components changed from the season prior. In addition, the utilisation of the new V8 specification engines meant that the side air intakes were reduced in size, therefore making aerodynamic benefits. The distinctive needle-nose design was previously used on the MP4-19 in 2004. The MP4-21 was the first McLaren car to be powered by purely Mercedes-Benz engines after 11 years partnership with Ilmor as an engine builder.

The MP4-21 was seen on track for the first time in late January 2006 at Barcelona. It was finished in a historic papaya orange livery. In February, the official livery of the MP4-21 was launched in a chrome finish.

== Racing history ==
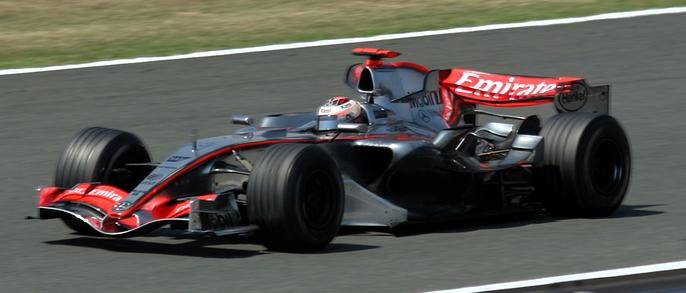
Räikkönen at the French Grand Prix

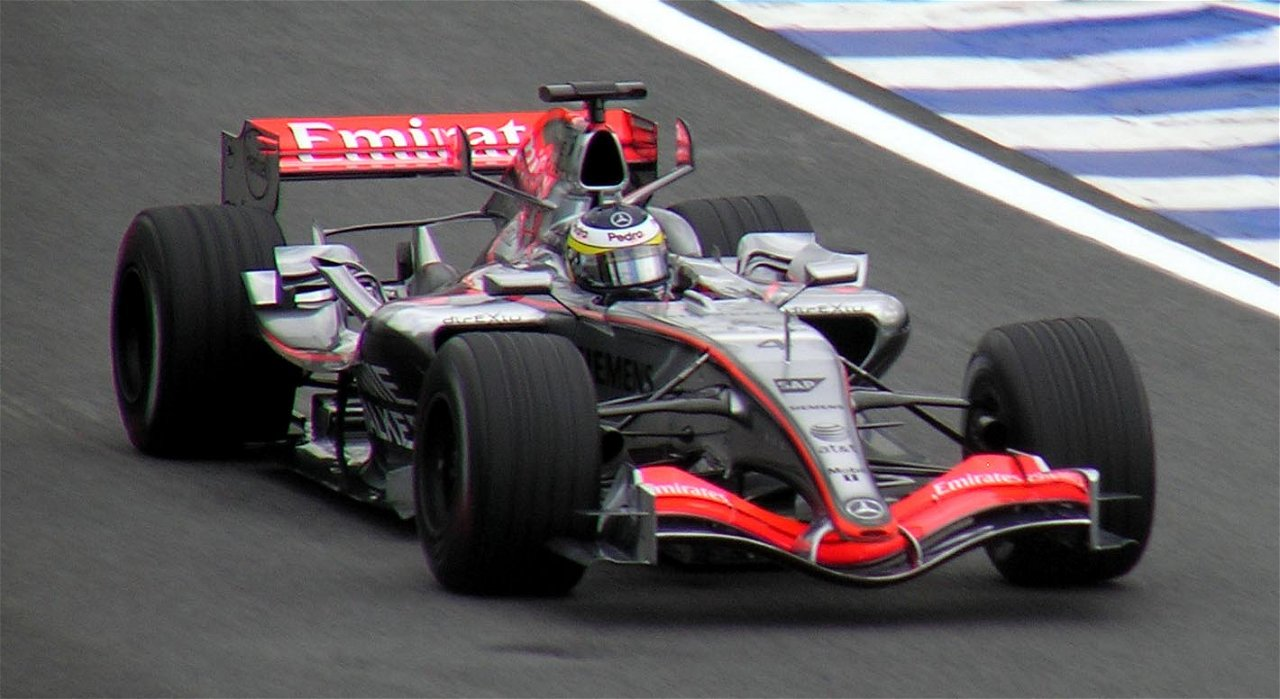
De la Rosa took over following Montoya's departure. Pictured is him during the Brazilian Grand Prix

During the first race of the season, a suspension failure in the first phase of qualifying forced Räikkönen to start from the back of the grid. Race at delivered a podium finish for Räikkönen. Montoya would score podiums at San Marino for third and Monaco for second, however there were six retirements in the first seven races for the MP4-21. The MP4-21 was regularly outpaced by the Ferrari 248 and the Renault R26.

In Monaco, the McLaren's regained better performance on a track that suited them. Räikkönen battled Alonso for the win for fifty laps before his broke down as the heat shield had exploded and he was forced to retire; he went from his car straight to his nearby yacht, fully dressed in his racing suit and immediately relaxed in his jacuzzi.

In Canada, Räikkönen started third behind the Renault's on the grid, and Montoya seventh. From the start, the Finn overtook Fisichella and tucked in behind Alonso, harassing him throughout the early stages of the race before his performance gradually declined, he stalled in the pits and slid on tire residue, handing second place to Michael Schumacher behind Alonso. Meanwhile, Montoya, after a chaotic start, took Rosberg out of the race before crashing into the "Welcome to Quebec" wall and retiring.

Montoya left the team in order to move to Chip Ganassi Racing in NASCAR after retiring from the 2006 United States Grand Prix. Pedro de La Rosa took his race seat. de La Rosa would score a career best second place at the 2006 Hungarian Grand Prix driving the MP4-21.

In the Brazilian Grand Prix, ITV pundit Martin Brundle asked Räikkönen why he missed a ceremony in which footballer Pelé presented Michael Schumacher with a lifetime achievement award, Räikkönen replied "I was having a shit".

Despite a number of podiums for all three drivers, McLaren did not win a single Grand Prix with the MP4-21. This was the first season since 1996 the team failed to win a race. Räikkönen finished in fifth place in the World Drivers' Championship. McLaren finished third in the World Constructors' Championship with 110 points.

== Post-season ==
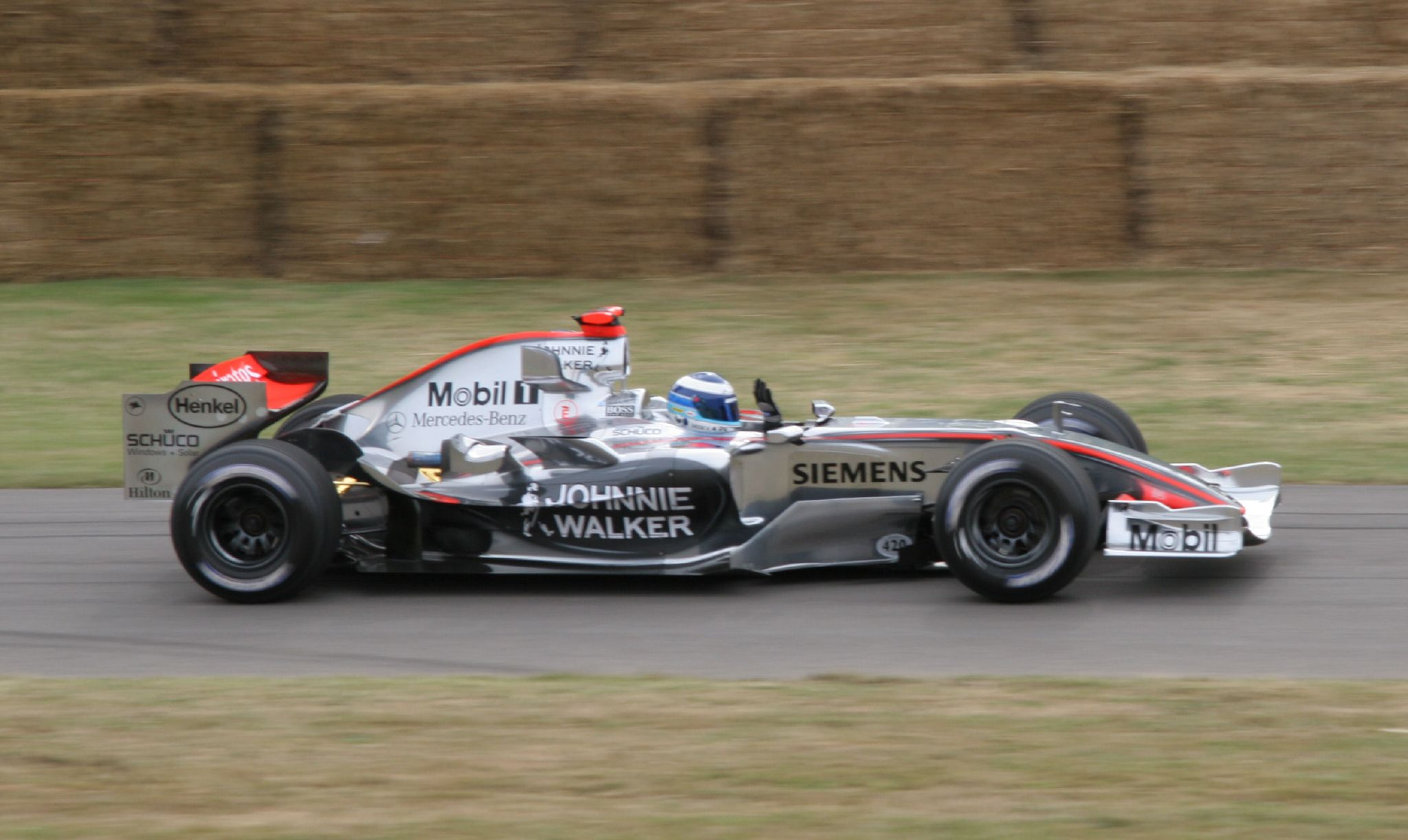
Mika Häkkinen driving the MP4-21 during the 2006 Goodwood Festival of Speed

Following the conclusion of the season, former driver and two-time world champion Mika Häkkinen tested the MP4-21 with a view to an F1 return. However, this did not materialise.

An MP4-21 showcar is displayed at the National Motor Museum in Beaulieu, although now painted in Jenson Button's 2010 livery. Before its closure, MP4-21 chassis 6 was on display at the Donington Grand Prix Collection. An MP4-21 show car is currently for sale via F1 Authentics. Chassis 3, driven by Montoya in the first three Grands Prix of the season and later tested by Hamilton, sold for £2 million in early 2025. It had been fully restored by McLaren in 2019.

== Sponsorship and livery ==
The team's sponsorship agreement with West had come to an end in 2005. Emirates and Johnnie Walker are the primary sponsors of the team.

In Bahrain, to overcome alcohol regulations, the Johnnie Walker text was replaced with "Keep Walking". In France, the logo was removed. In Turkey, it was replaced with Diageo, owner of the brand.

== Complete Formula One results ==
(key) (results in bold indicate pole position; results in italics indicate fastest lap)

Year	Team	Engine	Tyres	Drivers	1	2	3	4	5	6	7	8	9	10	11	12	13	14	15	16	17	18	Points	WCC
2006	McLaren	Mercedes-Benz V8	**MI**		BHR	MAL	AUS	SMR	EUR	ESP	MON	GBR	CAN	USA	FRA	GER	HUN	TUR	ITA	CHN	JPN	BRA	**110**	**3rd**
2006	McLaren	Mercedes-Benz V8	**MI**	(Finland) Kimi Räikkönen	3	Ret	2	5	4	5	Ret	3	3	Ret	5	**3**	**Ret**	Ret	**2**	Ret	5	5	**110**	**3rd**
2006	McLaren	Mercedes-Benz V8	**MI**	(Colombia) Juan Pablo Montoya	5	4	Ret	3	Ret	Ret	2	6	Ret	Ret									**110**	**3rd**
2006	McLaren	Mercedes-Benz V8	**MI**	(Spain) Pedro de la Rosa											7	Ret	2	5	Ret	5	11	8	**110**	**3rd**
