= 2007 Formula One espionage controversy =

Scandal among the McLaren, Ferrari, and Renault F1 racing teams

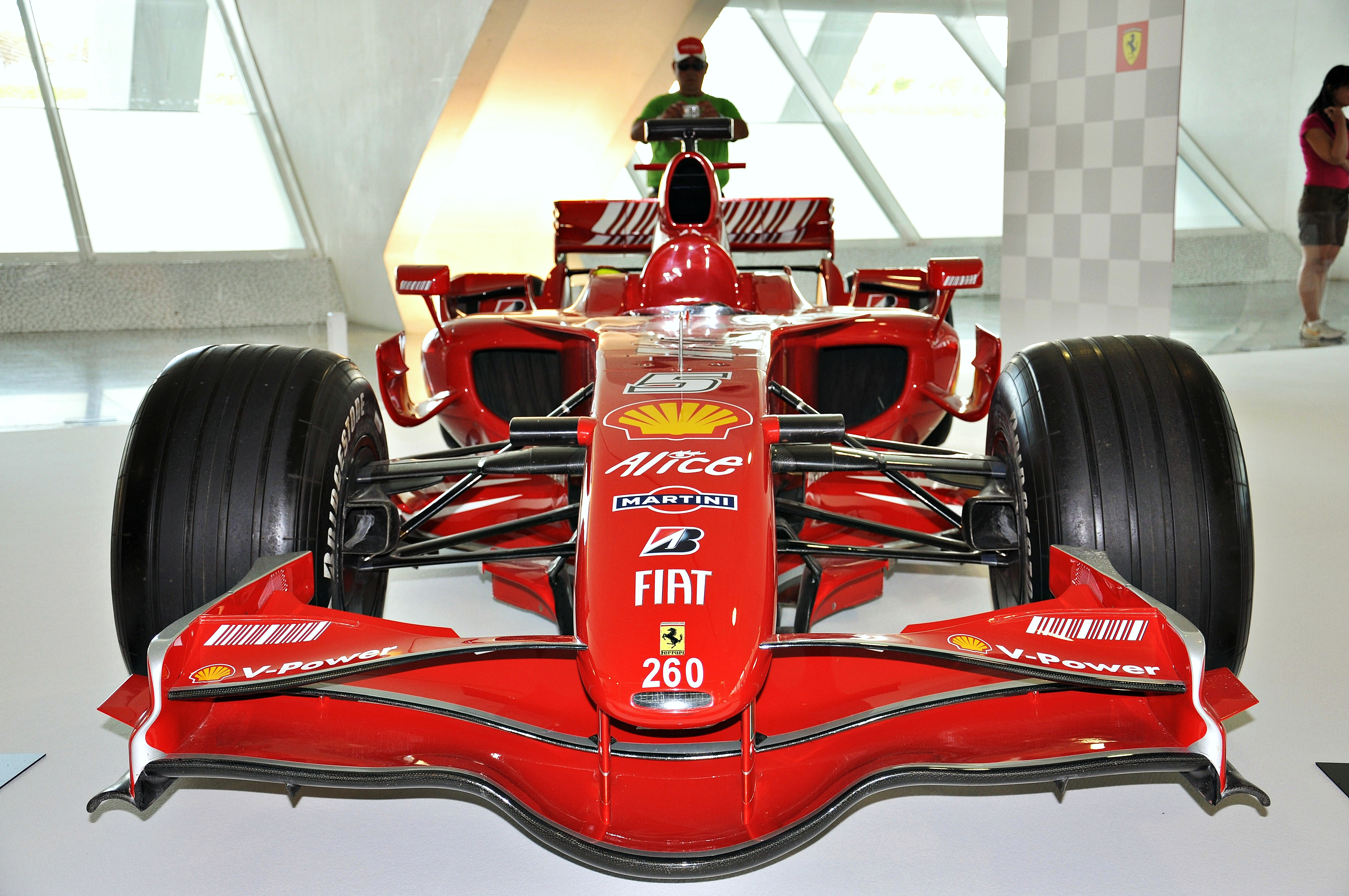
2007 Ferrari F2007

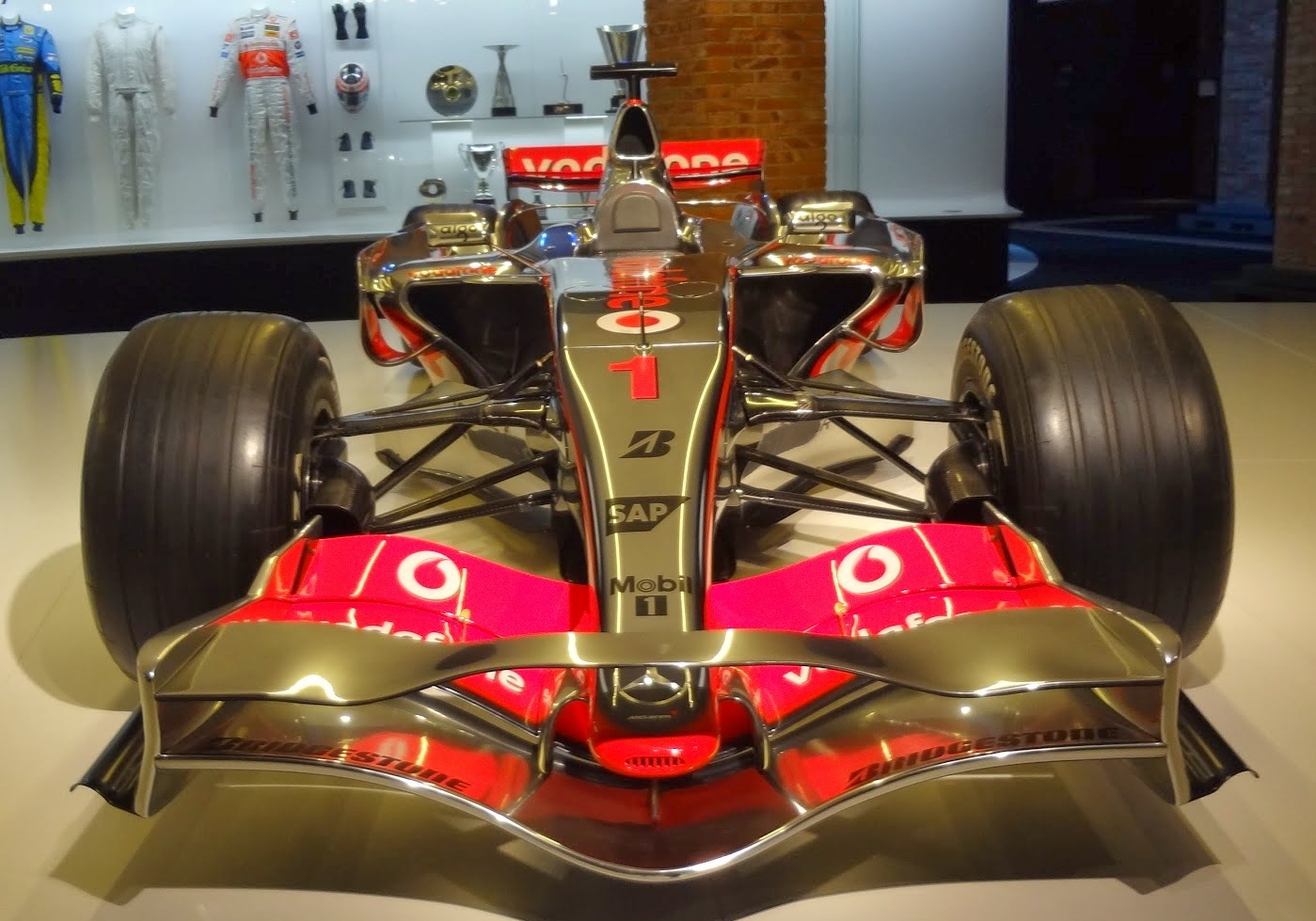
2007 McLaren MP4-22

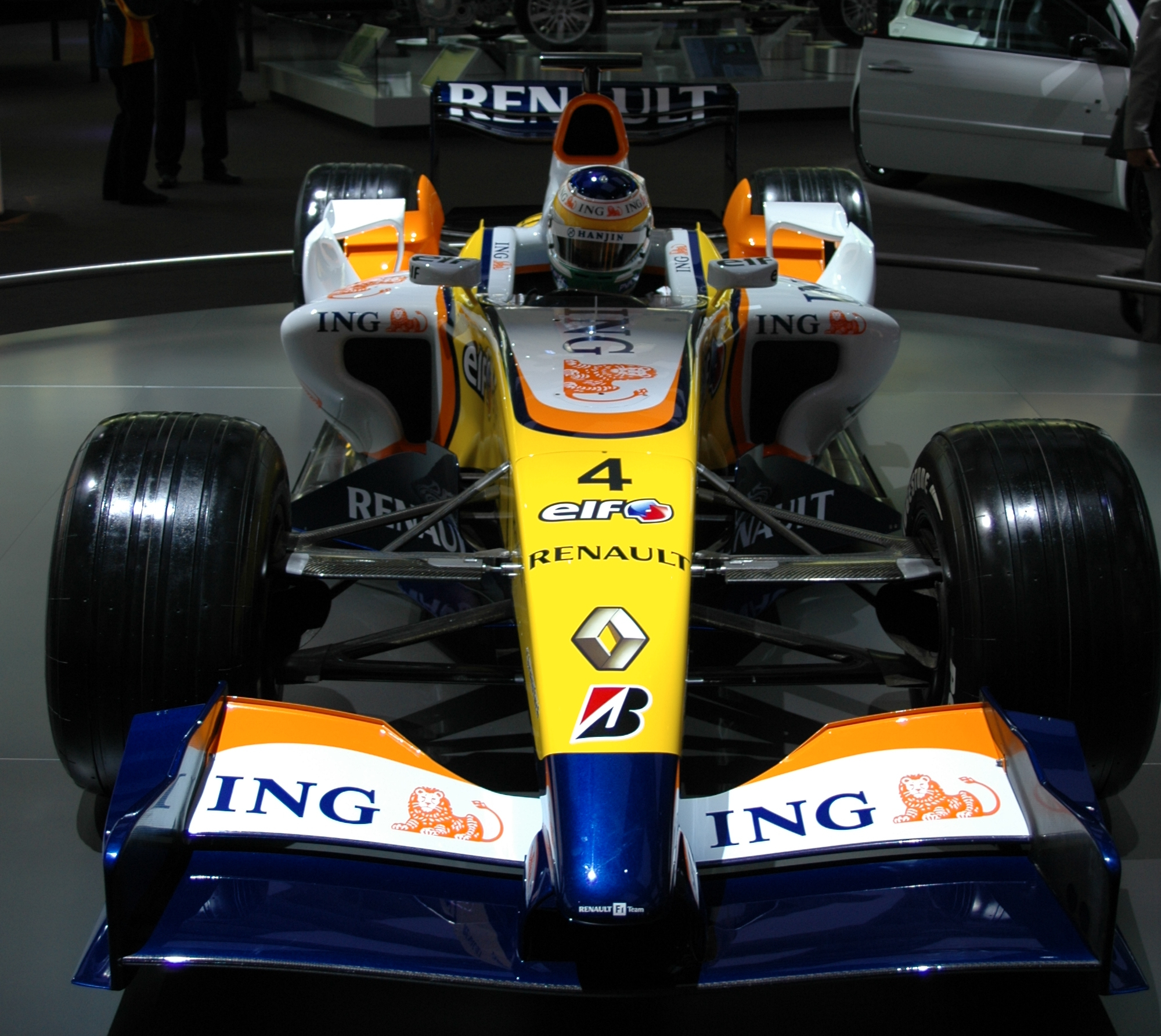
2007 Renault R27

The 2007 Formula One espionage controversy, also known as Spygate and Stepneygate, was a set of accusations among Formula One racing teams that confidential technical information had been passed between them. It involved the McLaren, Ferrari and Renault F1 teams.

The original case involved allegations made by the Ferrari Formula One team against a former employee, Nigel Stepney, a senior McLaren engineer, Mike Coughlan, and his wife, Trudy Coughlan, concerning the theft of technical information. These allegations were the subject of legal action in Italy and an Fédération Internationale de l'Automobile (FIA) investigation. A High Court case in England was dropped after Ferrari reached an agreement with the Coughlans.

An FIA hearing into the matter took place on 26 July 2007 but did not result in any penalty for McLaren. However, a second hearing took place on 13 September 2007, and by then, compelling evidence resulted in several penalties for the team. The most important of these were the team's exclusion from the 2007 Constructors' Championship and a record-breaking fine of $100 million. However, it was estimated that McLaren would pay closer to $31 million. As of 2025, this remains the largest fine in sporting history. Following information from McLaren, allegations were subsequently made during November 2007 by the FIA against the Renault F1 team regarding information they were found to have in their possession concerning the 2006 and 2007 McLaren F1 cars. These allegations were also the subject of an FIA investigation, with a hearing taking place on 6 December 2007.

== Background ==
Along with Michael Schumacher, Jean Todt, Ross Brawn, and Rory Byrne, Nigel Stepney was part of the "dream team" credited with the change of fortunes of Ferrari in the late 1990s.

In February 2007, Stepney made public comments regarding his "unhappiness" following the team's reorganization which had resulted from Ross Brawn's departure:

I am looking at spending a year away from Ferrari, I'm not currently happy with the situation within the team - I really want to move forward with my career and that's something that's not happening right now. Ideally, I'd like to move into a new environment here at Ferrari - but if an opportunity arose with another team, I would definitely consider it.

Later that month, Ferrari announced another change in the team structure which saw Stepney appointed as head of Team Performance Development: "After many years spent working on the Formula One circuits, the last 13 of those as part of the Ferrari Race Team, Nigel Stepney, with the approval of the company, has chosen to take on a different role that will see him no longer have to attend the races."

== Details ==
=== Allegations against Stepney ===
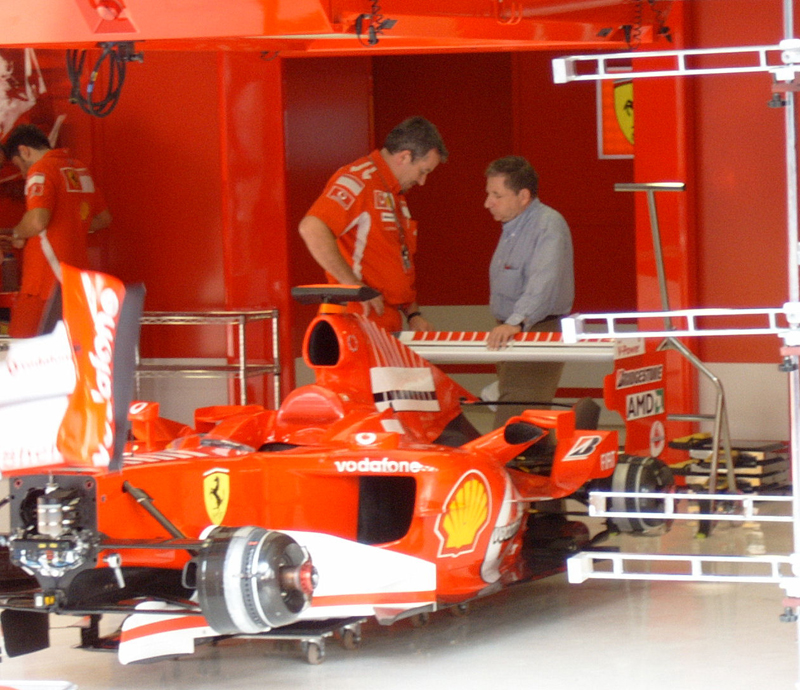
Nigel Stepney (left) and Jean Todt inside Scuderia Ferrari box at 2005 Italian Grand Prix

In the week beginning 17 June 2007, at the 2007 United States Grand Prix Ferrari filed a formal complaint against Stepney, leading to the commencement of a criminal investigation by the Modena district attorney in Italy.

On 3 July 2007, Gazzetta dello Sport reported that Ferrari had completed its internal investigation and had dismissed Stepney as a result. At the same time, Ferrari spokesman Luca Colajanni told ITV Sport that Ferrari's action against Stepney related to "irregularities discovered at the Ferrari factory prior to the Monaco Grand Prix".

=== Allegations against Coughlan ===
On the day Ferrari announced Stepney's dismissal, the team also announced it had taken action against "an engineer from the Vodafone McLaren-Mercedes team", later named as Mike Coughlan. Coughlan was suspended by McLaren as a result.

A Scuderia Ferrari press release said:

Ferrari announces it has recently presented a case against Nigel Stepney and an engineer from the Vodafone McLaren-Mercedes team [named by Autosport.com as Coughlan] with the Modena Tribunal, concerning the theft of technical information. Furthermore, legal action has been instigated in England and a search warrant has been issued concerning the engineer. This produced a positive outcome.

The search warrant is understood to have been related to Coughlan's home and the "positive outcome" is reported to be documents claimed to have originated at Ferrari's Maranello factory. Stepney's dismissal from Ferrari had been announced earlier the same day.

On 10 July 2007 a High Court hearing was opened and adjourned until the following day, to allow Mike Coughlan to submit an affidavit. However, details released included the fact that Mike Coughlan was alleged by Ferrari to be in possession of 780 pages of Ferrari documentation, and that his wife was alleged to have taken them to a photocopying shop near Woking. Ferrari were unaware that their technical information had been stolen until they received a tip from an employee in the photocopying shop. The staff member saw that the documents were confidential and belonged to Ferrari and, after copying them, decided to contact the team's headquarters in Italy.

Coughlan did not submit the affidavit because of the possibility of it being used against him in an Italian court case. However, late on 10 July 2007, Ferrari reached an agreement with Mr. and Mrs. Coughlan under which Ferrari dropped its High Court case in return for their full disclosure of all they knew about the case and a promise of future cooperation.

On 16 July 2007, McLaren announced that its own internal investigation had revealed that "no Ferrari materials or data are or have ever been in the possession of any McLaren employee other than the individual sued by Ferrari. The fact that he held at his home unsolicited materials from Ferrari was not known to any other member of the team prior to July 3."

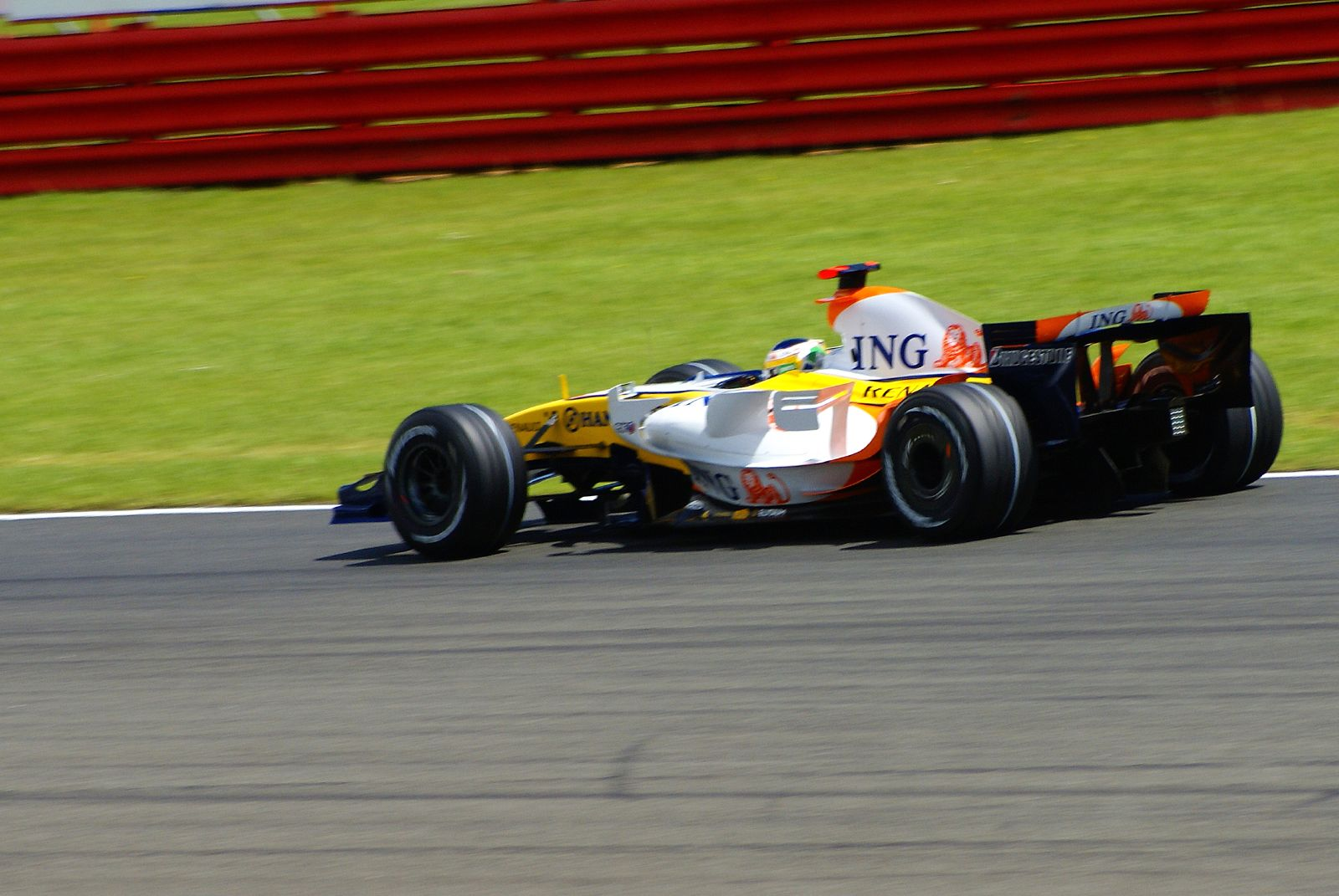
Renault R27 at the 2007 British Grand Prix

=== Allegations against Renault F1 ===
On 8 November 2007, the FIA announced that the Renault F1 team would be summoned before the FIA World Motorsport Council to answer a charge of possession of confidential information relating to the 2006 and 2007 McLaren Formula One cars. The statement issued by the FIA states that Renault F1 was found to have information "including, but not limited to the layout and critical dimensions of the McLaren F1 car, together with details of the McLaren fuelling system, gear assembly, oil cooling system, hydraulic control system and a novel suspension component (a J-damper) used by the 2006 and 2007 McLaren F1 cars". The date for the hearing was set for 6 December 2007. The espionage claims are thought to revolve around an employee, Philip Mackereth, who transferred from McLaren to Renault taking the information with him when he switched teams, according to FIA President Max Mosley.

=== FIA investigation ===
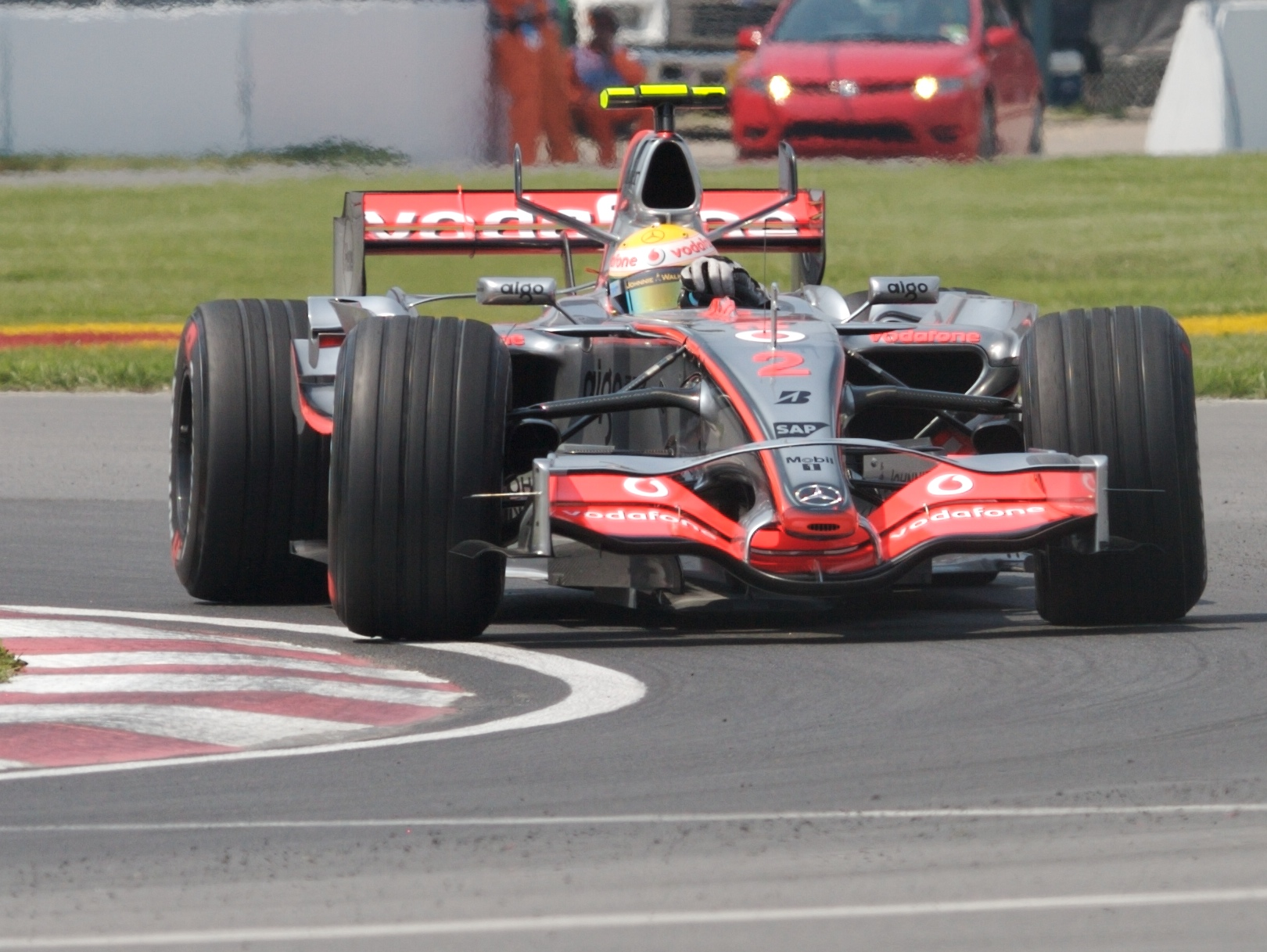
McLaren MP4-22 at the 2007 Canadian Grand Prix

On 4 July 2007, McLaren announced it had conducted an investigation and concluded that "no Ferrari intellectual property has been passed to any other members of the team or incorporated into [our] cars." The team also invited the FIA to inspect its cars to confirm these facts; "In order to address some of the speculation McLaren has invited the FIA to conduct a full review of its cars to satisfy itself that the team has not benefited from any intellectual property of another competitor." Since the revelation of Coughlan's involvement in the affair, McLaren provided a full set of drawings and development documents to the FIA, detailing all updates made to the team's chassis since the incident occurred at the end of April.

On 12 July 2007, the FIA announced that it had summoned McLaren to an extraordinary meeting of the FIA World Motor Sport Council to answer charges that they had breached Article 151C of the International Sporting Code. At the hearing on 26 July 2007, FIA found that Vodafone McLaren-Mercedes was in possession of confidential Ferrari information and is therefore in breach of the Code, but with no evidence that they had used the information no punishment was levied. However, the FIA reserved the right to reconvene on the matter if any such evidence subsequently came to light.

Ferrari labelled the decision "incomprehensible"; Autosport judged the team to be "furious". McLaren said "[a] unanimous decision has been taken by the FIA which in McLaren's opinion is very balanced and fair." The matter was referred to the FIA International Court of Appeal, with the hearing scheduled for 13 September 2007.

On 1 August 2007, Ron Dennis, in an open letter to the president of the Italian motorsport authority Luigi Macaluso, accused Ferrari of giving a false and dishonest version of events and further that the car used to win the 2007 Australian Grand Prix was illegal. McLaren learned of the "illegal" floor device from Nigel Stepney, with the team describing this contact as whistle-blowing. However the team insists that following this incident, Jonathan Neale instructed Coughlan to cease contact with Stepney. McLaren accused Ferrari of trying to blur this "whistle-blowing" of which McLaren was aware, with Coughlan's possession of the 780 page Ferrari dossier of which it insists it was not aware.

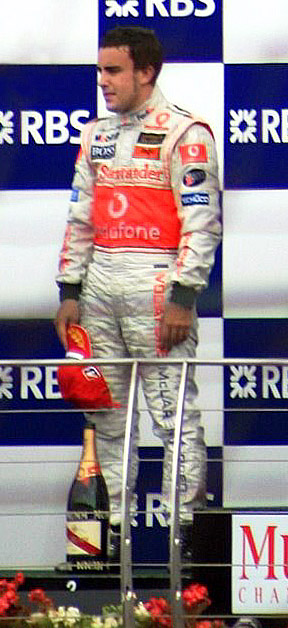
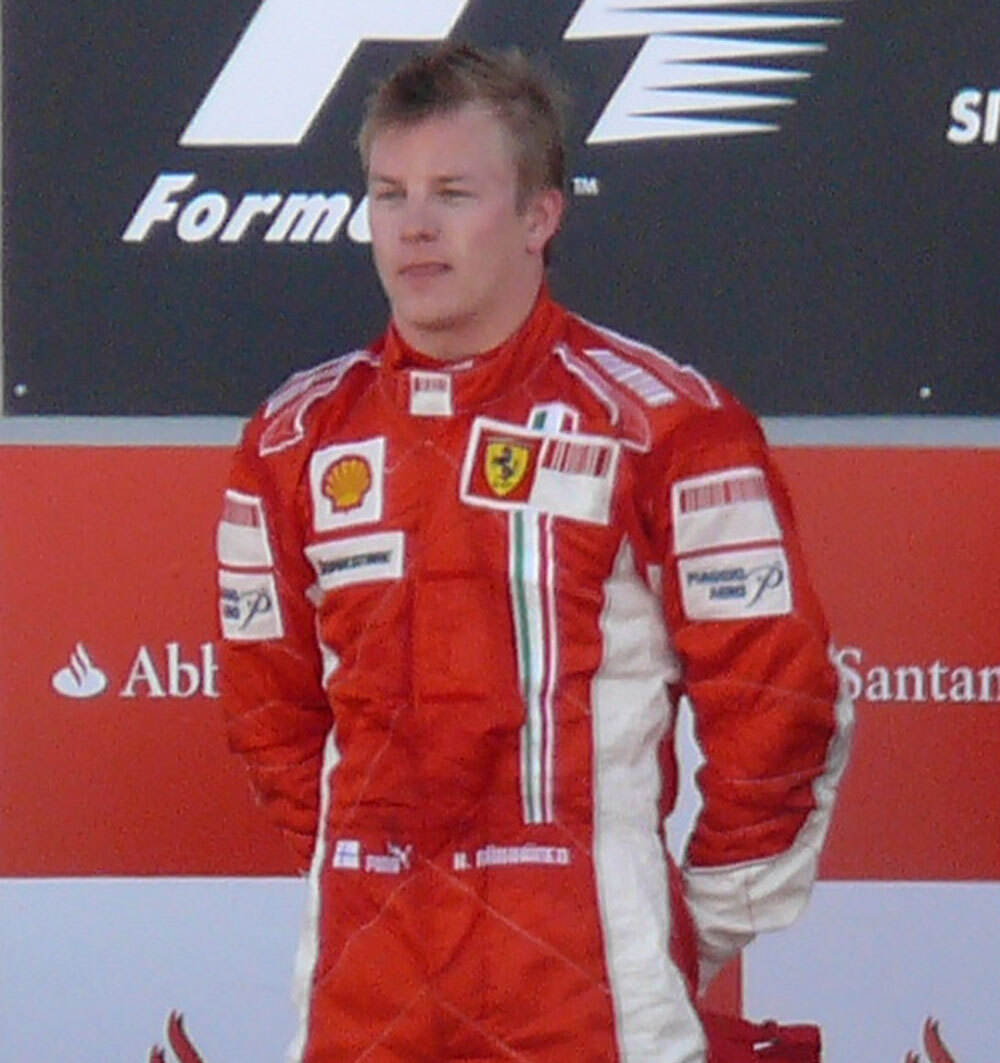
Both Hamilton (left) and Alonso (center) were involved in a championship battle against Räikkönen (right).

The 2007 Hungarian Grand Prix was a controversial weekend for McLaren; Lewis Hamilton had disobeyed a team instruction, disadvantaging Fernando Alonso, and so Alonso held Hamilton up in the pit lane during qualifying, denying Hamilton a chance to record a final lap time. In the following discord within the team, TV pictures showed Ron Dennis angrily throwing his headphones down as Alonso pulled out of the pits, and after the session was over he was then shown having a serious conversation with Alonso's trainer. On the morning of the race (5 August), Alonso met Ron Dennis in his motorhome and allegedly threatened to send his email exchanges with McLaren test driver Pedro de la Rosa and Coughlan to the FIA. According to Max Mosley, Ron Dennis informed him of the conversation and told Mosley that the threat was an empty one, "There's no information, there's nothing to come out; I can assure you that if there was something, Max, I would have told you." Mosley subsequently retracted the implication that Dennis had lied.

On 5 September 2007, the FIA announced that it had received new evidence regarding the case, and would re-open the investigation on 13 September. This replaced the planned appeal hearing. It later transpired that the new evidence was the driver's emails that were sent to Bernie Ecclestone, F1's commercial rights holder who then informed the FIA. The FIA requested the three McLaren drivers (Alonso, Hamilton, and de la Rosa) to provide relevant evidence and help the FIA in further investigation. In return, the FIA offered assurance that any information made available would not result in any proceeding against the driver personally under the International Sporting Code or the Formula One Regulations. However, the drivers were notified that if it later came to light that they had withheld any potentially relevant information, serious consequences could follow.

On 11 September, McLaren approached the FIA with questions about the Renault F1 team, and possibly other (then unknown) teams as well. At the time, it was unknown if the meeting related directly to the espionage scandal, but a key McLaren argument made was that if McLaren was guilty, other teams were as well.

On 13 September, the FIA hearing imposed a penalty for illicitly collecting and holding information from Ferrari to confer a dishonest and fraudulent sporting advantage upon McLaren. The penalty consisted of exclusion from and withdrawal of all points awarded to McLaren in all rounds of the 2007 Constructors' Championship, a record fine of $100 million (less the TV and travel income lost as a result of the points deduction), and the obligation for the team to submit its 2008 chassis for scrutiny. However, Fernando Alonso and Lewis Hamilton's points were not affected, and the two were free to contest the Drivers' Championship, because McLaren's drivers were offered immunity in exchange for cooperation. The team was not banned and all drivers points earned only counted towards the driver's championship points. Whenever a McLaren driver won any of the remaining races (the only example being Hamilton at the Japanese Grand Prix), no McLaren representative other than a driver was allowed onto the podium.

On 14 September, Ron Dennis announced that he was the one who alerted the FIA that further evidence existed.

On 15 September, Max Mosley contested Ron Dennis's claim that he alerted the FIA to the existence of further evidence, claiming that Dennis actually alerted him that Alonso had decided to send the emails in himself, and that Mosley had been erroneously assured by Dennis that the emails contained nothing incriminating.

On 21 October, during the investigation, at the final race in Brazil, both McLaren drivers lost the championship to Kimi Räikkönen.

On 6 December, Renault were found guilty of breaching article 151(c) of the International Sporting Code by another FIA WMSC hearing, but escaped penalty.

On 13 December, McLaren issued a press release detailing a letter sent by Martin Whitmarsh, COO of the team, to the FIA. In the letter, Whitmarsh stated that the team accepted that "a number of McLaren employees" had access to Ferrari technical information, and apologised that it took the intervention of the FIA for this to come to light. The team also offered to "enter into discussion... as to a moratorium of an appropriate length in respect of the use" of the systems. On the same day, the FIA issued a press release stating that the FIA president would ask the members of the World Council "for their consent to cancel the hearing scheduled for 14 February 2008 and, in the interests of the sport, to consider this matter closed."

On 23 February 2009, legal proceedings against McLaren employees in Italy were dropped. In return, Mike Coughlan had to pay €180,000 while three employees of McLaren (Paddy Lowe, Jonathan Neale and Rob Taylor) had to pay €150,000.
