= Mike Krack =

Luxembourgish motorsports engineer (born 1972)

- Born: 18 March 1972 (age 54); Luxembourg
- Occupation: Chief Trackside Officer
- Employer: Aston Martin Formula One Team

Mike Krack (born 18 March 1972) is a Luxembourgish motorsports engineer. Since 2025, he has been serving as the Chief Trackside Officer at Aston Martin; he previously served as the team’s Team Principal. Krack had also previously worked at BMW Sauber, Porsche and BMW.

In January 2022, he was appointed as Team Principal of Aston Martin which he served for close to 3 years before being moved to the role of Chief Trackside Officer with Group CEO Andy Cowell taking over his former position.

== Career ==
=== BMW/Sauber (1998–2012, 2015–2022) ===
Krack started his engineering journey at BMW in July 1998 with the role of Test Engineer. He left the role at the start of 2001 to join Sauber. He rose through the ranks, beginning as a Data Analysis Engineer before being promoted in December 2003 to become Felipe Massa's race engineer before being promoted to Chief Engineer when they turned into BMW Sauber. Krack was Robert Kubica's engineer during the first half of 2006, when the Pole was BMW Sauber's test and reserve driver.During this time, he was partnering Sebastian Vettel through practice sessions until his debut in the 2007 United States Grand Prix.

Krack departed BMW Sauber following the decision to focus on 2009 season instead of Robert Kubica's title challenge in 2008. He returned to BMW as Chief Engineer of the DTM Department in October 2010 but left at the end of 2012 to join Porsche.

After leaving Porsche in 2014, Krack rejoined BMW and from 2015 to 2022, he served in various positions including overseeing the Formula E, IMSA, and GT programmes. In 2018, he was appointed as Head of Race & Test Engineering, Operations & Organisation.

=== Porsche (2013–2014) ===
At Porsche, he served Head of Track Engineering for their World Endurance Championship team. He was involved in the preparations of the Porsche 919 Hybrid, which would take one victory and four podiums.

Krack left in 2014 to return to BMW as Senior Performance Engineer.

=== Aston Martin (2022–present) ===
On 14 January 2022, Krack was announced as the new Team Principal of Aston Martin following the departure of Otmar Szafnauer as Team Principal. Krack subsequently oversaw Aston Martin's rise in performance in the 2023 Season, with 8 podiums by Fernando Alonso and finishing 5th in the Constructors' Championship.

On 10 January 2025, it was announced that Krack had been moved to Chief Trackside Officer as part of an organisational restructure, from his role as Team Principal following the 2024 season and was replaced in his former role by Group CEO Andy Cowell who joined Aston Martin in October 2024. Krack's new role of Chief Trackside Officer was responsible for "continued focus on getting the most performance out of the car at the racetrack", which meant he absorbed the responsibilities of Performance Director Tom McCullough, who was subsequently moved to a leadership position in Aston Martin to oversee the team's broad range of racing categories.

In the final rounds of the 2025 Formula One World Championship, Mike Krack served as Acting Team Principal in the Qatar and Abu Dhabi rounds following the re-designation of CEO and Team Principal Andy Cowell as Chief Strategy Officer, with him no longer appearing at trackside after the 2025 Las Vegas Grand Prix, thus Mike Krack essentially served as the Acting Team Principal in his role as Chief Trackside Officer.
