= 2007 Monaco Grand Prix =

Coordinates: 43°44′4.74″N 7°25′16.8″E

Race 5 of 17 in the 2007 Formula One World Championship
← Previous race	Next race →

Race details
- Date: 27 May 2007
- Official name: Formula 1 Grand Prix de Monaco 2007
- Location: Circuit de Monaco
- Course: Street circuit
- Course length: 3.34 km (2.08 miles)
- Distance: 78 laps, 260.52 km (162.24 miles)
- Weather: Cloudy, air temp 24–27 °C (75–81 °F), track temp 33–42 °C (91–108 °F)

Pole position
Driver	(Spain) Fernando Alonso	McLaren-Mercedes
- Time: 1:15.726

Fastest lap
Driver	(Spain) Fernando Alonso	McLaren-Mercedes
- Time: 1:15.284 on lap 44

Podium
First	(Spain) Fernando Alonso	McLaren-Mercedes
Second	(United Kingdom) Lewis Hamilton	McLaren-Mercedes
Third	(Brazil) Felipe Massa	Ferrari

The 2007 Monaco Grand Prix (officially the Formula 1 Grand Prix de Monaco 2007) was a Formula One motor race held on 27 May 2007 at the Circuit de Monaco. It was the fifth race of the 2007 FIA Formula One World Championship.

The 78-lap race was won from pole position by Spanish driver Fernando Alonso, driving a McLaren-Mercedes. Alonso took his second consecutive Monaco win by four seconds from English teammate Lewis Hamilton, with Brazilian Felipe Massa third in a Ferrari.

== Report ==
=== Background ===
The Grand Prix was contested by 22 drivers, in eleven teams of two. The teams, also known as "constructors", were Renault, McLaren-Mercedes, Ferrari, Honda, Spyker-Ferrari, BMW Sauber, Toyota, Red Bull-Renault, Williams-Toyota, Toro Rosso-Ferrari and Super Aguri.

Before the race, McLaren driver Lewis Hamilton led the Drivers' Championship, with 30 points, ahead of team-mate Fernando Alonso on 28 and Ferrari driver Felipe Massa on 27 points. Massa's team-mate Kimi Räikkönen was fourth, ahead of BMW Sauber's Nick Heidfeld in fifth. In the Constructors' Championship, McLaren were leading with 58 points, nine points ahead of Ferrari with 49 points; BMW Sauber were a further 26 points in third.

Testing started a week and a half before the race at Circuit Paul Ricard using the circuit's 2D SC configuration to replicate the Circuit de Monaco. Lewis Hamilton went on to score the fastest times on the days of testing whilst the circuit was in the Monaco configuration.

Hamilton, who had never lost a race on the Monte Carlo track (having won there in both GP2 and F3) played down his chances of winning the race, although he still remained "realistic" and optimistic, looking to fight for a win as is "the case with everything (he) competes in."

Six days before the race, Ferrari employee Nigel Stepney tried to sabotage Kimi Räikkönen's and Felipe Massa's cars, when a mysterious powder was found in the fuel tank of Räikkönen's and Massa's car. The parts were replaced before the race and the powder was sent to the police to be examined. Stepney was reportedly angry with Ferrari for not being promoted to technical director after Ross Brawn, left the team after last season.

Ferrari changed the colour of their car dark red which was changed to approximate the color scheme used by Marlboro.

=== Practice ===
The final practice session on Saturday morning was heavily affected by rain. Adrian Sutil of Spyker topped the timesheets for this session due to the conditions.

=== Qualifying ===
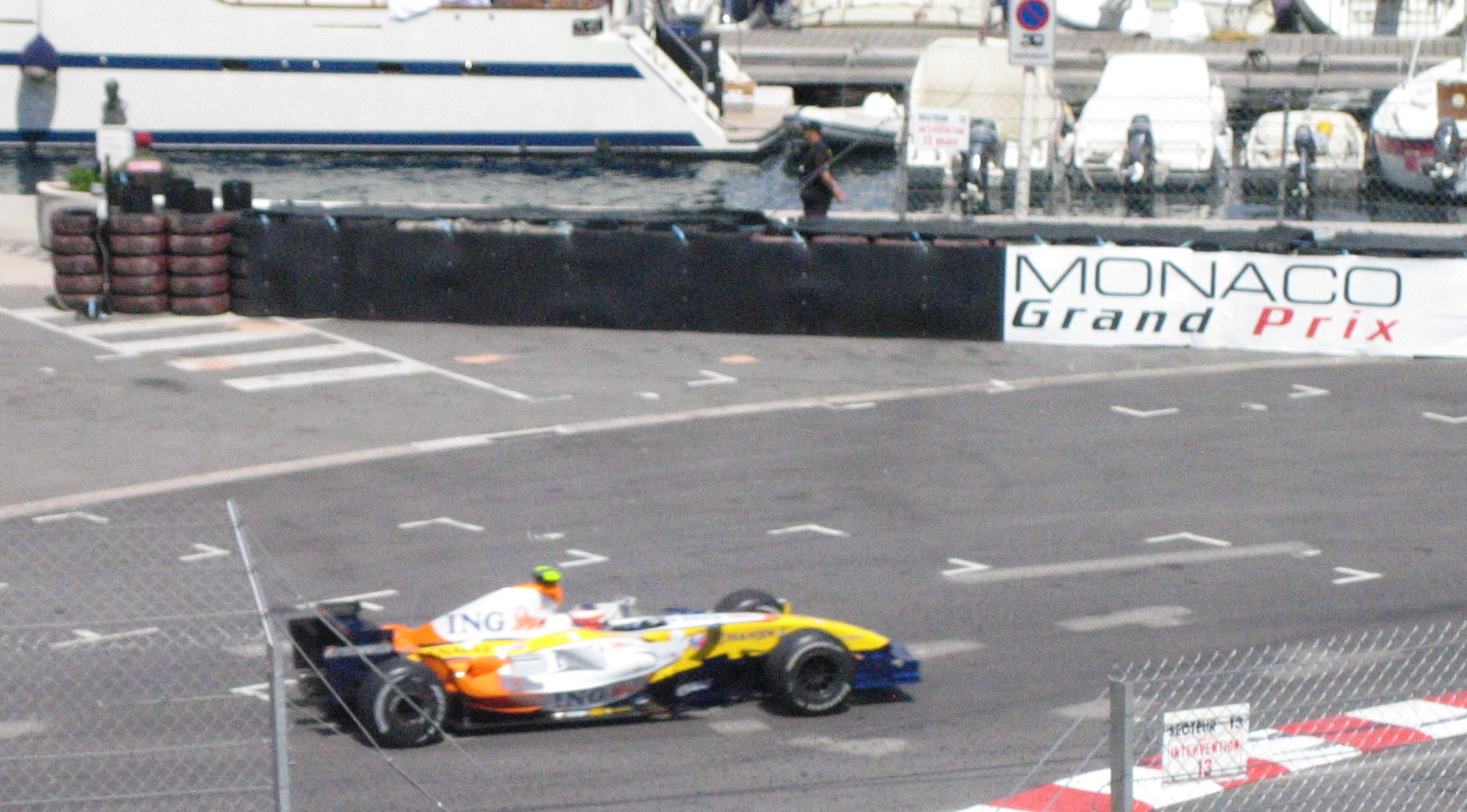
Heikki Kovalainen in Monaco

Qualifying was dominated throughout by the two McLarens of Hamilton and Fernando Alonso. Despite Hamilton setting fastest times for the first session, Alonso outpaced him in the final stages to take pole position, with Hamilton being held up slightly by Mark Webber. Felipe Massa of Ferrari qualified third fastest, posting a time after the clock stopped. Kimi Räikkönen made a mistake and hit the barriers coming out of the Swimming Pool Complex during the second qualifying stage, breaking his front-right suspension. The damage inflicted could not be repaired and he qualified sixteenth. Despite provisionally making the top ten, David Coulthard was penalised for impeding Heikki Kovalainen and demoted to thirteenth. Coulthard's demotion allowed Jenson Button to participate in the final qualifying stage, but he failed to move up the field and finished the qualifying session in 10th place.

Of those whose qualifying went well, former Monaco resident Giancarlo Fisichella fared best, putting his Renault on the second row in fourth place. Nico Rosberg's performance marked a return to form for his Williams team; his fifth place was the British constructor's best qualifying position since Mark Webber's second place at the same track one year before in 2006. Webber himself also fared well, filling the second slot on row three, alongside Rosberg, in sixth place.

=== Race ===
The race started at 14:00 CET. From the starting line everyone got away for the first laps, with Hamilton diving in behind Alonso to defend any of the Ferrari's advances. After the race, FIA launched an investigation of the McLaren team for giving out team orders, to the effect of asking Hamilton not to attempt to race or overtake Alonso. McLaren were later cleared of any wrongdoing by the FIA.

No other car in the field could keep up with the sheer pace of both of the McLaren-Mercedes, with Massa, after a competitive first stint in third place, dropping to sixty seconds behind Hamilton. Notably, he was the only car the two McLaren drivers did not lap during the afternoon.

Kimi Räikkönen came back up the field to eighth place to gain one championship point after his poor qualifying performance.

Vitantonio Liuzzi crashed out of the race on the second lap, a fate that befell Spyker driver Adrian Sutil in the second half of the Grand Prix. The other Spyker car, driven by Christijan Albers failed to finish the race due to a mechanical problem. The only other retirement was Mark Webber, whose Red Bull's gearbox failed in the early stages of the race.

== Classification ==
=== Qualifying ===
Pos.	No.	Driver	Constructor	Q1	Q2	Q3	Grid
1	1	(Spain) Fernando Alonso	McLaren-Mercedes	1:16.059	1:15.431	1:15.726	1
2	2	(United Kingdom) Lewis Hamilton	McLaren-Mercedes	1:15.685	1:15.479	1:15.905	2
3	5	(Brazil) Felipe Massa	Ferrari	1:16.786	1:16.034	1:15.967	3
4	3	(Italy) Giancarlo Fisichella	Renault	1:17.596	1:16.054	1:16.285	4
5	16	(Germany) Nico Rosberg	Williams-Toyota	1:16.870	1:16.100	1:16.439	5
6	15	(Australia) Mark Webber	Red Bull-Renault	1:17.816	1:16.420	1:16.784	6
7	9	(Germany) Nick Heidfeld	BMW Sauber	1:17.385	1:15.733	1:16.832	7
8	10	(Poland) Robert Kubica	BMW Sauber	1:17.584	1:15.576	1:16.955	8
9	8	(Brazil) Rubens Barrichello	Honda	1:17.244	1:16.454	1:17.498	9
10	7	(United Kingdom) Jenson Button	Honda	1:17.297	1:16.457^{3}	1:17.939	10^{3}
11	14	(United Kingdom) David Coulthard	Red Bull-Renault	1:17.204	1:16.319^{3}		13^{3}
12	17	(Austria) Alexander Wurz	Williams-Toyota	1:17.874	1:16.662		11
13	18	(Italy) Vitantonio Liuzzi	Toro Rosso-Ferrari	1:16.720	1:16.703		12
14	12	(Italy) Jarno Trulli	Toyota	1:17.686	1:16.988		14
15	4	(Finland) Heikki Kovalainen	Renault	1:17.836	1:17.125		15
16	6	(Finland) Kimi Räikkönen	Ferrari	1:16.251	No time^{1}		16
17	23	(United Kingdom) Anthony Davidson	Super Aguri-Honda	1:18.250			17
18	19	(United States) Scott Speed	Toro Rosso-Ferrari	1:18.390			18
19	20	(Germany) Adrian Sutil	Spyker-Ferrari	1:18.418			19
20	11	(Germany) Ralf Schumacher	Toyota	1:18.539			20
21	22	(Japan) Takuma Sato	Super Aguri-Honda	1:18.554			21
22	21	(Netherlands) Christijan Albers	Spyker-Ferrari	No time^{1}			22

Notes

- ^1 – Christijan Albers failed to set a time in Q1 due to a hydraulic problem.
- ^2 – Kimi Räikkönen failed to set a time in Q2 driving out of the pool complex into a guardrail, breaking his right front suspension.
- ^3 – David Coulthard was penalised for blocking Heikki Kovalainen and not allowed to take part in Q3 despite posting the 8th fastest time of Q2, he was then given a two place grid penalty and started the race in 13th place. Jenson Button, who had qualified 11th in Q2, therefore inherited the final place in Q3 from Coulthard.

=== Race ===
Pos.	No.	Driver	Constructor	Laps	Time/Retired	Grid	Points
1	1	(Spain) Fernando Alonso	McLaren-Mercedes	78	1:40:29.329	1	10
2	2	(United Kingdom) Lewis Hamilton	McLaren-Mercedes	78	+4.095	2	8
3	5	(Brazil) Felipe Massa	Ferrari	78	+1:09.114	3	6
4	3	(Italy) Giancarlo Fisichella	Renault	77	+1 Lap	4	5
5	10	(Poland) Robert Kubica	BMW Sauber	77	+1 Lap	8	4
6	9	(Germany) Nick Heidfeld	BMW Sauber	77	+1 Lap	7	3
7	17	(Austria) Alexander Wurz	Williams-Toyota	77	+1 Lap	11	2
8	6	(Finland) Kimi Räikkönen	Ferrari	77	+1 Lap	16	1
9	19	(United States) Scott Speed	Toro Rosso-Ferrari	77	+1 Lap	18	
10	8	(Brazil) Rubens Barrichello	Honda	77	+1 Lap	9	
11	7	(United Kingdom) Jenson Button	Honda	77	+1 Lap	10	
12	16	(Germany) Nico Rosberg	Williams-Toyota	77	+1 Lap	5	
13^{4}	4	(Finland) Heikki Kovalainen	Renault	76	Engine	15	
14	14	(United Kingdom) David Coulthard	Red Bull-Renault	76	+2 Laps	13	
15	12	(Italy) Jarno Trulli	Toyota	76	+2 Laps	14	
16	11	(Germany) Ralf Schumacher	Toyota	76	+2 Laps	20	
17	22	(Japan) Takuma Sato	Super Aguri-Honda	76	+2 Laps	21	
18	23	(United Kingdom) Anthony Davidson	Super Aguri-Honda	76	+2 Laps	17	
19^{4}	21	(Netherlands) Christijan Albers	Spyker-Ferrari	70	Driveshaft	22	
Ret	20	(Germany) Adrian Sutil	Spyker-Ferrari	53	Accident	19	
Ret	15	(Australia) Mark Webber	Red Bull-Renault	17	Gearbox	6	
Ret	18	(Italy) Vitantonio Liuzzi	Toro Rosso-Ferrari	1	Accident	12	

Notes

- ^4 – Heikki Kovalainen was classified as 13th and Christijan Albers was classified as 19th, because they completed 90% of the race winner's distance.

== Championship standings after the race ==
Drivers' Championship standings

+/–	Pos.	Driver	Points
1	1	(Spain) Fernando Alonso	38
1	2	(United Kingdom) Lewis Hamilton	38
	3	(Brazil) Felipe Massa	33
	4	(Finland) Kimi Räikkönen	23
	5	(Germany) Nick Heidfeld	18

Constructors' Championship standings

+/–	Pos.	Constructor	Points
	1	(United Kingdom) McLaren-Mercedes	76
	2	(Italy) Ferrari	56
	3	(Germany) BMW Sauber	30
	4	(France) Renault	16
	5	(United Kingdom) Williams-Toyota	7

- Note: Only the top five positions are included for both sets of standings.

== See also ==
- 2007 Monaco GP2 Series round

Previous race: 2007 Spanish Grand Prix	FIA Formula One World Championship; 2007 season	Next race: 2007 Canadian Grand Prix
Previous race: 2006 Monaco Grand Prix	Monaco Grand Prix	Next race: 2008 Monaco Grand Prix
