= Nigel Stepney =

British motor racing mechanic (1958–2014)

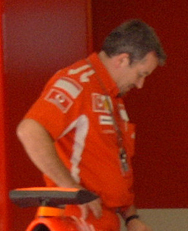
- Stepney at the 2005 Italian Grand Prix
- Born: 14 November 1958; Ufton, Warwickshire, England
- Died: 2 May 2014 (aged 55); Ashford, Kent, England
- Occupation: Mechanic
- Known for: Formula One (Shadow, Lotus, Benetton, Ferrari)

Nigel Stepney (14 November 1958 – 2 May 2014) was a British mechanic. He worked for several teams in Formula One before being appointed chief mechanic at Ferrari. He became a central figure in the 2007 Formula One espionage controversy. Stepney was latterly team manager for Sumo Power.

== Career ==
Stepney was team manager and chief mechanic of JRM Racing, in the FIA World Endurance Championship. He started in Formula One as a mechanic at Shadow in 1977, then followed Elio de Angelis to Lotus before moving to Benetton for the late 1980s and early 1990s and then to Scuderia Ferrari with Michael Schumacher, Rory Byrne, and Ross Brawn. He was chief mechanic at Ferrari and later became race and test technical manager.

At the 2000 Spanish Grand Prix, Stepney was injured during a pit stop for Schumacher's car. This occurred when the German was signalled to depart while Stepney was still detaching the fuel rig. He suffered badly damaged ligaments to his ankle. On 1 February 2007, it was reported on the Internet that Stepney was unhappy with Ferrari's technical restructuring and that he wanted to leave the team, seeking a new challenge. Ferrari's spokesman Luca Colajanni reported on Pitpass' website that he had a contract until the end of the 2007 season and that he was therefore staying at Ferrari. On 23 February 2007, Stepney was promoted to head of the performance development, meaning that he would no longer have to attend races.

=== Espionage allegations ===
On 21 June 2007, it was reported that Stepney was the subject of a criminal inquiry by the Modena district attorney, initiated after Ferrari reportedly made a formal complaint. No reason for the investigation was given, with the specifics of the complaint not being released to the public. A Ferrari spokesman told Reuters: "It is not related to any event; it is related to his behaviour." Stepney was also accused of selling Ferrari parts to competing teams. He denied the accusations and claimed to be the victim of a "dirty tricks campaign".

On 3 July, Stepney was dismissed by Ferrari. Later the same day, Ferrari announced the company was taking legal action against Stepney and McLaren engineer Mike Coughlan. A Ferrari press release stated: "Ferrari announces it has recently presented a case against Nigel Stepney and an engineer from the Vodafone McLaren-Mercedes team with the Modena Tribunal, concerning the theft of technical information. Furthermore, legal action has been instigated in England and a search warrant has been issued concerning the engineer. This produced a positive outcome."

Upon his return from holiday in the Philippines on 5 July, Stepney was interrogated by the Italian police as part of the industrial espionage case. On 6 July, Honda released a statement confirming that Stepney and Coughlan approached the team regarding "job opportunities" in June 2007. Since the revelation of Coughlan's involvement in the affair, McLaren provided a full set of drawings and development documents to the FIA, detailing all updates made to the team's chassis since the incident occurred at the end of April.

=== Investigation and career after Ferrari ===
On 22 January 2008, it was announced that Stepney had been recruited by Gigawave, a manufacturer of on-board racing car camera systems who are also fielding a team in the 2008 FIA GT Championship, as Director of Race Technologies. On 7 March 2008, the FIA issued a statement urging teams and those holding FIA issued licences not to hire Stepney without "conducting appropriate due diligence regarding his suitability for involvement in international motor sport". It further stated:

RECOMMENDATION RE: NIGEL STEPNEY 07.03.2008
"In its investigations of last year regarding the unauthorised use of intellectual property within Formula One, the FIA heard allegations that Mr. Nigel Stepney, then employed by Ferrari, had passed confidential Ferrari information to an employee of Vodafone McLaren Mercedes. Mr. Stepney has admitted this allegation and apologised to the FIA, though he disputes the seriousness and extent of his involvement. As Stepney is not a licence-holder of the FIA, no formal action may be taken against him under the International Sporting Code (though the FIA is co-operating with the Italian police, who are investigating Mr. Stepney's actions). As a matter of good order, the FIA recommends to its licensees that they do not professionally collaborate with Mr. Stepney without conducting appropriate due diligence regarding his suitability for involvement in international motor sport. This recommendation stands until 1 July 2009."

The restriction was lifted on 6 February 2009, with FIA president Max Mosley claiming that Stepney and Coughlan had only been "minor players" in the scandal. On 27 August 2010, Stepney was appointed team manager of the Sumo Power team competing in the FIA GT1 World Championship.

=== Verdict ===
On 29 September 2010, Stepney was sentenced to 1 year 8 months in prison and handed a €600 fine for his part in the spy affair, after being found guilty of "sabotage, industrial espionage, sporting fraud and attempted serious injury". The sentence was reportedly reduced after he entered a plea bargain. Stepney did not serve any time in prison.

== Death ==
Stepney was killed on 2 May 2014 in a road traffic incident on the M20 motorway at Ashford, Kent, United Kingdom. The exact circumstances of his death have not been established. According to police, his vehicle was parked, and he appeared "to have [entered] the carriageway and was then [subsequently] in collision with an articulated goods vehicle". He was pronounced deceased at the scene. A subsequent Coroner's inquest "concluded it was a suicide", but also said they had "found no reason for Mr Stepney to take his own life", and recorded an open conclusion.
