= Mike Coughlan =

British engineer and car designer (born 1959)

- Born: Michael Coughlan; 17 February 1959 (age 67)
- Occupation: Former technical Director of Richard Childress Racing

Michael Coughlan (born 17 February 1959) is a British motor racing engineer and designer. He was Chief Designer for the McLaren Formula One team from 2002 to 2007, where he was suspended for his part in the 2007 Formula One espionage controversy between McLaren and Ferrari, before his contract was subsequently terminated. He was then Chief Technical Officer for Williams F1 from June 2011 to July 2013, before abruptly stepping down "with immediate effect" according to the team.

== Career ==
Coughlan studied mechanical engineering at Brunel University, graduating in 1981.

=== Early career ===
He first designed cars for Tiga Race Cars, which competed in junior formulae, until 1984, when he joined the Lotus Formula One team. As the team's fortunes waned, it was reorganised at the end of 1990, and Coughlan joined John Barnard's design company as it switched between producing chassis for Benetton, Ferrari and Arrows. Barnard parted company with Arrows after falling out with Tom Walkinshaw during the 1998 season, but Coughlan stayed on, taking the role of Technical Director in the following year. When Arrows collapsed in 2002, he was invited to join McLaren.

His A23 car, developed in 2002 for Arrows before the team folded, became the Super Aguri team's SA05 racecar four years later.

=== Ferrari espionage case ===
On 3 July 2007, Coughlan was suspended by McLaren following allegations of espionage against Ferrari. A Ferrari press release said:

Ferrari announces it has recently presented a case against Nigel Stepney and an engineer from the Vodafone McLaren-Mercedes team [named by Autosport.com as Coughlan] with the Modena Tribunal, concerning the theft of technical information. Furthermore, legal action has been instigated in England and a search warrant has been issued concerning the engineer. This produced a positive outcome.

The search warrant is understood to have related to Coughlan's home and the "positive outcome" is reported to be documents claimed to have originated at Ferrari's Maranello factory. Stepney's dismissal from Ferrari had been announced earlier the same day. On 6 July Honda F1 released a statement confirming that Stepney and Coughlan approached the team regarding "job opportunities" in June 2007. Since the revelation of Coughlan's involvement in the affair McLaren provided a full set of drawings and development documents to the FIA, detailing all updates made to the team's chassis since the incident occurred at the end of April.

=== Stefan GP ===
Coughlan worked for Stefan Grand Prix in late 2009 when the Serbian team was trying to gain an entry into Formula One for the 2010 season.

=== Ocelot ===
Coughlan led the design of the composite body of the Ocelot armoured vehicle.

=== Michael Waltrip Racing ===
Coughlan was hired by Michael Waltrip Racing as director of vehicle design where he was responsible for overseeing all design, production, engineering and quality control programs. He left the team prior to the end of his contract to join the Williams Formula One. Michael Waltrip Racing (MWR) sued Coughlan and the Williams F1 team in U.S. District Court in Charlotte. The complaint asserted that Coughlan breached his contract by leaving the team prior to the end of the contract and also asserted that Williams Formula One interfered with the contract by hiring Coughlan. The lawsuit alleged that Coughlan's departure impacted the team's performance, resulting in a loss of prize money and potential sponsorship. Michael Waltrip Racing, Couglan and the Williams F1 team reached a settlement, the terms of which were not disclosed, on 18 October 2011; the lawsuit was dismissed as part of that settlement.

=== Williams Formula One Team ===
On 3 May 2011 it was announced that Coughlan was hired by the Williams F1 team as the chief engineer, in part replacing the then technical director Sam Michael and chief aerodynamicist Jon Tomlinson. After the relative success of 2012, Williams endured a difficult start to the 2013 season, failing to score a point with their FW35 before announcing, on 16 July that Coughlan had been replaced with immediate effect by Pat Symonds. Coughlan's period as chief engineer was dominated by a period of investigation into exhaust driven diffusers, that was described as "a disastrous technical foray".

=== Richard Childress Racing ===
On 9 November 2013, it was announced that Richard Childress Racing had hired Mike Coughlan as the team's new Technical Director, effective immediately. Coughlan was released by Richard Childress Racing in April 2017.
