= Doug McKiernan =

British engineer

- Occupation: Aerodynamics engineer
- Employer: Zero Petroleum
- Title: Chief technical officer

Doug McKiernan is a British Formula One and aerospace aerodynamics engineer. He is currently the chief technical officer at Zero Petroleum which he co-founded alongside Paddy Lowe and Nilay Shah.

== Career ==
McKiernan studied aeronautical engineering at the University of Manchester, where he completed a PhD specialising in computational fluid dynamics. He began his engineering career at BAE Systems, working on advanced wing design projects. Through BAE Systems’ technical partnership with McLaren Racing, McKiernan joined McLaren in 1999 to develop CFD models. After an initial secondment, he made the move permanent and went on to work as a CFD aerodynamicist, wind tunnel aerodynamicist and trackside aerodynamicist within the team’s aerodynamics department.

In 2006, McKiernan was promoted to Principal Aerodynamicist and later to Chief Aerodynamicist, becoming responsible for the aerodynamic design and performance of McLaren’s Formula One cars including the championship winning McLaren MP4-23. He was subsequently appointed chief engineer at McLaren, overseeing technical development and race car performance until his departure from the team at the end of 2014.

In 2018, McKiernan joined Williams Racing as chief engineer. His role later evolved into design and development director, reflecting expanded responsibility across vehicle design, development and performance operations. He left Williams in 2021 amidst a technical restructure.

Following his Formula One career, McKiernan co-founded Zero Petroleum alongside Paddy Lowe, focusing on the development of sustainable synthetic fuels for motorsport and wider transport applications.
