= Simon Lacey (engineer) =

- Born: 9 June 1971 (age 55)
- Education: Cambridge University
- Occupation: Head of Advanced Engineering
- Employer: McLaren Automotive

Simon Lacey (born 9 June 1971) is a British engineer who is currently Head of Advanced Engineering at McLaren Automotive having held senior roles for various Formula One teams.

== Career ==
Lacey graduated from Cambridge University with a degree in engineering, and joined Williams Grand Prix in 1995 as an aerodynamicist. He remained with the team until 1998, being a part of the title winning teams for Damon Hill and Jacques Villeneuve. In 1998, Lacey moved to the newly formed British American Racing team. Lacey would work again with Villeneuve who left Williams to join the outfit, which struggled in its first season. Switching to Honda engines drove more success, with the 2004 season seeing the team finish 2nd in the constructors championship. Lacey remained with the team for 2006, when it transitioned to become the Honda Racing F1 Team.

Lacey left Honda in November 2006 for McLaren where he held the position of head of aerodynamics until 2009. His tenure with McLaren saw him involved with the design of a number of Lewis Hamilton's early F1 cars, including his championship winning MP4-23. In 2010, Lacey transferred from the Formula One department to McLaren's new automotive division. Lacey was part of the team behind the new firms inaugural sportscar the MP4-12C, and was later responsible for the aerodynamic design of the McLaren P1 launched in 2012. He currently holds the role of Head of Advanced Engineering, and in 2021 was part of Autocar Magazines "Drivers of Change" panel.
