= Mark Williams (engineer) =

British engineer

- Born: Mark Richard Williams; April 7, 1959 (age 67); Wolverhampton, Staffordshire, UK
- Education: Imperial College London
- Years active: since 1980
- Known for: Formula One engineer

Mark Richard Williams (born 7 April 1959) is a British engineer. He was known as the engineer for race cars development at McLaren from 1996 until 2015.

== Career ==
Williams attended Imperial College London, where he studied mechanical engineering and graduated in 1980 with a master's degree. His first job in Formula One was as a composite engineer for the Ensign Racing.

In 1982, he became a design engineer for engine components at the engineering technology firm Ricardo Consulting. In his spare time, he worked on freelancing race car design and engineering at Delta Cars, based near Hove.

In 1983, he landed his first full-time job as a race car designer at Lola Cars, working on projects ranging from Formula Ford to IndyCar. He also served as the chief operating officer for the Formula 3000 program from 1985. In 1987, he was responsible as a race engineer for Luis Perez-Sala in the Lola Motorsport F3000 car. Later, in 1994, he worked as a race technician for Forsythe Green Racing in Championship Auto Racing Teams.

In January 1996, he worked with Gordon Murray on the BMW Super Touring Car program, which was run by McLaren Automotive. He eventually became the Head of Vehicle Engineering. At the end of 1997, he moved to the McLaren F1 Team and was in charge of the technical team for many years. In 2001, he was appointed as Chief Engineer of Vehicle Development, overseeing research and development. A highlight of his track role was the car driven by Mika Hakkinen, who served until his last F1 win at Indianapolis in 2001.

In 2002, he worked as Chief Engineer under the technical guidance of Adrian Newey. In 2007, he became the Head of Vehicle Performance. Since 2011, he has successfully combined his F1 responsibilities to establish McLaren's growing GT3 sports car program.

He retired from his F1 job in January 2015 and ran a consulting firm called MW Consulting, until dissolved in 2021.
