= Andy Cowell =

British engineer

- Born: Andrew Cowell; 12 February 1969 (age 57)
- Occupation: Engineer
- Known for: Formula One engineer
- Spouse: Sarah Cowell

Andrew Cowell (born 12 February 1969) is a British Formula One engineer. He is the Chief Strategy Officer at Aston Martin, having previously been the CEO and Team Principal. He is a fellow of the IMechE and the Royal Academy of Engineering.

== Career ==
=== Cosworth/BMW Motorsport ===
Cowell studied Mechanical Engineering at Lancaster University (Grizedale College), and joined Cosworth on their graduate scheme straight and then worked his way through the company’s various technical departments before specialising in the design and development of Formula One engines. By 1998, Cowell was responsible for the engineering project group for the top end of the innovative CK engine, which powered Stewart Grand Prix to a win in 1999. He spent a year with BMW Motorsport in 2000, steering the engineering group that designed the 2001 BMW-Williams engine.

Cowell returned to Cosworth as Principal Engineer for F1 design and development in 2001, managing new engine projects in 2001 and 2003, before joining Mercedes-Ilmor in 2004 as Principal Engineer for the FQ V10 engine project. He worked as Chief Engineer on Ilmor’s V8 engine project before taking on oversight for the technical and programme leadership of all engine projects – including the KERS Hybrid system, which debuted in 2009.

=== Mercedes-AMG High Performance Powertrains (2008–2020) ===
Cowell subsequently was the Engineering Director for Mercedes-Benz High Performance Engines from July 2008 to January 2013, responsible for technical and programme leadership of all engine and powertrain projects, including the organisation and strategy of the engineering group. In January 2013, Cowell became the Managing Director of Mercedes AMG High Performance Powertrains, replacing Thomas Fuhr. It was in this role in which he oversaw development of the innovative PU106A V6 Hybrid Power Unit; which went on to successfully power the 2014 championship-winning F1 W05 Hybrid and was unanimously considered to be the best powertrain in the first year of the turbo-hybrid era.

Under Cowell's stewardship, Mercedes AMG High Performance Powertrains has powered the Mercedes works team to 12 world titles in six years, winning both the Drivers’ and Constructors’ Championships in 2014, 2015, 2016, 2017, 2018, 2019 and 2020. In June 2020 Cowell left Mercedes to seek a new challenge, he was succeeded by Hywel Thomas.

=== Aston Martin (2024–present) ===
In July 2024, it was announced that Cowell would be joining Aston Martin as the new Group CEO, taking over from Martin Whitmarsh who subsequently departed Aston Martin.

In January 2025, Cowell was announced to take over the role of Team Principal of the team from 2025 from Mike Krack who was moved to the role of Chief Trackside Officer.

In November 2025, Aston Martin announced that Cowell was moved to the role of Chief Strategy Officer to focus on Aston Martin’s works partnership with Honda from 2026. In his place, Managing Technical Partner Adrian Newey will take over the role of Team Principal from 2026 whilst continuing to lead to the technical team, with Chief Trackside Officer and former Team Principal Mike Krack leading the team for the remaining races in Qatar and Abu Dhabi as Acting Team Principal due to Cowell no longer being at the trackside.

== Personal life ==
Andy is married to Sarah Cowell and they have two teenage sons.

Sarah is often seen accompanying Andy at events, such as the private screening of the 2025 F1 film in Monaco and race weekends supporting Andy professionally and personally.
