= McLaren MP4-27 =

Formula One car for 2012 season

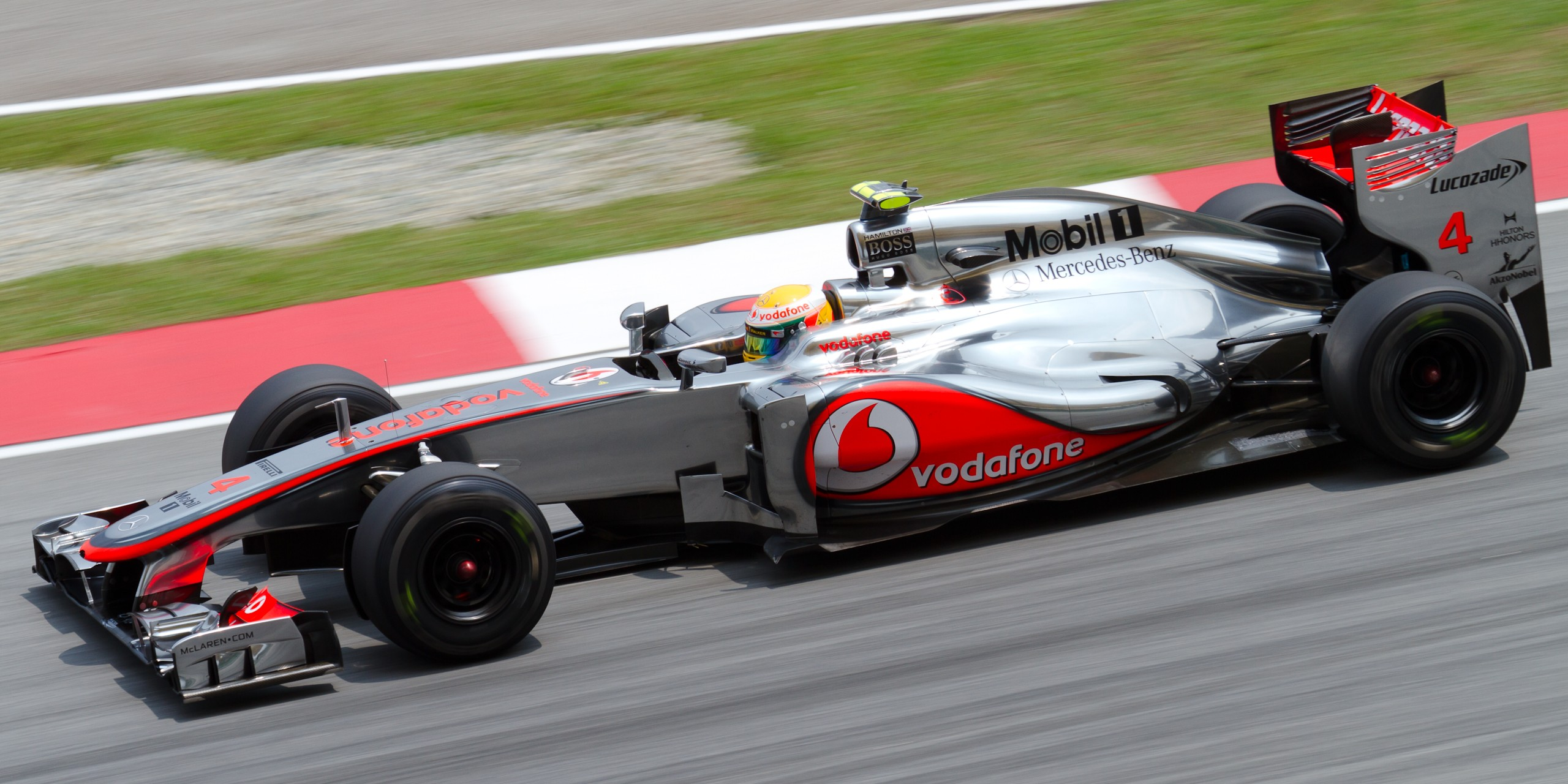
- Lewis Hamilton driving the MP4-27 at the Malaysian Grand Prix
- Category: Formula One
- Constructor: McLaren
- Designers: Neil Oatley (Executive Engineer); Paddy Lowe (Technical Director); Tim Goss (Engineering Director); Mark Williams (Head of Vehicle Engineering); Andrew Bailey (Head of Vehicle Design); Sam Purvis (Project Leader); John Iley (Head of Aerodynamics); Doug McKiernan (Chief Aerodynamicist)
- Predecessor: McLaren MP4-26
- Successor: McLaren MP4-28

Technical specifications
- Chassis: Moulded carbon fibre composite monocoque incorporating front and side impact structures
- Suspension (front): Inboard torsion bar/damper system operated by pushrod and bell crank with a double wishbone arrangement
- Suspension (rear): Inboard torsion bar/damper system operated by pullrod and bell crank with a double wishbone arrangement
- Engine: Mercedes-Benz FO 108Z 2.4 L (146 cu in) V8 (90°). Naturally aspirated, 18,000 RPM limited with KERS, mid-mounted.
- Transmission: McLaren 7-speed + 1 reverse sequential seamless semi-automatic paddle shift with epicyclic differential and multi-plate limited slip clutch
- Weight: 640 kg (1,411 lb) (including driver)
- Fuel: ExxonMobil High Performance Unleaded (5.75% bio fuel); Mobil Synergy Fuel System; Mobil 1 lubrication
- Tyres: Pirelli P Zero (dry), Cinturato (wet); Enkei wheels (front and rear)

Competition history
- Notable entrants: Vodafone McLaren Mercedes
- Notable drivers: 3. (United Kingdom) Jenson Button; 4. (United Kingdom) Lewis Hamilton
- Debut: 2012 Australian Grand Prix
- First win: 2012 Australian Grand Prix
- Last win: 2012 Brazilian Grand Prix
- Last event: 2012 Brazilian Grand Prix
Races	Wins	Podiums	Poles	F/Laps
20	7	13	8	3

The McLaren MP4-27 is a Formula One racing car designed by Vodafone McLaren Mercedes for the 2012 Formula One season. The chassis was designed by Paddy Lowe, Neil Oatley, Tim Goss, Andrew Bailey and John Iley and was powered by a customer Mercedes-Benz engine. The car was driven by former World Champions Jenson Button and Lewis Hamilton. It was launched on 1 February at the McLaren team base in Woking, Surrey, ahead of the first winter test sessions at Jerez de la Frontera. This was the last McLaren car that Lewis Hamilton drove for the team, as he moved to the Mercedes AMG Petronas F1 Team in 2013. This was also the last McLaren Formula One car to win a race until the McLaren MCL35M did so in 2021 and the last to win more than one Grand Prix in a season until the MCL38 of 2024.

The car achieved 7 wins, 8 poles and third place in the Constructors' Championship in 2012.

== Design ==
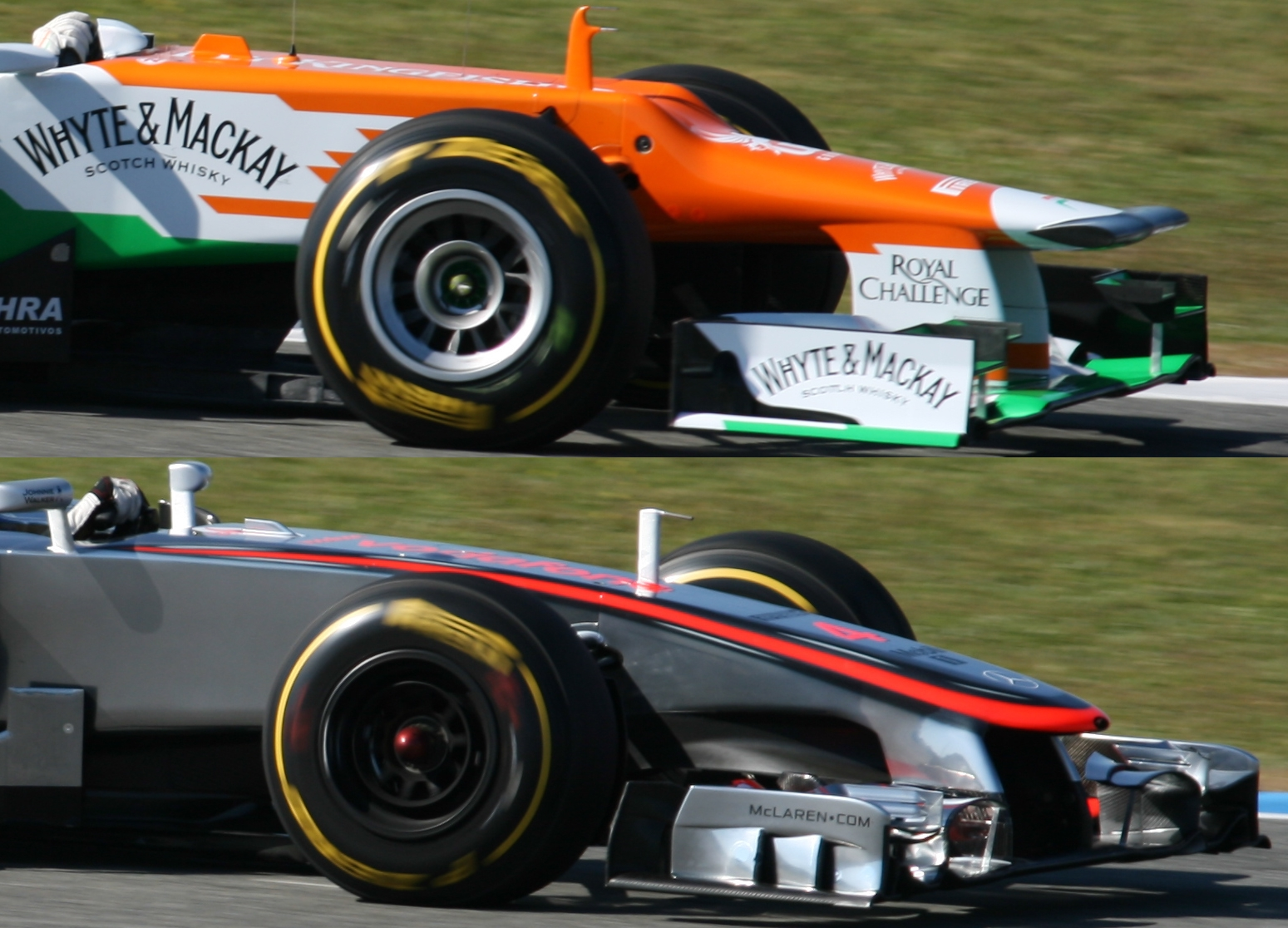
The MP4-27's nose (bottom) compared with that of Force India's VJM05 (top), a more typical design of 2012-specification cars

The MP4-27 was one of three 2012 cars not to have the so-called "platypus" nose, instead opting for a gradual sloped nose. The Marussia F1 MR01 and HRT F112 also had a similar low nose; the F112 featured a less pronounced step in the nose of the car compared to others on the grid, however, incorporating the two ideas of regulation compliance into the same car.

== Season summary ==
=== Opening rounds ===
After the struggles McLaren experienced in the build-up to the 2009 and 2011 seasons, the MP4-27 demonstrated early promise in testing. This was confirmed at the first race of the season in Australia, when Lewis Hamilton and Jenson Button qualified first and second for the race, the team's first since the 2009 European Grand Prix. Button went on to win the race, with Hamilton finishing third despite team principal Martin Whitmarsh's admission that the team had made a mistake in calculating Button's fuel load, forcing the 2009 World Champion to enter a "severe fuel-saving mode" on the eighth lap of the race.

The car showed the best pace of the field again at the Malaysian Grand Prix, once again taking first and second in qualifying, with Hamilton on pole. Wet weather conditions during the race created unpredictable results with both cars maintaining their positions until the race was stopped early After the race was restarted Button broke his front wing and fell out of the points, whilst Hamilton finished third.

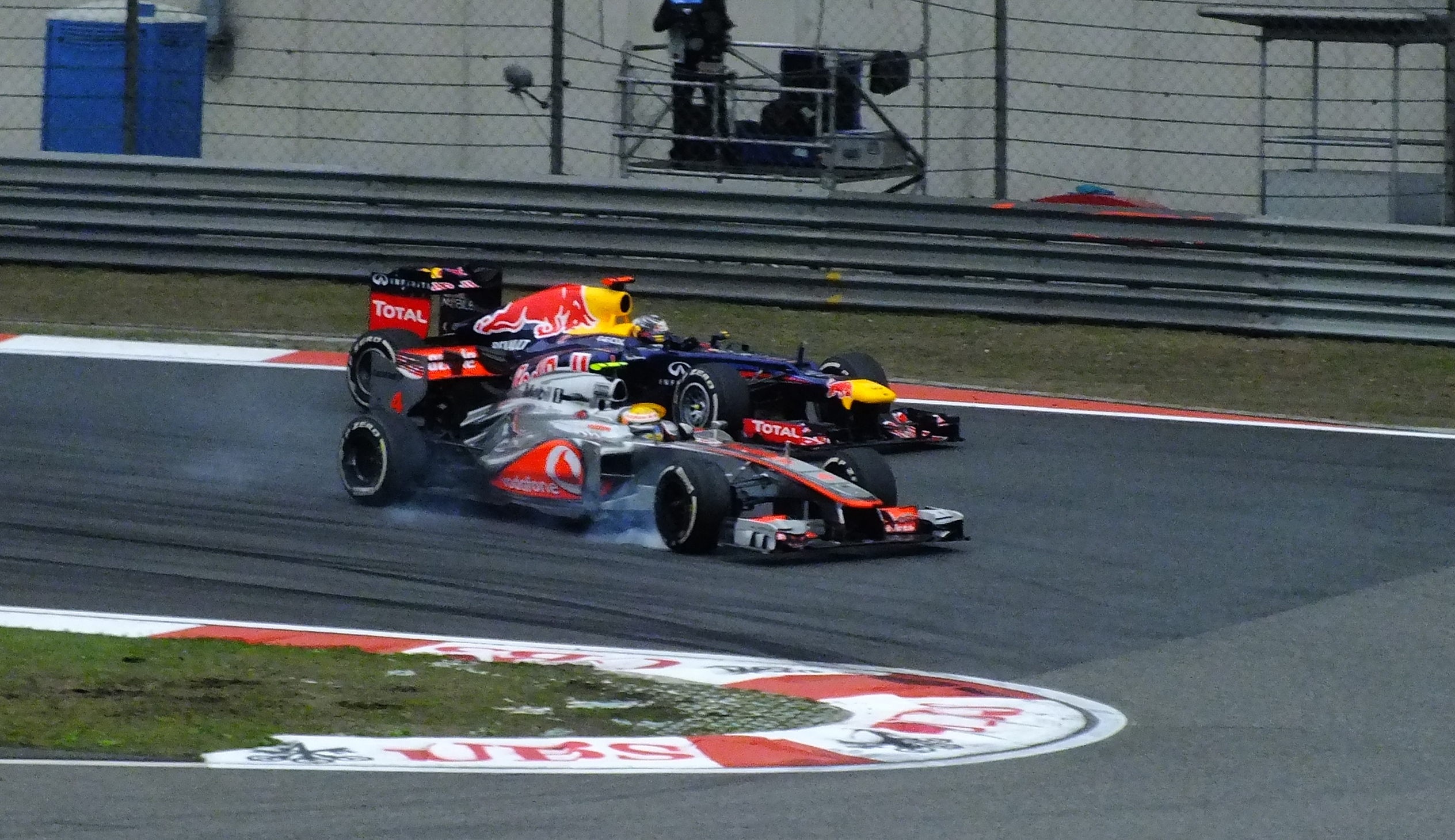
Hamilton racing against Sebastian Vettel at the Chinese Grand Prix

At the Chinese Grand Prix, the Mercedes cars found pace, allowing Nico Rosberg to take his first pole and win. Button started fifth and finished second; Hamilton initially qualified second, but a gearbox change set him back to seventh before he fought through to third place. The result put Hamilton into the lead of the drivers' standings after his third successive third place in the first three races. Button moved up to second, two points behind Hamilton.

The next three races were poor for the team, especially Button as the car seemed to lose the performance advantage it held at the start of the season. In the Bahrain Grand Prix, Hamilton finished in eighth and Button retired whilst running in seventh, with the former being compromised by a slow pit stop. Consequently, the team lost their lead in the constructors' standings for the first time in 2012 to Red Bull, whilst Vettel won the race and overtook Hamilton to lead the drivers' standings.

=== European and Canadian rounds ===
In Spain, Hamilton finished eighth (although he had to fight through the field after being demoted from pole position to the back of the grid when his car ran out of fuel on the in-lap) and Button finished ninth. Mark Webber won the Monaco Grand Prix, whilst Hamilton started third but finished a close fifth. Button started from twelfth and fell to fourteenth for much of the race before eventually retiring, for his third finish with no points in 2012. The car was also fitted with a much higher front wing starting from that race onwards.

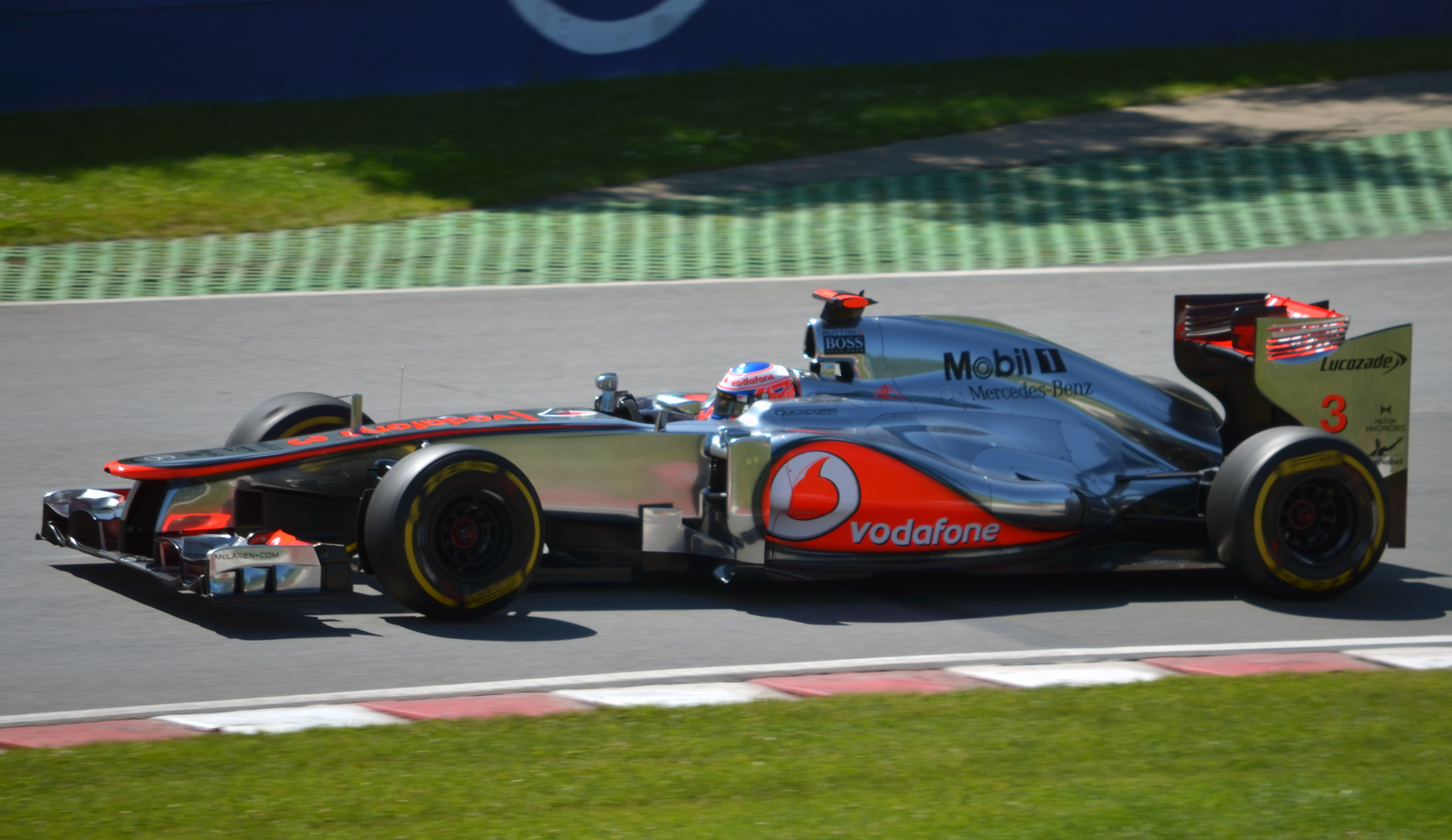
Button at the Canadian Grand Prix

The Canadian Grand Prix brought mixed results in qualifying and the race. Hamilton qualified second, while Button qualified tenth due to a tyre strategy error. Hamilton became the seventh different driver to win a race in seven races after he finished first, at the same time getting a podium finish for the first time since the Chinese Grand Prix. Button continued his dismal form by finishing 16th as he struggled due to tyre problems which resulted in a complete lack of pace in a track which he won last year.

However, the European Grand Prix and the British Grand Prix proved disappointing for the team once again. In Valencia, despite Hamilton's send place in qualifying, he was unable to match the pace of Vettel and Alonso in the race and then during his 2nd pit stop, the front jack failed, causing him a delayed pit-stop. To top off his day, he collided with Pastor Maldonado while battling for third place and hit the wall in the closing stages of the race, ending his chances of a podium finish. Button could only manage eighth after starting ninth, again struggling with tyres. The British Grand Prix was a nightmare for the team. Hamilton could only manage eighth, while Button qualified 18th, but was promoted to 16th due to penalties of Kamui Kobayashi and Vergne from Toro Rosso. Hamilton eventually finished eighth, while Button finished in tenth. It became clear that the car might need significant updates before the German Grand Prix so as to improve recent poor results and get back to winning ways.

However, despite the upgrades, the cars lacked grip in qualifying due to wet weather at the German Grand Prix. Button outqualified Hamilton for the first time in 2012, in seventh while Hamilton is right behind in eighth. Both drivers were promoted to sixth and seventh respectively due to Mark Webber's gearbox change which resulted in a 5-place grid drop. In the race, Button who was running second after the second pit stop, struggled to match both Alonso's and Vettel's pace due to flat spotting a tyre and was overtaken by Vettel in the penultimate lap in turn 6. However, the manner which Vettel overtook is deemed to be illegal as all 4 wheels have been out of the track to overtake. Vettel was giving a time penalty, demoting him to fifth place while Button was promoted back to an impressive send place. Hamilton's 100th F1 race was disastrous. He lost a few positions after a poor start and then suffered a puncture on Lap 3, ending his chances for a points-scoring finish. But he unlapped himself by overtaking Vettel and compromising his race. He then retired on Lap 56 after a mechanical failure in his car.

During the Hungarian Grand Prix, the efficiency of the upgrades finally showed as the qualifying session was held in dry weather. Lewis Hamilton recovered after the disappointment in the German Grand Prix, he was dominant in every practice and qualifying, achieving McLaren's 150th pole position. Button qualified in fourth. Hamilton would go on to win the race, while Button finished a disappointing sixth.

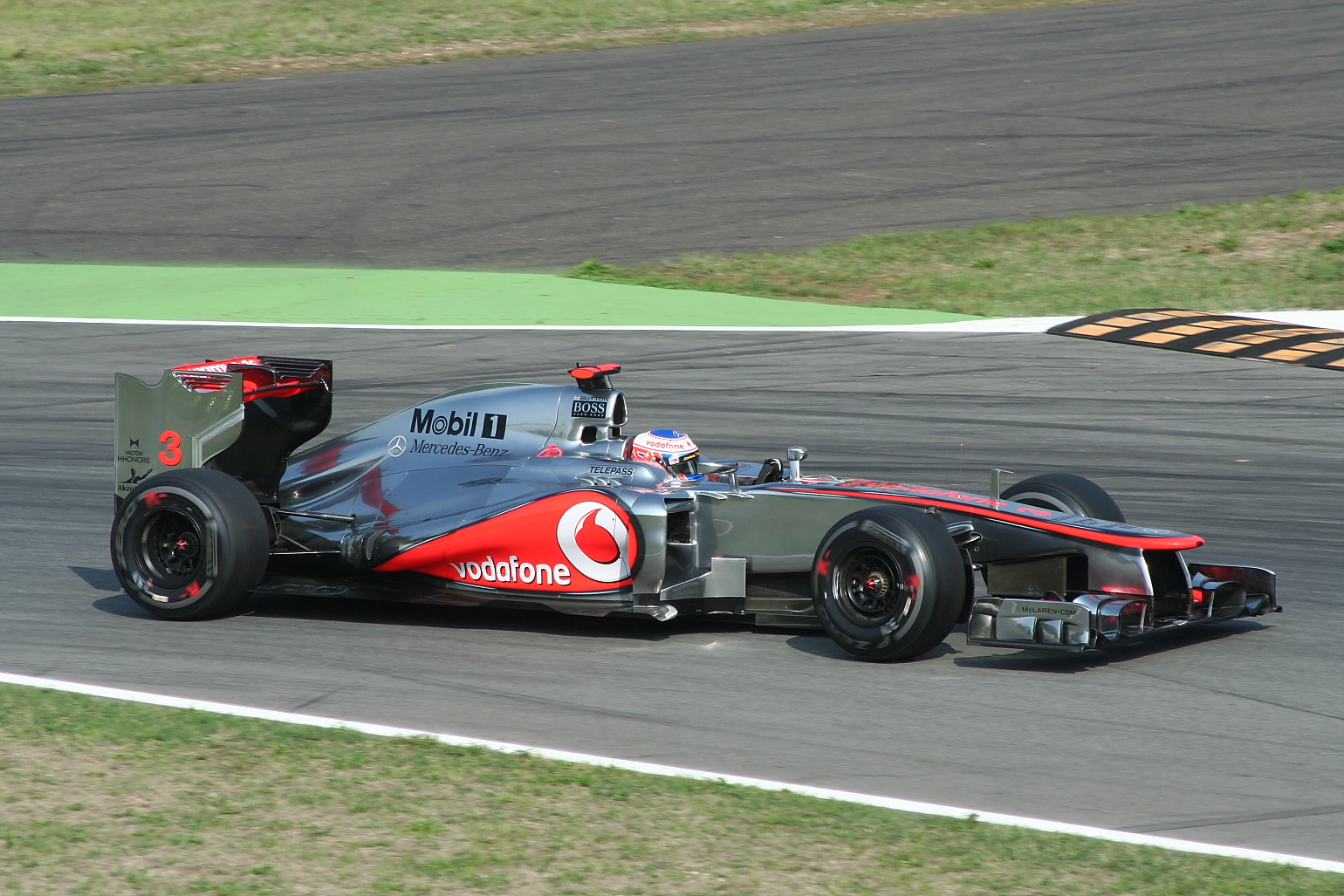
Button at the Italian Grand Prix, where he took second but ended up retiring during the race

The season resumed with the Belgian Grand Prix after the summer break. Button qualified on pole and would dominate the race to take his 14th career victory, his first time at Circuit de Spa-Francorchamps. Hamilton had a horrible weekend after starting eighth and was involved in a first lap collision, ending his race at the first corner. The team had strong qualifying session at the Italian Grand Prix, with Hamilton starting on pole and Button right behind. Hamilton would go on to take his first victory in Monza while Button had to retire due to sudden loss of fuel pressure.

=== Asian rounds ===
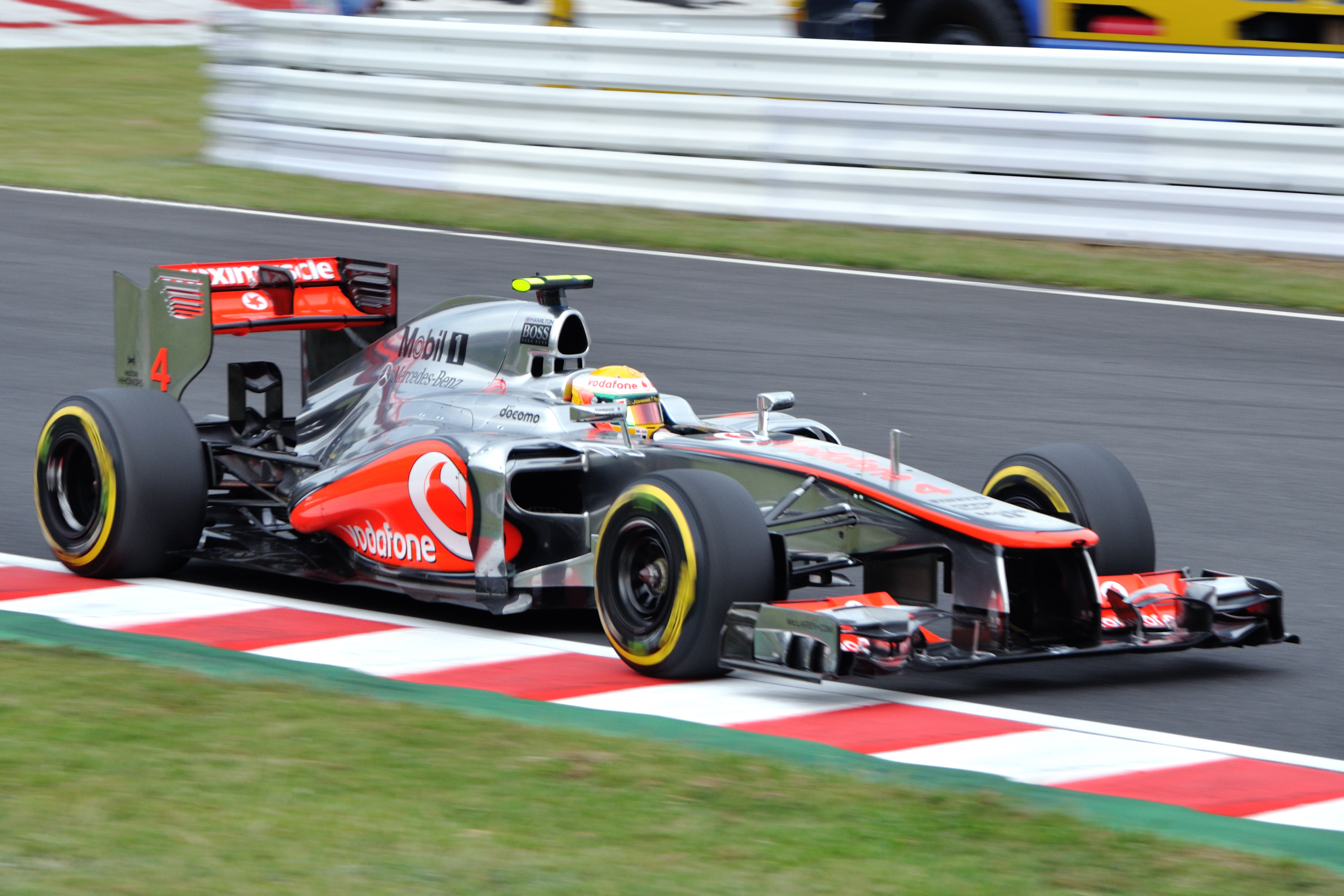
Hamilton took fifth at the Japanese Grand Prix after starting from ninth

In Singapore, Hamilton was unable to convert his pole advantage into a victory due to a gearbox failure during the race. Button, who started fourth would finish the race in second behind Vettel. Button outqualified Hamilton for the Japanese Grand Prix with the former starting third while the latter in ninth. Hamilton would finish in fifth, behind Button, who missed out on the podium by finishing behind Kobayashi. Hamilton started the Korean Grand Prix third with Button in 11th following a Q2 exit. Hamilton was overtaken by Alonso in the opening laps and fell into fourth. McLaren endured another difficult race with Hamilton's championship aspiration took a hard blow after finishing tenth due to rear suspension failure, and Button's race ended with contact with Sauber's Kobayashi on the first lap. By this point, Ferrari had overtaken them for second in the constructors' championship with six points separating them. Despite the two were still being within mathematical chance of securing the championship, Hamilton and Button stated that their championship hopes are over.

The Indian Grand Prix saw Hamilton starting from third with Button right behind. During the race, Hamilton was unable to overtake Webber who suffered a problem with his KERS and had to settle for fourth. Button's fifth-place finish meant that his championship hopes are mathematically over.

Hamilton secured pole position for the Abu Dhabi Grand Prix but reliability issues returned, forcing Hamilton to retire and drop out of contention for the title. Button finished the race in fourth after starting from fifth. As a result, McLaren further trail behind Ferrari with 22 points.

=== Closing rounds ===
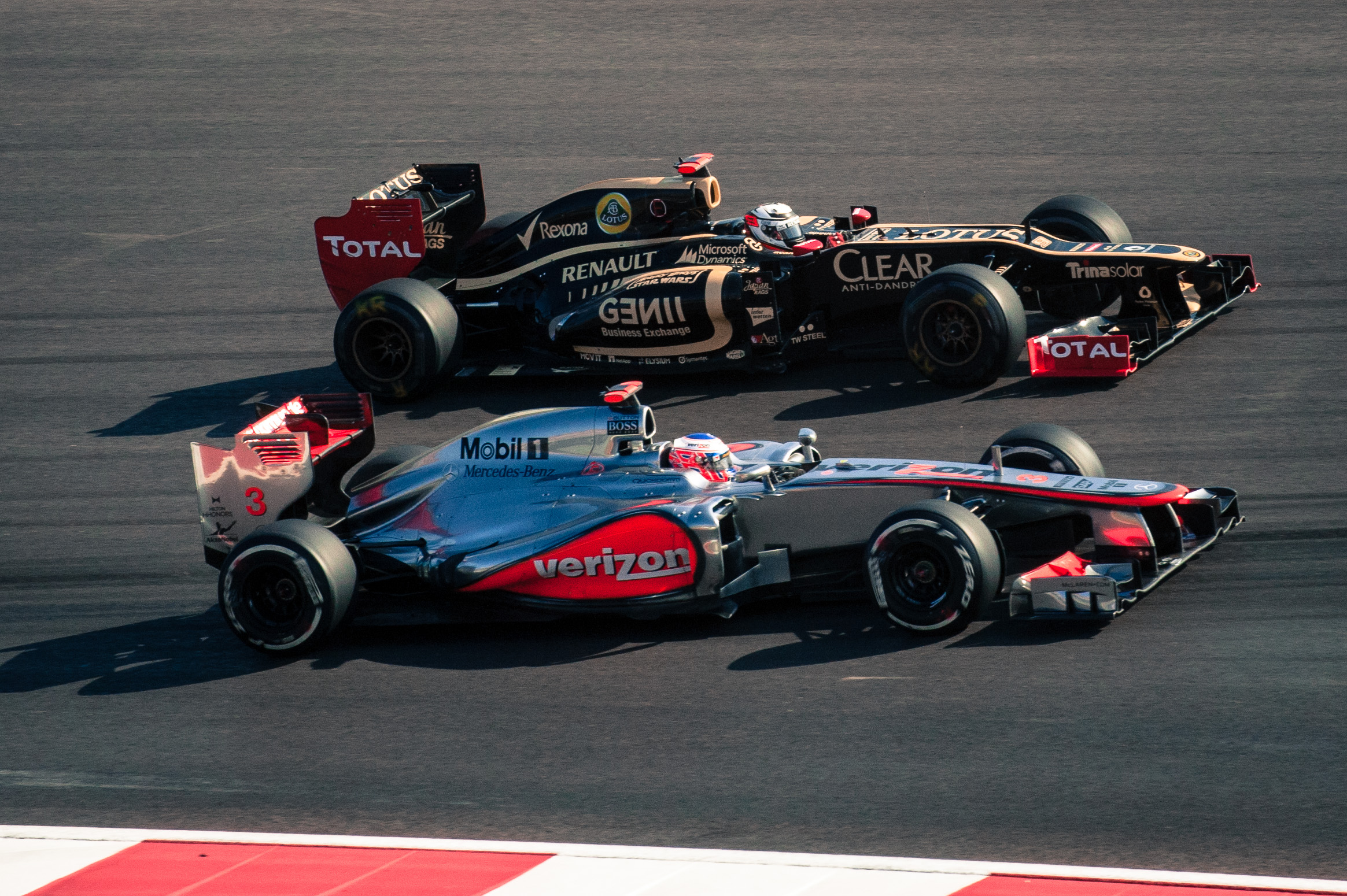
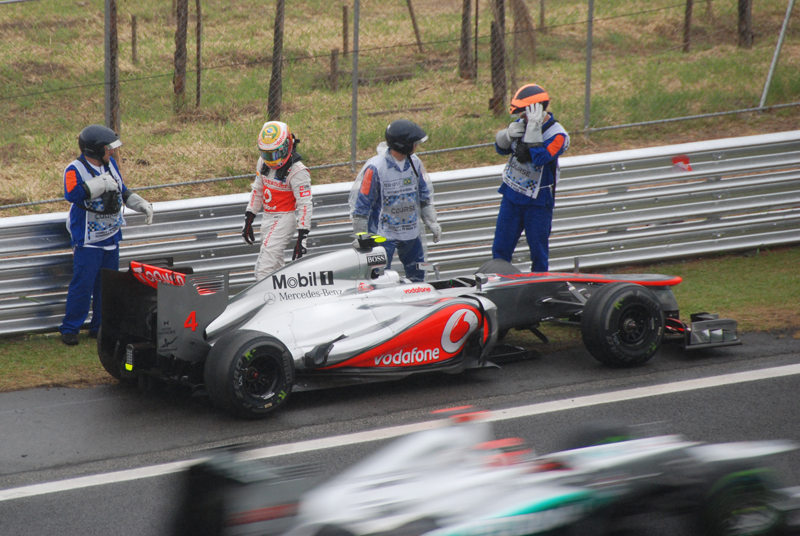
Button battling against Lotus' Räikkönen at the United States Grand Prix. The MP4-27 featured a Verizon logo instead of Vodafone for this race. Hamilton's last race with McLaren in Brazil ended with a retirement.

Hamilton qualified second for the United States Grand Prix behind Vettel. Button had another Q2 exit that saw him starting from 12th. Hamilton would go on to take the victory at the new Circuit of the Americas, and claimed that the race "is one of the best, if not, the best Grand Prix we've had all year." Button recovered to come home in fifth.

McLaren secured a front-row lockout with Hamilton securing his final pole position with the team at the Brazilian Grand Prix. A contact with Nico Hülkenberg when the two were battling for the lead on lap 54 forced Hamilton into retirement for his last race for McLaren. Button's victory at the action-packed finale elevated him to finish 5th above Webber in the drivers' standings. The result serves as a small consolation for a mixed season for the team, as they also lost 2nd place to Ferrari in the Constructors' Championship.

== Sponsorship and livery ==
McLaren used Vodafone logos in all races except in the United States where it was replaced by Verizon. Lucozade logo will appear on the car’s rear wing from the start of the season up to the British Grand Prix, after which the sports nutrition brand Maximuscle will sponsor the rear wing from the German Grand Prix until the end of the season with the exception of the Indian Grand Prix, where it was replaced by Boost branding. At the Bahrain and Abu Dhabi Grand Prix, the Johnnie Walker logo was replaced by Hilton Honors.

McLaren used sponsorship of Tooned, a CGI animated series based on the team, from Hungarian Grand Prix onwards.

McLaren celebrated 300 races with Mobil 1, Mercedes-Benz and Enkei at the Canadian Grand Prix.

As part of McLaren’s marketing strategy, the team often leveraged local brands and short-term, country-specific sponsorship agreements during a given nation’s Grand Prix to gain regional exposure, with the sponsors' logos appearing on the sides of the car’s cockpit.

- Australia: Blueprint Group
- Bahrain: Zain
- Spanish: Mobile World Capital Barcelona
- Monaco: Into Telecom
- Canada: Quickcomm
- European: Belconobras
- British: RAA
- German: RTL - Wir helfen Kindern
- Hungary: Fornetti
- Belgian: Telecom Service Groep
- Italian: Telepass
- Singapore: StarHub
- Japan: NTT Docomo
- Korea: Olleh LTE Warp
- India: Sequel Logistics
- Abu Dhabi: Qnbn
- United States: Quickcomm

== Complete Formula One results ==
(key) (results in bold indicate pole position; results in italics indicate fastest lap)

Year	Entrant	Engine	Tyres	Drivers	1	2	3	4	5	6	7	8	9	10	11	12	13	14	15	16	17	18	19	20	Points	WCC
2012	Vodafone McLaren Mercedes	Mercedes-Benz; FO 108Z	**P**		AUS	MAL	CHN	BHR	ESP	MON	CAN	EUR	GBR	GER	HUN	BEL	ITA	SIN	JPN	KOR	IND	ABU	USA	BRA	**378**	**3rd**
2012	Vodafone McLaren Mercedes	Mercedes-Benz; FO 108Z	**P**	(United Kingdom) Jenson Button	1	14	2	18^{†}	9	16^{†}	16	8	10	2	6	**1**	Ret	2	4	Ret	5	4	5	1	**378**	**3rd**
2012	Vodafone McLaren Mercedes	Mercedes-Benz; FO 108Z	**P**	(United Kingdom) Lewis Hamilton	**3**	**3**	3	8	8	5	1	19^{†}	8	Ret	**1**	Ret	**1**	**Ret**	5	10	4	**Ret**	1	**Ret**	**378**	**3rd**

^{†} Driver failed to finish the race, but was classified as they had completed greater than 90% of the race distance.
