= McLaren MP4-28 =

Formula One car for 2013 season

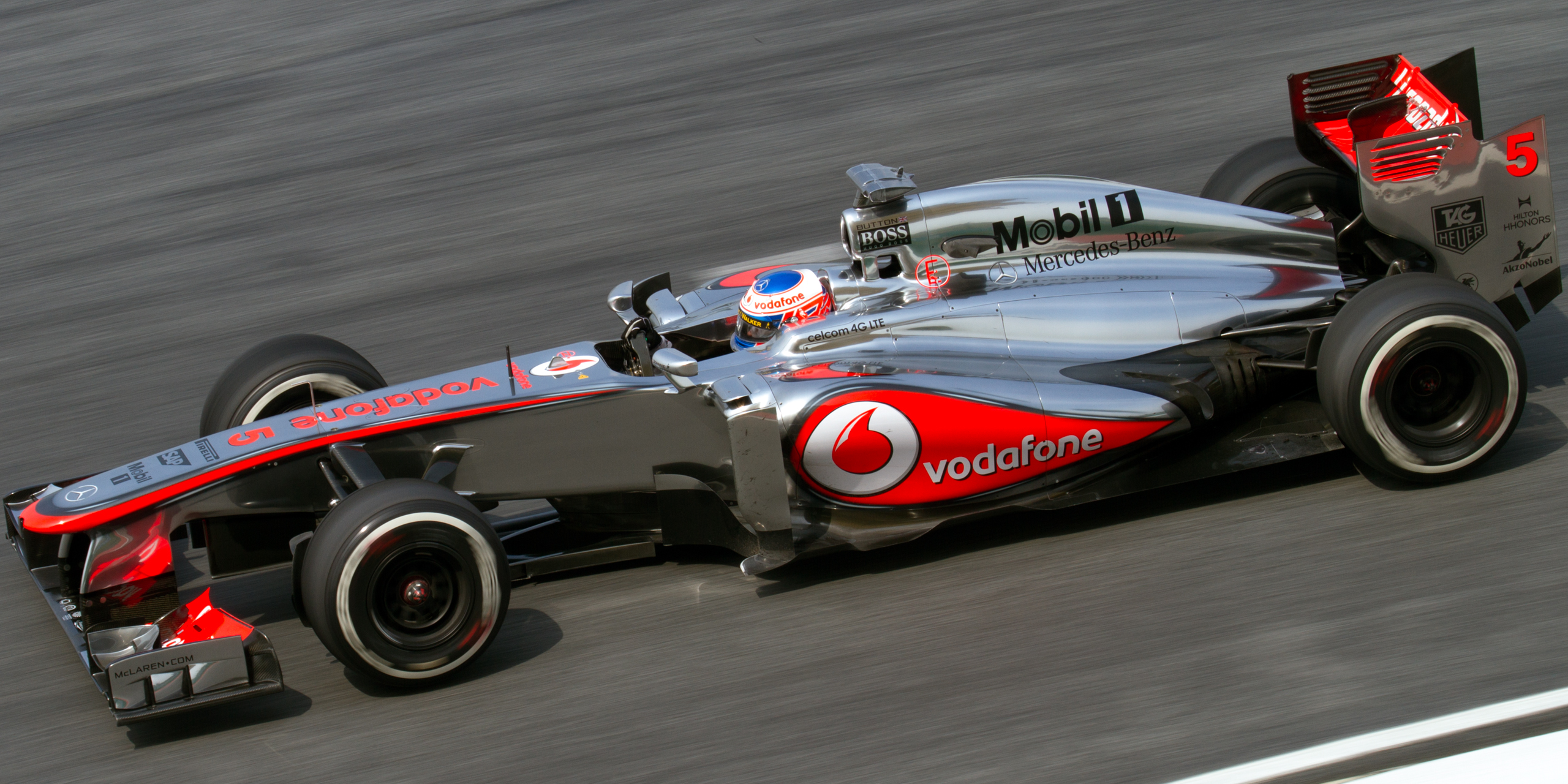
- Jenson Button driving the MP4-28 at the Malaysian Grand Prix
- Category: Formula One
- Constructor: McLaren
- Designers: Neil Oatley (Executive Engineer); Paddy Lowe (Technical Director); Tim Goss (Engineering Director); Mark Williams (Head of Vehicle Engineering); Mark Ingham (Head of Vehicle Design); Sam Purvis (Project Leader); Marcin Budkowski (Head of Aerodynamics); Doug McKiernan (Chief Aerodynamicist)
- Predecessor: McLaren MP4-27
- Successor: McLaren MP4-29

Technical specifications
- Chassis: Moulded carbon fibre composite monocoque incorporating front and side impact structures with honeycomb structure
- Suspension (front): Inboard torsion bar/damper system operated by pullrod and bell crank with a double wishbone arrangement. KONI dampers
- Suspension (rear): as front
- Length: 5,080 mm (200 in)
- Width: 1,800 mm (71 in)
- Height: 950 mm (37 in)
- Engine: Mercedes-Benz FO 108F 2.4 L (146 cu in) V8 (90°). Naturally aspirated, 18,000 RPM limited with KERS, mid-mounted
- Transmission: McLaren 7-speed + 1 reverse sequential seamless semi-automatic paddle shift with epicyclic differential and multi-plate limited slip clutch
- Weight: 642 kg (1,415 lb) (including driver)
- Fuel: ExxonMobil High Performance Unleaded (5.75% bio fuel); Mobil Synergy Fuel System; Mobil 1 lubrication
- Tyres: Pirelli P Zero dry slick and Pirelli Cinturato treaded intermediate and wet tyres Enkei 13" magnesium racing wheels
- Clutch: AP Racing electro-hydraulically operated, carbon multi-plate

Competition history
- Notable entrants: Vodafone McLaren Mercedes
- Notable drivers: 5. (United Kingdom) Jenson Button; 6. (Mexico) Sergio Pérez
- Debut: 2013 Australian Grand Prix
- Last event: 2013 Brazilian Grand Prix
Races	Wins	Podiums	Poles	F/Laps
19	0	0	0	1

The McLaren MP4-28 is a Formula One racing car designed and built by the McLaren team for use in the 2013 Formula One season. The chassis was designed by Paddy Lowe, Neil Oatley, Tim Goss, Mark Ingham and Marcin Budkowski and was powered by a customer Mercedes-Benz engine. It was driven by 2009 World Champion Jenson Button and Sergio Pérez, the latter joining the team after Lewis Hamilton moved to Mercedes. The car was launched on 31 January 2013, as part of the team's fiftieth anniversary celebrations.

The MP4-28 resulted in McLaren's worst Formula 1 performance for 33 years. It was their first season without finishing on the podium since 1980, and they never qualified in the top five - their worst since 1983. It was also the team's first season without a win since 2006 when the team raced with the MP4-21. This was also the last McLaren to feature title sponsorship from telecommunications company Vodafone on the livery as this sponsorship arrangement would end at the end of the season thus concluding a partnership that began in 2007 on the MP4-22.

== Design ==
The MP4-28 features significant revisions compared to the MP4-27 as the team felt that the MP4-27 had reached the end of its development cycle, and that starting over would give the MP4-28 a wider scope for development. A pullrod front suspension similar to that of the Ferrari F2012 was introduced, the sidepods were revised to improve airflow over the rear of the car, while the rear suspension geometry was reconfigured to be more aerodynamic whilst incorporating a wishbone system designed to manage rear tyre wear by adding camber to the rear wheels as the speed increases, and relax as the car decelerates. The car's centre of gravity was altered by reducing the weight of the rollhoop and engine cover, allowing the team to raise the car's nose. The profile of the chassis was streamlined with the addition of a "vanity plate" to cover the "stepped" design seen throughout 2012. By contrast, the Lotus E21 was launched without a vanity plate, as the team felt that it was a purely cosmetic feature that added unnecessary weight; McLaren, on the other hand, described the weight change and aerodynamic benefits as a "non-issue".

By the team's own admission, the launch version of the MP4-28 contained some parts—including the exhaust, floor and front wing assembly—that had been carried over from its predecessor, the MP4-27, but new parts would be added throughout the winter testing programme. Despite the outward similarities to the MP4-27, Jenson Button described the internal design of the MP4-28 as having been completely re-worked.

== Testing ==
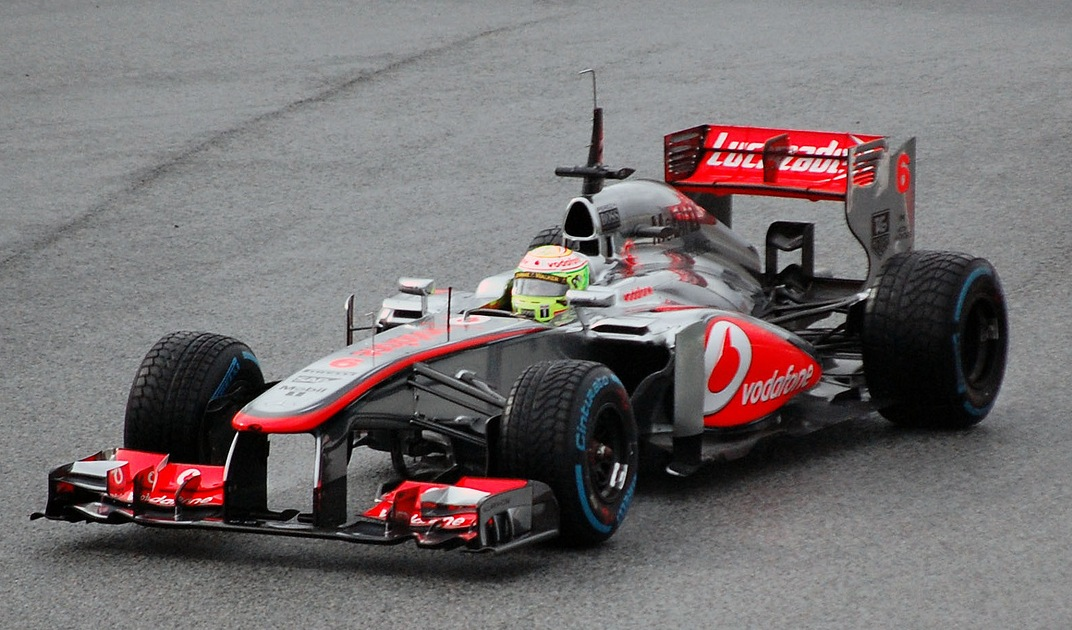
Pérez in the MP4-28 during winter tests at Jerez, in 2013

The MP4-28 displayed significant speed during winter testing at Jerez de la Frontera, leading to speculation that the car would be an early championship contender. However, it was soon discovered that this speed was a result of a suspension component being incorrectly fitted on Jenson Button's car, which created an extremely low ride height that in turn led to the fast lap times. The team was forced to install the offending part properly as continuing to run the car in such a configuration would prove to be impossible.

== Competition history ==
The McLaren MP4-28 faced a difficult debut in Australia, with the team admitting that they did not truly understand the way the car behaved under race conditions. Button qualified in tenth place, whilst Pérez started in fifteenth. Button and Pérez went on to finish the race in ninth and eleventh place respectively, on the lead lap, but some eighty seconds behind race winner Kimi Räikkönen. Button was critical of the car, claiming that it could not win a Grand Prix without extensive development work. Following the race, team principal Martin Whitmarsh described his willingness to abandon the MP4-28 altogether and instead revert to using the McLaren MP4-27 if the team felt they could not solve the MP4-28's issues, but that the team's preference was to concentrate on developing the MP4-28 for the time being.

At the next race in Malaysia, the team expressed confidence that they could improve the car, claiming that the bumpy nature of the Melbourne Grand Prix Circuit had exaggerated the car's flaws, and so were expecting the smoother surface of the Sepang circuit to be much more representative of the car's performance. Jenson Button qualified eighth and briefly led the race, until a mistake during his final pit stop cost him several positions. The team decided to retire the car instead of continue, and Button was ultimately classified seventeenth as he had completed 90% of the race distance. Sergio Pérez qualified tenth and finished ninth overall, setting the fastest lap time after making an unscheduled stop late in the race. The team recovered in China, with Button finishing fifth overall and the ten points he received elevating the team from seventh to fifth place in the World Constructors' Championship, drawing level with Force India. Both Button and Pérez scored points at the Bahrain Grand Prix, ahead of the car's first major updates in Spain. Despite the team playing down the expected gains from the upgrades, the package nevertheless proved to be disappointing, and McLaren elected to postpone the introduction of some parts amid concerns about their legality. Button and Pérez finished the race in eighth and ninth place respectively, with Button describing the team's performances as being "a bit embarrassing" and admitting that whatever gains the team had made had been marginalised by the development schedules of other teams, who had also used the race to introduce their first major updates for the season. Commentators noted that during the race, Button's fastest lap time was just five hundredths of a second faster than Max Chilton's best lap time set in the Marussia MR02, a car that qualified on the back row of the grid for the race.

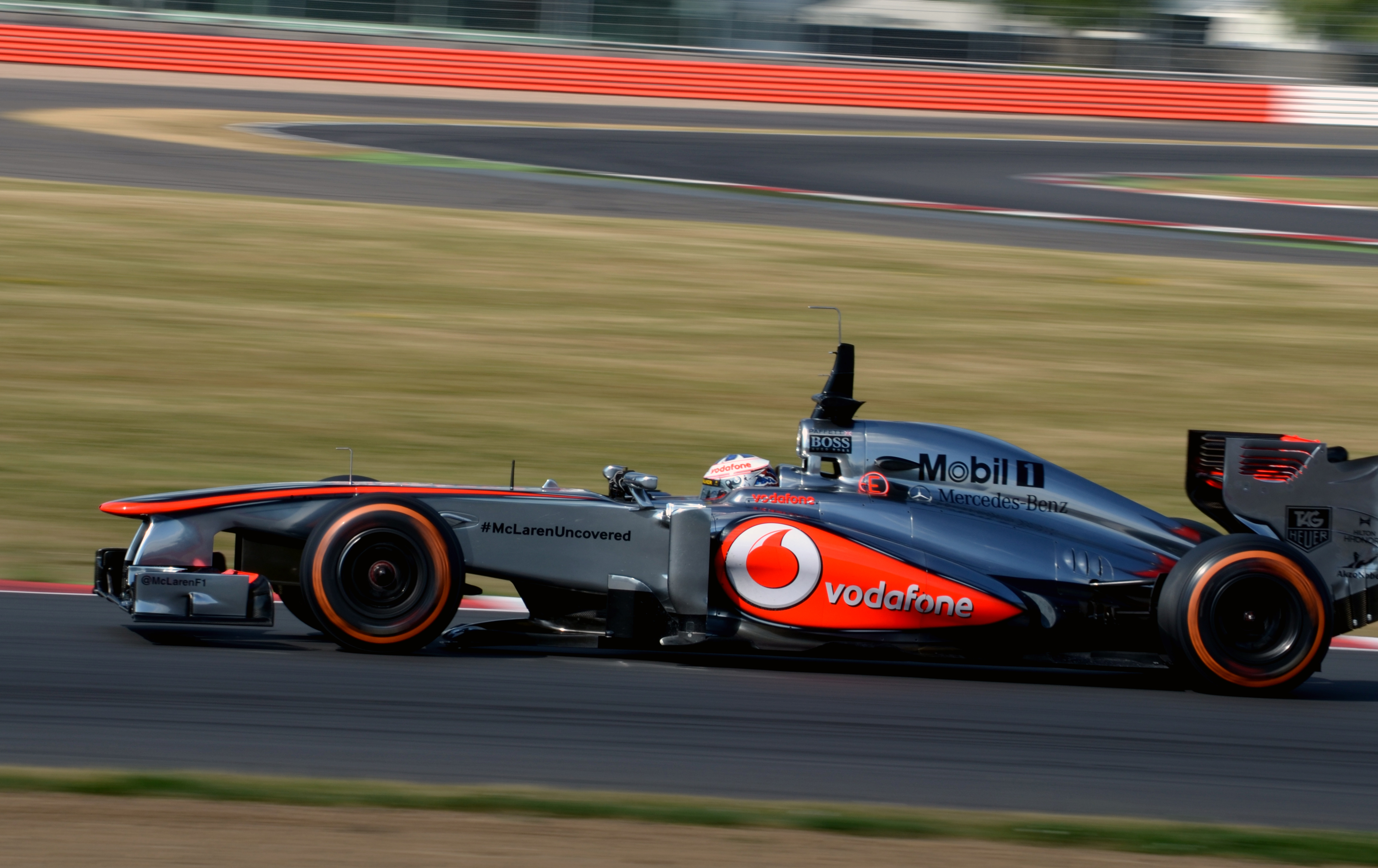
Gary Paffett testing the MP4-28 at Silverstone

After securing a sixth-place finish in Monaco, the team faced their most difficult race of the season in Canada, with Pérez and Button finishing in eleventh and twelfth place respectively, bringing about an end to their record of sixty-four consecutive points finishes; the last time McLaren had failed to score a points finish was at the 2009 Abu Dhabi Grand Prix. The team once again failed to score points in the British Grand Prix, with Button achieving a lowly thirteenth place and Pérez being classified twentieth after falling victim to an explosive tyre puncture late in the race. The team returned to the points in Germany, with Button finishing sixth and Pérez eighth. The result moved the team to within ten points of Force India in the World Constructors' Championship. Button was critical of Caterham drivers Charles Pic and Giedo van der Garde, accusing them of being too slow when moving aside as he lapped them and costing him a fifth-place finish by allowing Lewis Hamilton to catch and pass him on the last lap.

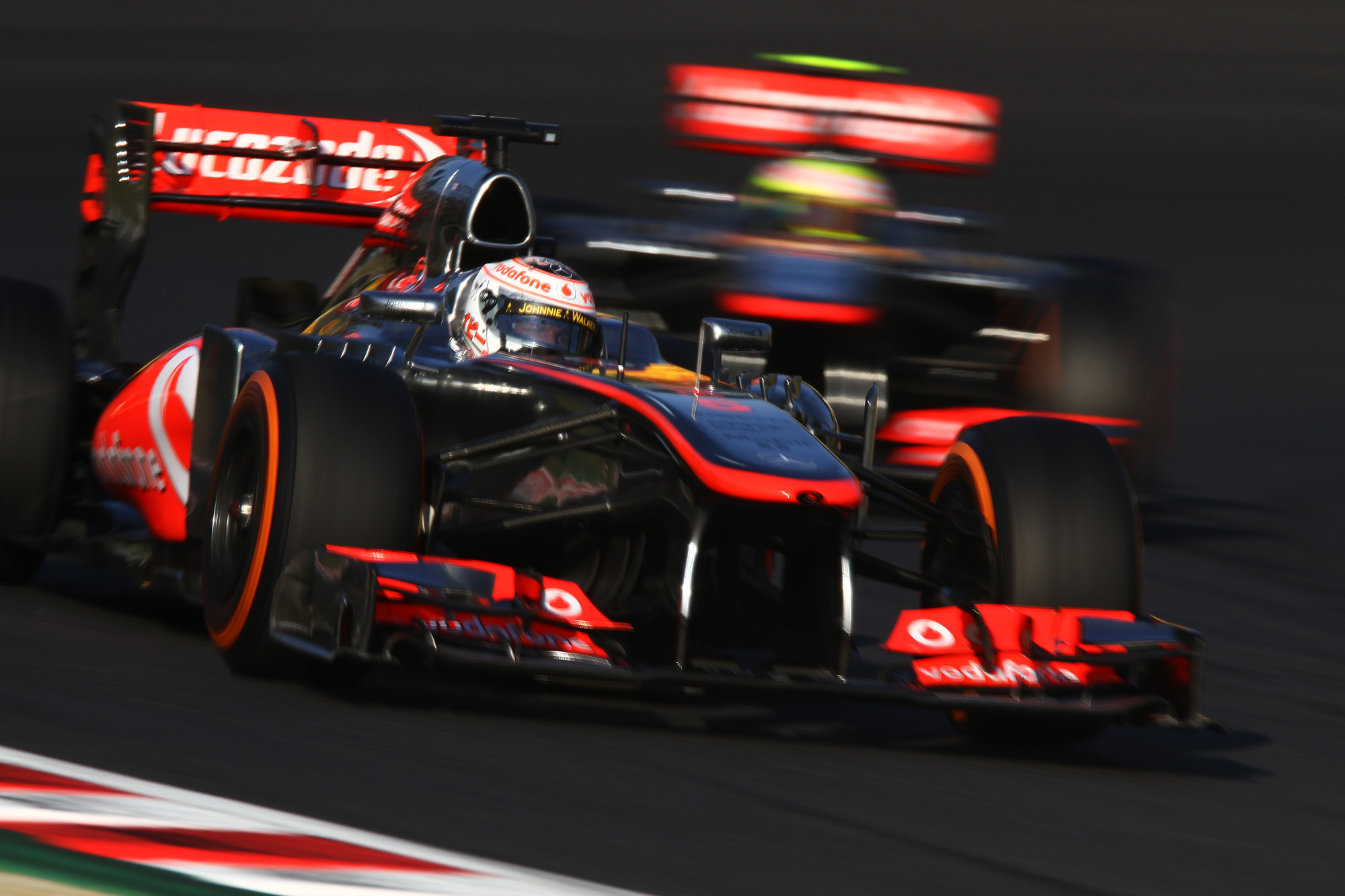
Button and Pérez at the Japanese Grand Prix

At the Indian GP, Pérez recorded a season-best 5th-place finished just four seconds shy of the podium, a result that left him "extremely satisfied". Button finished in 14th place.

After the Brazilian Grand Prix, McLaren became the first ever team to have classified both cars at every race of the season, despite Pérez having not finished two races and Button having retired in Malaysia, repeating that feat in MCL38 in 2024.

Due to the team deeming his performance inadequate, Pérez left the team and joined Force India, with Kevin Magnussen being named as his replacement.

== Sponsorship and livery ==
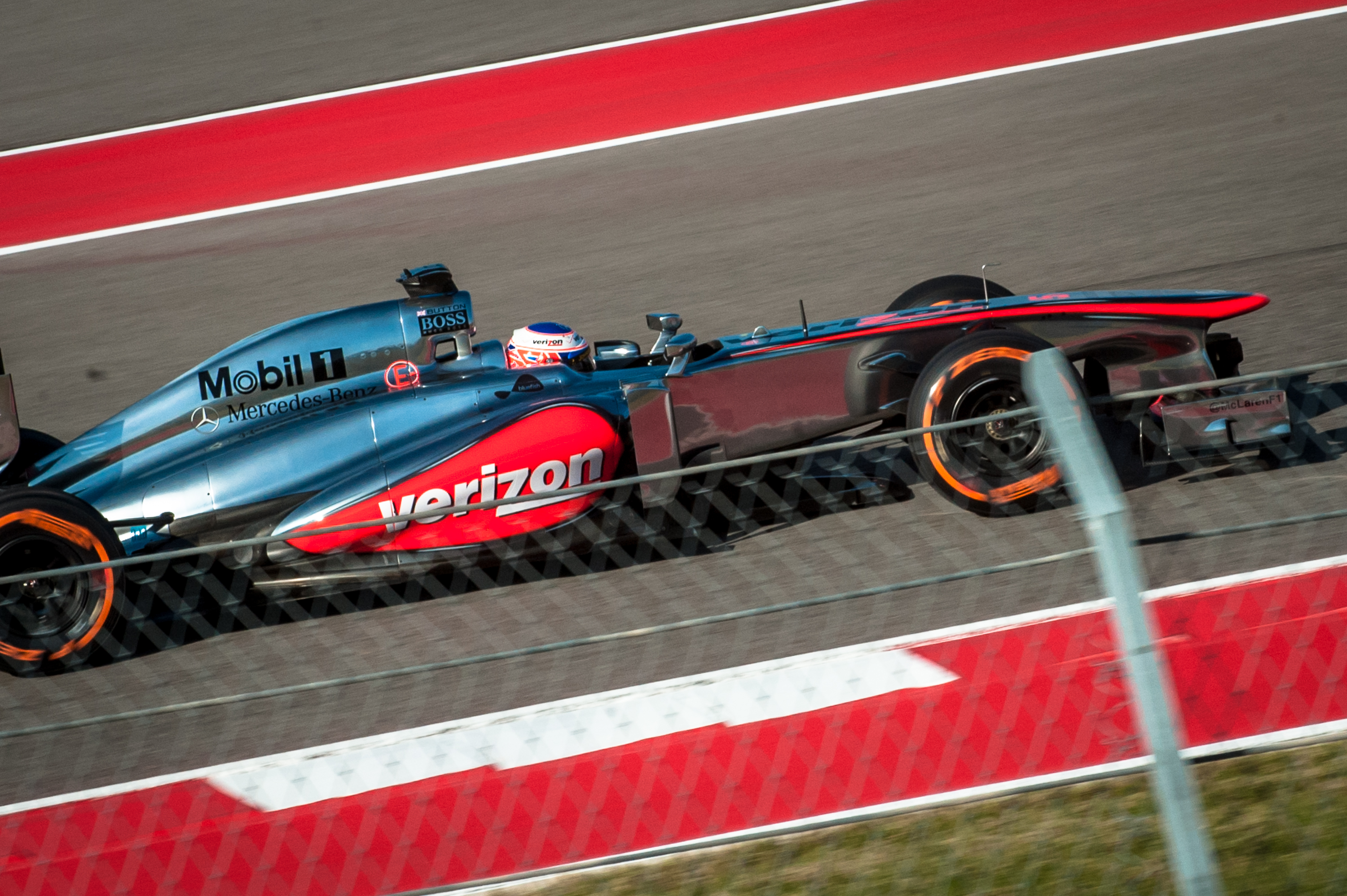
The Verizon logo visible on the sidepod of Button's MP4-28 at the United States Grand Prix

This was the last McLaren Formula One car to feature Vodafone as their main sponsor since the deal began in 2007. McLaren used Vodafone logos in all but two races. It was replaced by Zain at the Bahrain Grand Prix, and by Verizon at the United States Grand Prix. McLaren used sponsorship of Tooned, a CGI animated series based on the team, until Bahrain Grand Prix.

At the British Grand Prix, the Vodafone logo on the sides of the cars was replaced with "Ultrafast 4G" branding. At the Italian Grand Prix, the special edition logo for McLaren’s 50th anniversary year was prominently displayed on their cars. At the same race, the team ran a special livery on its cars in which traditional logos were partially replaced by branding promoting the new, high-speed 4G network of title sponsor Vodafone.

As part of McLaren’s marketing strategy, the team often leveraged local brands and short-term, country-specific sponsorship agreements during a given nation’s Grand Prix to gain regional exposure, with the sponsors' logos appearing on the sides of the car’s cockpit.

- Australia: 4G
- Malaysia: Celcom 4G LTE
- Chinese: China UnionPay
- Bahrain: Zain
- Spanish: Iltralia
- Monaco: 4G
- Canada: Bluefish
- British: Frizbee
- German: RTL - Wir helfen Kindern
- Hungary: Pick
- Belgian: Vodafone Business Partner Network
- Italian: Eataly
- Singapore: StarHub
- Korea: Olleh
- Japan: NTT Docomo
- India: Havmor Ice Cream
- United States: Bluefish

== Later uses ==
Following the conclusion of the 2018 season, 7-time NASCAR Cup Series champion Jimmie Johnson drove the MP4-28 in MCL33 livery at the Bahrain International Circuit.

In 2022, 1978 World Drivers' Champion Mario Andretti demonstrated the MP4-28 in MCL36 livery at the Laguna Seca.

== Complete Formula One results ==
(key) (results in bold indicate pole position; results in italics indicate fastest lap)

Year	Entrant	Engine	Tyres	Drivers	Grands Prix																			Points	WCC
Year	Entrant	Engine	Tyres	Drivers	AUS	MAL	CHN	BHR	ESP	MON	CAN	GBR	GER	HUN	BEL	ITA	SIN	KOR	JPN	IND	ABU	USA	BRA	Points	WCC
2013	Vodafone McLaren Mercedes	Mercedes-Benz; FO 108F	**P**	(United Kingdom) Jenson Button	9	17^{†}	5	10	8	6	12	13	6	7	6	10	7	8	9	14	12	10	4	122	5th
2013	Vodafone McLaren Mercedes	Mercedes-Benz; FO 108F	**P**	(Mexico) Sergio Pérez	11	9	11	6	9	16^{†}	11	20^{†}	8	9	11	12	8	10	15	5	9	7	6	122	5th

^{†} Driver failed to finish the race, but was classified as they had completed greater than 90% of the race distance.
