= Tooned =

Television series

- The Season 2 title card
- Starring: Alexander Armstrong; Jenson Button; Kevin Magnussen (2014); Sergio Pérez (2013); Lewis Hamilton (2012); Fernando Alonso (2016); Stoffel Vandoorne (2016); Murray Walker (2016)
- Country of origin: United Kingdom
- Original language: English
- No. of episodes: 30

Production
- Running time: 3–4 minutes

Original release
- Network: Sky Sports F1
- Release: 8 July 2012 – 22 October 2016

The Main title card used for Season 1.

Tooned is a British animated cartoon by McLaren starring Jenson Button, Fernando Alonso and comedian Alexander Armstrong, and formerly Lewis Hamilton, Kevin Magnussen and Sergio Pérez. It was aired on Sky Sports F1 before the start of each Formula One race. The first season, which starred former McLaren drivers Lewis Hamilton and Jenson Button was aired from the 2012 British Grand Prix onwards. The second season aired from the 2013 British Grand Prix onwards. All episodes can be watched on McLaren's YouTube channel and the Sky Sports F1 website any time after the premiere. The episodes are a little more than 3 minutes long. On 16 May 2014 it was announced on McLaren's YouTube channel that a season 3 was in progress. It was announced when Jenson Button was shown a picture of his 2014 teammate Kevin Magnussen's character on Tooned and also added that 'the production of Season 3 was going well'. It was announced by McLaren on 19 October 2016 that Tooned would be making a return for the 40th anniversary of James Hunt’s championship featuring Alonso, Button and Stoffel Vandoorne. The DVD releases of Tooned were done by Abbey Home Media in 2012.

== Development ==
Tooned was created by McLaren Group brand and marketing director John Allert. Visual effects house Framestore, with such members as Chris Waitt, Simon Whalley and Henry Trotter, handled production duties.

== Characters ==
=== Main characters ===
Due to the series being based on the real-life Formula One team, many of the characters play animated versions of themselves.

Season One (2012)

- Lewis Hamilton, one of McLaren's star racing drivers. He loves racing, finds engineering and testing boring, and rarely listens to Professor M. He appears in all twelve episodes of Season One (bar episodes 8 and 11), with the twelfth episode being his last before being stuck in a simulator and reformed into Sergio Pérez.
- Jenson Button, McLaren's other star driver. Like Lewis, he loves racing and is bored by testing, and is amused by Lewis' antics. He appears in episode 1–10 and 12.
- Alexander Armstrong as Professor M, McLaren's head of engineering. He has little patience for Lewis and Jenson, and is completely oblivious to the way they find his testing programmes boring. Armstrong described M as a blend of Steve Jobs and Q but not anyone specific. He appears in every episode of the series. His catchphrase is "Oh, dear. It's happened again," which he says to any chaotic situation that occurs in front of him, usually because of Jenson and Lewis’s antics.

Season Two (2013)

- Jenson Button, now McLaren's star driver following the departure of the real-life Hamilton to Mercedes (recognized in the show as a simulator glitch).
- Sergio Pérez, the new member of Tooned from 2013 who joined in place of Lewis, whereas in the show is created by a simulator glitch.
- Brian Cox as The Mechanic with No Name, a little old Scotsman who appears during McLaren's 50th Anniversary presentation to share the real story of McLaren which Professor M disapproves of. He appears in every episode of series 2 and was a mentor to McLaren's founder, Bruce.

Mobil 1 Series: The Story Of Oil (2013)

- Tony "Smoke" Stewart, NASCAR driver and co-owner of the Mobil 1-sponsored teams of Stewart–Haas Racing.

Mobil 1 Series 2 – Oil: An Odyssey (2014)

- Kevin Magnussen, McLaren's up and coming rookie, who replaced Sergio Pérez, much like in real life.

=== Other characters ===
- The Mechanics appear in almost every episode. They are always kept occupied by Professor M, but never speak. The head mechanic is Charlie McRae. They appear in episodes 1–11.
- The Tour Guide appears in the first four episodes of the first season, showing tour groups around the McLaren team headquarters. She often shows off memorabilia from some of the team's famous drivers. She appears in episodes 1-4.
- Baron von Richtmacher was Professor M's rival when M was racing. While von Richtmacher was the faster driver, M's intelligence and appreciation for engineering saw him win. He appears in episode 5.
- The Mayoress of Woking is the mayor of Woking, the town in which McLaren is based. She appears as a little old lady, and Professor M wrongfully assumes that she knows nothing of engineering. She appears in Episode 6. However, if the Tooned DVD is bought, an episode hidden in the extra features portrays exactly the same episode on with the Mayoress replaced by the Queen of the UK.
- MP4 RTD-1 (also known as the McLaren Project 4 Robot Test Driver) is a robot developed by Professor M to be the perfect test driver. RTD-1 appears in episode 7, along with MP4-RPM1 (a robot avatar of Professor M sent along because the real M expected Lewis and Jenson's antics to have something go wrong).
- Nyck de Vries, member of the McLaren driver development programme. He is young and eager to drive a Formula One car, but is often forced to sit through M's lessons, which he finds boring. Nyck appears in episodes 8 and 11.
- Mika Häkkinen, the 1998 and 1999 Formula One World Drivers' Champion. Mika insists that he is retired from racing, but it does not take much persuasion from Lewis and Jenson to convince him to start racing again. He appears in episode 10. It is revealed in Season 2 that he is an Intergalactic Super Hero from planet Sisu; at the end of the season 2 episode fellow Finnish McLaren driver Kimi Räikkönen is assumed to be the same.
- Ron Dennis, the Executive Chairman of the McLaren group. He is styled as a faceless James Bond villain, with a talking parrot, Cosworth. He appears in episode 12.

== Series overview ==
Series	Episodes	Originally released	
Series	Episodes	First released	Last released
1	12	8 July 2012	25 November 2012
2	8	30 June 2013	24 November 2013
3	6	2013	2013
4	3	2014	2014
Special		22 October 2016	

== Episodes ==
=== Season 1 (2012) ===
The first season comprises the following 12 episodes.

No. overall	No. in season	Title	Original release date
1	1	"Wheel Nuts"	8 July 2012
Lewis Hamilton and Jenson Button arrive at the McLaren Technology Centre to begin the development of the team's 2013 car. Jenson gets to test the car, but Lewis loses his patience and grabs a rocket-powered golf cart despite their teacher Professor M not wanting them to get competitive with each other.
2	2	"Slicks"	22 July 2012
Lewis and Jenson fiddle with new safety measures that Professor M created with the intention of making their cars safer. Lewis unintentionally activates the new ejector seat, while Jenson activates the fire extinguisher.
3	3	"Track to the Future"	29 July 2012
Professor M shows off secret gear and track elements developed for the 2020 season and beyond. When he shows the future car's prototype, Lewis flies the car out of the building.
4	4	"Beyond the Limit"	2 September 2012
Bored by another day of testing, Lewis and Jenson discover that their cars can travel at speed in reverse, much to Professor M's annoyance.
5	5	"Lift Story"	9 September 2012
Knowing Lewis and Jenson's disregard for engineering, Professor M secretly breaks down an elevator to show its importance through a story of his time fighting for the championship in Formula One.
6	6	"Gone with the Wind"	23 September 2012
Lewis and Jenson help Professor M with a demonstration of aerodynamics to the Mayoress of Woking. When Professor M gets distracted with talking to her, he unintentionally causes the demonstration to go awry.: Note: A special Diamond Jubilee version on this episode was made with The Queen replacing The Mayoress of Woking
7	7	"The Rising Son"	7 October 2012
In Japan, Professor M shows off his latest creation: RTD-1, an android test driver capable of learning as he develops. M wants Lewis and Jenson to work alongside RTD-1, but Lewis and Jenson teach him how to race. RTD-1 crashes into "Professor M," who is actually a copy of its creator while the real Professor M stayed back in the main technology centre.
8	8	"Lecture Circuit"	14 October 2012
While Lewis and Jenson are off doing charity work, Professor M takes McLaren's Young Driver Programme candidate Nyck De Vries for a four-hour lecture on engineering. When Nyck grows bored, he decides to sneak one of McLaren's racing cars out for a test drive.
9	9	"Strictly Bollywood"	28 October 2012
With the team scheduled to provide the post-race entertainment for the Indian Grand Prix, Professor M shows off a Bollywood-inspired dance routine for the team to learn. Only to find out that they were providing the post race entertainment for the Brazilian Grand Prix.
10	10	"Photo Finnish"	4 November 2012
While doing promotional work for McLaren's new go-karts, Lewis and Jenson convince former McLaren driver Mika Häkkinen to return to racing using them.
11	11	"Side Tracked"	18 November 2012
Nyck returns to the team for another lesson, this time applying his knowledge to the circuit. When Nyck gets bored, he once again escapes with testing the car.
12	12	"A Glitch Too Far"	25 November 2012
Lewis and Jenson go for a test in the simulator, but experience malfunctions that mess with their bodies. When Professor M calls McLaren team boss Ron Dennis to fix the situation, Jenson escapes, but Lewis gets overpowered by the glitches and is reformed into another driver. Final Appearance: Lewis Hamilton

=== Season 2 (2013) ===
The second season comprised eight episodes, bringing the total number of episodes to twenty. Based on McLaren's 50th Anniversary, Season 2 was written by Chris Waitt, Henry Trotter, Ed Dyson and Tim Bain.

No. overall	No. in season	Title	Original release date
13	1	"A Night To Remember"	30 June 2013
When Jenson and reformed teammate Sergio Pérez make their appearances at the McLaren 50th Anniversary presentation by Professor M, an elderly Scottish man claims that he knows the true story of McLaren's origins as opposed to Professor M's knowledge. Debut: Sergio Pérez; Brian Cox as The Mechanic with No Name
14	2	"The Bruce McLaren Story"	29 July 2013
The old man tells the story of how he witnessed New Zealander Bruce McLaren start up the racing team alongside him and their kiwi, Russell. After many failed car designs, Bruce changes his road course to build a successful Formula One car and held the record of being the youngest Grand Prix winner for over forty years.
15;	3	"The Emerson Fittipaldi Story"	23 August 2013
The old man showcases to the guests the car of McLaren's first world champion, Emerson Fittipaldi. Professor M shares that his nickname was "the mouse," but the old man has a much different nickname. Debut: Emerson Fittipaldi as Himself
16	4	"The James Hunt Story"	9 September 2013
Professor M laments the brash off-track activities of the first British McLaren champion James Hunt, but the old man shares how he was a national hero to England by being a secret agent. Debut: Tommy Hunt as James Hunt
17	5	"The Alain Prost Story"	6 October 2013
Professor M introduces 4 times world champion Alain Prost as a close friend of his, where they would rebound off each other on a number of occasions. However, the old man mentions a series of races during the 1984 Formula One season where Professor M made multiple mistakes in his car that cost Alain the championship. Debut: Alain Prost as Himself
18	6	"The Ayrton Senna Story"	28 October 2013
The old man proceeds to tell the story of legendary Brazilian driver Ayrton Senna, but also mentions his rivalry with Professor M that led to the latter's termination during the 1988 season. Debut: Bruno Senna as Ayrton Senna
19	7	"The Mika Häkkinen Story"	3 November 2013
Professor M introduces two-time champion Mika and reveals how he got him back into the McLaren team. The Old Man then shares how he found Mika as a super-powerful baby in Finland and harnessed his powers into a Formula One career.
20	8	"The Grand Finale"	24 November 2013
Seeing Professor M's total ignorance to what he's been showing everyone, the old man takes Bruce's first car for a spin, with all the other drivers in attendance racing him. The old man then realizes Professor M's perseverance to keep the show as was intended, and gifts him Bruce's old timekeeper as the presentation ends. Final Appearance: The Mechanic With No Name Cameo Appearance: Tony Stewart (first person who opened his eyes when the older mechanic started the engine)

=== Season 3 (2013) ===
Season 3 was created under Mobil 1 and featured Professor M alongside his three “lab assistants,” Jenson Button, Sergio Pérez, and former NASCAR driver Tony Stewart.

No. overall	No. in season	Title	Original release date
21	1	"What's Oil About"	2013
22	2	"The History of Lubrication"	2013
23	3	"Experiments"	2013
24	4	"Oil Around the World"	2013
25	5	"Inside an Engine"	2013
26	6	"Oil's Well that Ends Well"	2013

=== Season 4 (2014) ===
Season 4 was also created under Mobil 1 with the same cast minus Sergio Pérez, who was replaced by Kevin Magnussen following the 2013 Formula One season.

No. overall	No. in season	Title	Original release date
27	1	"Oil: An Odyssey - Part 1"	23 May 2014
28	2	"Oil: An Odyssey - Part 2"	5 June 2014
29	3	"Oil: An Odyssey - Part 3"	19 June 2014

=== Special (2016) ===
A special episode was made to commemorate the 40th anniversary of James Hunt, featuring the McLaren drivers at the time, Jenson Button and Fernando Alonso, and also featured reserve driver Stoffel Vandoorne.

No. overall	No. in season	Title	Original release date
30	1	"#Hunt40"	22 October 2016

== Mobil 1 series ==
A special series of Tooned was produced in partnership with Mobil 1. It stars Jenson, Checo, Professor M and a new character, Smoke (former NASCAR drivers' and owners' champion Tony Stewart). In this series, Professor M is hired in by Mobil 1 to explain the history of oil and lubricants and Jenson, Checo, and Smoke are used as demonstrators. The episodes are available on YouTube, and six episodes have been developed. A second series followed, replacing Checo with Kevin to reference the real-life driver lineup change of Kevin Magnussen replacing Sergio Pérez.

== Promotion ==
The Tooned logo was added to the back of the McLaren MP4-27 and McLaren MP4-28's rear wings from the 2012 Hungarian Grand Prix to the 2013 Bahrain Grand Prix. A DVD of series 1 was released on 10 December 2012.
