= Enkei Corporation =

Japanese wheel manufacturer

- Native name: エンケイ株式会社
- Romanized name: Enkei Kabushiki-gaisha
- Company type: Private
- Industry: Automotive
- Founded: October 5, 1950; 75 years ago
- Headquarters: Chūō-ku, Hamamatsu, Shizuoka Prefecture 430-7726, Japan
- Area served: Worldwide
- Key people: Junichi Suzuki (president)
- Products: Motorcycle and automobile wheels; Auto accessories; Aluminium ingots; Aluminium raw materials; Aluminium parts; Dies for casting and molding
- Number of employees: 8,160 (consolidated, as of March 31, 2018)
- Website: www.enkei.co.jp

Enkei Corporation (エンケイ株式会社, Enkei Kabushiki-gaisha) is a Japanese motorcycle and passenger car wheel manufacturer for both motorsport and street use.

The company was founded in 1950 and it is also an OEM manufacturer of wheels for production vehicles, mainly in Aluminium wheels for sporty models.

The name Enkei is an abbreviation of its original name at the time of foundation in 1950, Ensyu Keigoukin (lit. Enshu lightweight alloy), where Enshu is a historical name for Shizuoka prefecture of Japan.

== Motorsport ==
Enkei has been involved in motorsport, most famously in Formula One since 1995, supplying wheels to McLaren until 2021. The Enkei and McLaren partnership continued in 2026. Enkei is also involved in the Super GT series.
