= Red Bull Racing =

Formula One racing team

Coordinates: 52°00′29″N 0°41′33″W

(Austria) Red Bull Racing-Red Bull Ford
- Full name: Oracle Red Bull Racing
- Base: Milton Keynes, Buckinghamshire, England
- Team principal(s): Laurent Mekies (Team Principal and CEO)
- Technical Director: Pierre Waché
- Founder(s): Dietrich Mateschitz
- Website: redbullracing.com
- Previous name: Jaguar Racing F1 Team

2026 Formula One World Championship
- Race drivers: 3. (Netherlands) Max Verstappen; 6. (France) Isack Hadjar; 30. (New Zealand) Liam Lawson
- Test driver(s): 22. (Japan) Yuki Tsunoda
- Chassis: RB22
- Engine: Red Bull Ford DM01
- Tyres: Pirelli

Formula One World Championship career
- First entry: 2005 Australian Grand Prix
- Last entry: 2026 Las Vegas Grand Prix
- Races entered: 438 (437 starts)
- Engines: Cosworth, Ferrari, Renault, TAG Heuer, Honda, RBPT, Red Bull Ford
- Constructors' Championships: 6 (2010, 2011, 2012, 2013, 2022, 2023)
- Drivers' Championships: 8 (2010, 2011, 2012, 2013, 2021, 2022, 2023, 2024)
- Race victories: 133
- Podiums: 312
- Points: 8703
- Pole positions: 113
- Fastest laps: 104
- 2025 position: 3rd (451 pts)

Red Bull Racing Limited, currently competing as Oracle Red Bull Racing and also known simply as Red Bull or RBR, is a Formula One racing team, competing under an Austrian racing licence and based in England. It is one of two Formula One teams owned by conglomerate Red Bull GmbH, the other being Racing Bulls. The Red Bull Racing team was managed by Christian Horner from its formation in 2005 until 2025, when he departed the team and was replaced by Laurent Mekies.

Red Bull had Cosworth engines in 2005 and Ferrari engines in 2006. The team used engines supplied by Renault between 2007 and 2018 (from 2016 to 2018, the Renault engine was re-badged TAG Heuer following the breakdown in the relationship between Red Bull and Renault in 2015). During this partnership, they won four successive Drivers' and Constructors' Championship titles in 2010, 2011, 2012, and 2013, led by Red Bull driver Sebastian Vettel, and becoming the first Austrian team to win the title.

The team began using Honda engines in 2019. The works Honda partnership culminated in 2021, following Red Bull driver Max Verstappen's World Drivers' Championship victory, with Verstappen also winning the championship in 2022, 2023, and 2024; he missed out to Lando Norris in 2025. Red Bull also won two Constructors' Championship titles in 2022 and 2023, but lost out in 2021 to Mercedes and in 2024 and 2025 to McLaren. Honda left the sport officially after 2021 but continued to supply complete engines from Japan to the team partly under Red Bull Powertrains branding until the end of 2025. Following the conclusion of their partnership with Honda, Red Bull switched to Ford engines in 2026 after having signed a deal to use their engines in 2023. Red Bull have a new wind tunnel due to be operational by 2026.

== History ==
=== Origins ===
The current Red Bull team traces its origins back to the Stewart Grand Prix outfit that made its debut in 1997. Jackie Stewart sold his team to the Ford Motor Company late in 1999 who rebranded the team Jaguar Racing. It had little success over the next five years.

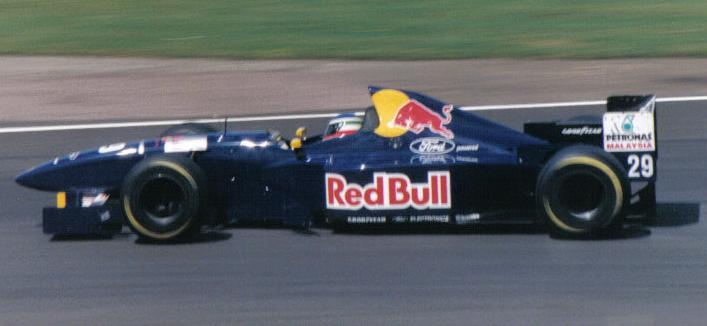
Red Bull's involvement in Formula One dates back to 1995, when it first sponsored the Sauber team.

Jaguar Racing was put up for sale in September 2004 when Ford decided it could "no longer make a compelling business case for any of its brands to compete in Formula One." Red Bull, an energy drinks company, agreed its purchase of Jaguar Racing on the final day of the sale, 15 November 2004. BBC Sport reported that Ford asked bidders for a symbolic US$1 in return for a commitment to invest US$400 million in the team over three Grand Prix seasons. The team continued to have access to the Cosworth engine developed for their 2005 chassis, and the operation continued under the new title. Christian Horner was installed as the new team boss and lined up David Coulthard and Christian Klien to drive for the team. The team operated under a British racing licence from 2005 to 2006, officially becoming an Austrian team in 2007.

Red Bull Racing was not the start of Red Bull's involvement in Formula One, as they sponsored Sauber from 1995 to 2004 and Gerhard Berger before that, beginning in 1989. After buying a Formula One team of its own, Red Bull ended its long-term partnership with the Swiss team.

=== Cosworth engines (2005) ===
==== 2005 season ====
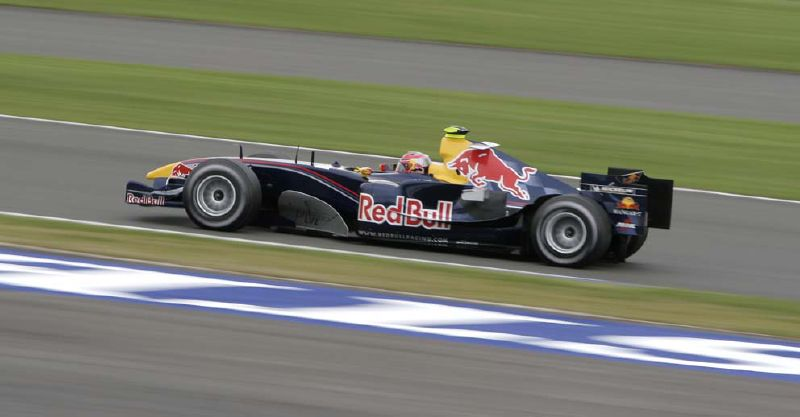
Vitantonio Liuzzi during free practice at the 2005 British Grand Prix

Red Bull's owner, Dietrich Mateschitz, reportedly tried to recruit former Formula One driver and BMW Motorsport chief (and fellow Austrian) Gerhard Berger to help guide the team through its debut season. However, this was never realised. For 2005, the chassis was christened the RB1. Red Bull Racing used Cosworth engines in its maiden year due to the ease of continuing with the engine Jaguar Racing used.

Former McLaren driver David Coulthard led the team. Coulthard was chosen for his experience, considered ideal to help lead the fledgling team. For the second car, Red Bull shared the drive between two of its young sponsored drivers: Christian Klien, who had driven for Jaguar in 2004, and 2004 F3000 champion Vitantonio Liuzzi. At first, it was announced that Klien and Liuzzi would swap driving duty every four races, but by the end of the season, Liuzzi had appeared only four times.

Red Bull's first year in Formula One was a massive success compared to its predecessors, Jaguar Racing. They were 6th in the Constructors' Championship for most of the season, only beaten by the fast-improving BAR Hondas at the end of the season. In a single season, they amassed more points than Jaguar had in 2003 and 2004. Coulthard, after a poor 2003 and 2004 with McLaren, was a revelation for the team while Klien showed that he had vastly improved from 2004. Overall they scored 34 points; 24 for Coulthard, 9 for Klien and 1 for Liuzzi. Red Bull Racing was a consistent point and occasional podium challenger for most of their debut season.

American driver Scott Speed, who rose through the ranks in the American equivalent of the Red Bull Junior Team, Red Bull Driver Search, was Red Bull Racing's third driver in 2005 for the Canadian and United States Grands Prix. Speed was attractive to Red Bull Racing because of his American nationality which would raise the profile of both Red Bull and Formula One in America, a market where the sport has traditionally struggled to make an impact.

=== Ferrari engines (2006) ===
==== 2006 season ====
On 23 April 2005, the team announced a deal to utilise customer Ferrari engines in 2006. This coincided with a rule change mandating the use of V8 engines, making it likely that both Red Bull Racing and Ferrari would use the same specification engine. Red Bull Racing continued to use Michelin tyres, rather than the Bridgestones used by Ferrari.

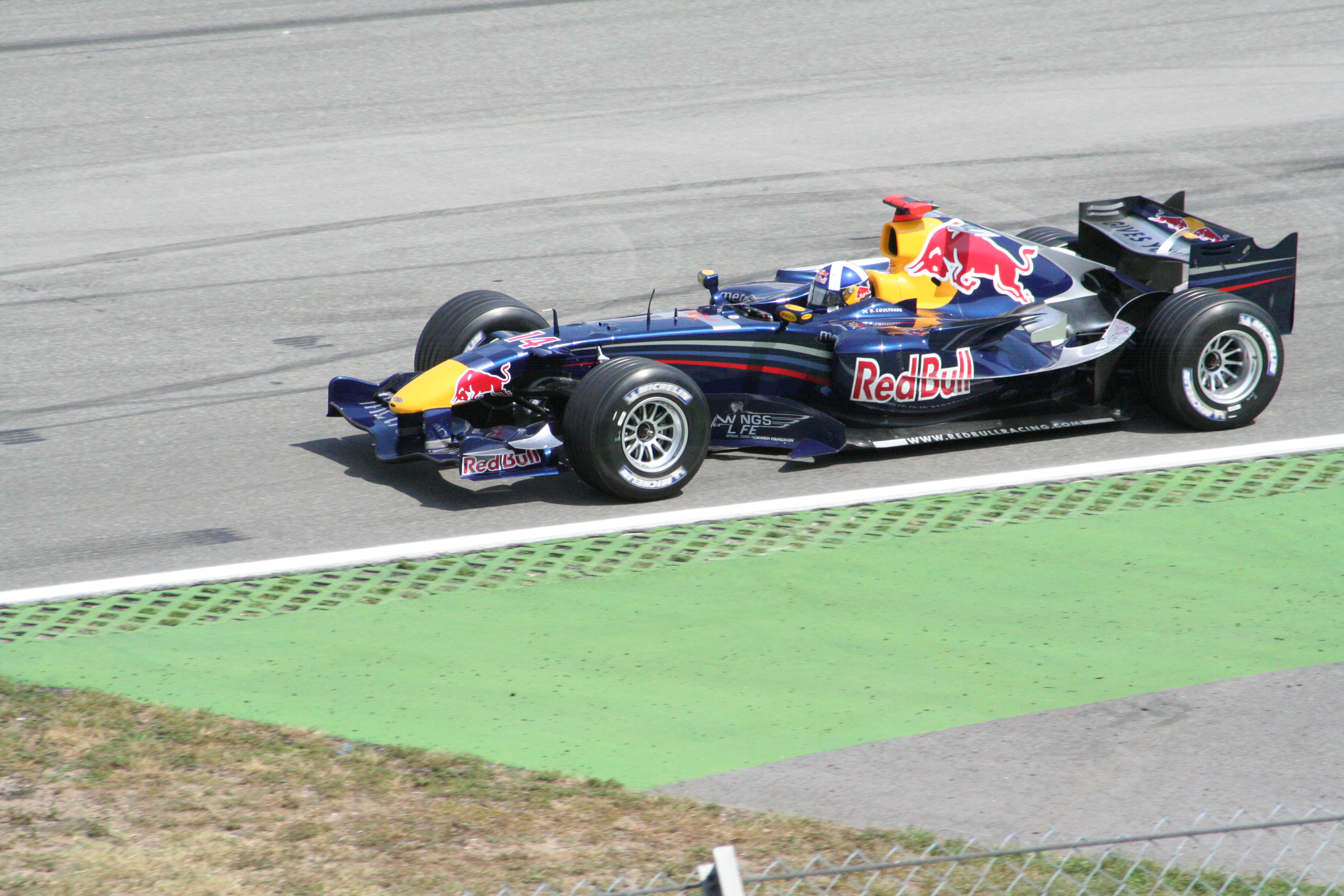
Coulthard driving the RB2 at the 2006 German Grand Prix

On 8 November 2005, Red Bull Racing hired Adrian Newey, the highly successful McLaren technical director, as well as Rob Marshall.

On 15 December 2005, the team's second car, the Red Bull RB2, hit the track for the first time. David Coulthard completed a handful of laps of the Silverstone circuit in England, and declared the new car was a "sexy looking thing". In early testing Red Bull was plagued with cooling problems and overheating of car components.

At the opening race of the 2006 season in Bahrain, Christian Klien qualified eighth (ahead of Giancarlo Fisichella's Renault and both BMWs). Coulthard had problems when he flat-spotted a tyre fighting with Nick Heidfeld, and finished 10th; the cooling problems returned when his Ferrari engine expired on the slowing down lap, forcing a grid penalty for the following race. In Malaysia, Coulthard made up several places from the back of the grid but was forced to retire with hydraulic problems, while Klien had an opening lap incident with Kimi Räikkönen and after pitting for repairs also retired with hydraulic failure. Coulthard got a point in Australia after Scott Speed was penalised for passing him under the yellow flags. The following races were marred with retirements and lowly finishes.

Coulthard finished third at Monaco, the team's first podium finish. Team boss Christian Horner said before the race that if one of his cars were to finish on the podium, he would jump into a swimming pool at the track naked. He ended up jumping into the pool wearing only a red cape. Coincidentally both Stewart Grand Prix and Jaguar Racing, the team's predecessors, also scored their maiden podiums at Monaco.

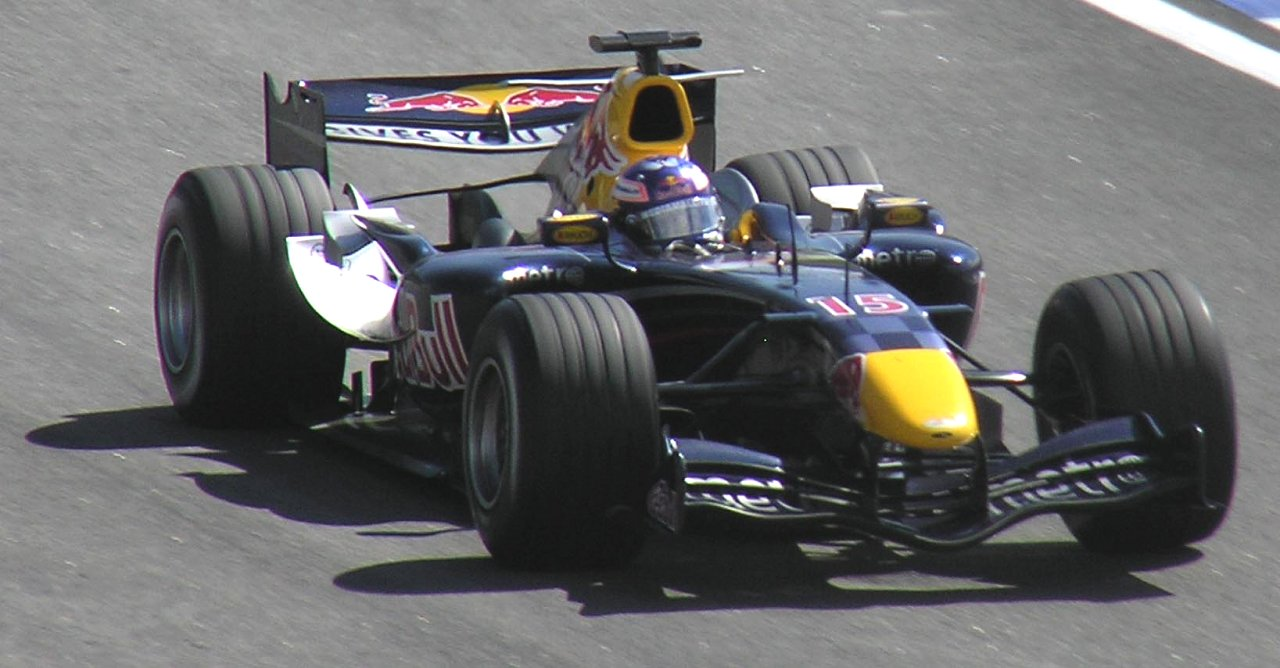
Robert Doornbos replaced Klien for the last three races of the 2006 season.

Coulthard scored a point at Montreal, passing Jenson Button in the closing stages of the race despite starting in last place due to an engine change that warranted a grid penalty. Klien also fared well, driving the second RB2 to 11th position. At the United States Grand Prix Klien retired along with eight other cars including Toro Rosso driver Scott Speed on the first lap after a series of first corner incidents. Coulthard finished 7th.

The team finished 7th in the FIA Constructors' Championship, with 16 points, five points ahead of the struggling Williams team. Coulthard (14 pts) finished in 13th place in the drivers' standings, the departed Klien (2 pts) was classified in 18th position. Klien's replacement, Robert Doornbos, failed to score any points.

=== Renault engines (2007–2018) ===
==== Customer era (2007–2010) ====
===== 2007 season =====
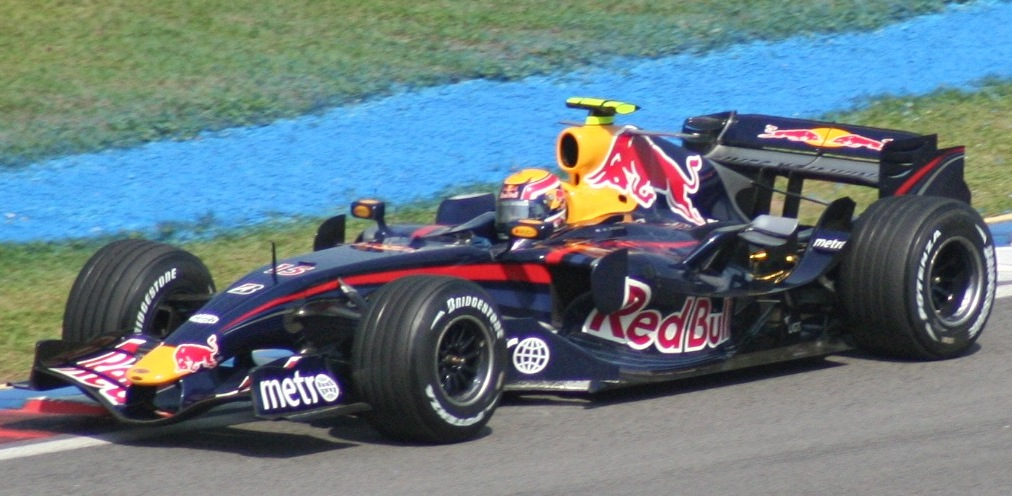
Mark Webber driving for the team at the 2007 Malaysian Grand Prix

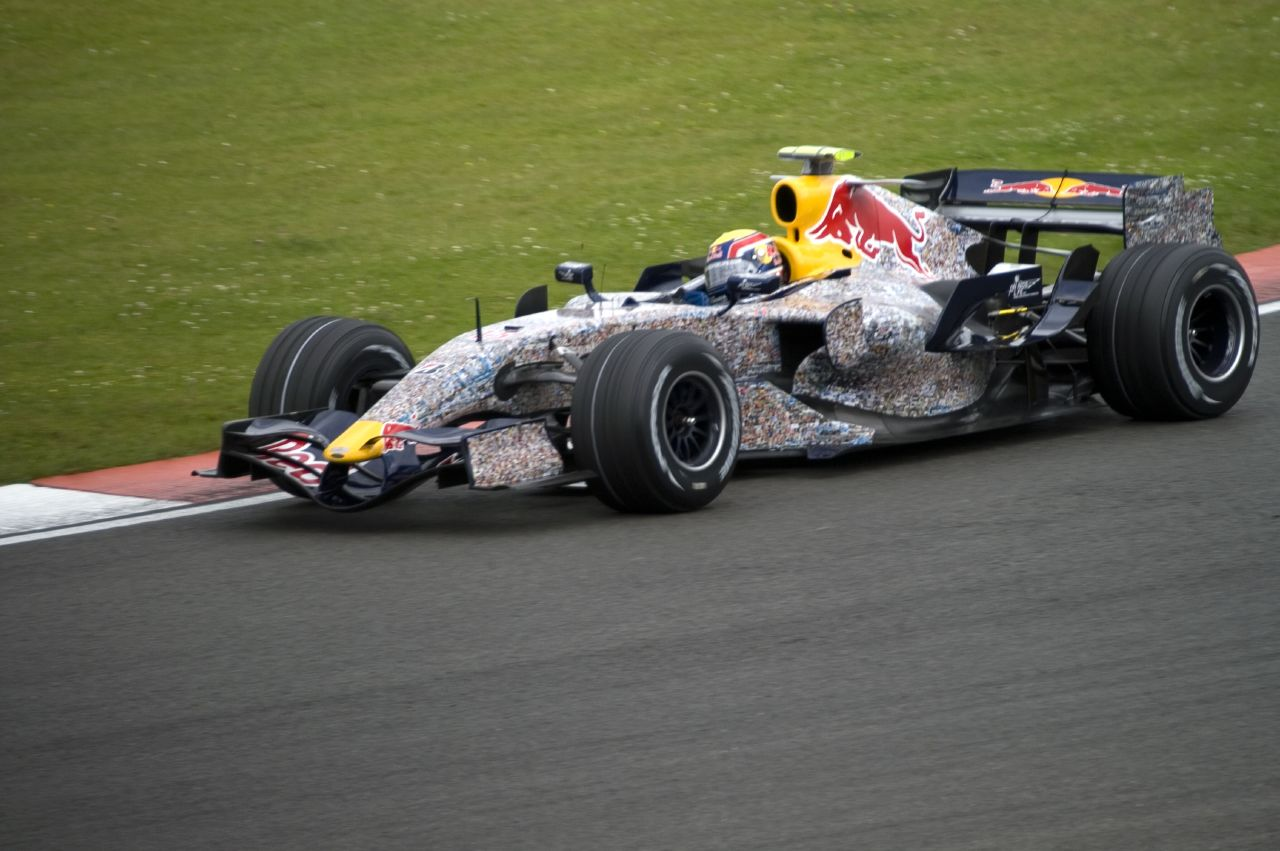
Mark Webber driving for RBR at the 2007 British Grand Prix. Note the special Wings for Life livery.

2007 saw the debut of the Adrian Newey designed RB3. After lengthy discussions over Red Bull Racing's obligation to continue to use Ferrari engines for 2007, the team announced on 31 August 2006 they would use customer Renault engines for the 2007 season, the Ferrari contract being passed to Scuderia Toro Rosso.

The team announced on 7 August 2006 that it had signed Mark Webber to drive alongside Coulthard for the 2007 season, replacing Christian Klien who ended his association with the team. Klien was replaced by Robert Doornbos for the last three races of 2006. Doornbos became the team's non-racing third driver for 2007. In 2007 Red Bull officially became an Austrian constructor by receiving an Austrian licence, though continued to operate from the same base in Britain.

Despite qualifying in 7th place for his home race in Melbourne, Mark Webber finished down in 13th due to a persistent problem with a fuel flap that closed as the pit mechanics went to put the fuel in and when it was opened it remained open until the next pit stop greatly increasing drag and decreasing airflow over the rear wing. It was worse for Coulthard however, who crashed heavily with Williams's Alexander Wurz in the late stages of the race. Malaysia was more of the same for Webber, while Coulthard retired with brake problems. However, in Bahrain the team showed improving pace, and Coulthard and Webber were running 7th (with Coulthard starting from the back) and 8th respectively before reliability problems put both out of the race in quick succession. However, in testing at Barcelona Coulthard has set the fastest lap in the new configuration of the circuit (since superseded by Felipe Massa). Coulthard secured the team's first points by scoring a gritty 5th with a faulty gearbox on his closing laps in Spain, while Webber was dogged with hydraulic problems all weekend, eventually retiring from the race after failing to set a competitive lap in qualifying. The performance hike the team experienced at the Catalan track left both drivers and team optimistic about their future results, with reliability troubles being as much a focus as the increase of their already competitive pace.

Red Bull Racing further strengthened their technical department by hiring Geoff Willis as Technical Director on 17 July 2007.

After this, the drivers achieved strong results during the unpredictable 2007 European Grand Prix, where Webber finished 3rd for his second career podium finish. Coulthard also performed well with 5th place after starting 20th on the grid due to a qualifying issue of the team keeping him in the pits too long to complete another qualifying lap.

Red Bull had a strong end to the season. Webber seemed on course for at least a podium at the Japanese Grand Prix, but he was involved in a crash with Sebastian Vettel. During the same race, Coulthard again demonstrated his wet-weather ability and finished 4th.

At the Chinese Grand Prix, Red Bull had a competitive qualifying session. Coulthard achieved 5th on the grid, along with Webber in 9th.

===== 2008 season =====
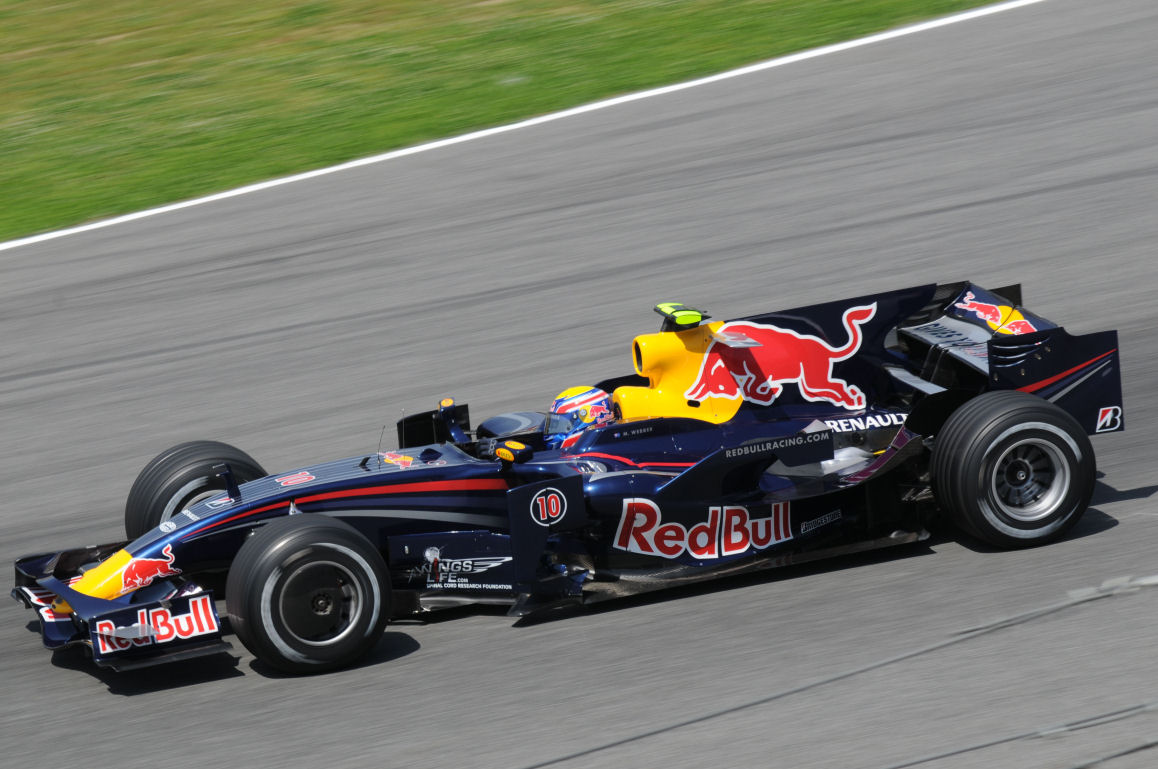
Mark Webber driving for RBR at the 2008 Spanish Grand Prix

Red Bull continued with the same drivers in 2008 and had numbers 9 and 10 on their cars after finishing 5th in the 2007 Constructors' Championship. Red Bull presented the RB4 at the Jerez circuit on 16 January and announced that Sébastien Buemi would be their test and reserve driver for 2008 combining it with his GP2 drive with the Arden International GP2 team.

After Webber retired from the opening round he went on to score 5 consecutive points finishes. Coulthard had a tougher start to the 2008 campaign due to poor qualifying, but a 3rd place at Canada gave Red Bull their first podium since the 2007 European Grand Prix. At the half-way mark, the team had notched up 24 points – the same as their total for the 2007 season – and were locked in a fierce battle with Toyota and Renault for 4th in the Constructors' Championship. The team had also resolved the reliability problems that had dogged them the previous year.

However, as the season progressed, Red Bull failed to keep up with their competitors. Red Bull scored just 5 points in the last 10 races, and Toro Rosso – the Red Bull 'B team' – had overhauled their total by the season's end and won the rain-affected Italian Grand Prix, becoming the first Red Bull-owned team to win a race. This fact led many to claim that the Renault engine powering the Red Bull was lacking in horsepower compared to the Ferrari and Mercedes engines. For the 2009 season, Renault was allowed to equalise the difference in engine power compared to their competitors after the single-year freeze in engine development from 2007.

Webber notched up his 50th top ten grid position in 107 Grands Prix at the Spanish Grand Prix. Coulthard announced his retirement from Formula One at the British Grand Prix and, despite hopes for a strong final home Grand Prix, was forced to retire on the first lap, which also occurred at his final race in Brazil where he retired at the second corner.

===== 2009 season =====
For 2009, Sebastian Vettel joined the team, taking Coulthard's seat. Red Bull Racing launched their new RB5 chassis virtually on 8 February utilising a 3D computer-generated video narrated by Vettel. The physical launch of the car was held the next day. The team secured their first pole position at the Chinese Grand Prix with Sebastian Vettel, posting the fastest time with just a single qualifying lap in Q3. Mark Webber qualified in third on the grid. The next day, Vettel won, with Webber second. Vettel's victory, in rain-soaked conditions, marked Red Bull Racing's first-ever win (although the team's predecessor, Stewart GP, had won the 1999 European Grand Prix courtesy of Johnny Herbert).

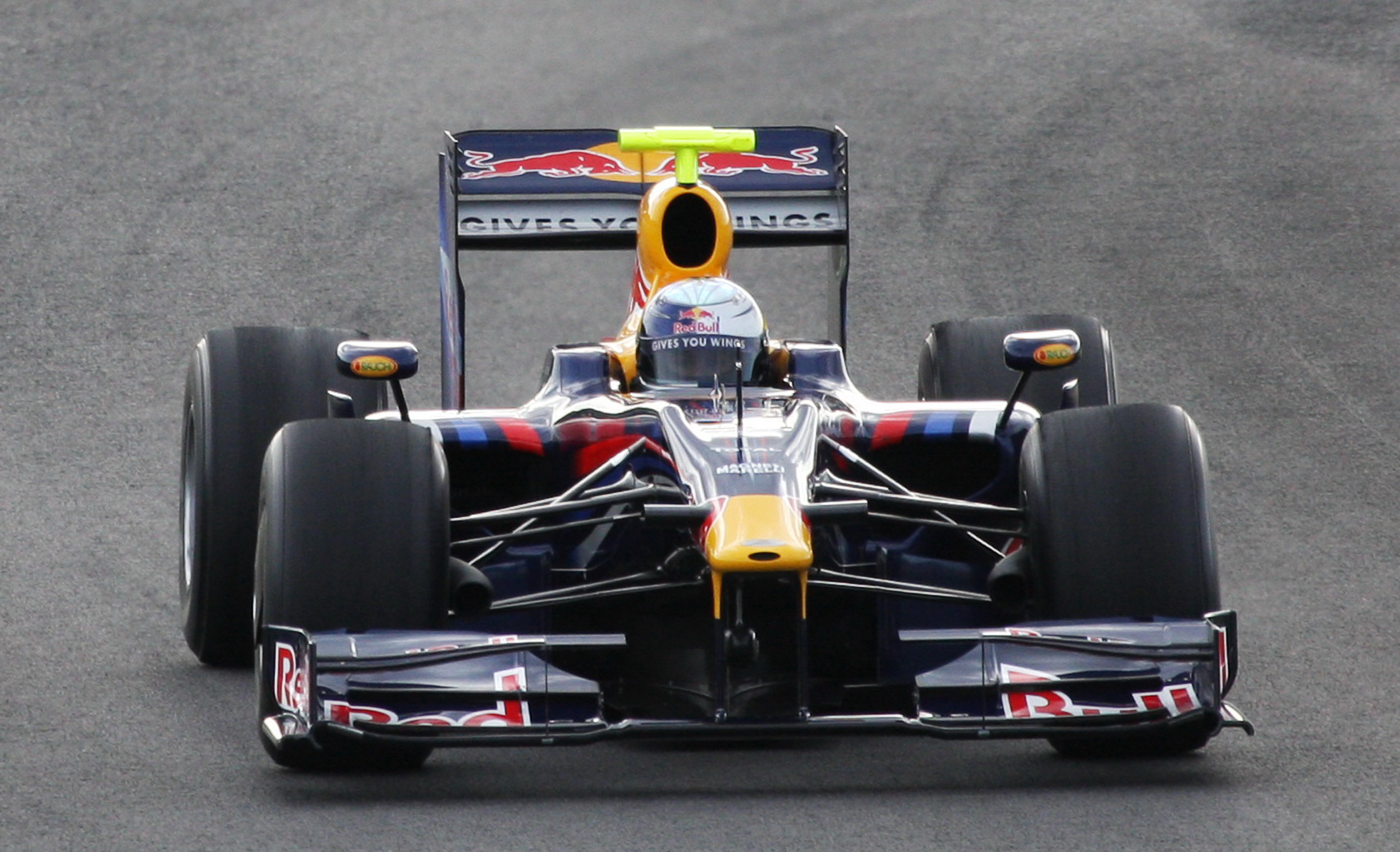
Sebastian Vettel driving the RB5 at pre-season testing at Jerez

In the next race at Bahrain after qualifying 3rd, Vettel finished second behind Jenson Button and collected another eight world championship points. At the Spanish Grand Prix, Webber and Vettel finished third and fourth respectively, after having qualified fifth and second. In Turkey, Webber and Vettel finished second and third respectively. At the British Grand Prix the car had new upgrades and Sebastian Vettel won after qualifying on pole position, ending championship leader Jenson Button's run of four straight wins. The team scored another 1–2 at the German Grand Prix with Mark Webber (who scored his first win despite being given a drive-through penalty earlier on) leading home Sebastian Vettel. Mark Webber also took his second Formula One victory at the Brazilian Grand Prix. Another 1–2 finish for the team was achieved at the season-ending Abu Dhabi Grand Prix, this time with Vettel finishing ahead of Webber.

Vettel finished second in the Drivers' Championship with 84 points, 11 behind Jenson Button. Mark Webber finished fourth with 69.5 points. The team also finished second in the Constructors' Championship with 153.5 points, 18.5 points behind Brawn GP.

===== 2010 season =====
For the 2010 season, the team retained both Mark Webber and Sebastian Vettel, with Renault remaining the engine supplier.

At the opening round, the Bahrain Grand Prix, Vettel took pole position while Webber qualified sixth. Vettel led the race until he slowed due to a spark-plug failure, while the two Ferraris and Lewis Hamilton overtook Vettel. Vettel finished fourth, and Webber finished eighth.

In Australia, Vettel again took pole, with Webber in the second position. Vettel led the race and again looked set to take the race, but he reported a vibration of one of the front wheels on his car. The problem seemed to subside, and the decision was made to keep him on the track rather than pit him. A few corners later, the problem struck again, and Vettel ran off the track and subsequently retired, due to brake failure. Webber got wheelspin off the line and gave up one position on the run to the first right-handed corner. Subsequent errors led to him dropping a few more places, and near the end of the race, he crashed with Hamilton, destroying his front wing. He pitted to get a new one, and finished ninth, scoring two points.

In Malaysia, Webber took pole with Vettel in the third position. Vettel managed to pass both Nico Rosberg and Webber before the first corner, leading for all bar two laps en route to his and the team's first victory of the year. Webber led the other two laps and eventually finished second, with the team moving up into third in the Constructors' Championship.

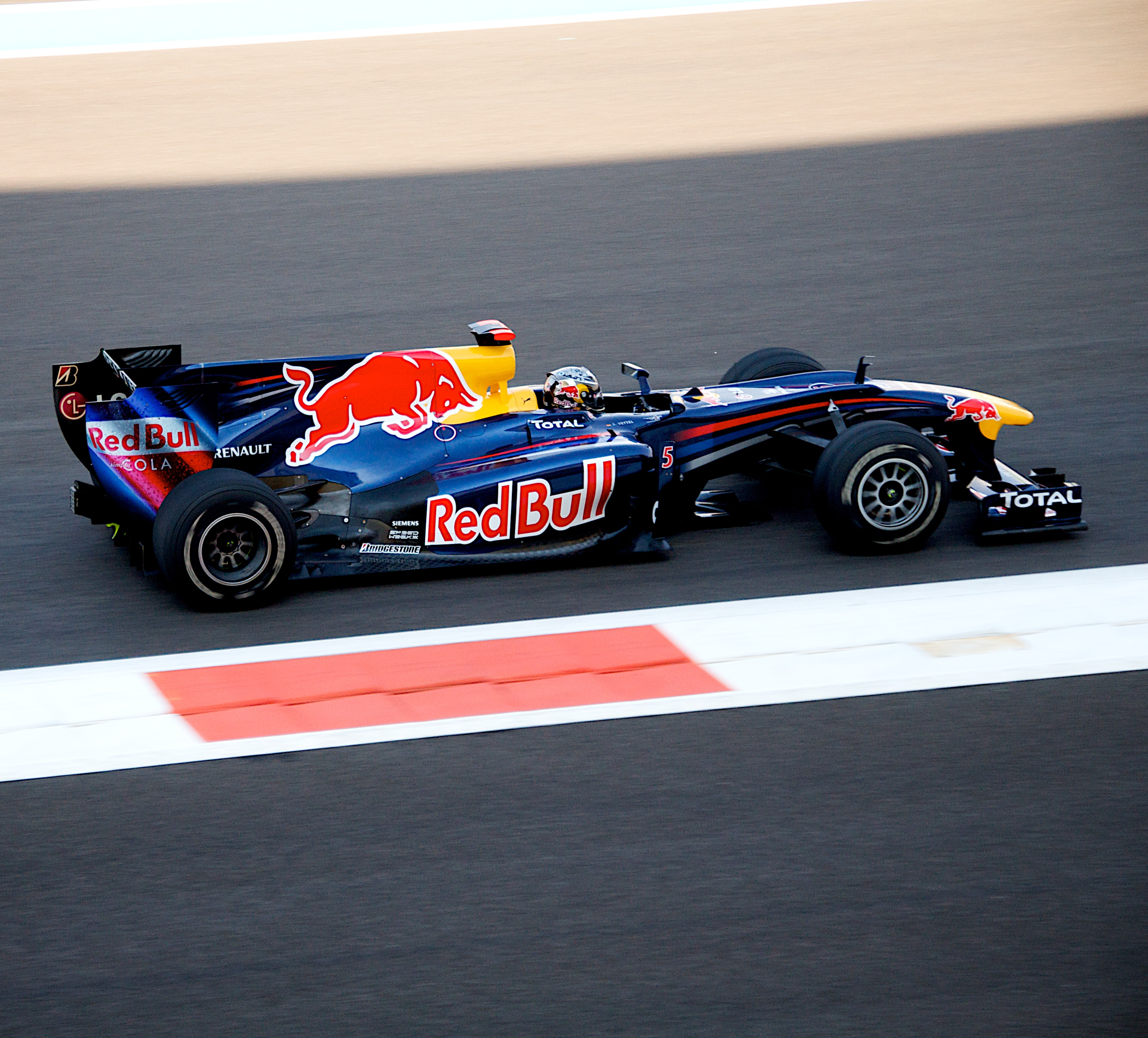
Vettel won the 2010 World Drivers' Championship at the season-ending Abu Dhabi Grand Prix.

The team once again scored pole position in China, when Vettel managed to set a faster time than Webber, who completed the front row. Webber overtook Vettel at the start, but both were overtaken by Fernando Alonso, who was later given a penalty for a false start. The race was then hit by rain and Jenson Button made the best strategy call and won the race, Vettel finished sixth whilst Webber was eighth. This left Vettel and Webber fifth and seventh in the Drivers' Championship respectively, and the team in third in the Constructors' Championship.

At the Spanish Grand Prix the two drivers were the other way around, with Webber on pole position and Vettel second on the grid. Webber won the race without too much trouble. Vettel, however, suffered brake problems and dropped to fourth – this became third when Hamilton had a puncture and crashed from second on the penultimate lap.

Webber took pole position again at the Monaco Grand Prix; Vettel qualified third behind Renault's Robert Kubica, but overtook him at the start. Webber won the race and Vettel finished in second place. This brought both drivers to 78 points, with Webber in the championship lead by countback after being in seventh after China. The team was leading the Constructors' Championship.

At the Turkish Grand Prix, Webber again took pole position, taking the team's run of pole positions to seven consecutive races, with Vettel third on the grid. Webber and Vettel were running first and second on lap 40 when Vettel attempted to overtake Webber, leading to a collision between the two. Webber finished third, while Vettel was forced to retire. Neither driver took 100% of responsibility for the incident, while senior members of the team implied that Webber had not provided "enough room" for Vettel.

In Canada, Hamilton took pole position – the first non-Red Bull pole of the year. Webber and Vettel were second and third respectively in qualifying before the pair finished fourth and fifth in the race. The team admitted that it was a track that the car struggled with.

At the European Grand Prix in Valencia, Spain, Vettel won from pole position, leading every lap of the race. Webber collided with the Lotus of Heikki Kovalainen, flipping his Red Bull car into a somersault before landing and crashing into a tyre barrier.

At the British Grand Prix at Silverstone, Vettel took pole position but after a bad start, he got a puncture and subsequently dropped to the back of the field, eventually finishing seventh. Webber, who started from second, won after leading for the entire race.

Vettel qualified in pole position in front of the two Ferraris in Germany, but finished his home race behind the pair in third place. Webber qualified in fourth but finished in sixth behind both the McLaren cars. During the race Felipe Massa controversially let Fernando Alonso past into the lead to win the race after a message from the team. Red Bull team principal Christian Horner said: "That was the most blatant team order ever". He also criticised Ferrari for not letting their drivers race each other.

At the Hungarian Grand Prix in Budapest, Vettel again took pole position and was leading until the safety car came out. He was second behind Webber, who started second and was then given a drive-through penalty for exceeding the ten-car maximum distance between himself and the safety car. This cost him second place and he finished third. Webber won the race after using his super-soft tyres for over half the race to build up a lead to keep him ahead after his stop. Webber won with Fernando Alonso ten seconds behind in second place.

The Belgian Grand Prix saw Webber claim pole position, despite McLaren and Ferrari having a straight-line speed advantage. At the start, the anti-stall device on Webber's car came on, dropping the Australian to 5th. Vettel, meanwhile in 3rd (after starting 4th) was chasing Jenson Button for 2nd place when he collided with the Brit at the Bus Stop. After sensing an inside passing opportunity, Vettel attempted to quickly change direction while under braking, causing the car to spear into the side of Button's McLaren. Button retired from the race, while Vettel was able to pit for repairs. He subsequently received a drive-through penalty for his action and suffered a rear tyre puncture while attempting to overtake Vitantonio Liuzzi, finishing 15th. Webber was able to capitalise on the DNF of Button and Alonso, as well as a mistake by Renault's Robert Kubica, during his pit stop, and finish 2nd, behind race winner Hamilton.

At the Italian Grand Prix in Monza, Webber had a bad start and was 9th from 4th place on the grid after the first lap. Vettel had brake binding problems for a short period, around lap 20, and he too dropped back a place but was then back on the pace. Webber was held back by Nico Hülkenberg in the latter part of the race, until he passed, and finished 6th. Vettel stayed out on soft tyres until the penultimate lap, doing better lap times than Webber and overtaking Mark when he pitted, to finish fourth.

At the Korean Grand Prix in Yeongam, Vettel gave the team its 19th pole position, while Webber started second, making it a Red Bull front row. On lap 18, Webber spun and hit the wall, and hit the Mercedes of Nico Rosberg, causing both drivers to retire. Worse was to come for the team when Vettel's engine failed just 10 laps from the finish, while he was in the lead, and the German retired and handed his lead to Fernando Alonso in the Ferrari. Red Bull had suffered their first double retirement since the 2008 Australian Grand Prix and as a result, Webber lost his championship lead and Vettel's engine failure prevented him from leading the championship for the first time in 2010, but the team still led the Constructors' Championship.

At the Brazilian Grand Prix in São Paulo, Red Bull Racing became Constructors' Champion for the first time after Sebastian Vettel and Mark Webber finished 1–2 in the race. In doing so Red Bull became the first Austrian team to win the Formula One Constructors' Championship. Christian Horner stated that the main goal had been achieved and that now his remaining aim was to win the Drivers' Championship and put the icing on the cake of Red Bull's year. In some other teams, the drivers would have been told to change positions, to improve better placed Mark Webber's chances to win the drivers' title in the last race, but the team insisted that the faster driver should win the race, and kept being reluctant to give any orders of the kind "let your teammate pass" to their drivers.

In the final race at Abu Dhabi, Sebastian Vettel won the race and the Formula One Drivers' Championship. Red Bull finished the year with a total of 9 Grand Prix victories with five going to Sebastian Vettel and four going to Mark Webber. Red Bull claimed a total of 15 pole positions with 10 going to Vettel and five going to Webber. The team scored six fastest laps three scored by Vettel and three scored by Webber. Horner also praised the sportsmanship of both drivers, stating that they conducted themselves in a well-ordered and mannered fashion.

==== Renault full-works partnership era (2011–2015) ====
===== 2011 season =====
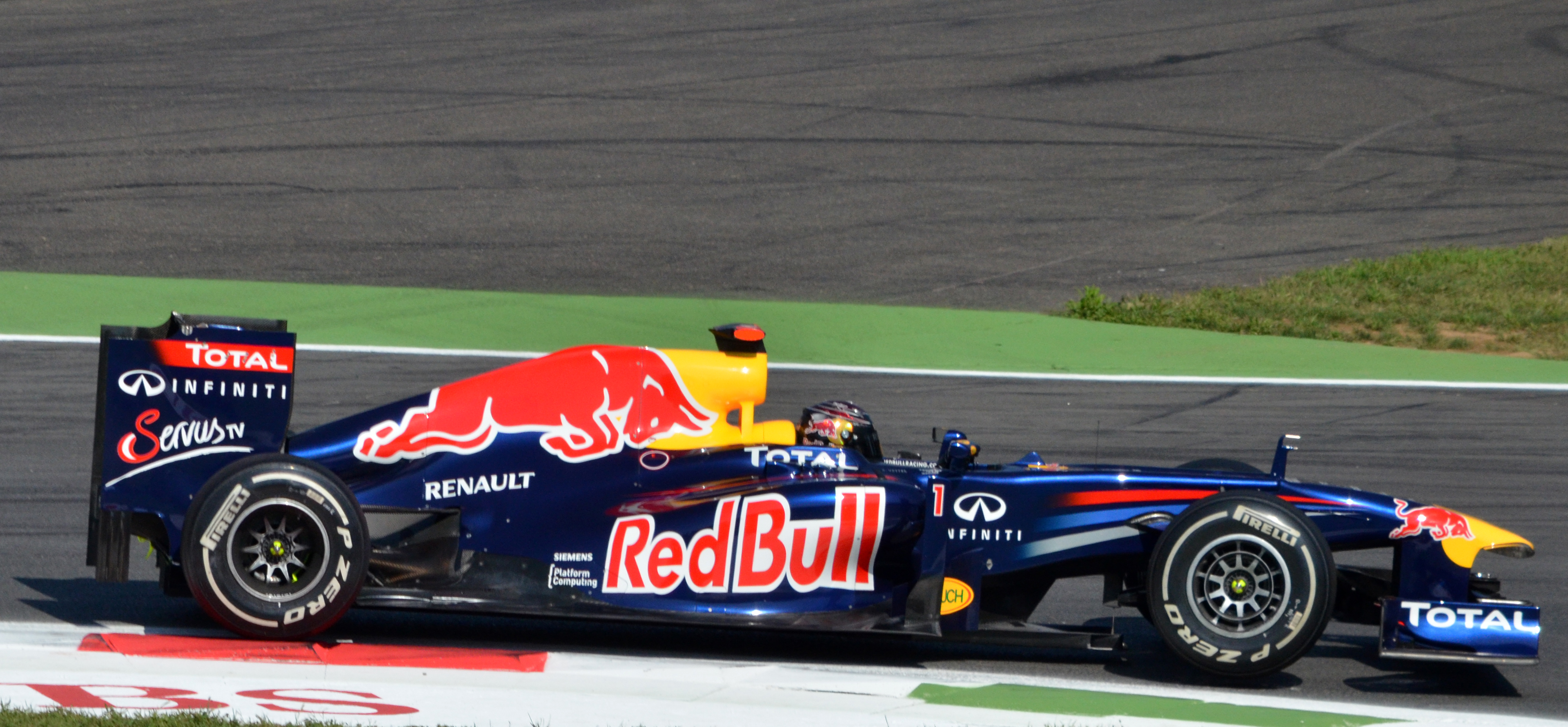
Sebastian Vettel competing at the 2011 Italian Grand Prix

Red Bull Racing was officially promoted to Renault's full-works partnership status, received free engines as Renault's full-works constructor team was rebranded to Lotus Renault GP and thus Renault shifted its factory support to Red Bull Racing. Both Sebastian Vettel and Mark Webber were retained by the team for the 2011 season, as was engine supplier Renault. Vettel defended his world title – becoming the ninth driver to do so – after winning eleven of the season's races, and also achieved 15 pole positions during the season, breaking Nigel Mansell's record from the 1992 season. Webber finished the season in third place in the championship, taking one victory, in the final race of the season in Brazil. The team also defended their respective title, as they finished the season with 650 points in the Constructors' Championship, 153 points ahead of the next closest team, McLaren. Nissan's premium automotive brand Infiniti joined Red Bull Racing as an official partner for the 2011 and 2012 seasons which saw Infiniti logos appear on the race car, drivers overalls and team kit.

===== 2012 season =====
For the 2012 season, Red Bull retained the duo of Sebastian Vettel and Mark Webber from the previous three years. Webber was signed on a one-year contract extension while Vettel continued under his current multi-year agreement, ending at the end of 2014. Vettel won the Drivers' Championship for a third consecutive time in 2012 making him the youngest triple World Champion, surpassing Ayrton Senna.

===== 2013 season =====
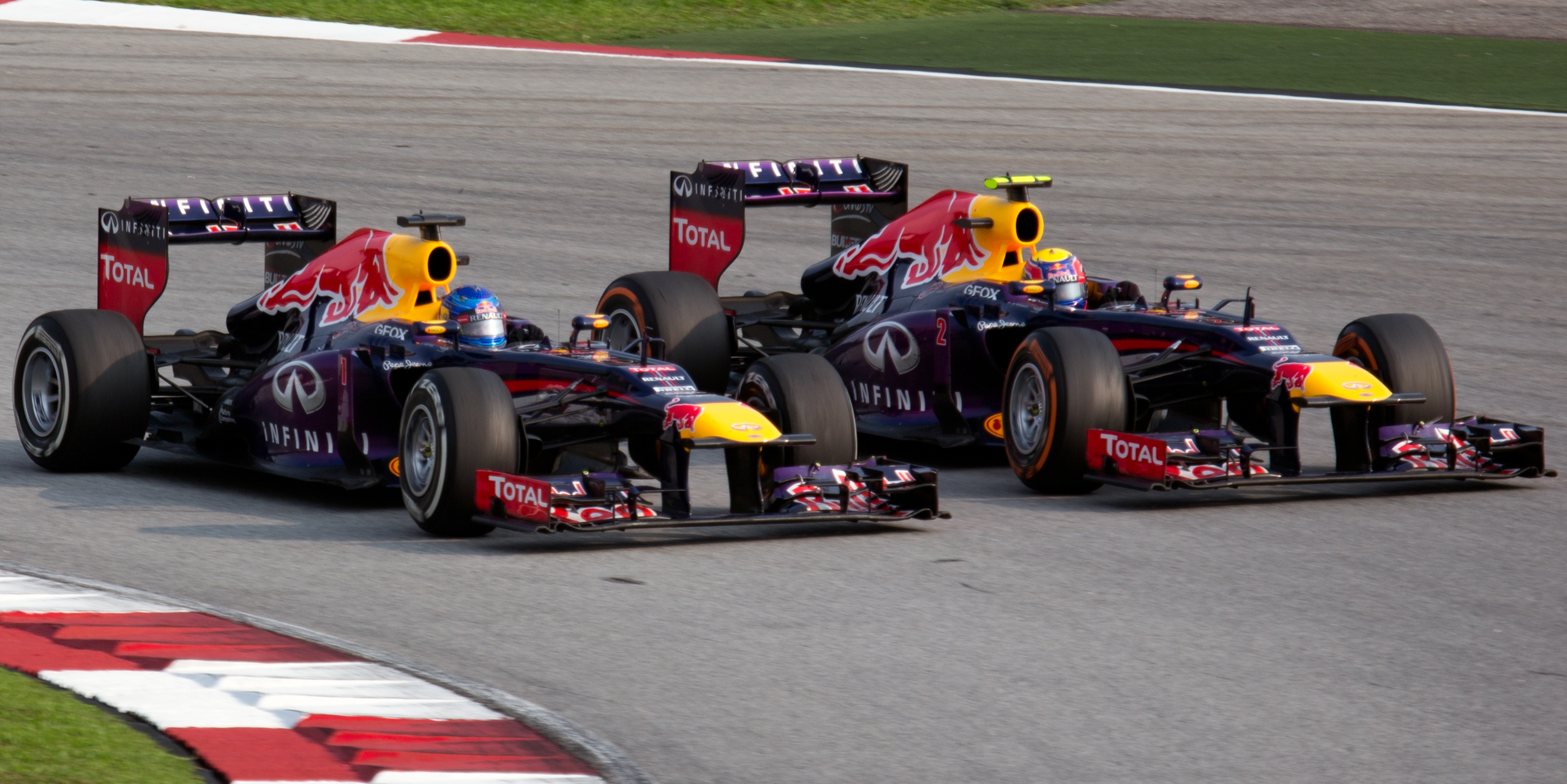
Sebastian Vettel disobeyed team orders and made a controversial overtake on teammate Mark Webber at the 2013 Malaysian Grand Prix.

The team was renamed Infiniti Red Bull Racing for the 2013 season following the announcement that premium automotive brand Infiniti had become Title Partner and Vehicle Performance Partner of the team. Infiniti Red Bull continued with drivers Sebastian Vettel and Mark Webber for the fifth consecutive season. As with 2012, Webber was signed on a single year contract while Vettel continued to honour his current multi-year agreement.

In Australia, the first race of the season, Vettel placed the new RB9 on pole position but struggled in the race, finishing in 3rd place behind 2012 title rivals Kimi Räikkönen and Fernando Alonso, whilst teammate Webber finished in sixth place. In Malaysia the team went better with Vettel again putting the RB9 on pole, then converted that into a victory, albeit under heavy controversy. Vettel won the race after disobeying a direct team order. Red Bull ordered both its drivers to maintain position with the now infamous 'Multi 21' instruction, which was a code for the driver in car #2 (Webber) must remain ahead of the other driver in car #1 (Vettel). Vettel ignored the order and passed Webber with 13 laps remaining. In the cool down room Webber could be heard asking his teammate "Multi-21, Seb. Multi-21!" and so despite the 1–2 result, the race was overshadowed by Vettel's actions. In China, the third race of the season, Vettel qualified in 9th whilst Webber qualified 14th after an issue with his fuel pick up led him to have to stop the car on the track. Infiniti Red Bull failed to give the FIA a 1-litre fuel sample, resulting in a penalty that placed Webber at the back of the grid. The downfall of his performance was matched when a collision and then a dislodged wheel nut led to Webber not completing the race. Vettel finished in 4th, retaining his lead in the World Championship. In Bahrain, the fourth race of the season, Vettel qualified in second place behind Nico Rosberg. Webber qualified fifth but started the race in seventh after a 3-place grid penalty. In the race, Webber failed to improve on his qualifying position, finishing 7th whilst his teammate won the race in a dominating fashion. After the fourth race of the season, Infiniti Red Bull finished the first round of flyaway races leading both the Drivers' and Constructors' Championships. Sebastian Vettel extended his contract with Infiniti Red Bull Racing until the end of 2015, despite interests in racing for Ferrari and Mercedes. At the British Grand Prix, Mark Webber announced his retirement from Formula One at the end of the season, having signed a deal with Porsche in the FIA World Endurance Championship for 2014. It was then announced before the Italian Grand Prix that Daniel Ricciardo, the Toro Rosso driver, would replace Webber for the 2014 season, ending talk of Lotus's Kimi Räikkönen taking Webber's seat.

At the Italian Grand Prix, Vettel secured the team's 50th pole position, and 40th Grand Prix victory. At the Indian Grand Prix, Vettel sealed the Drivers' Championship title, and in doing so, won the Constructors' Championship for Infiniti Red Bull Racing for the fourth consecutive year.

===== 2014 season =====
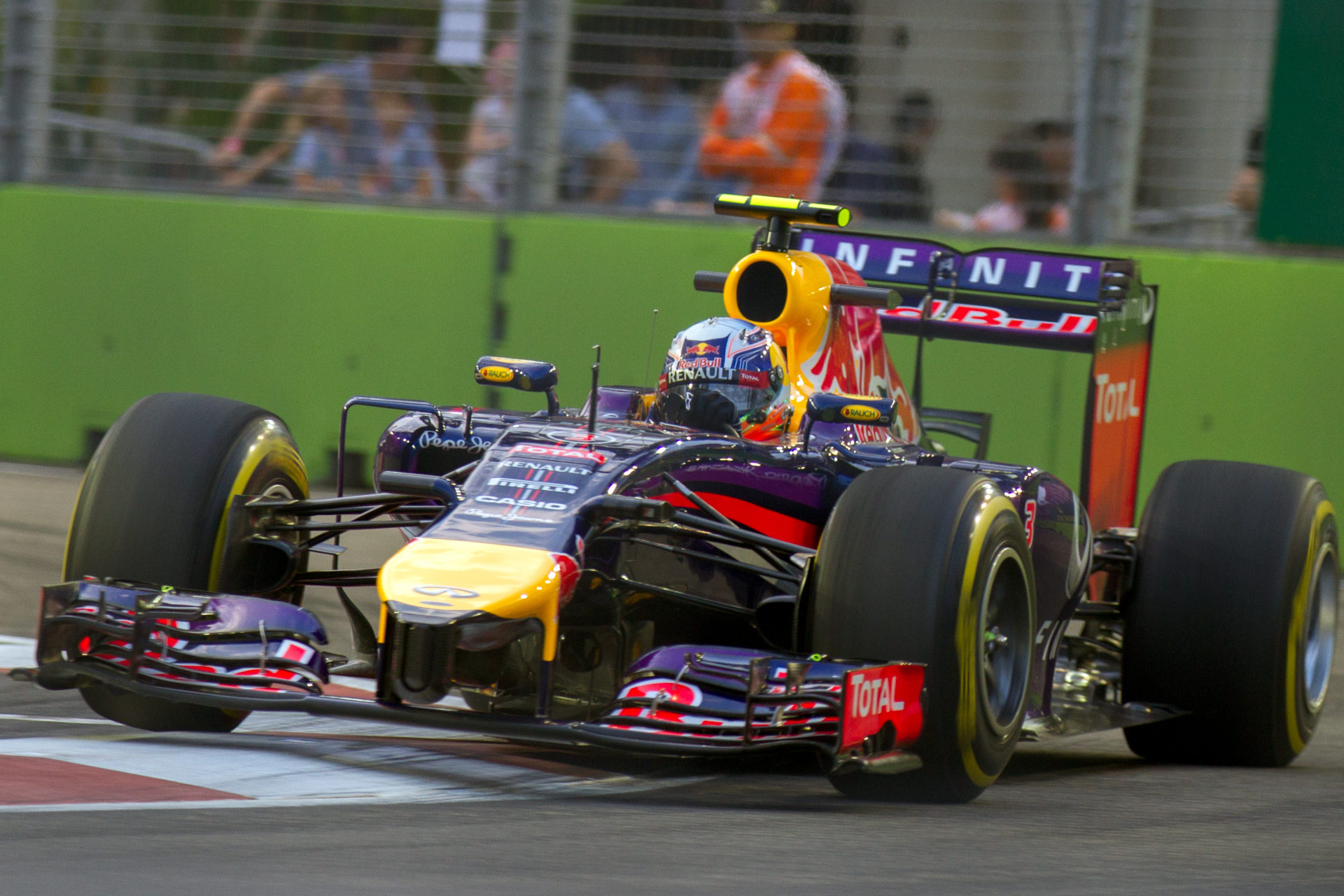
Daniel Ricciardo won three races in 2014 with the Red Bull RB10.

Infiniti Red Bull started the season with reigning World Champion Sebastian Vettel and Daniel Ricciardo who replaced Mark Webber after he had announced in 2013 that he would be moving to Porsche in the World Endurance Championship for 2014.

In pre-season testing, it became clear that the Renault engine was very unreliable and down on power compared to the Ferrari and Mercedes engines. Renault struggled to get the new hybrid engine to function properly all through testing with the combustion engine, the kinetic recovery system, and the turbo all unable to work as one.

At the Australian Grand Prix, Ricciardo had qualified second for his first race with the team while Vettel qualified a rather distant 13th, 1.8 seconds off pole-sitter Lewis Hamilton. In the race itself, Ricciardo finished second while Vettel retired after just three laps due to a power unit failure. However, after the race, Ricciardo was disqualified for violating the FIA's new rule of capping fuel use at 100 kg per hour in each race. He thus lost his podium finish. Red Bull appealed this decision on 14 April but lost their case.

At the Malaysian Grand Prix Vettel qualified second while Ricciardo qualified fifth. On lap 49 Ricciardo retired due to a technical failure while Vettel went on to finish third and earn his first podium finish of the season. Ricciardo was hit with a ten-place grid penalty for the Bahrain Grand Prix, due to an unsafe release by Red Bull at one of his pit stops. At the Bahrain Grand Prix Ricciardo qualified third, but dropped to 13th due to his ten-place grid penalty from the previous week. Vettel qualified 11th. Ricciardo managed to finish fourth, obtaining his first championship points of the season. Vettel finished sixth. At the Chinese Grand Prix, under harsh weather conditions, Ricciardo qualified 2nd, with Vettel qualifying third. Ricciardo finished in 4th again, nearly 25 seconds ahead of his teammate Vettel, who finished 5th.

Ricciardo would go on to obtain the first podium finish in his career as a Formula One driver at the Spanish Grand Prix, after qualifying third, over a second behind polesitter Lewis Hamilton. Vettel did not participate in Q3 due to problems with his gearbox, which ultimately needed to be replaced, incurring a five-place grid penalty. Despite starting from the 15th position, Vettel managed to finish the race in 4th, setting the fastest lap of the race in the process. In Canada, Ricciardo won the race, achieving his first career victory in Formula One.

After an Austrian Grand Prix with poor results, including Vettel's retirement, Christian Horner described the performance of the Renault engine as "unacceptable." He also mocked Renault in an interview with Servus TV by saying that "the big difference between Mercedes and Renault is that when a driver with a Mercedes engine pushes the overtake button his car goes faster. When our drivers, which have a Renault engine, push the button, the car stops!"

The team finished second in the championship on 405 points, with the team only winning three races throughout the season.

===== 2015 season =====
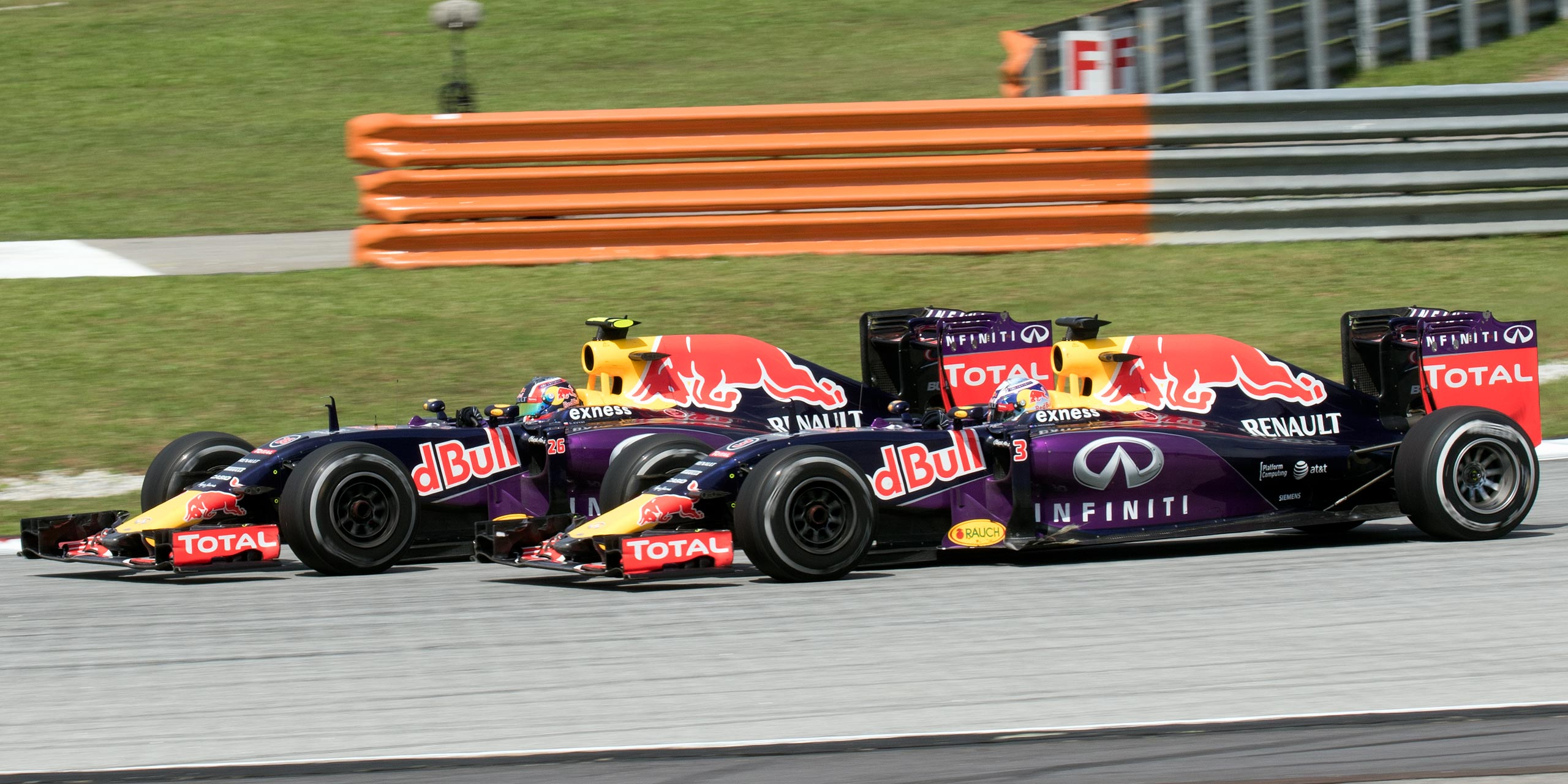
Daniil Kvyat and Daniel Ricciardo at the 2015 Malaysian Grand Prix

Daniel Ricciardo returned for a second season with the team. At the previous year's Japanese Grand Prix, the team announced that Vettel would leave after the 2014 season. He was replaced by Daniil Kvyat for 2015, who had spent a single season with the junior Toro Rosso team.

2015 for Infiniti Red Bull was seen initially as a continuous resurgence for the team. It was expected from the progress Renault made with the engine in 2014 that in 2015 it would be close to the Mercedes duo of Hamilton and Rosberg. However, it quickly became apparent that reliability, power, and drivability were all major issues that plagued the team through the season.

At the Australian Grand Prix Ricciardo qualified 7th while Kvyat qualified 13th. Kvyat failed to start the race due to a gearbox failure, whilst Ricciardo finished the race in sixth, a lap down from the race winner, Lewis Hamilton. The team scored their best finish in Hungary, where Ricciardo and Kvyat finished 2–3. Their only opportunity to win a race occurred at the United States Grand Prix, however, both of the team's drivers made some mistakes allowing both of the Mercedes cars to pass them. Lewis Hamilton won the race and, as a result, his third Formula One World Championship.

Come the end of the season, Red Bull failed to win a single race for the first time since 2008, and the team wanted to end its partnership with Renault due to the lack of progress and confidence expressed by Renault. But Red Bull was unable to find an alternative engine supplier, and continued to run Renault engines for the 2016 season, now rebadged as TAG Heuer.

They ended the season in fourth place on 187 points with Kvyat in seventh (95 points) and Ricciardo in eighth (92 points), their lowest finish position in seven years.

==== TAG Heuer era (2016–2018) ====
===== 2016 season =====
For 2016, Red Bull Racing used Renault engines branded as TAG Heuer due to their public breakdown with Renault in 2015. Infiniti also departed as a main sponsor to the newly reformed Renault Sport Formula One Team for the same reason. The team announced on 17 March 2016, one day before the Australian Grand Prix weekend, that they had formed a new technology partnership with Aston Martin, for the new season.

At the Chinese Grand Prix, Red Bull recorded their first podium of the season with Daniil Kvyat finishing third behind Sebastian Vettel and Nico Rosberg.

Daniil Kvyat and Max Verstappen traded places ahead of the Spanish Grand Prix, with Verstappen promoted to Red Bull Racing and Kvyat returning to Scuderia Toro Rosso. Verstappen eventually won the Spanish Grand Prix, becoming the youngest ever Grand Prix winner.

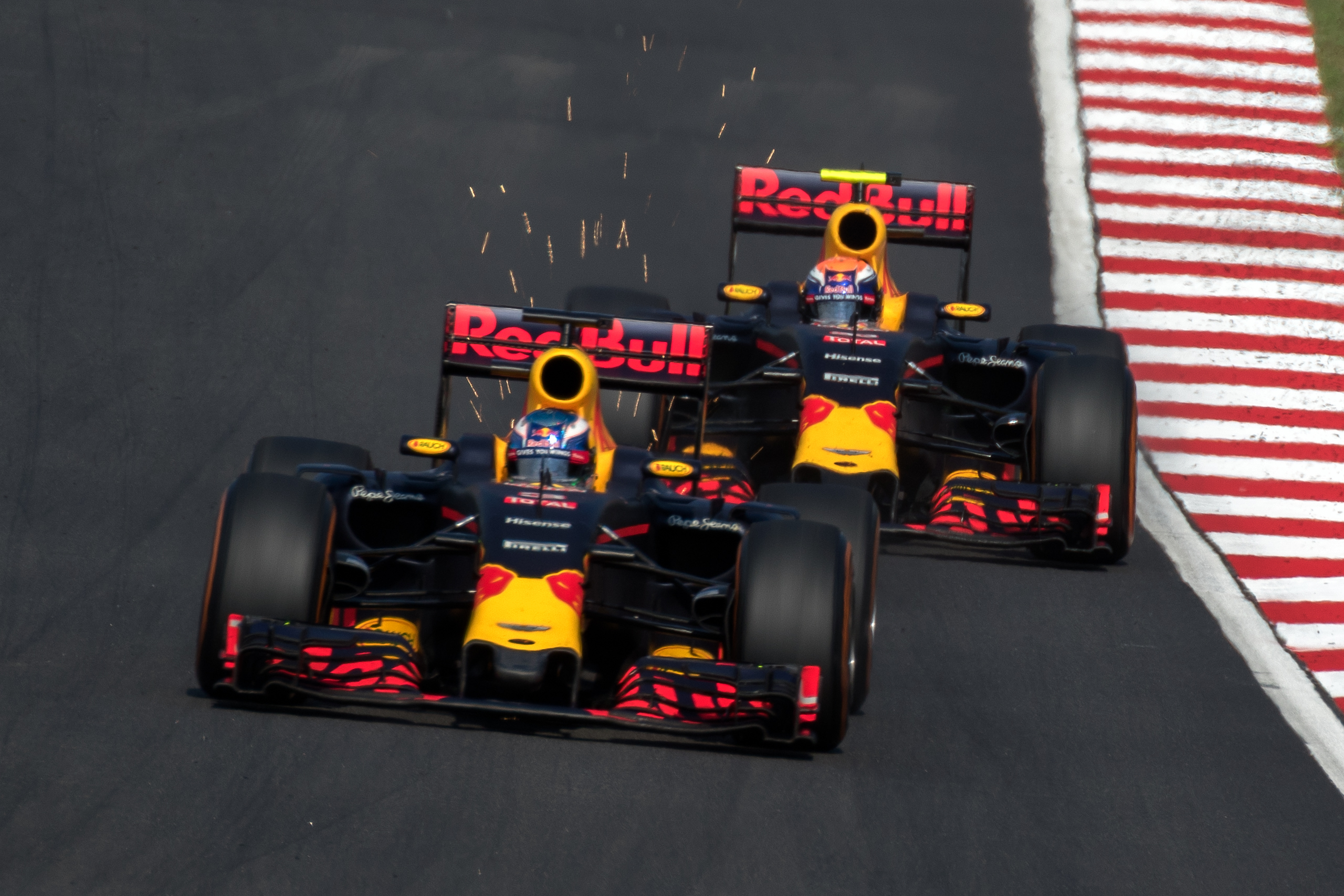
Together Daniel Ricciardo and Max Verstappen won two races during the 2016 season with the Red Bull RB12.

2016 was a much stronger season for Red Bull Racing than 2015, especially after Max Verstappen replaced Daniil Kvyat. Ricciardo stated that he learned from Verstappen's driving techniques to improve as a driver. Red Bull would go on to collect podium finishes with Max Verstappen in Austria and Silverstone, with Daniel Ricciardo in Monaco, Budapest and in Singapore, with both Verstappen and Ricciardo being on the podium in Germany and Malaysia. Daniel Ricciardo collected his 4th career victory in Malaysia after Lewis Hamilton's engine failure. Verstappen had challenged for the victory but was compromised due to an incident at the start between Vettel and Rosberg leading to Verstappen referring to Vettel as 'crazy'. This incident was the latest flare-up between Vettel and Verstappen after the two disagreed over a first corner collision at the Belgian Grand Prix which resulted in Max failing to score at a race where he started on the front row, outqualifying his teammate for only the 2nd time, in which a large number of Dutch fans had travelled to see him race.

Towards the end of the Brazilian Grand Prix Verstappen dropped to 14th after changing back to wet tyres. He then gained 11 places in the closing 16 laps to finish in third place.

Red Bull Racing finished second in the Constructors' Championship that year, with Daniel Ricciardo taking third in the Drivers' Championship.

===== 2017 season =====
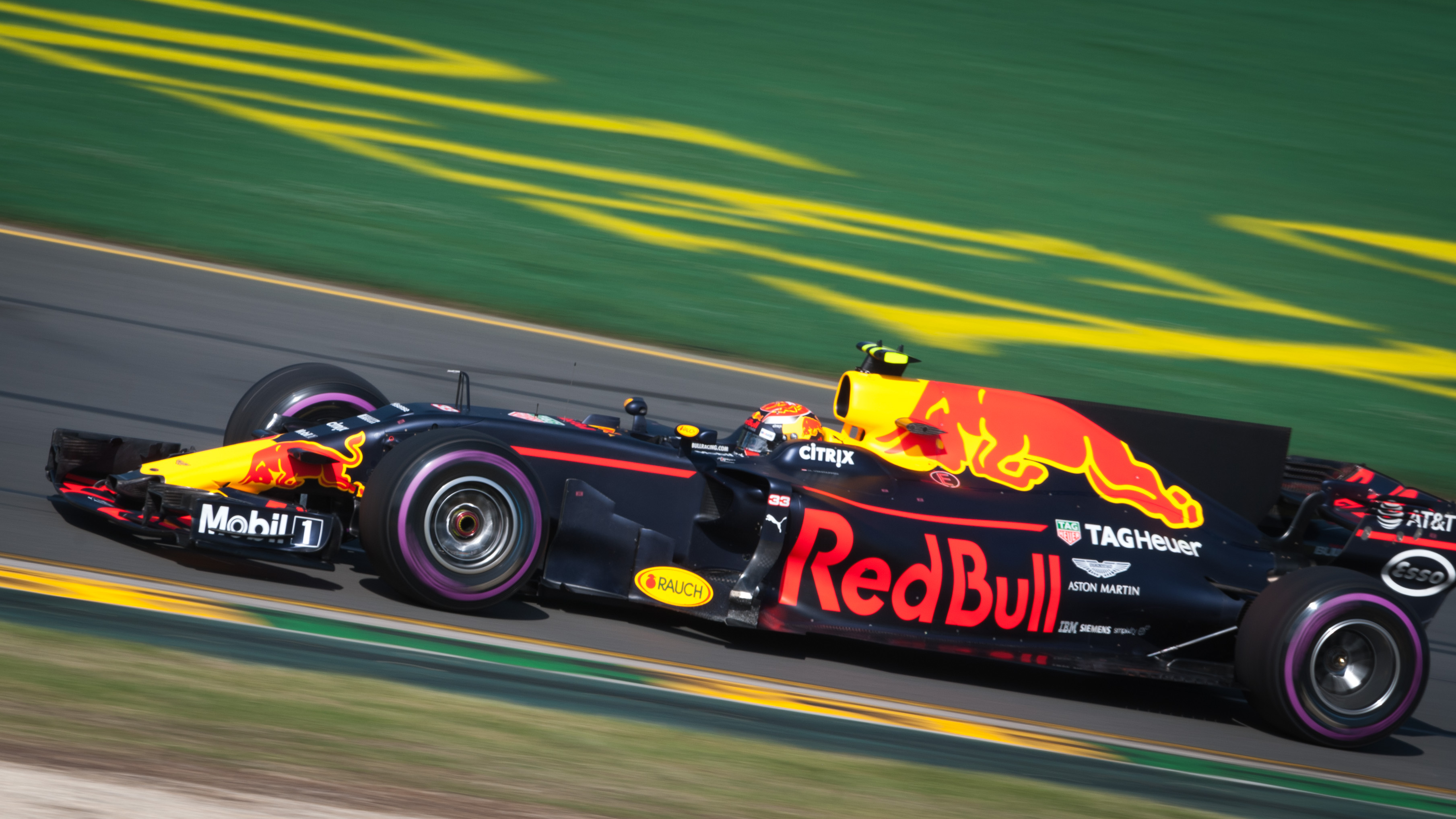
Max Verstappen during the 2017 Australian Grand Prix

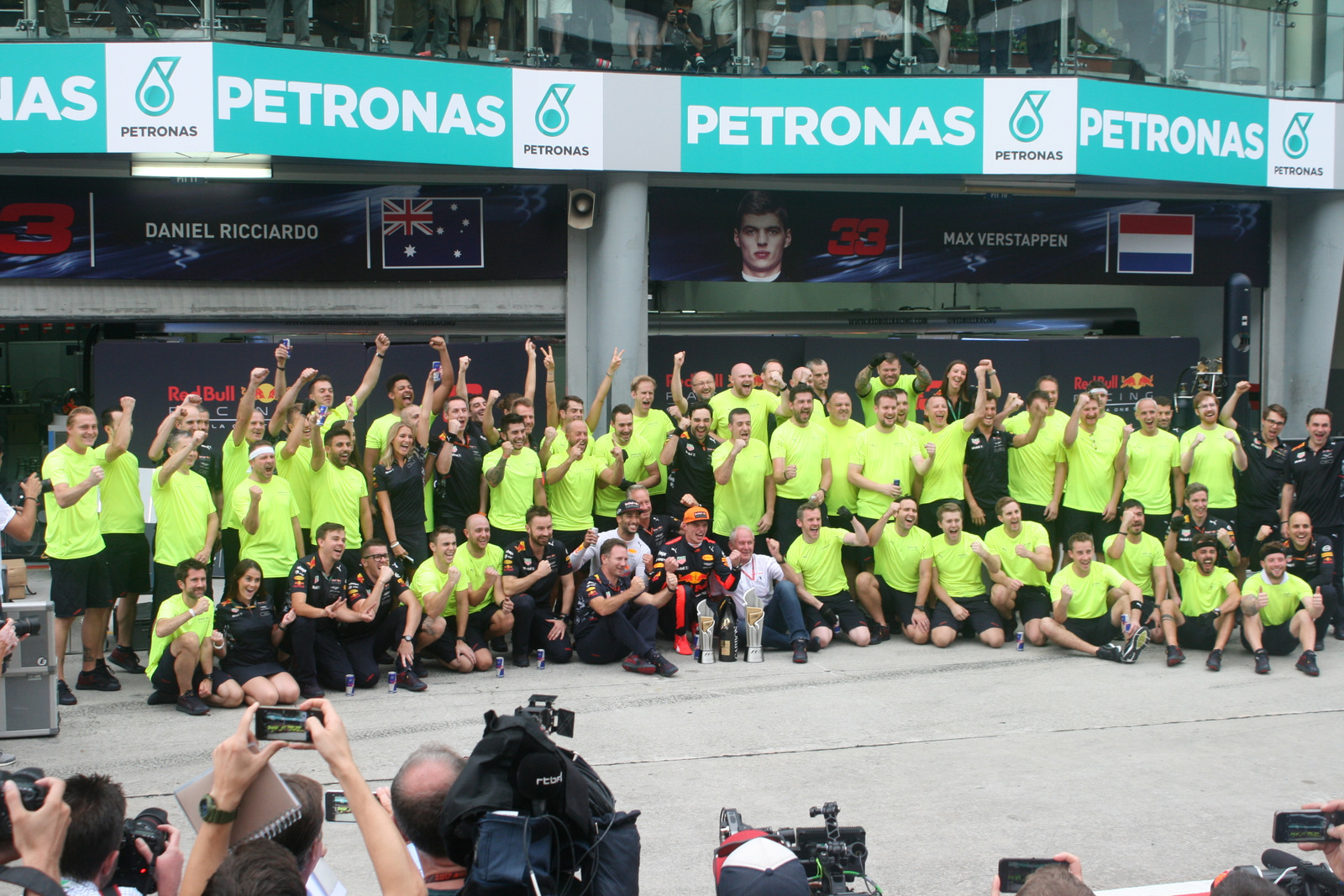
Red Bull Racing celebrates a double podium finish in the 2017 Malaysian Grand Prix.

In 2017, Red Bull Racing retained their 2016 driver line-up and continued using TAG Heuer-branded Renault engines. In the first race in Australia, Ricciardo retired on lap 25, in a weekend plagued with problems for him, while Verstappen finished 5th.

Verstappen suffered various reliability issues with the car, suffering three retirements due to the engine and one due to an electric problem at the Canadian Grand Prix. He was also involved in three first-lap collisions that ended in retirement.

The team won three races in 2017; Ricciardo won the Azerbaijan Grand Prix after starting tenth, while Verstappen won the Malaysian Grand Prix and the Mexican Grand Prix. They also scored a double podium at the Japanese Grand Prix with Verstappen in second and Ricciardo in third. In the Drivers' Championship, Ricciardo finished fifth with 200 points and Verstappen sixth with 168 points. The team finished third in the Constructors' Championship with 368 points.

===== 2018 season =====
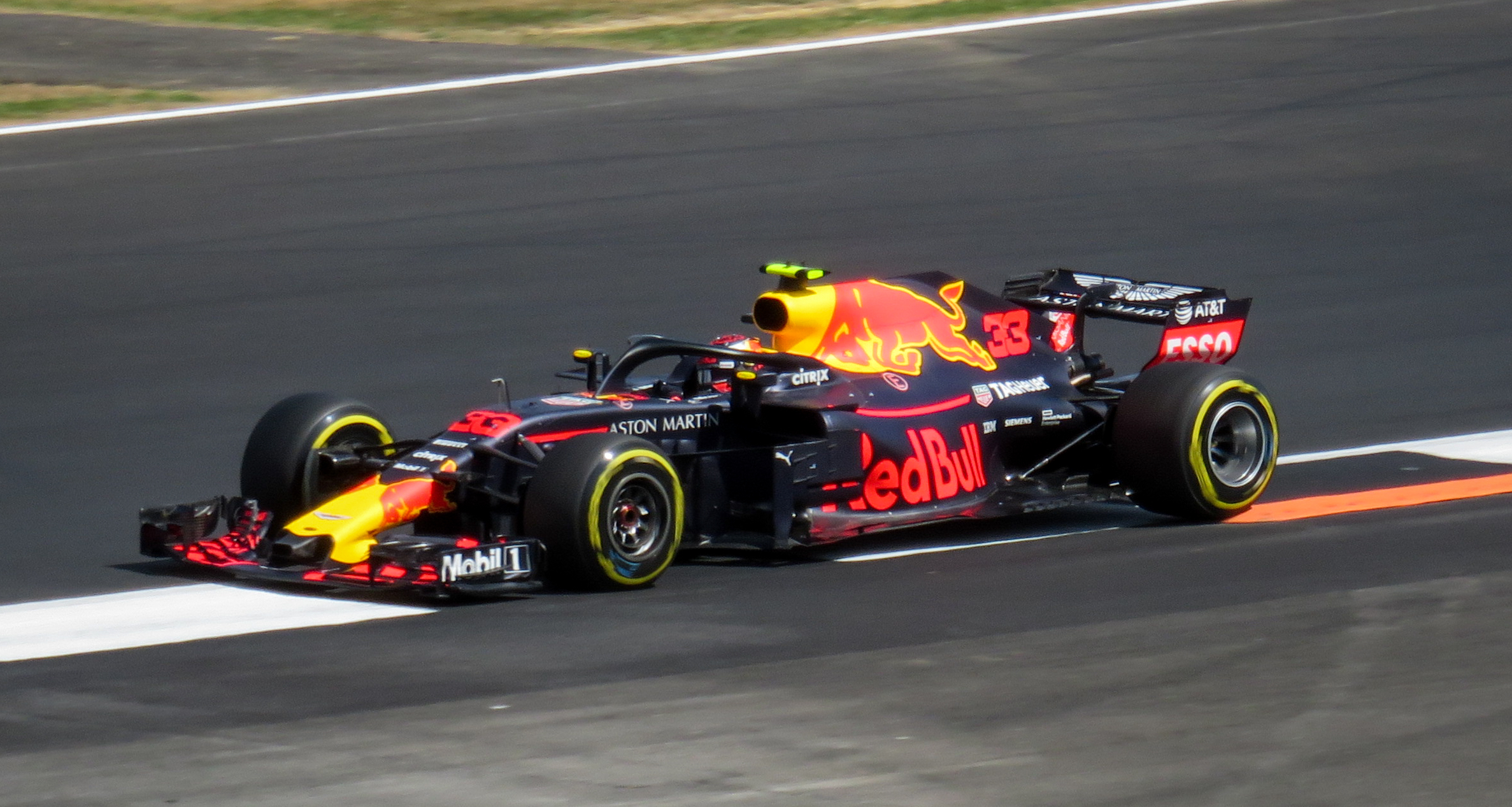
Max Verstappen at the 2018 British Grand Prix at the Silverstone Circuit

Ricciardo and Verstappen were both retained by the team for the 2018 season. On 25 September 2017, it was announced that Aston Martin would become Red Bull Racing's title sponsor from 2018.

The team suffered a double retirement at the Bahrain Grand Prix; Ricciardo retired on lap 2 with an electrical issue, whilst Verstappen retired two laps later. Ricciardo then took the team's first win of the season at the following race, the Chinese Grand Prix, having started sixth on the grid. During the Azerbaijan Grand Prix, both drivers crashed into each other at Turn 1. The team achieved a podium at the Spanish Grand Prix with Verstappen in 3rd place, while Ricciardo achieved 5th place. At the Monaco Grand Prix Red Bull had a dominant car due to its highly efficient, high down-force setup. Ricciardo scored a pole position, and despite running into an engine issue costing him power, he eventually won the race. This incident re-ignited the bad relationship with its engine manufacturer, Renault. Meanwhile, Verstappen crashed during free practice 3 and started from 20th on the grid, finishing the race in 9th place. This race also put an end to a streak of incidents for Verstappen. Monaco was also the last race that saw Daniel Ricciardo on the podium with Red Bull, with him parting ways with the team and joining rival team Renault at the end of the season.

The European season saw consistent podiums and a good form, with Verstappen winning Red Bull's home race at the Red Bull Ring during the Austrian Grand Prix. The second half of the season saw great form from Verstappen and good development of the car, as Verstappen scored 6 out of 8 possible podiums, and was the driver which scored the most points following the 2018 World Champion Lewis Hamilton. Ricciardo had a spree of mechanical issues during the second half of the season, suffering 7 retirements in total and no podiums after the first six races. The Mexican Grand Prix was Red Bull's first front-row lock-out in the turbo-hybrid era, with Ricciardo on pole position and Verstappen winning the race after starting in second place.

Verstappen nearly scored a back-to-back win at the Brazilian Grand Prix but clashed with rival Esteban Ocon as the latter tried to unlap himself, costing him the victory. Following the race the drivers conflicted, resulting in 2 days of public service for Verstappen, which he completed on 9 February 2019. Ricciardo's multiple retirements would end up costing both himself and Red Bull key points in the Drivers' and Constructors' Championships. Verstappen would finish the 2018 season in 4th place, just 3 points behind Kimi Räikkönen while Daniel Ricciardo would finish the season in 6th place, behind Valtteri Bottas. Red Bull would finish the season in 3rd place behind Mercedes and Ferrari.

By the French Grand Prix, Red Bull, encouraged by the progress of Honda in the sister team Scuderia Toro Rosso, decided that in 2019 it would officially end its relationship with Renault for the Honda power.

=== Honda engines (2019–2025) ===
==== Works-era (2019–2021) ====
===== 2019 season =====
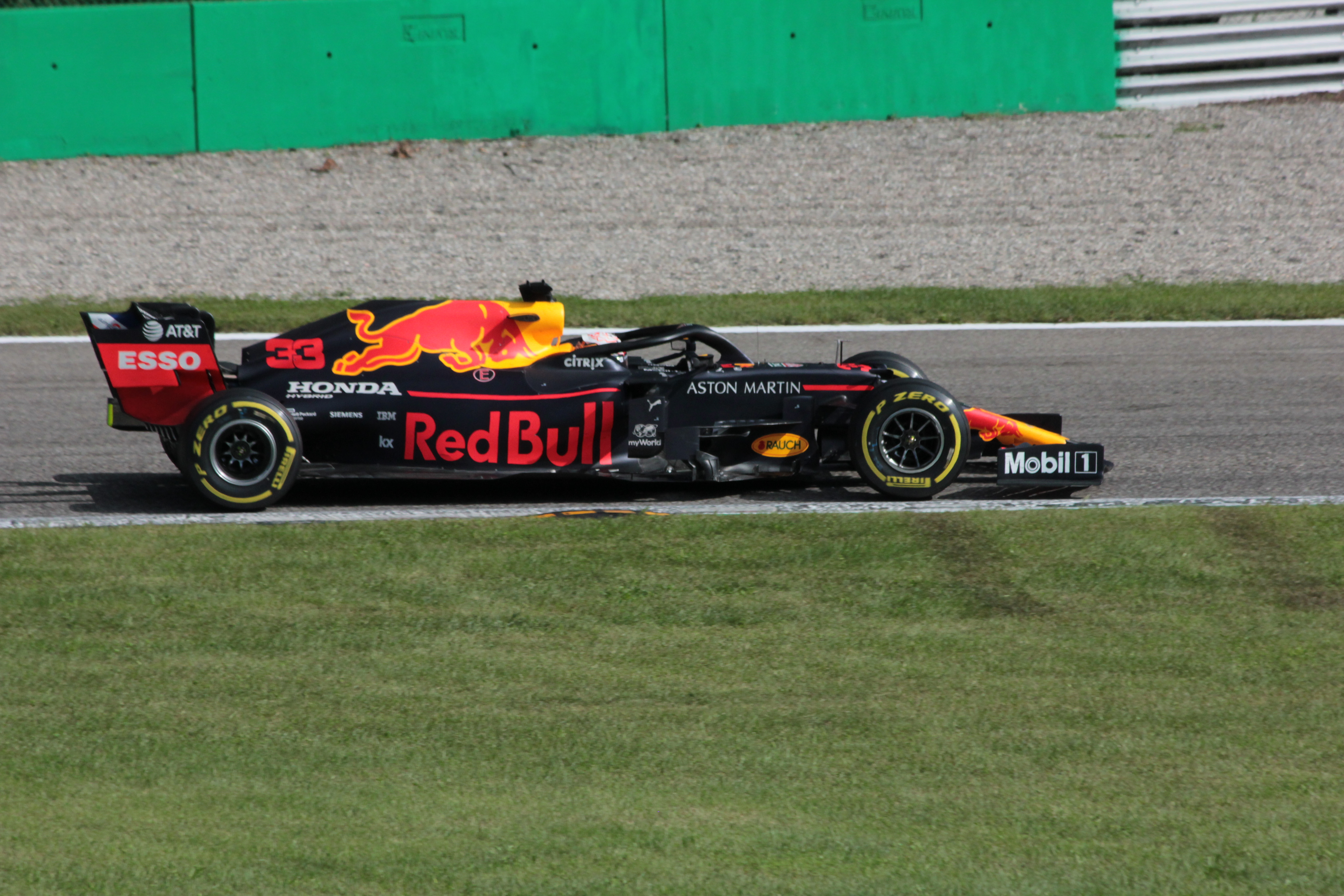
Max Verstappen at the 2019 Italian Grand Prix. The 2019 season marked a switch to Honda power after Red Bull's relationship with Renault broke down.

Preceding the 2018 French Grand Prix, Red Bull Racing confirmed they were to utilise full-works Honda power units from 2019 to 2020, signing a two-year deal and thus ending their twelve-year partnership with Renault. The switch to Honda marked the first time since 2008 that Honda supplied two teams in the sport at the same time.

Pierre Gasly was promoted from Toro Rosso to replace Daniel Ricciardo, who had left the team for Renault.

On 12 August 2019, it was announced that Alex Albon would move to Red Bull Racing for the rest of the season, replacing Gasly, who returned to Toro Rosso.

===== 2020 season =====
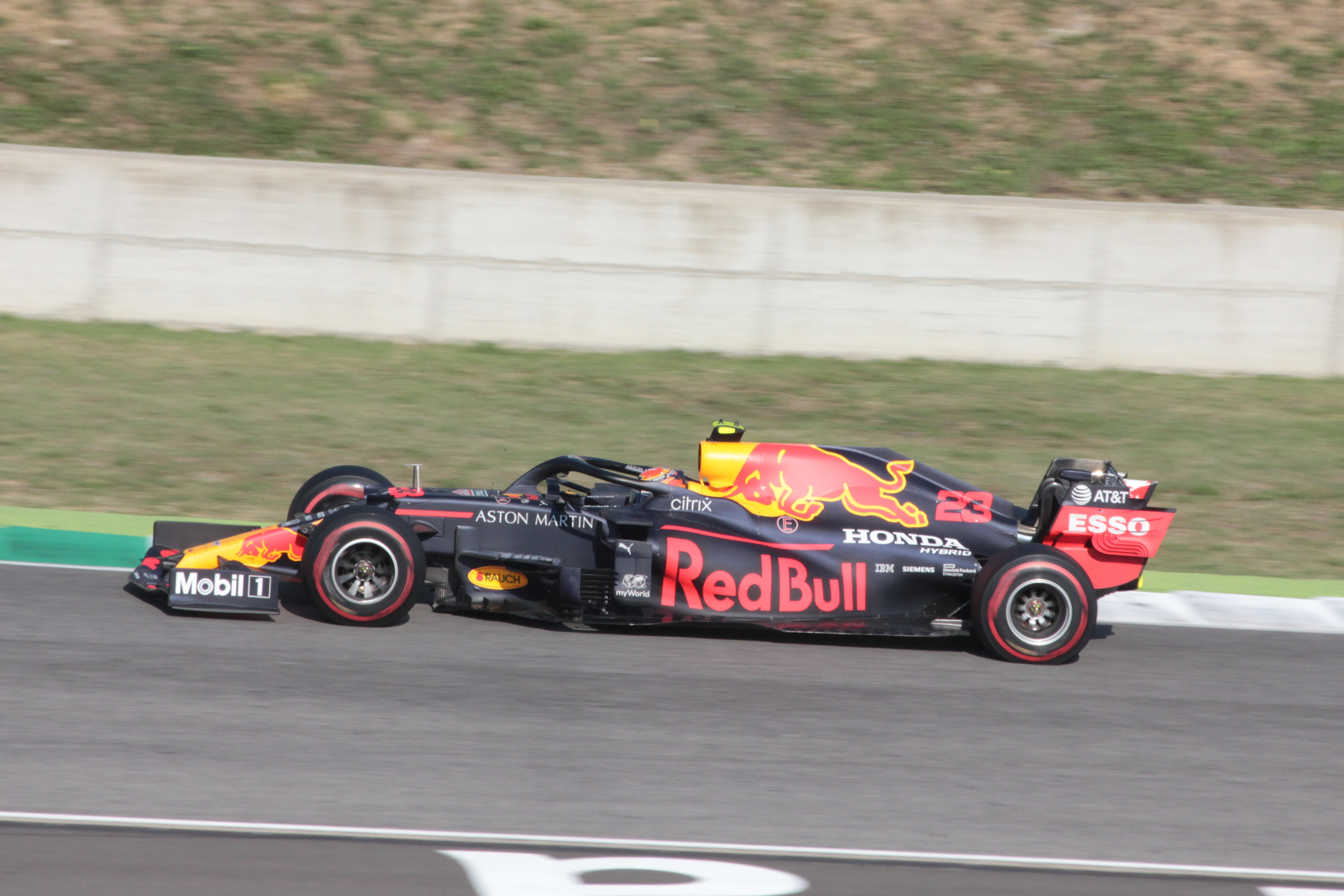
Albon racing at the 2020 Tuscan Grand Prix

For the 2020 season, the team retained Max Verstappen and Alex Albon as their line-up.

Because of a modified calendar due to the COVID-19 pandemic, the first race of the season was the Austrian Grand Prix on 5 July 2020. Toward the beginning of the race, Max Verstappen's Red Bull was retired due to a technical issue. Later in this race, whilst making a charge for his first podium, Alex Albon was involved in an incident with Lewis Hamilton which led to the Red Bull leaving the track and finishing in thirteenth. For the next six rounds, Verstappen finished in the podium positions including winning the 70th Anniversary Grand Prix. Meanwhile, Albon consistently scored points but failed to finish with a podium. During the Italian Grand Prix, Alex Albon had an incident with Pierre Gasly at turn 1 dropping him to fifteenth and was also given a five-second penalty for pushing Romain Grosjean during lap 5 leading to him finishing fifteenth. On the other hand, Verstappen had another mechanical issue and retired on lap 3. The next week, however, Albon scored his first-ever Formula One podium at the Tuscan Grand Prix finishing third while Verstappen had a collision with Gasly forcing him to retire. For the rest of the season, Verstappen managed to finish in the podium every race but three and Albon finished with one more.

The team ended the season in second in the World Constructors' Championship with 319 points. In the World Drivers' Championship, Verstappen finished third with 214 points and Albon finished seventh with 105 points. Following the season, Red Bull announced that Sergio Perez would replace Alex Albon as the second Red Bull driver for the 2021 season.

===== 2021 season =====
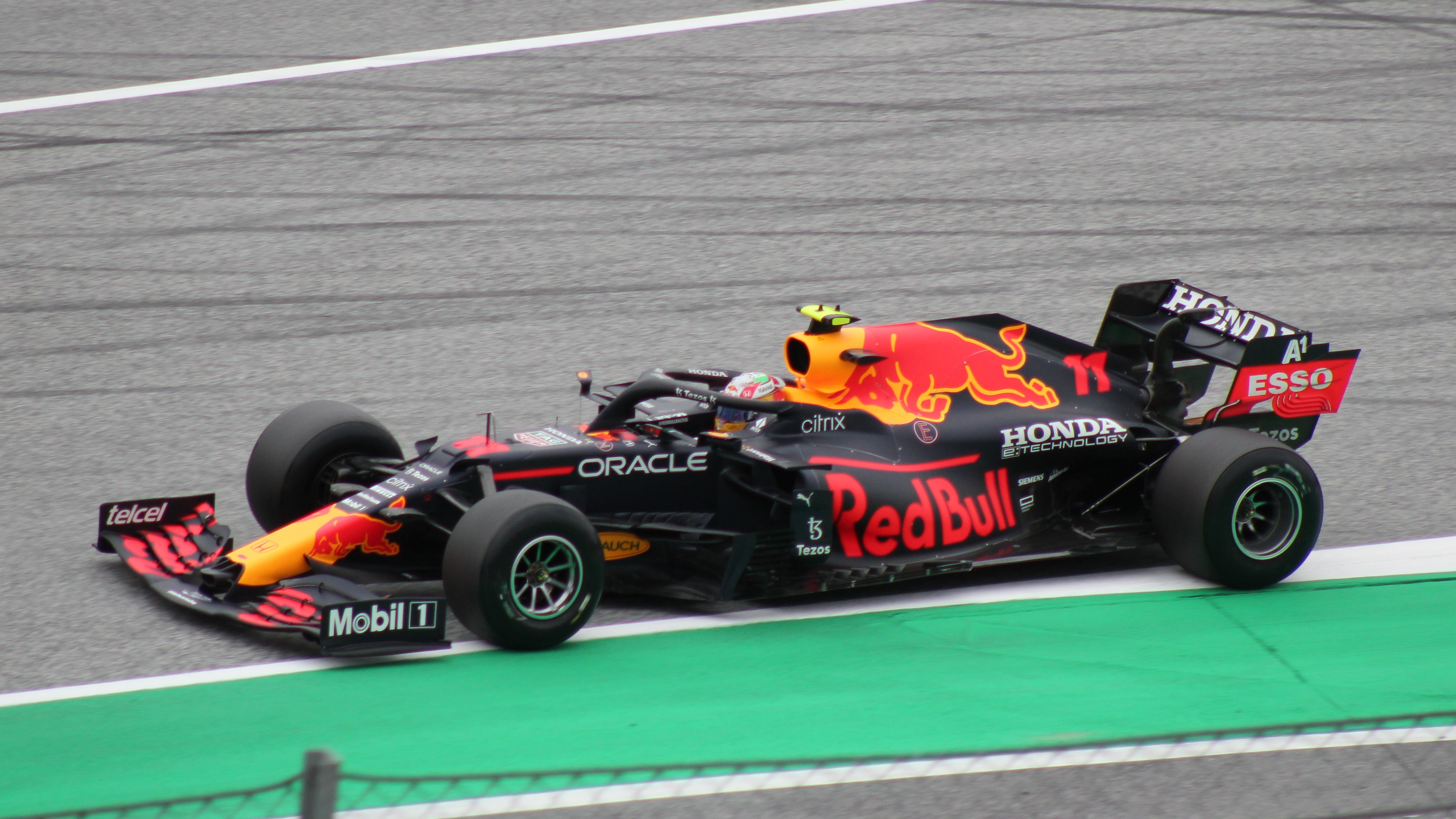
Pérez at the 2021 Austrian Grand Prix. His teammate Verstappen would win the championship, giving Red Bull its first Drivers' Championship since 2013.

In October 2020, engine manufacturer Honda announced it would end its full-works participation in Formula One at the end of the 2021 season. Verstappen was contracted to continue racing for the team with experienced Mexican Sergio Pérez becoming his teammate as Albon took the reserve driver role. Verstappen took pole position at the season-opening Bahrain Grand Prix. Verstappen was later out-qualified by Sergio Pérez at the 2021 Emilia Romagna Grand Prix, but went on to win the race and be just one point behind Lewis Hamilton in the Drivers' Championship standings. At the Monaco Grand Prix, Red Bull Racing took the lead of the Constructors' Championship for the first time since the 2013 Brazilian Grand Prix as a result of another Verstappen win and a poor result for Mercedes. Verstappen also took the lead in the championship for the first time in his career after the race. In the Azerbaijan Grand Prix, Verstappen led the majority of the race and looked set to win before a late-race tyre blowout. Pérez won the race. Verstappen then took pole and won the next three races while Pérez took one more podium in France to grow Red Bull's championship lead.

At Silverstone, Red Bull was beaten in Friday qualifying but Verstappen won the sprint on Saturday to claim a 4th consecutive pole position. During the race, Hamilton and Verstappen made contact at Copse corner, resulting in Verstappen crashing out of the race. In Hungary, both Red Bulls suffered severe damage in a first-lap accident triggered by Mercedes' Valtteri Bottas. Pérez was forced to retire from the race, while Verstappen managed to salvage a 9th-place finish. In Spa, Verstappen took pole and won a rain-shortened race in which half points were awarded. In Italy, Hamilton and Verstappen made contact yet again at the Rettifilo chicane which resulted in both drivers retiring from the race, and Verstappen receiving a 3-place grid penalty for the next race, as the stewards judged him at fault for the collision. At the Abu Dhabi Grand Prix, Verstappen took pole position, his first since Austin. He secured his first world championship title with a last lap overtake on Hamilton, the first championship for the team since 2013.

On 10 October 2022, the FIA announced that Red Bull were one of two teams who had breached the 2021 Financial Regulations applicable during the season, with Red Bull committing what was described as "a Procedural Breach and a Minor Financial Overspend (less than 5% of the Cost Cap)." On 28 October 2022, the FIA announced that Red Bull had entered an Accepted Breach Agreement; in summary, Red Bull were in breach of 13 points of non-compliance. The agreement resulted in a $7m fine and a 10% reduction in permitted aerodynamic research.

==== Red Bull Powertrains collaboration with Honda (2022–2025) ====
===== 2022 season =====
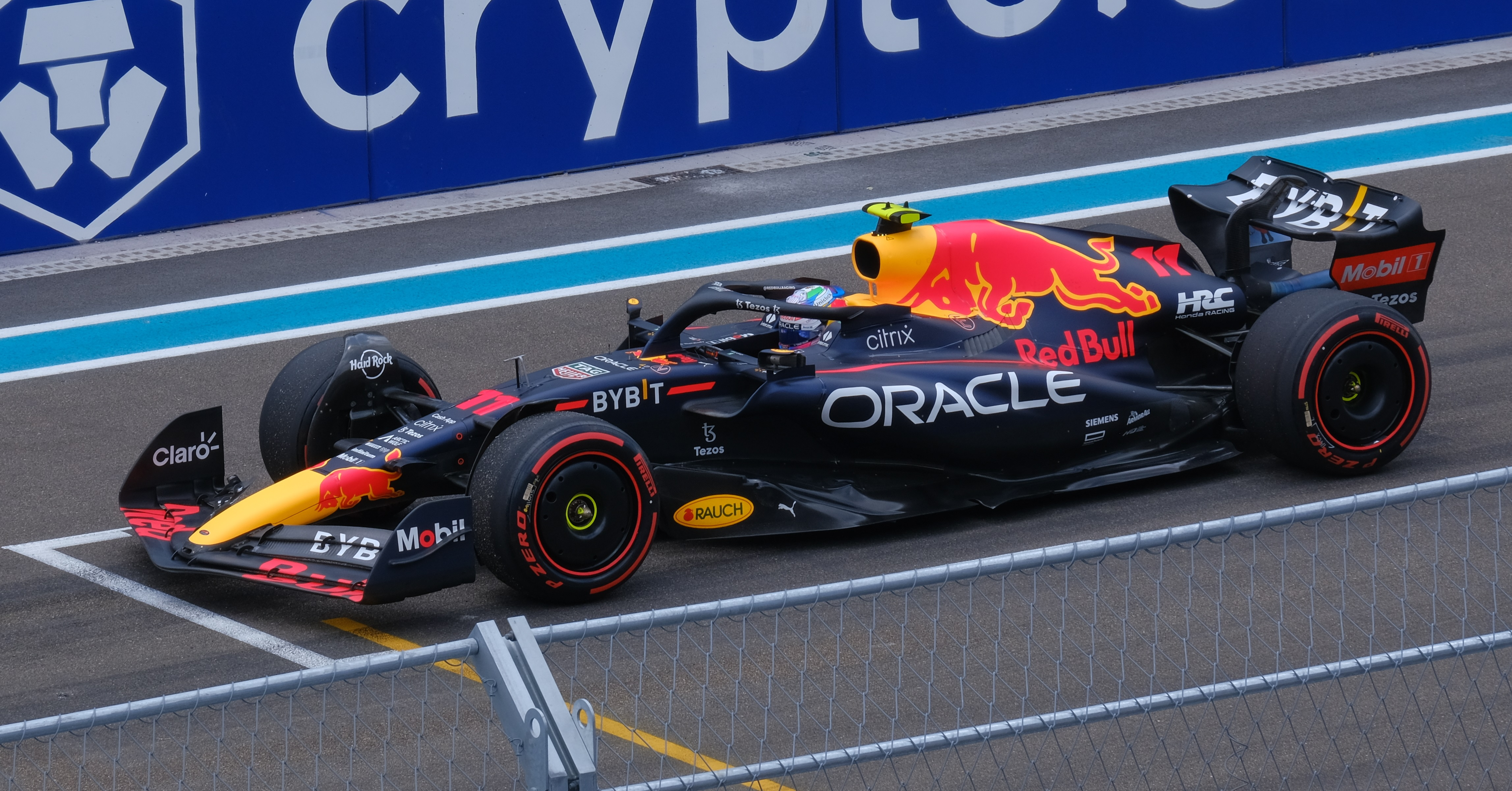
Sergio Pérez at the 2022 Miami Grand Prix. This season marked Red Bull's first Constructors' Championship since 2013.

American multinational software company Oracle became the team's title sponsor for the season.

Following Honda's withdrawal as a works entity after 2021, an engine development freeze lobbied by Red Bull allowed them to sign a deal with Honda to use their engines until the end of 2024 (this would later be extended until 2025). The initial deal would see Red Bull receive the Honda engine I.P and then construct and maintain the engines through a newly formed company named Red Bull Powertrains Limited which also took over part of Honda's Milton Keynes facility. This was only made possible by the engine freeze being agreed upon as Red Bull, at the time, did not have the ability to further develop the Honda engine and without the freeze, there were concerns of falling behind rival manufacturers. For the 2022 season, to reflect Honda's initial decision to withdraw, it was agreed that Red Bull would rebrand the Honda engines as RBPT power units.

During the season, as future regulations were announced for the next generation of power units for the 2026 season, that initial deal was scrapped and another was created that would see Honda remain involved and retain all I.P of its engines and agree to continue to manufacture, supply and maintain the engines until the end of the current regulations at the conclusion of the 2025 season. Despite their withdrawal, Honda developed and manufactured an improved power unit in time for the 2022 season – which would be used up to the end of 2024 – and will continue to provide trackside support and maintenance. The Honda-Red Bull deal was later extended to include the 2025 season.

On 27 July, in Morocco, official information was published on the approval of an application submitted jointly by Porsche and Red Bull GmbH in which Porsche acquired 50% of the shares in Red Bull Technology, the parent company of Red Bull Racing and its Formula One program. This application had to be filed with the antitrust authorities of up to 20 countries, including outside the European Union. The press release was due to go out for the Austrian GP, however the FIA did not approve the regulations for the 2026 engines before 29 June as planned, delaying official confirmation of Porsche's entry into Formula One. By March 2023, Porsche had decided to abandon its planned entry into F1.

Max Verstappen secured the sixth Drivers' World Championship for the team at the Japanese Grand Prix, dominating much of the season winning 15 out of 22 races. He then won the United States Grand Prix to secure the Constructors' World Championship for Red Bull, their fifth overall and the first since 2013.

===== 2023 season =====
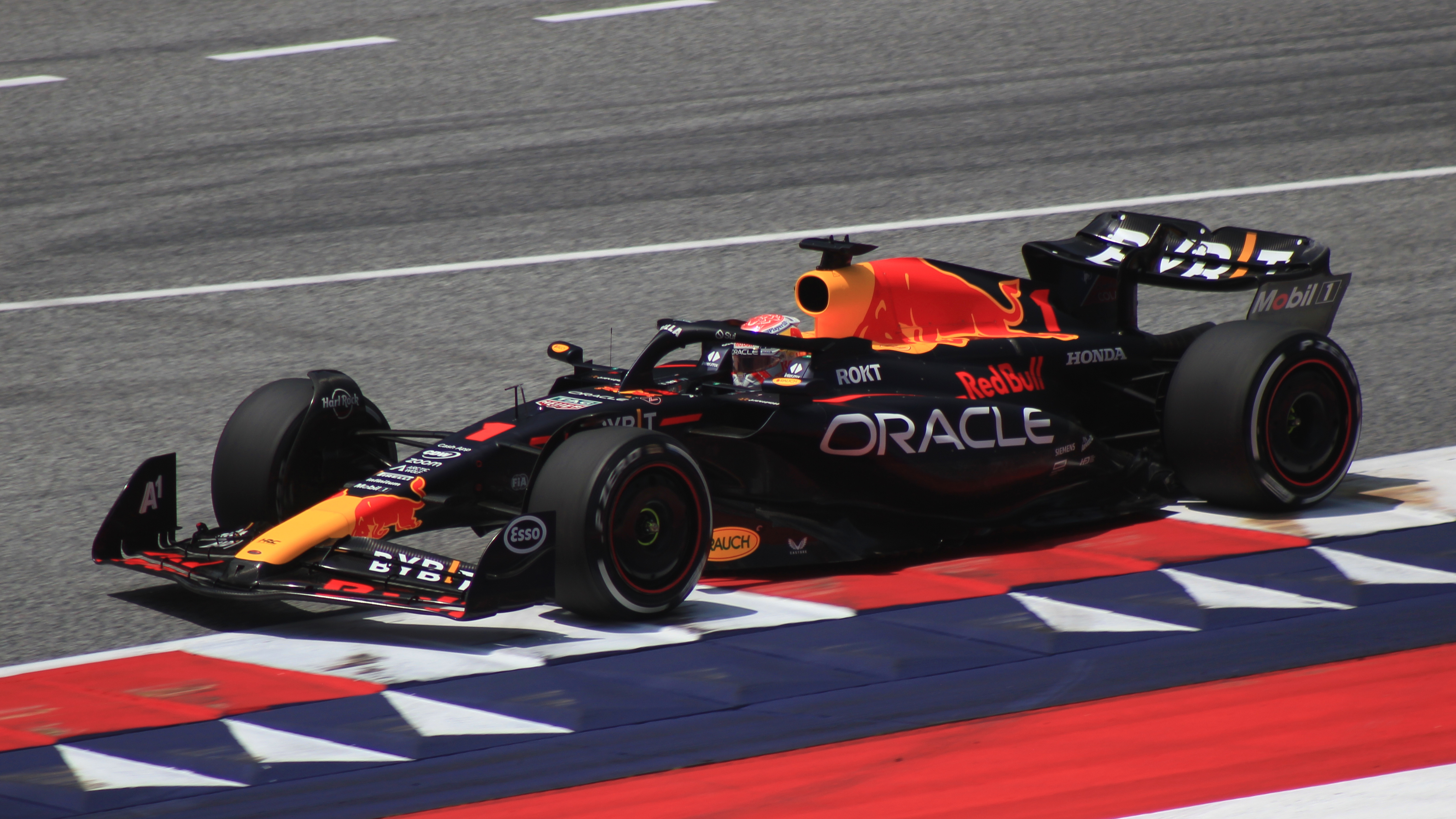
Max Verstappen at the 2023 Austrian Grand Prix. Verstappen and Red Bull set numerous Formula One constructors' records in 2023.

Red Bull Racing retained their 2022 line-up, defending World Champion Max Verstappen and teammate Sergio Pérez, for the 2023 season. To reflect the re-strengthened deal agreed upon in 2022, Honda returned to being the named supplier of engines and its branding was added back to the cars and team kit.

Immediately, the RB19 was impressive, outpacing all the other teams during pre-season testing. This pace was confirmed at the first race in Bahrain when Verstappen, who took a comfortable pole position and race victory – the first of many throughout 2023. His teammate Pérez would himself win two races during the season, taking victory at the Saudi Arabian and Azerbaijan Grands Prix. The only race Red Bull did not win throughout the 2023 season was in Singapore, where Verstappen and Pérez finished fifth and eighth respectively; Verstappen's former Toro Rosso teammate Carlos Sainz Jr. would take the victory at Marina Bay, driving for Ferrari.

Red Bull remained consistent throughout the season, going on to secure the Constructors' Championship after Max Verstappen's triumph at the Japanese Grand Prix. He would then secure the Drivers' Championship at the following Qatar Grand Prix sprint event, with his victory at the Abu Dhabi Grand Prix marking the culmination of one of Red Bull's most successful seasons in Formula One to date. Following the success of the previous year's RB18, the RB19, also designed by Adrian Newey, was noted as being one of the most dominant cars in Formula One history. The RB19 won 21 out of the 22 races in the season, with a 95.45% win rate, outperforming the McLaren MP4/4, another Honda-powered car with a high win rate. The MP4/4 had won 15 out of 16 races in the 1988 season with a 93.8% win rate; the only race it did not win is the 1988 Italian Grand Prix – which, like the 2023 Singapore Grand Prix, was won by Ferrari.

The 2023 Hungarian Grand Prix, the twelfth consecutive race win for Red Bull, set the record for most consecutive wins by a constructor, beating the record of eleven which had been held by McLaren since the 1988 Belgian Grand Prix. The streak was subsequently extended to fifteen, with wins at the Belgian, Dutch, and Italian Grands Prix. In addition, Verstappen became the first driver to surpass 1,000 laps led in a single season, and became the only driver to complete every racing lap in the 2023 season.

===== 2024 season =====
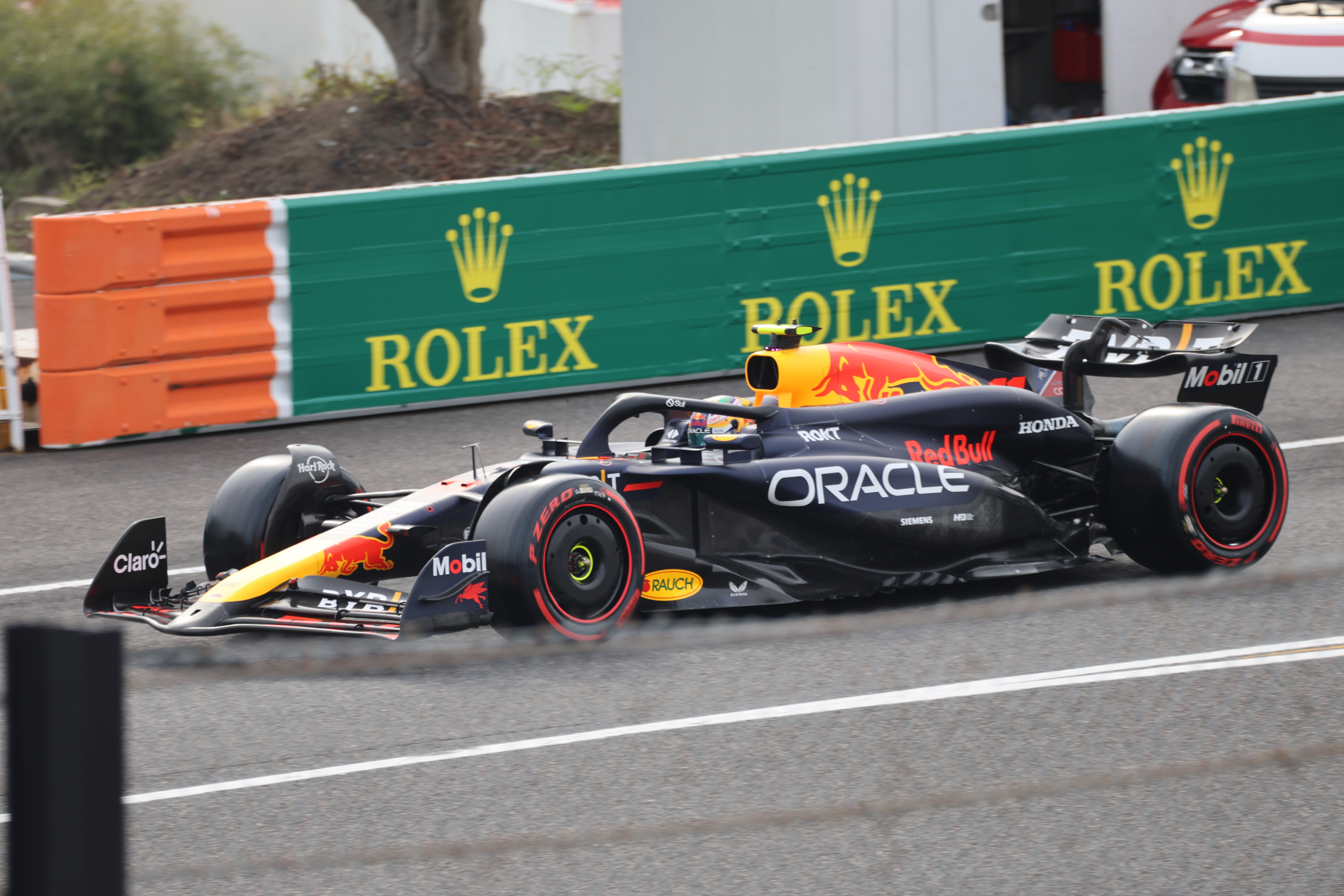
Sergio Pérez at the 2024 Japanese Grand Prix. While Verstappen was able to secure the Drivers' Championship, Red Bull was unable to win the accompanying Constructors' Championship, and Pérez began to underperform; he left the team on mutual terms in December 2024.

Red Bull Racing retained their 2023 line-up, 3-time World Champion Max Verstappen and teammate Sergio Pérez, for the 2024 season. The RB20 was revealed on 15 February, with what Verstappen described as a "bold" and "aggressive" design.

Red Bull Racing comfortably won the first two races, with Verstappen winning with over a ten-second gap from the car behind – both times the second car of Sergio Pérez. However, a brake failure due to overheating in the 2024 Australian Grand Prix caused Max Verstappen to retire.

The team achieved its one-hundredth pole position at the 2024 Chinese Grand Prix, with Max Verstappen on pole. The team had acquired their first pole position fifteen years earlier with Sebastian Vettel at the 2009 Chinese Grand Prix.

During the summer break, Red Bull Racing announced the departure of its Sporting Director, Jonathan Wheatley after 18 years with the team. He remained with the team until the end of the 2024 season, then entered a period of gardening leave in 2025 before beginning his position as team principal at Sauber.

Red Bull slowly recovered from issues stemming from an underfloor tweak at the 2023 Spanish Grand Prix. A new floor was introduced at the 2024 Azerbaijan Grand Prix, slightly improving the RB20's pace. Following a remarkable victory from Max Verstappen after starting from P17 in the 2024 São Paulo Grand Prix, Max scored 31 points during the weekend, securing his championship lead. He went on to take P5 in the 2024 Las Vegas Grand Prix, outscoring his championship rival, Lando Norris, winning his fourth championship at 403 points. Verstappen then won the following Qatar Grand Prix. However, the team lost all mathematical chance of winning their third consecutive constructors' title as Pérez retired with a clutch issue.

===== 2025 season =====
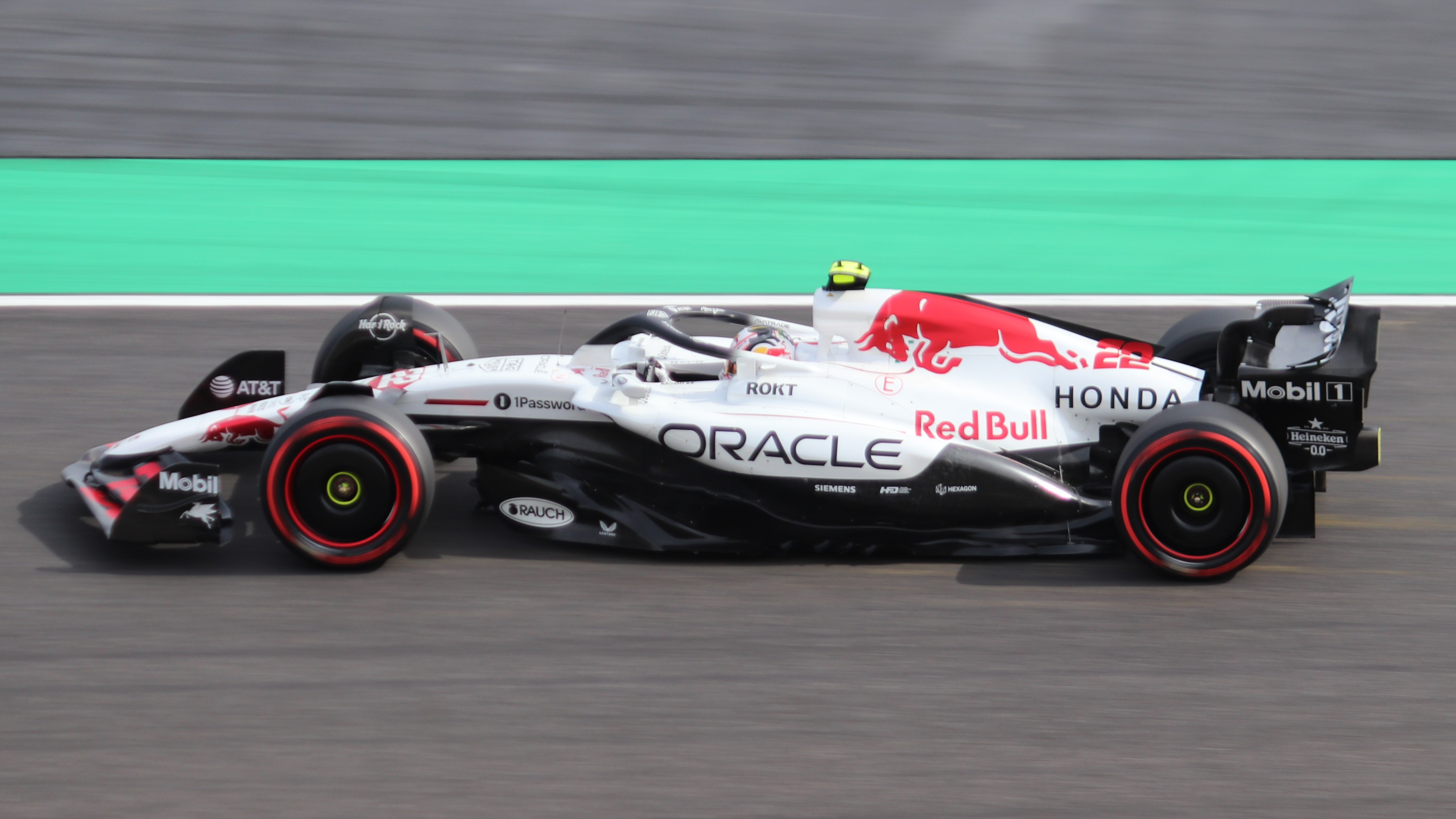
Yuki Tsunoda driving a special white Red Bull RB21 livery at the 2025 Japanese Grand Prix. The season began with Verstappen being paired with Liam Lawson.

During the 2024 Miami Grand Prix race weekend, Red Bull Racing announced the departure of its Chief Technical Officer, Adrian Newey after 19 years with the team. He left for Aston Martin in March 2025. Despite initially having signed a contract until 2026, it was announced on 18 December 2024 that Sergio Pérez had mutually terminated his contract with Red Bull and would leave the team after four seasons. On 19 December, it was announced that Liam Lawson, who had already driven for Red Bull's sister team Scuderia AlphaTauri / RB for parts of 2023 and 2024, would be lining up alongside Verstappen for the 2025 season.

The Red Bull RB21 started the 2025 season off the pace of the pacesetting McLaren MCL39. Despite this, after the first two rounds of the season in Australia and China - the latter event a Sprint - Verstappen sat in second place in the Drivers' Championship just eight points behind early leader Lando Norris. In Australia, Verstappen finished on the podium in second place. Meanwhile, Pérez's replacement Lawson struggled badly, qualifying 18th at his first race for the team, then started from the pit lane due to the team making setup changes to Lawson's car outside of parc fermé regulations after qualifying, then ended up crashing out of the race. At the following race in China, Verstappen scored a podium during the sprint, but finished in fourth for the Grand Prix. Meanwhile, Lawson qualified 20th and last for both the Sprint and the Grand Prix, starting the Grand Prix once again from the pit lane after the team took his car out of parc fermé to make setup changes to the car in an effort to improve the handling of Lawson's car. He finished the Sprint 14th and Grand Prix 16th, but was promoted to 12th in the results after three drivers ahead of him were disqualified for technical infringements, while another driver was given a time penalty for dangerous driving.

Following the race weekend in China, team advisor Helmut Marko revealed to Sky Germany that the team would hold a "crisis meeting" to discuss their disappointing start to the season, and discuss Lawson's future at the team. By 26 March 2025, rumours started to circulate that ahead of the Japanese Grand Prix, Lawson, following his two Grands Prix with the team ending with disappointing results, would be demoted back to sister team Racing Bulls, with their driver Yuki Tsunoda being promoted to Red Bull in Lawson's place. On 27 March 2025, Red Bull confirmed that Yuki Tsunoda would drive for the team from the Japanese Grand Prix onwards.

After the British Grand Prix, Horner was released from his position of CEO and team principal, with Racing Bulls team principal Laurent Mekies taking his place. Horner formally left the team in September after reportedly agreeing to a pre-tax severance deal of £80 million. Under Mekies' supervision, the team took further wins in Italy, Azerbaijan, Austin, Las Vegas, Qatar and Abu Dhabi, amidst a late-season uptick in form that brought Verstappen into title contention. Following the Qatar Grand Prix, it was announced that Tsunoda would be demoted to a reserve driver role following the conclusion of the season. Verstappen was ultimately unable to defend the Drivers' Championship, finishing second to title victor Lando Norris by two points. Following the Abu Dhabi Grand Prix, it was reported that Marko would leave Red Bull after the conclusion of the 2025 season.

=== RBPT-Ford engines (2026–present) ===
==== 2026 season ====
2026 saw significant changes in engine regulations. After months of speculation, Porsche AG confirmed in September 2022 that talks with Red Bull GmbH would not continue. The intention had been to reach an engine and team partnership based on equal footing, but the negotiations never came to fruition. Instead, on 3 February 2023, Ford Motor Company announced a partnership with Red Bull Powertrains that would begin for the 2026 season, providing "expertise in areas including battery cell and electric motor technology as well as power unit control software and analytics" and "combustion engine development" for Red Bull Racing and Racing Bulls, with the option for Ford to acquire the team's majority ownership stake in the future. This concluded the seven-year long-standing Honda partnership (including RBPT rebadging) that began in 2019 due to Honda electing to move to Aston Martin in the same season.

Following the 2025 Qatar Grand Prix, Red Bull announced the promotion of Isack Hadjar from Racing Bulls to partner Verstappen for 2026.

== Corporate information ==
=== Image and marketing ===
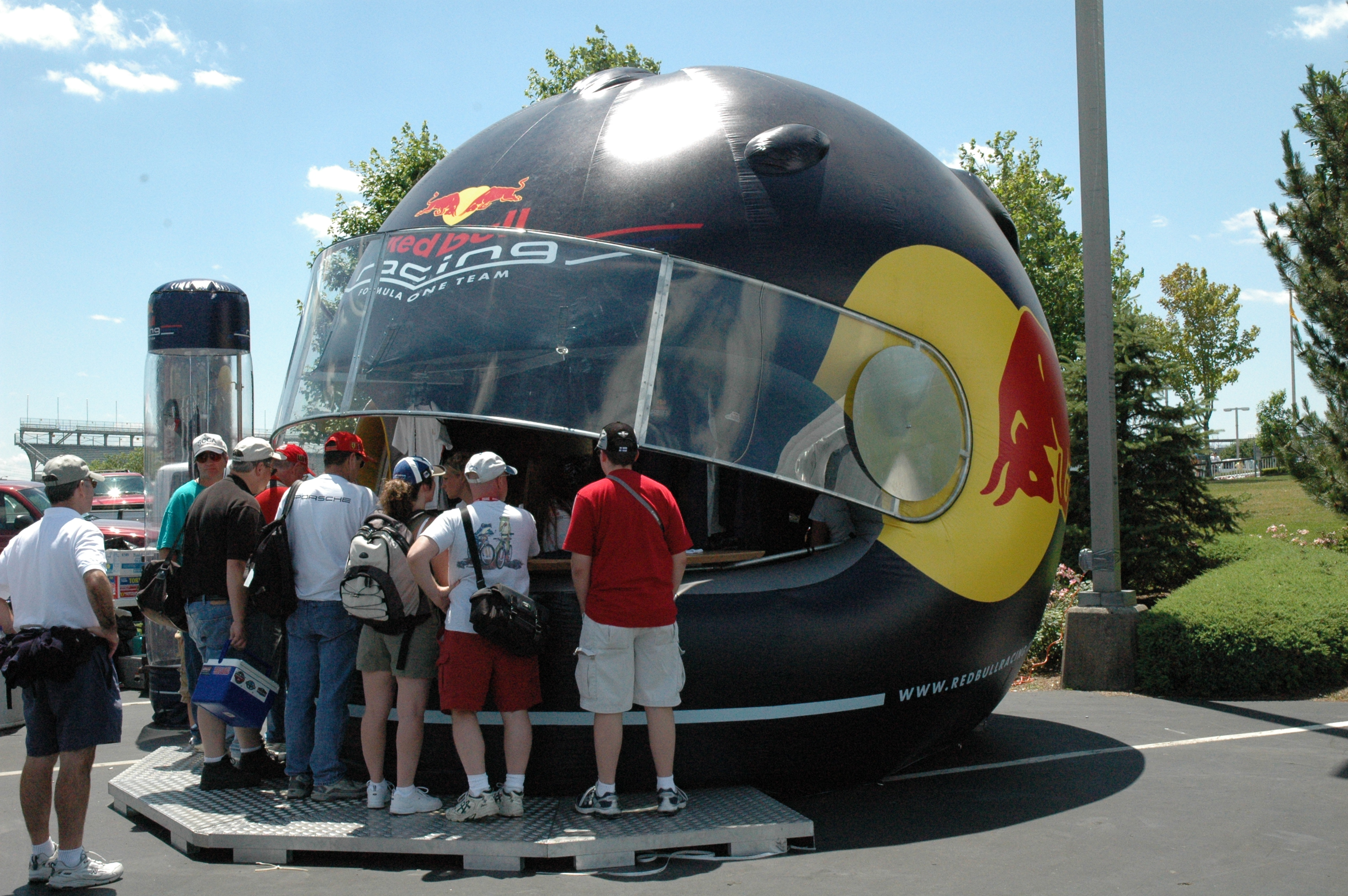
A distinctive RBR helmet-shaped stand

Red Bull has been very vocal about wanting to make Formula One "fun" again. They aimed to accomplish this by employing Mark Gallagher, who was head of marketing for nine years at Jordan. Red Bull also started The Red Bulletin, a sports and adventure magazine that is released four times per race weekend and distributed to the paddock and members of the public from behind the main grandstand at each track.

In the 2006 Monaco Grand Prix, they supported the movie Superman Returns, which continues the line of marketing events begun by the Star Wars: Episode III – Revenge of the Sith promotion of 2005 (in the 2005 race, the pit crew dressed up as clone troopers) and the Ocean's Twelve promotion of 2004, as well as Terminator 3: Rise of the Machines promotion of 2003 when the team ran under the Jaguar Racing banner. When Coulthard finished third in the 2006 race, he donned a Superman cape for his appearance on the podium.

In the 2019 British Grand Prix, 007 logos were used in the livery to replace the Aston Martin logos, to celebrate the 1007th Grand Prix. The cars also had Bond-themed number plates on the underside of their rear wings. Max Verstappen had the number plate from the Aston Martin DB5 from Goldfinger (BMT 216A) while Pierre Gasly's car featured the Aston Martin V8 plate (B549 WUU) from The Living Daylights. Both drivers wore special racing overalls with a print of a single-breasted dinner suit. The 007 logo was first used during their race as Jaguar in the 2002 season to promote Die Another Day.

At the 2024 Goodwood Festival of Speed, Red Bull celebrated its 20th year as a racing team by bringing together past and present drivers for celebrations, including: a parade of Red Bull Formula One cars driven by those drivers, team lead Christian Horner and technical director Adrian Newey; an on-site Red Bull 'Energy Station' with displays and a press and fan meeting place; and photo-ops, including a group photo of Horner and Newey with Red Bull Academy Programme / F1 Academy-championship driver Hamda Al Qubaisi (2023– ) and RBR Formula One drivers David Coulthard (2005–2008), Christian Klien (2005–2006), Mark Webber (2007–2013), Daniel Ricciardo (2014–2018), Max Verstappen (2016– ) and Sergio Perez (2021–2024).

=== Finances ===
Red Bull Racing had revenue of $285.4 million and expenses of $284.4 million in 2011. The revenue came from prize money ($88.8 million), sponsors ($59.7 million), and the remainder from Red Bull. Expenses included $112.8 million in research and development and $82.7 million in salaries for 605 employees.

=== Red Bull Technology ===
Red Bull Technology Limited
- Formerly: Red Bull Racing Holdings Limited (2004–2006)
- Type: Subsidiary
- Industry: Automotive
- Founded: 2005; 21 years ago, in Milton Keynes, England
- Founder: Dietrich Mateschitz; Helmut Marko; Christian Horner
- Headquarters: Milton Keynes, England
- Area served: Worldwide
- Key people: Christian Horner (CEO - 2005-2025); Laurent Mekies (2025-present)
- Products: Transmissions, simulators, hydraulic manifolds, KERS (formerly), battery, MGU-K, MGU-H and ERS
- Services: High performance engineering
- Parent: Red Bull GmbH
- Website: redbulltechnology.com

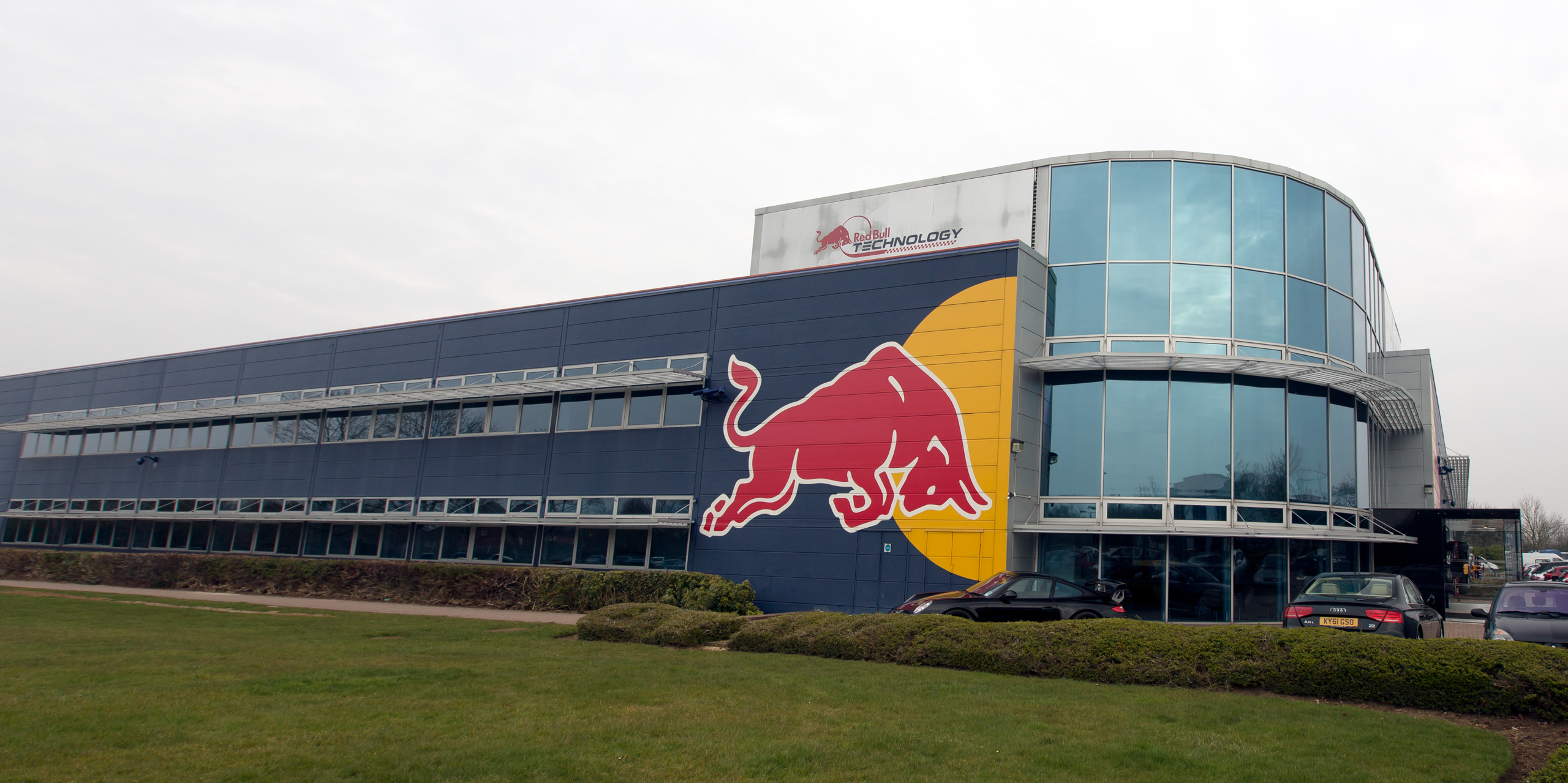
The Red Bull Technology factory in Milton Keynes, Buckinghamshire, England, home of Red Bull Racing since 2004

Red Bull Technology Limited, previously Red Bull Racing Holdings Limited, is the parent company of Red Bull Racing set up to design, engineer, and build the cars for its Formula One team, and previously its sister team Scuderia Toro Rosso. Red Bull Technology was regarded as a loop-hole to allow Red Bull to run two teams with the same car from 2007, which had been prohibited in Formula One since the 1980s. Complaints were issued to the FIA from rival teams, but they were discarded by the sport's governing body. Neither Red Bull Racing nor Scuderia Toro Rosso denied they ran fundamentally the same chassis, but claimed the separate development programs, different engines and in their opinion that the chassis was designed by neither team made it legal.

The regulations were changed in 2010 to forbid the use of identical cars between teams, and Toro Rosso no longer had its cars produced by Red Bull Technology. Since then the team indigenously designed and built their cars, having built the necessary infrastructure in-house.

Red Bull Technology also partnered Scuderia Toro Rosso, later Scuderia AlphaTauri and Visa Cash App RB as their transmission partner and supplier from 2006 onwards, and KERS partner and supplier from 2012 to 2013. They also served Team Lotus, later Caterham F1 as transmission supplier from 2011 to 2014 and KERS supplier from 2012 to 2013.

Red Bull Technology uses rFactor Pro driving simulation software.

=== Red Bull Advanced Technologies ===
Red Bull Advanced Technologies Limited
- Type: Private limited company (subsidiary of Red Bull GmbH)
- Industry: Automotive
- Founded: Milton Keynes, 2022
- Founder: Helmut Marko; Christian Horner
- Headquarters: Milton Keynes, England
- Area served: Worldwide
- Key people: Laurent Mekies; Rob Gray (Technical Director); Ben Butler (Chief Designer)
- Owner: Red Bull GmbH
- Parent: Red Bull GmbH
- Website: redbulladvancedtechnologies.com

Red Bull Advanced Technologies Limited (RBAT) is owned by Red Bull GmbH and serves as the commercial technology and engineering services arm of Red Bull Racing. The company is based in the United Kingdom, in a dedicated facility, adjacent to the Red Bull Racing Formula One facilities.

Red Bull Advanced Technologies in collaboration with Aston Martin developed the Aston Martin Valkyrie sports car.

Red Bull Advanced Technologies in a collaborative effort with Dallara and IndyCar, developed the 'aeroscreen' safety device for usage in the IndyCar Series.

Red Bull Advanced Technologies is developing a high-performance three-person submersible for private or research use. Led by Technical Director Rob Gray, the project forms part of RBAT's broader "land, sea, and air" engineering portfolio.

Red Bull Advanced Technologies announced in June 2022 that they were developing a hypercar completely in-house, named the RB17, in line with their Formula One car naming scheme. The car would be designed by Adrian Newey, Chief Technical Officer at Red Bull Racing. Only 50 units are to be made, with production scheduled to begin in 2025. The prototype was revealed to the public at Goodwood Festival of Speed by Oracle Red Bull Racing Team in July 2024.

== Sister Formula One team ==
In the autumn of 2005, Red Bull announced that they had purchased the cash-strapped Minardi Formula One team, and it would be known as Scuderia Toro Rosso (STR) (Italian for Team Red Bull) from 2006 onwards. STR operates as a separate team, but the two share certain technical resources. In 2006, STR used a chassis based on the 2005 Red Bull Racing Red Bull RB1 chassis, originally designed by Jaguar Racing, and Minardi's contracted supply of rev-limited V10 Cosworth engines. It was widely speculated that the 2007 chassis for both teams would be essentially the same Adrian Newey design, although Red Bull was careful to announce that the "STR2 will be built by Red Bull Technology, and Toro Rosso will fully own the intellectual rights of the car". Formula One teams are not allowed to use another team's chassis. STR has been used as a 'B' team for Red Bull Racing, allowing the company to work with more drivers. As of the 2010 season this arrangement was outlawed, and the STR5 is the first Toro Rosso car designed and built in-house. In 2006, Red Bull Racing driver Vitantonio Liuzzi was given a full-time seat with STR alongside another Red Bull sponsored driver, Scott Speed. Liuzzi retained his seat in STR for the 2007 season. Sebastian Vettel replaced Speed in the middle of the 2007 season, and Sébastien Bourdais replaced Liuzzi at STR for the 2008 season. Against expectation, Toro Rosso performed well during the 2008 season and Sebastian Vettel won the 2008 Italian Grand Prix. This meant that STR took their first win before Red Bull Racing, and helped to secure Vettel a drive with Red Bull Racing for 2009 when he also took that team's first win.

For 2020, the team was rebranded as Scuderia AlphaTauri to promote Red Bull's fashion brand of the same name. Scuderia AlphaTauri achieved their maiden Grand Prix win under the new name at the 2020 Italian Grand Prix. The race marked Pierre Gasly's first career race victory and the first for a French driver since Olivier Panis won the 1996 Monaco Grand Prix 24 years prior.

For 2024, the team was rebranded as RB Formula One Team with the full name being Visa Cash App RB Formula One Team, a name that was widely criticised by several fans and media. Daniel Ricciardo and Yuki Tsunoda were retained from the previous season. For 2025, the team was rebranded as Racing Bulls and competed as Visa Cash App Racing Bulls F1 Team. Yuki Tsunoda was retained from the previous season and Isack Hadjar was signed for his rookie season, but after two rounds Tsunoda was promoted to Red Bull Racing, trading places with Liam Lawson, who previously replaced Ricciardo during the final six rounds of the 2024 season.

== Racing record ==
As a constructor, Red Bull Racing have achieved the following statistics:

- Constructors' Championships winning percentage: 27.3%
- Drivers' Championships winning percentage: 36.4%
- Winning percentage: 30.4%

(Bold indicates championships won.)

Year	Name	Car	Engine	Tyres	No.	Drivers	Points	Position
2005	(United Kingdom) Red Bull Racing	RB1	Cosworth TJ2005 3.0 V10	M	14. 15. 15.	(United Kingdom) David Coulthard (Austria) Christian Klien (Italy) Vitantonio Liuzzi	34	7th
2006	(United Kingdom) Red Bull Racing	RB2	Ferrari 056 2.4 V8	M	14. 15. 15.	(United Kingdom) David Coulthard (Austria) Christian Klien (Netherlands) Robert Doornbos	16	7th
2007	(Austria) Red Bull Racing	RB3	Renault RS27 2.4 V8	B	14. 15.	(United Kingdom) David Coulthard (Australia) Mark Webber	24	5th
2008	(Austria) Red Bull Racing	RB4	Renault RS27 2.4 V8	B	9. 10.	(United Kingdom) David Coulthard (Australia) Mark Webber	29	7th
2009	(Austria) Red Bull Racing	RB5	Renault RS27 2.4 V8	B	14. 15.	(Australia) Mark Webber (Germany) Sebastian Vettel	153.5	2nd
2010	(Austria) Red Bull Racing	RB6	Renault RS27-2010 2.4 V8	B	5. 6.	(Germany) **Sebastian Vettel** (Australia) Mark Webber	**498**	**1st**
2011	(Austria) Red Bull Racing Renault	RB7	Renault RS27-2011 2.4 V8	P	1. 2.	(Germany) **Sebastian Vettel** (Australia) Mark Webber	**650**	**1st**
2012	(Austria) Red Bull Racing Renault	RB8	Renault RS27-2012 2.4 V8	P	1. 2.	(Germany) **Sebastian Vettel** (Australia) Mark Webber	**460**	**1st**
2013	(Austria) Infiniti Red Bull Racing Renault	RB9	Renault RS27-2013 2.4 V8	P	1. 2.	(Germany) **Sebastian Vettel** (Australia) Mark Webber	**596**	**1st**
2014	(Austria) Infiniti Red Bull Racing Renault	RB10	Renault Energy F1-2014 1.6 V6 t	P	1. 3.	(Germany) Sebastian Vettel (Australia) Daniel Ricciardo	405	2nd
2015	(Austria) Infiniti Red Bull Racing Renault	RB11	Renault Energy F1-2015 1.6 V6 t	P	3. 26.	(Australia) Daniel Ricciardo (Russia) Daniil Kvyat	187	4th
2016	(Austria) Red Bull Racing	RB12	TAG Heuer 1.6 V6 t	P	3. 26. 33.	(Australia) Daniel Ricciardo (Russia) Daniil Kvyat (Netherlands) Max Verstappen	468	2nd
2017	(Austria) Red Bull Racing	RB13	TAG Heuer 1.6 V6 t	P	3. 33.	(Australia) Daniel Ricciardo (Netherlands) Max Verstappen	368	3rd
2018	(Austria) Aston Martin Red Bull Racing	RB14	TAG Heuer 1.6 V6 t	P	3. 33.	(Australia) Daniel Ricciardo (Netherlands) Max Verstappen	419	3rd
2019	(Austria) Aston Martin Red Bull Racing Honda	RB15	Honda RA619H 1.6 V6 t	P	10. 23. 33.	(France) Pierre Gasly (Thailand) Alex Albon (Netherlands) Max Verstappen	417	3rd
2020	(Austria) Aston Martin Red Bull Racing Honda	RB16	Honda RA620H 1.6 V6 t	P	23. 33.	(Thailand) Alex Albon (Netherlands) Max Verstappen	319	2nd
2021	(Austria) Red Bull Racing Honda	RB16B	Honda RA621H 1.6 V6 t	P	11. 33.	(Mexico) Sergio Pérez (Netherlands) **Max Verstappen**	585.5	2nd
2022	(Austria) Oracle Red Bull Racing	RB18	Red Bull RBPTH001 1.6 V6 t	P	1. 11.	(Netherlands) **Max Verstappen** (Mexico) Sergio Pérez	**759**	**1st**
2023	(Austria) Oracle Red Bull Racing	RB19	Honda RBPTH001 1.6 V6 t	P	1. 11.	(Netherlands) **Max Verstappen** (Mexico) Sergio Pérez	**860**	**1st**
2024	(Austria) Oracle Red Bull Racing	RB20	Honda RBPTH002 1.6 V6 t	P	1. 11.	(Netherlands) **Max Verstappen** (Mexico) Sergio Pérez	589	3rd
2025	(Austria) Oracle Red Bull Racing	RB21	Honda RBPTH003 1.6 V6 t	P	1. 22. 30.	(Netherlands) Max Verstappen (Japan) Yuki Tsunoda (New Zealand) Liam Lawson	451	3rd
2026	(Austria) Oracle Red Bull Racing	RB22	Red Bull Ford DM01 1.6 V6 t	P	3. 6. 30.	(Netherlands) Max Verstappen (France) Isack Hadjar (New Zealand) Liam Lawson	415*	3rd*

* Season still in progress.

=== Drivers' Champions ===
The following drivers won the Formula One Drivers' Championship for Red Bull:

- (Germany) Sebastian Vettel (2010, 2011, 2012, 2013)
- (Netherlands) Max Verstappen (2021, 2022, 2023, 2024)

=== Esports ===
Year	Name	No.	Drivers	Points	WCC
2018	(Austria) Red Bull Racing Esports	51. 34. N.A.	(Finland) Joni Törmälä (United Kingdom) Graham Carroll; N.A.	81	6th
2019	(Austria) Red Bull Racing Esports	19. 51. 40.	(Denmark) Frederik Rasmussen (Finland) Joni Törmälä (France) Nicolas Longuet	**246**	**1st**
2020	(Austria) Red Bull Racing Esports	19. 24. N.A.	(Denmark) Frederik Rasmussen (Germany) Marcel Kiefer (Finland) Tino Naukkarinen	**331**	**1st**
2021	(Austria) Red Bull Racing Esports	19. 24. N.A.	(Denmark) Frederik Rasmussen (Germany) Marcel Kiefer (Germany) Liam Parnell	258	2nd
2022	(Austria) Red Bull Racing Esports	19. 42. N.A.	(Denmark) Frederik Rasmussen (Germany) Marcel Kiefer (Germany) Liam Parnell	208	2nd
2023-24	(Austria) Oracle Red Bull Racing Sim Racing	52. 19. 13.	(United Kingdom) Josh Idowu (Denmark) Frederik Rasmussen (United Kingdom) Sebastian Job	209	3rd
2025	(Austria) Oracle Red Bull Racing Sim Racing	19. 5. N.A.	(Denmark) Frederik Rasmussen (Netherlands) Jarno Opmeer (United Kingdom) Sebastian Job	244	1st
2026	(Austria) Oracle Red Bull Racing Sim Racing	13. 67. 89	(United Kingdom) Sebastian Job (Denmark) Frederik Rasmussen (Netherlands) Jarno Opmeer	227	1st

==== Esports Drivers' Champions ====
The following drivers won the Formula One Esports Drivers' Championship for Red Bull Racing Esports:

- (Denmark) Frederik Rasmussen (2023–24).
- (Netherlands) Jarno Opmeer (2025).

=== Complete F1 Esports Series results ===
(key (results in bold indicate pole position; results in italics indicate fastest lap))

Year	Chassis	Drivers	1	2	3	4	5	6	7	8	9	10	11	12	Points	WCC
2018	Red Bull RB14		AUS	CHN	AZE	FRA	GBR	BEL	GER	SIN	USA	ABU			81	6th
2018	Red Bull RB14	(Finland) Joni Törmälä	3	12	10	9	9	2	3	14	10	14			81	6th
2018	Red Bull RB14	(United Kingdom) Graham Carroll	4	8	12	11	8	10	17	7	13	11			81	6th
2018	Red Bull RB14	N.A.													81	6th
2019	Red Bull RB15		BHR	CHN	AZE	CAN	RBR	GBR	GER	BEL	ITA	JPN	USA	BRA	246	1st
2019	Red Bull RB15	(Denmark) Frederik Rasmussen	**12**	2	**1**	4	2	2	5	2	19	1	**1**	10	246	1st
2019	Red Bull RB15	(Finland) Joni Törmälä	13	10	16	5	20	7	2	6		8	9	5	246	1st
2019	Red Bull RB15	(France) Nicolas Longuet									2				246	1st
2020	Red Bull RB16		BHR	VIE	CHN	NED	CAN	RBR	GBR	BEL	ITA	JPN	MEX	BRA	331	1st
2020	Red Bull RB16	(Denmark) Frederik Rasmussen	6	5	5	**1**	2	2	**6**	**1**	4	**1**	**3**	11	331	1st
2020	Red Bull RB16	(Germany) Marcel Kiefer	3	6	2	3	3	1	7	3	8	5	6	2	331	1st
2020	Red Bull RB16	(Finland) Tino Naukkarinen													331	1st
2021	Red Bull RB16B		BHR	CHN	RBR	GBR	ITA	BEL	POR	NED	USA	EMI	MEX	BRA	258	2nd
2021	Red Bull RB16B	(Denmark) Frederik Rasmussen	2	17	2	**1**	8	1	2	2	2	3	**3**	1	258	2nd
2021	Red Bull RB16B	(Germany) Marcel Kiefer	8	3	16	7	1	4	9	10	9	20	8	14	258	2nd
2021	Red Bull RB16B	(Germany) Liam Parnell													258	2nd
2022	Red Bull RB18		BHR	EMI	GBR	RBR	BEL	NED	ITA	MEX	USA	JPN	BRA	UAE	208	2nd
2022	Red Bull RB18	(Denmark) Frederik Rasmussen	8	3	**1**	**2**	**2**	3	5	**12**	5	3	2	1	208	2nd
2022	Red Bull RB18	(Germany) Marcel Kiefer	13	2	14	9	14	11	16	4	9	10	11	20	208	2nd
2022	Red Bull RB18	(Germany) Liam Parnell													208	2nd
2023–24	Red Bull RB19		BHR	JED	RBR	GBR	BEL	NED	USA	MEX	BRA	LVG	QAT	UAE	209	3rd
2023–24	Red Bull RB19	(United Kingdom) Josh Idowu	10	9	9	9	4	5	7	9	17	11	15	15	209	3rd
2023–24	Red Bull RB19	(Denmark) Frederik Rasmussen	4	**1**	7	7	3	1	1	3	4	6	5	4	209	3rd
2023–24	Red Bull RB19	(United Kingdom) Sebastian Job													209	3rd
2025	Red Bull RB20		AUS	CHN	BHR	SAU	GBR	BEL	NED	USA	MXC	SAP	QAT	ABU	244	1st
2025	Red Bull RB20	(Denmark) Frederik Rasmussen	10	15	18	Ret	**1**	7	8	4	4	2	6	9	244	1st
2025	Red Bull RB20	(Netherlands) Jarno Opmeer	4	1	12	2	9	6	7	3	1	1	5	7	244	1st
2025	Red Bull RB20	(United Kingdom) Sebastian Job													244	1st
2026	Red Bull RB22		CHN	JPN	BHR	SAU	CAT	GBR	BEL	NED	USA	MXC	SAP	ABU	227	1st
2026	Red Bull RB22	(United Kingdom) Sebastian Job													227	1st
2026	Red Bull RB22	(Denmark) Frederik Rasmussen	**1**	**15**	7	14	3	3	3	2	8	10	6	**17**	227	1st
2026	Red Bull RB22	(Netherlands) Jarno Opmeer	4	10	1	1	6	9	9	10	16	5	5	3	227	1st

* Season still in progress

== See also ==
- List of Formula One constructors
- List of Formula One constructor records

Achievements
Preceded by Brawn GP	Formula One Constructors' Champion; 2010–2011–2012–2013	Succeeded by Mercedes
Preceded by Mercedes	Formula One Constructors' Champion; 2022–2023	Succeeded by McLaren
