= 2023–24 F1 Sim Racing World Championship =

Racing eSports Series

Tournament information
- Sport: F1 Sim Racing
- Location: Qualification: Worldwide; Pro Draft: Online; Pro Series: LAN
- Dates: 25 November 2023–9 May 2024
- Administrator: Codemasters; EA Sports; Formula One Management
- Tournament format(s): Qualification: Online; Pro Exhibition: Driver's selection Pro Championship: Twelve race championship
- Venue: Qualification: Worldwide; Pro Exhibition: N/A; Pro Championship: Event 1 – DreamHack Winter; Event 2–3 - Stockholm, Sweden

Final positions
- Champions: (Denmark) Frederik Rasmussen (Italy) Scuderia Ferrari Esports

The 2023–24 Formula One Sim Racing World Championship was an esports competition for Formula One which is the seventh season of the Formula One Esports Series and the first in the series to be named as the "Formula One Sim Racing Championship." It was held on Formula One's official 2023 game, featuring all ten teams from the real-life sport.

After being runner-up in the standings for four prior seasons in a row, Frederik Rasmussen of Oracle Red Bull Sim Racing won the Driver's Championship for the first time in his career after a long battle with Thomas Ronhaar and Bari Broumand, the latter of whom helped his team Scuderia Ferrari Esports win the Constructor's Championship for the first time. Lucas Blakeley and McLaren Shadow were the defending champions, but scored no wins at all and dropped to the midfield.

The championship has been subject to significant backlash by both drivers and fans. The first issue was on the eve of Event One, which, despite being planned to host two races, only managed to host one due to complications surrounding legal contracts relating to the prize money for the series. Soon after Event One, it was leaked that Event Two, which was set to be hosted at DreamHack Atlanta, had been cancelled. Following this, the series sat in limbo until a set calendar was revealed on 2 April 2024, with the rest of the races starting on 10 April 2024 and ending on 9 May 2024.

== Format ==
- Pro Championship

The drivers will race in a series of 3 LAN events that are broadcast live. Same as F1, drivers must make one pit stop if the weather is dry, and are not obligated to do so if it's wet. They earn points for themselves and their teams. These points will determine the F1 Sim Racing World Championship Teams’ and Drivers’ World Champions, with a total $750,000 prize fund.

== Teams and drivers ==
Team	Race drivers		
Team	No.	Driver name	Rounds
(France) Alpine Esports	93; 38; 80	(Spain) Rubén Pedreño (Slovakia) Filip Prešnajder (Hungary) Patrik Sipos	1–3, 6–12; 2–5; 1, 4–12
(United Kingdom) Aston Martin Aramco Esports Team	8; 30; 32	(Chile) Fabrizio Donoso (Germany) Simon Weigang (United Kingdom) John Evans	1–2, 6–12; 1–5, 9–11; 3–8, 12
(Switzerland) KICK F1 Sim Racing Team (Note: Sauber, the managing group of Kick F1, entered Round 1 as Alfa Romeo F1 Team KICK Esports, but switched to "KICK F1 Sim Racing Team" following Alfa Romeo's departure from Formula One in 2024.)	39; 72; N.A.	(Netherlands) Thomas Ronhaar (United Kingdom) Brendon Leigh (Netherlands) Xander van Dijken	All; All; Did not compete
(United Kingdom) McLaren Shadow	12; 88; 26	(United Kingdom) Wilson Hughes (United Kingdom) Lucas Blakeley (Spain) Dani Moreno	1–5, 8–9, 12; All; 6–7, 10–11
(Germany) Mercedes-AMG Petronas Esports Team	15; 5; 25	(Hungary) Daniel Bereznay (Netherlands) Jarno Opmeer (United Kingdom) Jake Benham	1, 4–5, 8–9, 12; All; 2–3, 6–7, 10–11
(United States) MoneyGram Haas F1 Team Esports	95; 41; 37	(Turkey) Ulaş Özyıldrım (United Kingdom) Alfie Butcher (Hungary) Bence Szabó-Kónyi	All; All; Did not compete
(Austria) Oracle Red Bull Sim Racing	52; 19; 13	(United Kingdom) Josh Idowu (Denmark) Frederik Rasmussen (United Kingdom) Sebastian Job	All; All; Did not compete
(Italy) Scuderia AlphaTauri Orlen Esports Team	6; 79; 51	(United Kingdom) Tom Manley (United Kingdom) Jed Norgrove (Finland) Joni Törmälä	1, 4–8, 10–12; 1–5, 8–10, 12; 2–3, 6–7, 9, 11
(Italy) Scuderia Ferrari Esports	7; 40; 62	(Iran) Bari Broumand (France) Nicolas Longuet (Hungary) István Puki	All; All; Did not compete
(United Kingdom) Williams Esports	9; 73; 54	(Spain) Álvaro Carretón (United Kingdom) Will Lewis (Spain) Ismael Fahssi	1–3, 6–12; 4–5; All

== Calendar ==
After the first round was held in November, a full schedule was announced in late March.

As per the official F1 Sim Racing Championship 2023-24 rulebook, the championship took place over three "race weeks;" all rounds were broken down into five events with each event consisting of two to three races.

Round	Circuit	Distance	Date	Broadcast	Event	Event Winner
1	Bahrain International Circuit, Sakhir	29 laps	25 November 2023	F1 Sim Racing Bahrain Grand Prix 2023 Round 1 on YouTube	Race week 1 - Jönköping, Sweden DreamHack Winter 2023 Championship Event 1	(Netherlands) Thomas Ronhaar
2	(Saudi Arabia) Jeddah Corniche Circuit, Jeddah	25 laps	10 April 2024	F1 Sim Racing World Championship 2023/2024 Round 2 and 3 on YouTube	Race week 2 - Stockholm, Sweden Championship Event 2	(Netherlands) Thomas Ronhaar
3	(Austria) Red Bull Ring, Spielberg	36 laps	10 April 2024	F1 Sim Racing World Championship 2023/2024 Round 2 and 3 on YouTube	Race week 2 - Stockholm, Sweden Championship Event 2	(Spain) Ismael Fahssi
4	(United Kingdom) Silverstone Circuit, Silverstone	26 laps	11 April 2024	F1 Sim Racing World Championship 2023/2024 Round 4 and 5 on YouTube	Race week 2 - Stockholm, Sweden Championship Event 2	(Spain) Ismael Fahssi
5	(Belgium) Circuit de Spa-Francorchamps, Stavelot	22 Laps	11 April 2024	F1 Sim Racing World Championship 2023/2024 Round 4 and 5 on YouTube	Race week 2 - Stockholm, Sweden Championship Event 2	(Denmark) Frederik Rasmussen
6	(Netherlands) Circuit Zandvoort, Zandvoort	36 Laps	12 April 2024	F1 Sim Racing World Championship 2023/2024 Round 6 and 7 on YouTube	Race week 2 - Stockholm, Sweden Championship Event 2	(Denmark) Frederik Rasmussen
7	(United States) Circuit of the Americas, Austin, Texas	28 laps	12 April 2024	F1 Sim Racing World Championship 2023/2024 Round 6 and 7 on YouTube	Race week 2 - Stockholm, Sweden Championship Event 2	(Denmark) Frederik Rasmussen
8	Autódromo Hermanos Rodríguez, Mexico City	36 laps	7 May 2024	F1 Sim Racing World Championship 2023/2024 Round 8 and 9 on YouTube	Race week 3 - Stockholm, Sweden Championship Event 3	(Netherlands) Thomas Ronhaar
9	(Brazil) Interlagos Circuit, São Paulo	36 laps	7 May 2024	F1 Sim Racing World Championship 2023/2024 Round 8 and 9 on YouTube	Race week 3 - Stockholm, Sweden Championship Event 3	(Netherlands) Thomas Ronhaar
10	(United States) Las Vegas Strip Circuit, Paradise, Nevada	25 laps	8 May 2024	F1 Sim Racing World Championship 2023/2024 Round 10 and 11 on YouTube	Race week 3 - Stockholm, Sweden Championship Event 3	(Iran) Bari Broumand
11	(Qatar) Losail International Circuit, Lusail	29 laps	8 May 2024	F1 Sim Racing World Championship 2023/2024 Round 10 and 11 on YouTube	Race week 3 - Stockholm, Sweden Championship Event 3	(Iran) Bari Broumand
12	(United Arab Emirates) Yas Marina Circuit, Abu Dhabi	29 laps	9 May 2024	F1 Sim Racing World Championship 2023/2024 Round 12 on YouTube	Race week 3 - Stockholm, Sweden Championship Event 3	(Iran) Bari Broumand

=== Calendar Changes ===
The Jeddah Corniche Circuit replaced the Autodromo Enzo e Dino Ferrari, making its debut on the calendar. The Autodromo Nazionale di Monza and Suzuka International Racing Course were also absent, being replaced by the Las Vegas Strip Circuit and the Lusail International Circuit respectively.

== Season report ==
=== Event One: DreamHack Winter 2023 ===
Round 1 was held during DreamHack Winter 2023, held in Jönköping, Sweden. It was the first F1 Sim Racing LAN event since 2019.

At the opening round in Bahrain, Kick F1's Thomas Ronhaar took pole position and led from the start, dominating the race. Nicolas Longuet was involved in a collision at turn 1 on lap 6, clashing with reigning champion Lucas Blakeley and rookie Alfie Butcher. Longuet managed to recover following a wing change to finish 3rd, while Blakeley was left dropping down the field on worn softs. Two-time champion Jarno Opmeer made his way through the field to P2, including making a double overtake, to finish 6 seconds behind winner Ronhaar from P9 on the grid. Ronhaar’s teammate, two-time champion Brendon Leigh, struggled with issues on his racing simulator, finishing down in twelfth after starting 14th. Jed Norgrove finished seventh on debut for AlphaTauri after starting P8. Ronhaar received a $5,000 prize for winning the event.

=== Event Two ===
After nearly five months, the season resumed at Jeddah with Frederik Rasmussen taking pole position. Rookie Butcher qualified an impressive third place, but shunted into Ferrari's Bari Broumand during their pitstops, giving him damage and forcing him into retirement. Ronhaar battled with Williams rookie Ismael Fahssi and Blakeley for the podium positions, and in the end Rasmussen took his thirteenth career victory from Ronhaar, Fahssi, and Blakeley.

Ronhaar took pole position in Austria and spent the first third of the race battling with Broumand for the lead. Blakeley disconnected from the race, meaning a Virtual Safety Car was called for a lap to allow Blakeley to rejoin the server. The incident affected several strategies and, after the round of pitstops, led to Butcher taking the lead from twelfth on the grid after teammate Ulaş Özyıldrım backed up the pack to form a clear gap for him. This allowed Butcher to take his maiden race win with Ronhaar second and Fahssi third. Rasmussen could only manage eighth, and Opmeer withdrew from the race after receiving a ten-second penalty in game for speeding under the VSC.

Opmeer received a grid penalty for the race at Silverstone for withdrawing from the Austrian Grand Prix without proper reason and exiting his simulator rig mid-race without permission. This meant that despite Opmeer setting the fastest lap time in qualifying, his Mercedes teammate Daniel Bereznay started on pole position. Opmeer responded by going on a longer strategy during the race, getting a set of six-lap younger tires than the rest of the frontrunners with twelve laps to go. He charged through the field and took his only win of the season ahead of Longuet, Bereznay, and Fahssi. Championship leader Ronhaar could only manage eighth.

Ronhaar's luck worsened during the Belgian Grand Prix, only finishing tenth. Pole-sitter Broumand battled with Blakeley on the final lap, eventually winning ahead of Blakeley in second with Rasmussen third and Idowu fourth, while Opmeer finished fifth with the fastest lap. Ronhaar's lead in the championship decreased to three points ahead of Rasmussen and seven points to Opmeer.

Longuet took pole at the Dutch Grand Prix, but as an originally wet track dried, he pitted for the mediums when the game bugged and gave him the wrong set of tires; he pitted again for the right set, dropping down to last. Rasmussen inherited the lead to take a comfortable victory, and with it not only became the first repeat winner of the season but also surpassed eleventh-placed Ronhaar for the championship lead.

Blakeley took pole at the United States Grand Prix, but lost out at the start to Broumand, Rasumssen and Alvaro Carreton at the start. His strategy didn't help him progress, leaving him stuck at fourth. Rasmussen tussled with Broumand to win ahead of him and Leigh, ensuring he would lead the championship for the next two rounds. Alpine scored their first points in the championship, with its drivers Patrik Sipos and Ruben Pedreno finishing seventh and eighth respectively. Rasmussen left Event Two with a 41-point lead over Broumand, with Opmeer a further point back and Ronhaar a further five. Red Bull Racing led the Constructor’s Championship by twenty points over Mercedes, thirty over Ferrari, and fifty over Kick.

=== Event Three ===
Broumand took pole for the Mexico City Grand Prix, and subsequently battled with Ronhaar and Rasmussen throughout the race. Leigh went wide at turn 11 midway and crashed out, marking the only damage-based retirement of the season. Ronhaar won the race, breaking Opmeer's three-win streak at Mexico City. Broumand, Rasmussen, and Butcher followed behind, while Pedreño got his best result of the season in fifth.

Ronhaar took pole for the Brazilian Grand Prix, while Broumand was forced to start in sixteenth following a rain-affected qualifying. After a lobby restart on the first lap, Blakeley and Simon Weigang battled with Ronhaar and Rasmussen for the lead, while Opmeer began a recovery stint from fourteenth. Rasmussen's strategy failed and put him sixth at the end, while Ronhaar won a second time in a row to put him twenty-two points behind Rasmussen. Carreton originally finished second, but received a post-race penalty and dropped out of the points. Butcher inherited second and Opmeer inherited third, while Ferrari left Brazil with no points; Longuet lost fourth due to a penalty, and Broumand retired late race due to a spin.

Ferrari redeemed themselves in the Las Vegas Grand Prix; Longuet took pole position for the race, and Broumand headed a 1-2 from Longuet in a battle-filled race. Opmeer and Ronhaar followed behind, while Rasmussen finished sixth and Blakeley crashed on the finish line in ninth. Ronhaar reduced his gap to Rasmussen down to eighteen points, meaning only he, Broumand, and Opmeer could challenge Rasmussen for the title.

Broumand took pole the same day for the Qatar Grand Prix, while Rasmussen suffered an exit in the second qualifying session. After the latter and teammate Josh Idowu made their pitstops, Idowu backed up the likes of Pedreno, Opmeer, and Leigh to give Rasmussen more leniency in overtaking them. Broumand headed another 1-2 finish, eliminating Opmeer from the championship fight. Broumand had a three-point gap to third-placed Ronhaar, and a further thirteen points to fifth-placed Rasmussen. Ferrari's maximized results put them forty points ahead of Red Bull in the Team's Championship.

Ronhaar took pole for the season-ending Abu Dhabi Grand Prix, with Broumand joining him on the front row ahead of Longuet, while Rasmussen only achieved seventh. Just like he did in Qatar, Idowu held up several cars to give Rasmussen a benefit, which left him, Butcher and Bereznay behind but on fresher tires than Ronhaar and the two Ferraris in the second stint. Butcher battled all of the top five, jumbling up the order and shoving Broumand down to seventh. In the end, Butcher won the race and ended the season as the highest-placed rookie in the drivers' standings. Ronhaar finished the race in second with Bereznay third. Finishing in fourth place, Frederik Rasmussen secured his place as the F1 Sim Racing World Champion after being the runner-up four times previously. Ferrari won the Constructors' Championship, while Kick achieved second by out-scoring Red Bull in the final round, with Red Bull ending up third and Mercedes fourth. Ronhaar was runner-up in the drivers' championship with Broumand third, Opmeer fourth, Butcher fifth, Longuet sixth and 2022 champion Blakeley only seventh.

== Results ==
=== Season summary ===
Round	Circuit	Pole position	Fastest lap	Winning driver	Winning team
1	Bahrain International Circuit, Sakhir	(Netherlands) Thomas Ronhaar	(United Kingdom) Wilson Hughes (Note: Wilson Hughes set the fastest lap but did not finish in the top 10, so was ineligible to score the point for it. Bari Broumand scored the point for setting the fastest lap of those finishing in the top 10.)	(Netherlands) Thomas Ronhaar	(Switzerland) Alfa Romeo F1 Team Kick Esports
2	(Saudi Arabia) Jeddah Corniche Circuit, Jeddah	(Denmark) Frederik Rasmussen	(United Kingdom) Jake Benham	(Denmark) Frederik Rasmussen	(Austria) Oracle Red Bull Sim Racing
3	(Austria) Red Bull Ring, Spielberg	(Netherlands) Thomas Ronhaar	(Finland) Joni Törmälä (Note: Joni Törmälä set the fastest lap but did not finish in the top 10, so was ineligible to score the point for it. Jed Norgrove scored the point for setting the fastest lap of those finishing in the top 10.)	(United Kingdom) Alfie Butcher	(United States) MoneyGram Haas F1 Team Esports
4	(United Kingdom) Silverstone Circuit, Silverstone	(Hungary) Daniel Bereznay (Note: Jarno Opmeer set the fastest time in qualifying, but he received a three-place grid penalty. Daniel Bereznay was promoted to pole position in his place.)	(Netherlands) Jarno Opmeer	(Netherlands) Jarno Opmeer	(Germany) Mercedes-AMG Petronas Esports Team
5	(Belgium) Circuit de Spa-Francorchamps, Stavelot	(Iran) Bari Broumand	(Netherlands) Jarno Opmeer	(Iran) Bari Broumand	(Italy) Scuderia Ferrari Esports
6	(Netherlands) Circuit Zandvoort, Zandvoort	(France) Nicolas Longuet	(Spain) Ismael Fahssi	(Denmark) Frederik Rasmussen	(Austria) Oracle Red Bull Sim Racing
7	(United States) Circuit of the Americas, Austin, Texas	(United Kingdom) Lucas Blakeley	(United Kingdom) Alfie Butcher	(Denmark) Frederik Rasmussen	(Austria) Oracle Red Bull Sim Racing
8	Autódromo Hermanos Rodríguez, Mexico City	(Iran) Bari Broumand	(Netherlands) Thomas Ronhaar	(Netherlands) Thomas Ronhaar	(Switzerland) KICK F1 Sim Racing Team
9	(Brazil) Interlagos Circuit, São Paulo	(Netherlands) Thomas Ronhaar	(Netherlands) Jarno Opmeer	(Netherlands) Thomas Ronhaar	(Switzerland) KICK F1 Sim Racing Team
10	(United States) Las Vegas Strip Circuit, Paradise, Nevada	(France) Nicolas Longuet	(United Kingdom) Brendon Leigh	(Iran) Bari Broumand	(Italy) Scuderia Ferrari Esports
11	(Qatar) Lusail International Circuit, Lusail	(Iran) Bari Broumand	(Spain) Rubén Pedreño	(Iran) Bari Broumand	(Italy) Scuderia Ferrari Esports
12	(United Arab Emirates) Yas Marina Circuit, Abu Dhabi	(Netherlands) Thomas Ronhaar	(Chile) Fabrizio Donoso	(United Kingdom) Alfie Butcher	(United States) MoneyGram Haas F1 Team Esports

== Championship standings ==
=== Scoring system ===
Points will be awarded to the top 10 classified finishers in the race and one point will be given to the driver who sets the fastest lap inside the top ten. Starting from this season, one extra point will be awarded to the pole-sitter.

Position	1st	2nd	3rd	4th	5th	6th	7th	8th	9th	10th	Pole	FL
Points	25	18	15	12	10	8	6	4	2	1	1	1

In the event of a tie at the conclusion of the championship, a count-back system is used as a tie-breaker, with a driver's/team's best result used to decide the standings.

=== Drivers' Championship standings ===
Pos.	Driver	BHR (Bahrain)	SAU (Saudi Arabia)	AUT (Austria)	GBR (United Kingdom)	BEL (Belgium)	NED (Netherlands)	USA (United States)	MXC (Mexico)	SAP (Brazil)	LVG (United States)	QAT (Qatar)	ABU (United Arab Emirates)	Points
1	(Denmark) Frederik Rasmussen	4	1^{P}	7	7	3	1	1	3	4	6	5	4	172
2	(Netherlands) Thomas Ronhaar	1^{P}	2	2^{P}	8	10	11	19	1^{F}	1^{P}	4	3	2^{P}	166
3	(Iran) Bari Broumand	5^{F}	17	10	11	1^{P}	2	2	2^{P}	Ret	1	1^{P}	7	150
4	(Netherlands) Jarno Opmeer	2	7	Ret	1^{F}	5^{F}	7	8	8	3^{F}	3	6	6	122
5	(United Kingdom) Alfie Butcher	9	Ret	1	18	Ret	4	5^{F}	4	2	10	12	1	106
6	(France) Nicolas Longuet	3	8	6	2	13	20^{P}	18	5	13	2^{P}	2	5	103
7	(United Kingdom) Lucas Blakeley	17	4	14	6	2	6	4^{P}	13	6	9	18	16	69
8	(Spain) Ismael Fahssi	8	3	3	4	8	9^{F}	20	Ret	11	12	14	Ret	53
9	(Hungary) Daniel Bereznay	6			3^{P}	6			12	10			3	48
10	(United Kingdom) Brendon Leigh	12	16	12	5	7	10	3	Ret	7	7^{F}	16	9	47
11	(United Kingdom) Josh Idowu	10	9	9	9	4	5	7	9	17	11	15	15	37
12	(Spain) Álvaro Carretón	18	18	11			12	6	6	15	8	8	8	28
13	(United Kingdom) Jake Benham		5^{F}	4			8	13			19	17		27
14	(United Kingdom) Tom Manley	16			13	9	3	12	7		Ret	Ret	Ret	23
15	(United Kingdom) Jed Norgrove	7	12	5^{F}	14	14			16	16	17		11	17
16	(Germany) Simon Weigang	13	13	19	10	15				8	18	4		17
17	(United Kingdom) Wilson Hughes	19^{F}	6	8	20	11			14	14			12	12
18	(Finland) Joni Törmälä		19	18			14	16		5		10		11
19	(Turkey) Ulaş Özyıldrım	14	11	13	17	16	19	11	17	12	5	11	17	10
20	(Spain) Rubén Pedreño	11	15	16			17	10	10	Ret	15	7^{F}	Ret	9
21	(Chile) Fabrizio Donoso	20	10				18	14	18	9	16	19	10^{F}	5
22	(Hungary) Patrik Sipos	15			12	17	16	9	11	18	14	13	13	2
23	(Spain) Dani Moreno						13	15			13	9		2
24	(United Kingdom) John Evans			17	19	12	15	17	15				14	0
25	(Slovakia) Filip Prešnajder		14	15	15	18								0
26	(United Kingdom) Will Lewis				16	Ret								0
Pos.	Driver	BHR (Bahrain)	SAU (Saudi Arabia)	AUT (Austria)	GBR (United Kingdom)	BEL (Belgium)	NED (Netherlands)	USA (United States)	MXC (Mexico)	SAP (Brazil)	LVG (United States)	QAT (Qatar)	ABU (United Arab Emirates)	Points

Key
Colour	Result
Gold	Winner
Silver	Second place
Bronze	Third place
Green	Other points position
Blue	Other classified position
Blue	Not classified, finished (NC)
Purple	Not classified, retired (Ret)
Red	Did not qualify (DNQ)
Red	Did not pre-qualify (DNPQ)
Black	Disqualified (DSQ)
White	Did not start (DNS)
White	Race cancelled (C)
Blank	Did not enter
Annotation	Meaning
P	Pole position
F	Fastest lap

=== Teams' Championship standings ===
Pos.	Team	BHR (Bahrain)	SAU (Saudi Arabia)	AUT (Austria)	GBR (United Kingdom)	BEL (Belgium)	NED (Netherlands)	USA (United States)	MXC (Mexico)	SAP (Brazil)	LVG (United States)	QAT (Qatar)	ABU (United Arab Emirates)	Points
1	(Italy) Scuderia Ferrari Esports	3	8	6	2	1^{P}	2	2	2^{P}	13	1	1^{P}	5	253
1	(Italy) Scuderia Ferrari Esports	5^{F}	17	10	11	13	20^{P}	18	7	Ret	2^{P}	2	7	253
2	(Switzerland) KICK F1 Sim Racing Team	1^{P}	2	2^{P}	5	7	10	3	1	1^{P}	4	3	2^{P}	213
2	(Switzerland) KICK F1 Sim Racing Team	12	16	12	8	10	11	19	Ret	7	7^{P}	16	9	213
3	(Austria) Oracle Red Bull Sim Racing	4	1^{P}	7	7	3	1	1	3	4	6	5	4	209
3	(Austria) Oracle Red Bull Sim Racing	10	9	9	9	4	5	7	11	17	11	15	15	209
4	(Germany) Mercedes-AMG Petronas Esports Team	2	5^{F}	4	1^{F}	5^{F}	7	8	9	3^{F}	3	6	3	197
4	(Germany) Mercedes-AMG Petronas Esports Team	6	7	Ret	3^{P}	6	8	13	10	10	19	17	6	197
5	(United States) MoneyGram Haas F1 Team Esports	9	11	1	17	16	4	5^{F}	4	2	5	11	1	116
5	(United States) MoneyGram Haas F1 Team Esports	14	Ret	13	18	Ret	19	11	17	12	10	12	16	116
6	(United Kingdom) McLaren Shadow	17	4	8	6	2	6	4^{P}	13	6	9	9	12	83
6	(United Kingdom) McLaren Shadow	19	6	14	20	11	13	15	14	16	13	18	17	83
7	(United Kingdom) Williams Esports	8	3	3	4	8	9^{F}	6	7	11	8	8	8	81
7	(United Kingdom) Williams Esports	18	18	11	16	Ret	12	20	Ret	15	12	14	Ret	81
8	(Italy) Scuderia AlphaTauri Orlen Esports Team	7	12	5^{F}	13	9	3	12	8	5	17	10	11	51
8	(Italy) Scuderia AlphaTauri Orlen Esports Team	16	19	18	14	14	14	16	16	16	Ret	Ret	Ret	51
9	(United Kingdom) Aston Martin Aramco Esports Team	13	10	17	10	11	15	14	16	8	16	4	10^{F}	22
9	(United Kingdom) Aston Martin Aramco Esports Team	20	13	19	19	15	18	17	18	9	18	19	14	22
10	(France) Alpine Esports	11	14	15	12	17	16	9	10	18	14	7^{F}	13	11
10	(France) Alpine Esports	15	15	16	15	18	17	10	12	Ret	15	13	Ret	11
Pos.	Team	BHR (Bahrain)	SAU (Saudi Arabia)	AUT (Austria)	GBR (United Kingdom)	BEL (Belgium)	NED (Netherlands)	USA (United States)	MXC (Mexico)	SAP (Brazil)	LVG (United States)	QAT (Qatar)	ABU (United Arab Emirates)	Points

Notes:

- The standings are sorted by best result, rows are not related to the drivers. In case of tie on points, the best positions achieved determined the outcome.
