= 2022 Formula One Esports Series =

Racing eSports Series

Tournament information
- Sport: Formula One Esports Series
- Location: Qualification: Worldwide; Pro Draft: Online; Pro Series: TBA
- Dates: 14 September 2022–16 December 2022
- Administrator: Codemasters; EA Sports; Formula One Management
- Tournament format(s): Qualification: Online; Pro Exhibition: Driver's selection Pro Championship: Twelve race championship
- Venue: Qualification: Worldwide; Pro Exhibition: Silverstone; Pro Championship: Online

Final positions
- Champions: (United Kingdom) Lucas Blakeley (United Kingdom) McLaren Shadow

The 2022 F1 Esports Series Pro Championship was an esports competition for Formula One which was the sixth season of the Formula One Esports Series and the last installation to be named the "F1 Esports Series" before rebranding to F1 Sim Racing the next season. It was held in Formula One's official 2022 game.

Lucas Blakeley won the driver's championship for the first time, as McLaren Shadow won the team's championship for the first time. Jarno Opmeer and Mercedes-AMG Petronas Esports Team were the defending champions, having won the Drivers' and Teams' titles respectively in 2021. It was the final season for 2019 champion David Tonizza and long-time driver Marcel Kiefer; Tonizza moved to other esports competitions and Kiefer retired from esports to pursue a motorsport career.

== Format ==
- Qualification - The season opens with online qualification, a global call for participation. Qualification is open to anyone with a copy of the official Formula 1 video game developed by Codemasters. The fastest gamers get through.
- Pro Exhibition - Qualifying gamers enter the Pro Draft where the official Formula 1 teams select their drivers to represent them in the F1 Esports Series Pro Championship.
- Pro Championship - The drivers race in a series of events that are broadcast live. Race distance was increased from 35% to 50% this year. Same as F1, drivers must make one pit stop if the weather is dry, and are not obligated to do so if it's wet. They earn points for themselves and their F1 teams. These races will determine the F1 Esports Series Pro Championship Teams’ and Drivers’ World Champions, with a portion of the prize fund distributed to the teams based on their standings.

== Teams and drivers ==
Team	Race drivers		
Team	No.	Driver name	Rounds
(Switzerland) Alfa Romeo Racing ORLEN F1 Esports Team	15; 40; 71	(Hungary) Daniel Bereznay (France) Nicolas Longuet (Poland) Tomasz Poradzisz	1, 3–5, 7, 9–11; All; 2, 6, 8, 12
(France) Alpine Esports Team	80; 38; 75	(Hungary) Patrik Sipos (Slovakia) Filip Prešnajder (United Kingdom) Luke Smith	1–7, 9–12; 1–2, 4–5, 7–8; 3, 6, 8–12
(United Kingdom) Aston Martin Cognizant Esports Team	69; 30; 2	(Italy) Manuel Biancolilla (Germany) Simon Weigang (United Kingdom) John Evans	1–3, 9–10; All; 4–8, 11–12
(Italy) Scuderia Ferrari Velas Esports Team	72; 95; 8	(United Kingdom) Brendon Leigh (Italy) David Tonizza (Chile) Fabrizio Donoso	1–4, 6–12; 2, 4–5, 7–8, 12; 1, 3, 5–6, 9–11
(United Kingdom) McLaren Shadow	88; 7; 13	(United Kingdom) Lucas Blakeley (Iran) Bari Broumand (United Kingdom) Wilson Hughes	All; All; Did not compete
(Germany) Mercedes-AMG Petronas Esports Team	34; 26; 25	(Netherlands) Jarno Opmeer (Spain) Dani Moreno (United Kingdom) Jake Benham	All; 1–6; 7–12
(Austria) Red Bull Racing Esports	19; 42; N.A.	(Denmark) Frederik Rasmussen (Germany) Marcel Kiefer (Germany) Liam Parnell	All; All; Did not compete
(Italy) Scuderia AlphaTauri Esports Team	10; 67; 51	(United Kingdom) Sebastian Job (United Kingdom) Josh Idowu (Finland) Joni Törmälä	1, 3, 5–7, 9–11; 1–2, 4–5, 7–8, 11–12; 2–4, 6, 8–10, 12
(United States) Haas F1 Team Esports	48; 39; 84	(Netherlands) Matthijs van Erven (Netherlands) Thomas Ronhaar (Poland) Piotr Stachulec	2, 4–5, 7, 10; All; 1, 3, 6, 8–9, 11–12
(United Kingdom) Williams Esports	21; 92; 79	(Spain) Álvaro Carretón (Italy) Daniele Haddad (United Kingdom) Shanaka Clay	1–4, 6, 9–12; 2, 5–10, 12; 1, 3–5, 7–8, 11

== Calendar ==
Round	Event	Circuit	Distance	Date	Broadcast
1	Event One	Bahrain International Circuit, Sakhir	29 Laps	14 September	2022 F1 Esports Series Pro Championship: Round 1 on YouTube
2	Event One	(Italy) Autodromo Internazionale Enzo e Dino Ferrari, Imola	32 Laps	15 September	2022 F1 Esports Series Pro Championship: Round 2 on YouTube
3	Event One	(United Kingdom) Silverstone Circuit, Silverstone	26 Laps	16 September	2022 F1 Esports Series Pro Championship: Round 3 on YouTube
4	Event Two	(Austria) Red Bull Ring, Spielberg	36 Laps	12 October	2022 F1 Esports Series Pro Championship: Round 4 on YouTube
5	Event Two	(Belgium) Circuit de Spa-Francorchamps, Stavelot	22 Laps	13 October	2022 F1 Esports Series Pro Championship: Round 5 on YouTube
6	Event Two	(Netherlands) Circuit Zandvoort, Zandvoort	36 Laps	14 October	2022 F1 Esports Series Pro Championship: Round 6 on YouTube
7	Event Three	(Italy) Autodromo Nazionale di Monza, Monza	27 Laps	2 November	2022 F1 Esports Series Pro Championship: Round 7 on YouTube
8	Event Three	Autódromo Hermanos Rodríguez, Mexico City	36 Laps	3 November	2022 F1 Esports Series Pro Championship: Round 8 on YouTube
9	Event Three	(United States) Circuit of the Americas, Austin, Texas	28 Laps	4 November	2022 F1 Esports Series Pro Championship: Round 9 on YouTube
10	Grand Final	(Japan) Suzuka International Racing Course, Suzuka	27 Laps	14 December	2022 F1 Esports Series Pro Championship: Round 10 on YouTube
11	Grand Final	(Brazil) Autódromo José Carlos Pace, São Paulo	36 Laps	15 December	2022 F1 Esports Series Pro Championship: Round 11 on YouTube
12	Grand Final	(United Arab Emirates) Yas Marina Circuit, Abu Dhabi	29 Laps	16 December	2022 F1 Esports Series Pro Championship: Round 12 on YouTube

== Season report ==
=== Event One ===
The season started off in Bahrain. Lucas Blakeley took pole position and led from the start, but had to fend off the likes of Frederik Rasmussen and rookie Thomas Ronhaar, which caused him to lose ground to the reigning champion, Jarno Opmeer. Opmeer attempted an overcut, while Ronhaar sustained damaged and retired from the race. Blakeley was given a penalty by the game, but it was revoked by the stewards and it allowed him to win ahead of Opmeer and his new teammate, Bari Broumand.

At the next round in Imola, Ronhaar took his first pole position in the series. On the first lap, Opmeer was tagged from the back and fell to eighteenth. A poor strategy from Ronhaar relegated him to fourth place, with Blakeley winning back-to-back races. Marcel Kiefer was second for his only podium of his final season in F1 Esports, with his teammate Rasmussen getting his first podium of the season.

Rasmussen claimed his first pole of the season at Silverstone. Ronhaar settled for a long stint behind him, which eventually led to a last-lap battle between the two. Rasmussen took his first win of the season; Ronhaar took his first podium of the season (and also the first of his career). Blakeley got past Sebastian Job for third.

=== Event Two ===
Rasmussen took another pole position at the Red Bull Ring. He and Ronhaar fought in wet conditions, but eventually, Ronhaar took the lead to win his first race in F1 Esports. Rasmussen ended up second, with Josh Idowu taking his first podium behind. Opmeer was fourth from Nicolas Longuet, Blakeley, and Broumand.

Rasmussen again took pole at the Circuit de Spa-Francorchamps. He battled Broumand throughout the race and fell back during the round of pit stops. Blakeley got pas Broumand, but only briefly as he retook the position; Idowu managed to overtake Blakeley later. Rasmussen’s pace advantage over Broumand resulted in a last-lap battle, but Broumand took the win from Rasmussen, Idowu, and Blakeley.

Ronhaar took pole at Zandvoort, his home race. A rainy starting ground caused Piotr Stachulec, Ronhaar’s teammate, to spin into Dani Moreno, Opmeer’s teammate. By Lap 10, everyone but Opmeer was on medium tires, with Opmeer going for the hard compound. His plan failed as he dropped from second to four. Blakeley won his third race of the season from Broumand, Rasmussen, and Opmeer, as pole-sitter Ronhaar ended up 9th.

=== Event Three ===
Heading into the second half of the season, Blakeley had 110 points compared to Rasmussen’s 95. Broumand was further back with 70 points, with Ronhaar and Opmeer on 63 and 60 points respectively.

Longuet took pole position in Monza, as Opmeer was only eighteenth. At the start, Longuet had a snap of understeer, allowing Broumand to soar into the lead. Ronhaar got past Longuet as well to battle Broumand for the win, which he achieved in another last-lap battle. Longuet ended up in third. Rasmussen was fifth with Blakeley seventh.

Rasmussen took another pole in Mexico City. After the round of pitstops, Rasmussen forced Ronhaar off the road at Turn 6; he eventually got a ten-second time penalty. Opmeer won for the first time since last year on the same track, with Broumand and Ronhaar second and third respectively. Blakeley only managed 7th, and Rasmussen’s penalties sent him to twelfth at the end.

Ronhaar took his fourth pole position in Austin. After wet conditions at the start jumbled up the order, Broumand entered the final lap in the lead from Ronhaar, Opmeer, and Brendon Leigh. At Turn 12, Ronhaar forced Broumand to the outside, which allowed Opmeer and Leigh to join the battle. In the end, Opmeer won from Ronhaar, with Leigh taking his first podium in the series since 2020, and Broumand was only fourth. Rasmussen was fifth and Blakeley ended up in sixth. Opmeer’s win put him only 21 points behind championship leader Blakeley, effectively making it a five-way championship fight between them, Broumand, Ronhaar, and Rasmussen.

=== Grand Final ===
Ronhaar took another pole at Suzuka, but Longuet shot up in the lead at Turn 1. When multiple people pitted, Jake Benham held up everyone for one lap so that his teammate, Opmeer, would benefit from the pitstops. This would eventually fail, as Opmeer crashed into Fabrizio Donoso, putting him out of the race. Longuet eventually won the race from Ronhaar. With Blakeley third and Broumand fourth, McLaren Shadow won the team’s championship for the first time in Esports history.

Blakeley took pole at Interlagos, his first pole since the first round. Mixed conditions during the race led Rasmussen and Broumand to fight for second position, with Rasmussen eventually getting the place only behind winner Blakeley. Ronhaar was only sixth and Opmeer was eighth. Broumand and Opmeer’s poor results meant that they were officially eliminated from the championship fight.

Idowu took his second career pole position at the final round in Yas Island. On the first lap, Ronhaar shot into the lead and kept it for most of the race, but Rasmussen battled him in the latter stages. Rasmussen eventually won the race over Ronhaar, with Idowu behind in third. And with Lucas Blakeley fourth, he became the 2022 F1 Esports Champion, the first of his career and the fourth in the series.

== Results ==
=== Season summary ===
Round	Circuit	Pole position	Fastest lap	Winning driver	Winning team	Aramco Driver of the Day
1	Bahrain International Circuit, Sakhir	(United Kingdom) Lucas Blakeley	(Netherlands) Thomas Ronhaar	(United Kingdom) Lucas Blakeley	(United Kingdom) McLaren Shadow	(Netherlands) Jarno Opmeer
2	(Italy) Autodromo Internazionale Enzo e Dino Ferrari, Imola	(Netherlands) Thomas Ronhaar	(United Kingdom) Brendon Leigh	(United Kingdom) Lucas Blakeley	(United Kingdom) McLaren Shadow	(United Kingdom) Lucas Blakeley
3	(United Kingdom) Silverstone Circuit, Silverstone	(Denmark) Frederik Rasmussen	(Finland) Joni Törmälä	(Denmark) Frederik Rasmussen	(Austria) Red Bull Racing Esports	(Netherlands) Thomas Ronhaar
4	(Austria) Red Bull Ring, Spielberg	(Denmark) Frederik Rasmussen	(Slovakia) Filip Prešnajder	(Netherlands) Thomas Ronhaar	(United States) Haas F1 Team Esports	(Netherlands) Thomas Ronhaar
5	(Belgium) Circuit de Spa-Francorchamps, Stavelot	(Denmark) Frederik Rasmussen	(Slovakia) Filip Prešnajder	(Iran) Bari Broumand	(United Kingdom) McLaren Shadow	(Iran) Bari Broumand
6	(Netherlands) Circuit Zandvoort, Zandvoort	(Netherlands) Thomas Ronhaar	(Poland) Piotr Stachulec	(United Kingdom) Lucas Blakeley	(United Kingdom) McLaren Shadow	(Poland) Tomasz Poradzisz
7	(Italy) Autodromo Nazionale di Monza, Monza	(France) Nicolas Longuet	(Italy) Daniele Haddad	(Netherlands) Thomas Ronhaar	(United States) Haas F1 Team Esports	(Hungary) Daniel Bereznay
8	Autódromo Hermanos Rodríguez, Mexico City	(Denmark) Frederik Rasmussen	(Poland) Tomasz Poradzisz	(Netherlands) Jarno Opmeer	(Germany) Mercedes-AMG Petronas Esports Team	(Netherlands) Jarno Opmeer
9	(United States) Circuit of the Americas, Austin, Texas	(Netherlands) Thomas Ronhaar	(Hungary) Patrik Sipos	(Netherlands) Jarno Opmeer	(Germany) Mercedes-AMG Petronas Esports Team	(United Kingdom) Brendon Leigh
10	(Japan) Suzuka International Racing Course, Suzuka	(Netherlands) Thomas Ronhaar	(Spain) Álvaro Carretón	(France) Nicolas Longuet	(Switzerland) Alfa Romeo Racing ORLEN F1 Esports Team	(France) Nicolas Longuet
11	(Brazil) Autódromo José Carlos Pace, São Paulo	(United Kingdom) Lucas Blakeley	(United Kingdom) Brendon Leigh	(United Kingdom) Lucas Blakeley	(United Kingdom) McLaren Shadow	(United Kingdom) Lucas Blakeley
12	(United Arab Emirates) Yas Marina Circuit, Abu Dhabi	(United Kingdom) Josh Idowu	(Poland) Tomasz Poradzisz	(Denmark) Frederik Rasmussen	(Austria) Red Bull Racing Esports	(Denmark) Frederik Rasmussen

== Championship standings ==
=== Scoring system ===
Points were awarded to the top 10 classified finishers in the race and one point was given to the driver who set the fastest lap inside the top ten. No extra points are awarded to the pole-sitter.

Position	1st	2nd	3rd	4th	5th	6th	7th	8th	9th	10th	FL
Points	25	18	15	12	10	8	6	4	2	1	1

In the event of a tie at the conclusion of the championship, a count-back system is used as a tie-breaker, with a driver's/constructor's best result used to decide the standings.

=== Drivers' Championship standings ===
Pos.	Driver	BHR (Bahrain)	EMI (Italy)	GBR (United Kingdom)	AUT (Austria)	BEL (Belgium)	NLD (Netherlands)	ITA (Italy)	MEX (Mexico)	USA (United States)	JPN (Japan)	BRA (Brazil)	UAE (United Arab Emirates)	Points
1	(United Kingdom) Lucas Blakeley	1^{P}	1	3	6	4	1	6	7	6	4	1^{P}	4	181
2	(Denmark) Frederik Rasmussen	8	3	1^{P}	2^{P}	2^{P}	3	5	12^{P}	5	3	2	1	173
3	(Netherlands) Thomas Ronhaar	Ret^{F}	4^{P}	2	1	7	9^{P}	1	3	2^{P}	2^{P}	6	2	165
4	(Iran) Bari Broumand	3	7	16	7	1	2	2	2	4	5	3	7	149
5	(Netherlands) Jarno Opmeer	2	11	5	4	6	4	17	1	1	Ret	8	6	122
6	(France) Nicolas Longuet	9	17	6	5	8	5	3^{P}	6	15	1	4	10	95
7	(United Kingdom) Josh Idowu	10	12		3	3		7	5			16	3^{P}	62
8	(United Kingdom) Brendon Leigh	7	19^{F}	7	11		6	15	9	3	6	17^{F}	8	49
9	(United Kingdom) Sebastian Job	6		4		5	8	20		16	7	10		41
10	(Germany) Marcel Kiefer	13	2	14	9	14	11	16	4	9	10	11	20	35
11	(Spain) Dani Moreno	5	5	13	8	13	7							30
12	(Hungary) Daniel Bereznay	Ret		17	18	12		4		7	12	7		24
13	(Germany) Simon Weigang	4	9	18	10	10	17	14	18	11	14	19	15	16
14	(Italy) David Tonizza		8		16	9		12	Ret				5	16
15	(Chile) Fabrizio Donoso	14		9		11	14			19	9	5		14
16	(Netherlands) Matthijs van Erven		6		19	19		19			8			12
17	(Hungary) Patrik Sipos	18	18	8	14	16	16	8		18^{F}	11	12	14	8
18	(United Kingdom) Jake Benham							13	8	12	15	9	12	6
19	(Spain) Álvaro Carretón	12	10	15	12		12			8	18^{F}	13	13	5
20	(United Kingdom) Luke Smith			10			18		19	13	16	14	9	3
21	(Slovakia) Filip Prešnajder	11	15		20^{F}	20^{F}		9	13					2
22	(Italy) Daniele Haddad		13			18	15	10^{F}	16	20	Ret		11	2
23	(United Kingdom) Shanaka Clay	15		12	17	15		11	10			18		1
24	(Finland) Joni Törmälä		Ret	19^{F}	15		13		11	10	17		19	1
25	(Poland) Tomasz Poradzisz		14				10		15^{F}				17^{F}	1
26	(Poland) Piotr Stachulec	17		11			20^{F}		17	17		Ret	18	0
27	(United Kingdom) John Evans				13	17	19	18	14			15	16	0
28	(Italy) Manuel Biancolilla	16	16	Ret						14	13			0
Pos.	Driver	BHR (Bahrain)	EMI (Italy)	GBR (United Kingdom)	AUT (Austria)	BEL (Belgium)	NLD (Netherlands)	ITA (Italy)	MEX (Mexico)	USA (United States)	JPN (Japan)	BRA (Brazil)	UAE (United Arab Emirates)	Points

Key
Colour	Result
Gold	Winner
Silver	Second place
Bronze	Third place
Green	Other points position
Blue	Other classified position
Blue	Not classified, finished (NC)
Purple	Not classified, retired (Ret)
Red	Did not qualify (DNQ)
Red	Did not pre-qualify (DNPQ)
Black	Disqualified (DSQ)
White	Did not start (DNS)
White	Race cancelled (C)
Blank	Did not enter
Annotation	Meaning
P	Pole position
F	Fastest lap

=== Teams' Championship standings ===
Pos.	Team	BHR (Bahrain)	EMI (Italy)	GBR (United Kingdom)	AUT (Austria)	BEL (Belgium)	NLD (Netherlands)	ITA (Italy)	MEX (Mexico)	USA (United States)	JPN (Japan)	BRA (Brazil)	UAE (United Arab Emirates)	Points
1	(United Kingdom) McLaren Shadow	1^{P}	1	3	6	1	1	2	2	4	4	1^{P}	4	330
1	(United Kingdom) McLaren Shadow	3	7	16	7	4	2	6	7	6	5	3	7	330
2	(Austria) Red Bull Racing Esports	8	2	1^{P}	2^{P}	2^{P}	3	5	4	5	3	2	1	208
2	(Austria) Red Bull Racing Esports	13	3	14	9	14	11	16	12^{P}	9	10	11	20	208
3	(United States) Haas F1 Team Esports	17	4^{P}	2	1	7	9^{P}	1	3	2^{P}	2^{P}	6	2	177
3	(United States) Haas F1 Team Esports	Ret^{F}	6	11	19	19	20^{F}	19	17	17	8	Ret	18	177
4	(Germany) Mercedes-AMG Petronas Esports Team	2	5	5	4	6	4	13	1	1	15	8	6	158
4	(Germany) Mercedes-AMG Petronas Esports Team	5	11	13	8	13	7	17	8	12	Ret	9	12	158
5	(Switzerland) Alfa Romeo Racing ORLEN F1 Esports Team	9	14	6	5	8	5	3^{P}	6	7	1	4	10	120
5	(Switzerland) Alfa Romeo Racing ORLEN F1 Esports Team	Ret	17	17	18	12	10	4	15^{F}	15	12	7	17^{F}	120
6	(Italy) Scuderia AlphaTauri Esports Team	6	12	4	3	3	8	7	5	10	7	10	3^{P}	104
6	(Italy) Scuderia AlphaTauri Esports Team	10	Ret	19^{F}	15	5	13	20	11	16	17	16	19	104
7	(Italy) Scuderia Ferrari Velas Esports Team	7	8	7	11	9	6	12	9	3	6	5	5	79
7	(Italy) Scuderia Ferrari Velas Esports Team	14	19^{F}	9	16	11	14	15	Ret	19	9	17^{F}	8	79
8	(United Kingdom) Aston Martin Cognizant Esports Team	4	9	18	10	10	17	14	14	11	13	15	15	16
8	(United Kingdom) Aston Martin Cognizant Esports Team	16	16	Ret	13	17	19	18	18	14	14	19	16	16
9	(France) Alpine Esports Team	11	15	8	14	16	16	8	13	13	11	12	9	13
9	(France) Alpine Esports Team	18	18	10	20^{F}	20^{F}	18	9	19	18^{F}	16	14	14	13
10	(United Kingdom) Williams Esports	12	10	12	12	15	12	10^{F}	10	8	18^{F}	13	11	8
10	(United Kingdom) Williams Esports	15	13	15	17	18	15	11	16	20	Ret	18	13	8
Pos.	Team	BHR (Bahrain)	EMI (Italy)	GBR (United Kingdom)	AUT (Austria)	BEL (Belgium)	NLD (Netherlands)	ITA (Italy)	MEX (Mexico)	USA (United States)	JPN (Japan)	BRA (Brazil)	UAE (United Arab Emirates)	Points

Key
Colour	Result
Gold	Winner
Silver	Second place
Bronze	Third place
Green	Other points position
Blue	Other classified position
Blue	Not classified, finished (NC)
Purple	Not classified, retired (Ret)
Red	Did not qualify (DNQ)
Red	Did not pre-qualify (DNPQ)
Black	Disqualified (DSQ)
White	Did not start (DNS)
White	Race cancelled (C)
Blank	Did not enter
Annotation	Meaning
P	Pole position
F	Fastest lap

Notes:

- The standings are sorted by best result, rows are not related to the drivers. In case of tie on points, the best positions achieved determined the outcome.
