= Pino D'Agostino =

Italian engineer

- Born: Taranto, Italy
- Citizenship: Italian
- Occupation: Engineer
- Years active: 1975 - 2003
- Employer(s): Autodelta, Alfa Romeo, Scuderia Ferrari

Giuseppe “Pino” D’Agostino (born 1948) is a retired Italian Formula One and motorsport engineer, best known for his senior roles in engine development with Alfa Romeo and Ferrari between the mid-1980s and early 2000s.

== Career ==
D’Agostino studied engineering at the University of Bologna. Following his graduation, D’Agostino briefly worked as a research bursary holder in agricultural mechanics at the University of Bologna. After deciding that academic work was not suited to his professional aspirations, he moved into industry, initially working for a manufacturing company before joining Maserati in 1975, shortly after the company’s transition from Citroën to De Tomaso ownership. At Maserati, he worked as an engineer at a time when the engineering department was extremely small by modern standards.

In the mid-1980s, D’Agostino joined Alfa Romeo, working within Autodelta, the manufacturer’s competition arm. During this period, he was responsible for engine design and development, including turbocharged V8 engines and later naturally aspirated power units as Formula One regulations transitioned away from turbocharging. He played a central role in the conceptual development of a naturally aspirated V10 engine configuration, which he identified as the optimal compromise between weight, packaging and performance under the new 3.5-litre regulations. This work formed part of Alfa Romeo’s wider motorsport engine programmes during the late 1980s and early 1990s. D’Agostino later became Technical Director of the engine department within the Fiat Group’s combined Abarth–Alfa Corse structure. During this period, he led engine development for Alfa Romeo’s highly successful DTM programme, including the design and rapid development of revised V6-based engines that contributed to Alfa Romeo’s championship-winning performances in the mid-1990s.

D’Agostino joined Scuderia Ferrari in late 1996, following Alfa Romeo’s withdrawal from top-level motorsport programmes. At Ferrari, he was appointed Head of Engine Operations within the engine department, working alongside Engine Director Paolo Martinelli and Head of Engine Design Gilles Simon. In this role, D’Agostino oversaw Ferrari’s engine test benches, trackside engine operations and race-weekend reliability management. He coordinated large engineering teams responsible for validating engines prior to race use and played a key role in the operational execution of Ferrari’s V10 engines during the team’s championship-winning era with Michael Schumacher.

In January 2004, D’Agostino left his role at Ferrari and moved into a new position within the broader Fiat organisation, with his responsibilities within the team taken over by Mattia Binotto.
