= Alfa Romeo in Formula One =

Formula One presence of Alfa Romeo

Alfa Romeo
- Full name: Alfa Romeo S.p.A. (1950–1951); Autodelta (1979); Marlboro Team Alfa Romeo (1980–1983); Benetton Team Alfa Romeo (1984–1985); Alfa Romeo Racing (2019); Alfa Romeo Racing Orlen (2020–2021); Alfa Romeo F1 Team Orlen (2022); Alfa Romeo F1 Team Stake (2023)
- Base: Milan, Italy (1950–1951, 1979–1985); Hinwil, Zürich, Switzerland (2019–2023)
- Founder(s): Alexandre Darracq; Ugo Stella; Nicola Romeo
- Noted staff: Gioacchino Colombo; Carlo Chiti; Gérard Ducarouge
- Noted drivers: (Italy) Nino Farina (Argentina) Juan Manuel Fangio (Italy) Riccardo Patrese (Monaco) Charles Leclerc (Finland) Kimi Räikkönen (Finland) Valtteri Bottas

Formula One World Championship career
- First entry: 1950 British Grand Prix
- Last entry: 2023 Abu Dhabi Grand Prix
- Races entered: 214
- Engines: Alfa Romeo, Ferrari
- Constructors' Championships: 0
- Drivers' Championships: 2 (1950, 1951)
- Race victories: 10
- Podiums: 26
- Points: 199 (363 (Note: Extra 164 points were earned by Alfa Romeo drivers in 1950 and 1951, before the Constructors' Championship was inaugurated in 1958.))
- Pole positions: 12
- Fastest laps: 16
- 2023 position: 9th (16 pts)

Alfa Romeo as a Formula One engine manufacturer
Formula One World Championship career
- First entry: 1950 British Grand Prix
- Last entry: 1987 Australian Grand Prix
- Races entered: 226 (215 starts)
- Chassis: Alfa Romeo, Alfa Special, De Tomaso, Cooper, LDS, McLaren, March, Brabham, Osella
- Constructors' Championships: 0
- Drivers' Championships: 2 (1950, 1951)
- Race victories: 12
- Podiums: 40
- Points: 148
- Pole positions: 15
- Fastest laps: 20

Italian motor manufacturer Alfa Romeo has participated multiple times in Formula One. The brand has competed in motor racing as both a constructor and engine supplier sporadically between 1950 and 1987, and later as a commercial partner between 2015 and 2023. The company's works drivers won the first two World Drivers' Championships in the pre-war Alfetta: Nino Farina in 1950 and Juan Manuel Fangio in 1951. Following these successes, Alfa Romeo withdrew from Formula One.

During the 1960s, although the company had no official presence in the top tier of motorsport, several Formula One teams used independently developed Alfa Romeo engines to power their cars. In the early 1970s, Alfa provided Formula One support for their works driver Andrea de Adamich, supplying adapted versions of their 3-litre V8 engine from the Alfa Romeo Tipo 33/3 sports car to power Adamich's McLaren (1970) and March (1971) entries. None of these engine combinations scored championship points.

In the mid-1970s, Alfa engineer Carlo Chiti designed a flat-12 engine to replace the T33 V8, which achieved some success in taking the 1975 World Sportscar Championship. Bernie Ecclestone, then owner of the Brabham Formula One team, persuaded Alfa Romeo to supply this engine free for the 1976 Formula One season. Although the Brabham-Alfa Romeo's first season was relatively modest, during the 1977 and 1978 World Championships their cars took 14 podium finishes, including two race victories for Niki Lauda.

The company's sporting department, Autodelta, returned as the works team in 1979. This second period as a constructor was less successful than the first. Between the company's return and its withdrawal as a constructor at the end of 1985, Alfa works drivers did not win a race and the team never finished higher than sixth in the World Constructors' Championship. The team's engines were also supplied to Osella from 1983 to 1987, but they scored only two World Championship points during this period.

The Alfa Romeo logo returned to Formula One in 2015, appearing on the Scuderia Ferrari cars. Alfa Romeo became the title sponsor for the Ferrari-powered Sauber team from 2018, and this commercial partnership was increased to a full renaming of the team beginning in 2019. Alfa Romeo did not have any technical involvement with the team, and the company ended its sponsorship of Sauber after 2023 and left Formula One to allow the team to be taken over by Audi from 2026.

== As a constructor ==
=== Pre-Formula One era: early success and Grands Prix winning (1920s–1940s) ===
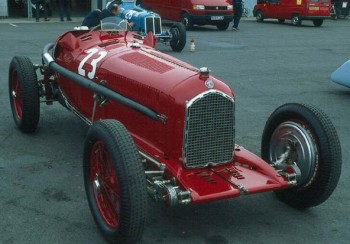
The Alfa Romeo P3.

Before World War II, Alfa Romeo was a dominant presence in Grand Prix motor racing. The P2 and the P3 consistently achieved victories until 1934, when the German Mercedes and Auto Union cars emerged and posed serious competition. By this time, Alfa Romeo had withdrawn temporarily as a manufacturer and was run by Enzo Ferrari and his Scuderia Ferrari team from 1929 to 1938. From 1934 to the start of World War II in 1939, Alfa often experienced a scarcity of victories, as their cars appeared underdeveloped compared to the technically advanced Mercedes.

After Alfa Corse retrieved its control of the brand from Ferrari, they made the Alfa Romeo 158 for the 1938 season. The 158, after subsequent updates, went on to become a dominant force in Gran Prix racing in the aftermath of the war. Alfa continued to use this car at Grands Prix from 1946 to 1948, withdrawing from racing in 1949 due to death of Jean-Pierre Wimille, Achille Varzi, and Carlo Felice Trossi, dominating the 1947 and 1948 Grand Prix seasons.

=== Success at the dawn of Formula One and retirement (1950–1951) ===
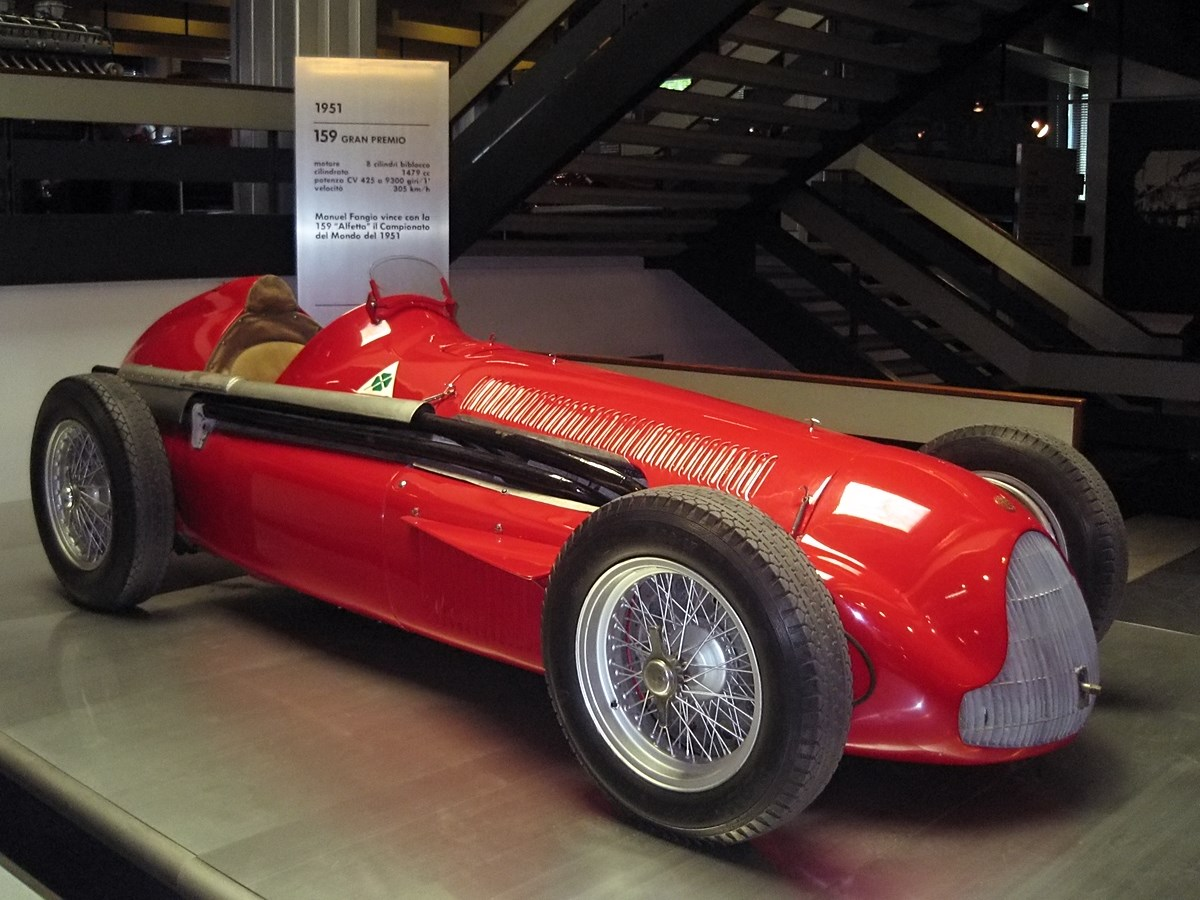
The Alfa Romeo 159 Formula 1 car.

Alfa Romeo experienced astounding success in the first two seasons of the Formula One World Championship. In 1950, Giuseppe Farina won the inaugural World Drivers' Championship in a 158 with a supercharger. The success was replicated the following year by Juan Manuel Fangio while driving an Alfetta 159 (an evolution of the 158 with a two-stage compressor). The Alfetta's engines were extremely powerful for their capacity: in 1951 the 159 engine was producing around 420 bhp (310 kW) but this was at the price of fuel consumption of 125 to 175 litres per 100 km (1.5 mpg–U.S. / 3 mpg–imp).

Surprisingly, the team won the two World Drivers' Championships on a very limited budget, using only nine engine blocks that were built before the war. In 1952, facing increased competition from Ferrari, the Istituto per la Ricostruzione Industriale, a public holding company controlling Alfa Romeo, decided to withdraw the team from Formula One after the Italian government's refusal to fund the expensive design of a new car to replace the 13-year-old model.

=== Second spell as a constructor (1979–1985) ===
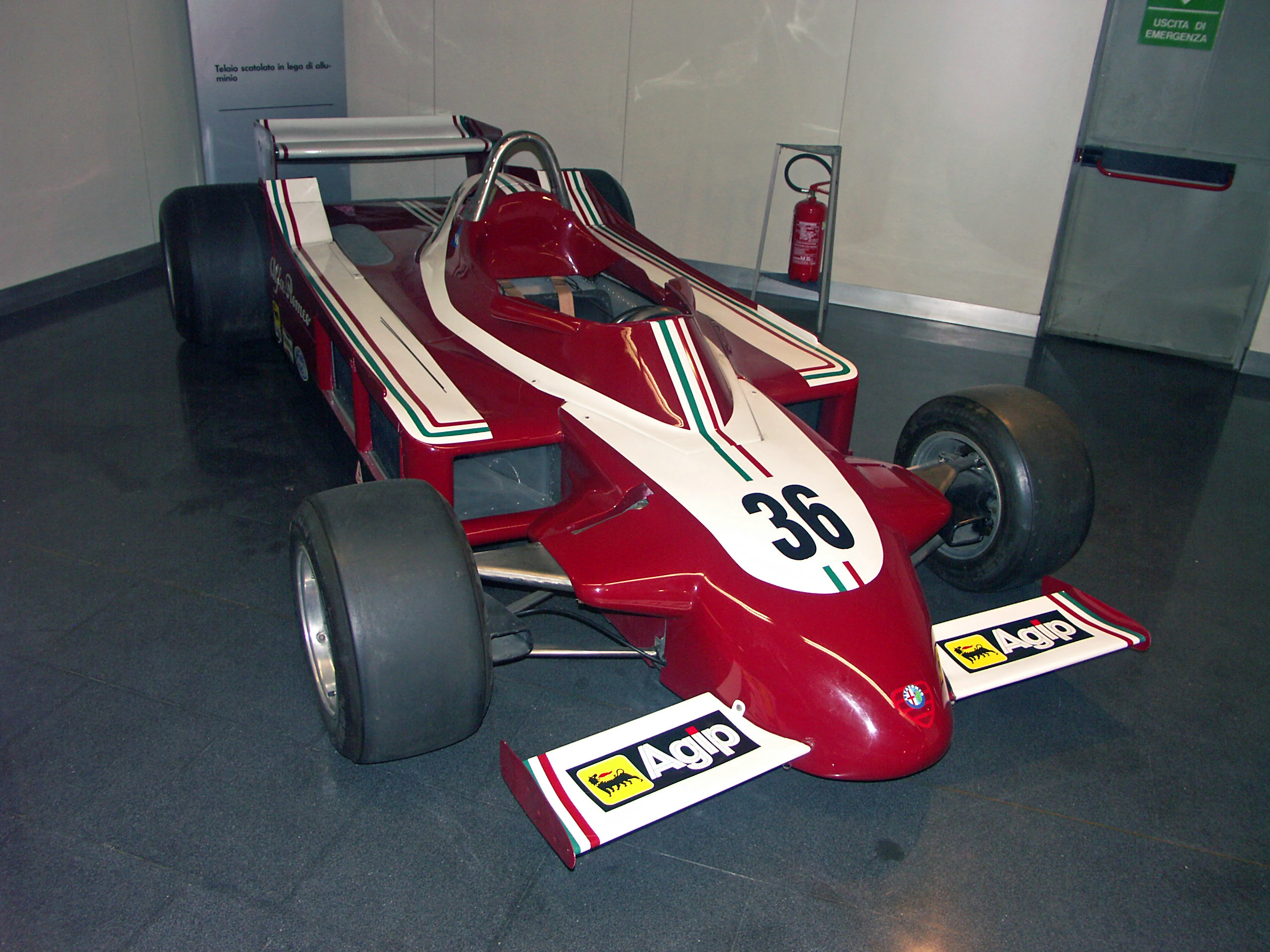
The Alfa Romeo 177 that was used during the 1979 season.

In 1976, Alfa Romeo started supplying engines to Brabham, winning two Grands Prix during the 1978 Formula One season. However, in 1977, Italian engine designer Carlo Chiti persuaded the team to develop their own Formula One car. The development, led by Alfa Romeo's competition department Autodelta, started in 1977. The result was the Alfa Romeo 177, which made its debut at the 1979 Belgian Grand Prix. The partnership with Brabham finished before the end of the 1979 season, with Brabham switching back to Cosworth DFV engines.

This second spell in Formula One was never truly successful and their performance was consistently hampered by reliability issues. In 1980, their driver Patrick Depailler died in a crash while testing for the 1980 German Grand Prix at the Hockenheimring. At the 1980 United States Grand Prix, Bruno Giacomelli obtained pole position with the Alfa Romeo 179, and led the race for 32 laps before the Alfa coasted to a halt with electrical trouble.

In 1981, the team's best achievement that year was Giacomelli's third-place finish at the 1981 Caesars Palace Grand Prix with an Alfa Romeo 179C. After a restructuring of Autodelta, the team operations and design of the car were outsourced to Euroracing in 1982, with the engines still being supplied by Autodelta. This year, the team achieved a pole position at the 1982 United States Grand Prix West and a third-place finish at the 1982 Monaco Grand Prix, both with Andrea De Cesaris driving the Alfa Romeo 182. The team's best season was 1983, when the team switched to the turbocharged 890T V8 engine and achieved the sixth place in the Constructors' Championship, largely thanks to two second-place finishes by Andrea de Cesaris with the Alfa Romeo 183T.

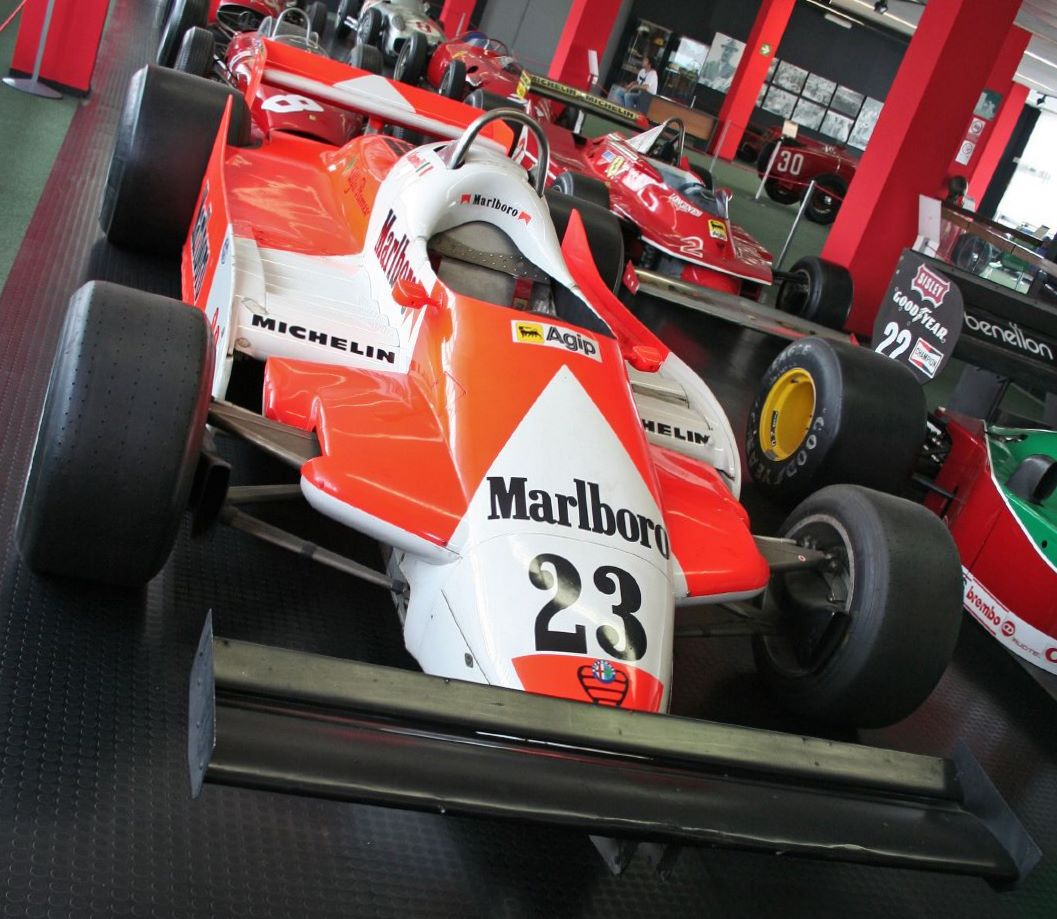
The Alfa Romeo 179B which was used during 1981.

While the turbocharged 890T had proved somewhat competitive in 1983, increasing competition from more powerful engines from BMW and TAG, plus the fact that FIA imposed 220-litre fuel limit with no re-fuelling allowed during pit stops during 1984 saw the decline of the Euroracing Alfa Romeo team as a competitive force in Grand Prix racing. The 890T (the only turbo V8 engine used in GP racing at this time) was very thirsty, and to temporarily rectify this problem, the drivers could interact with a knob regulating the turbo pressure, thus reducing the available power. Riccardo Patrese's third-place finish at the 1984 Italian Grand Prix was the last podium finish for the team, with both Patrese and Eddie Cheever often failing to finish races throughout 1984 and 1985 due to running out of fuel.

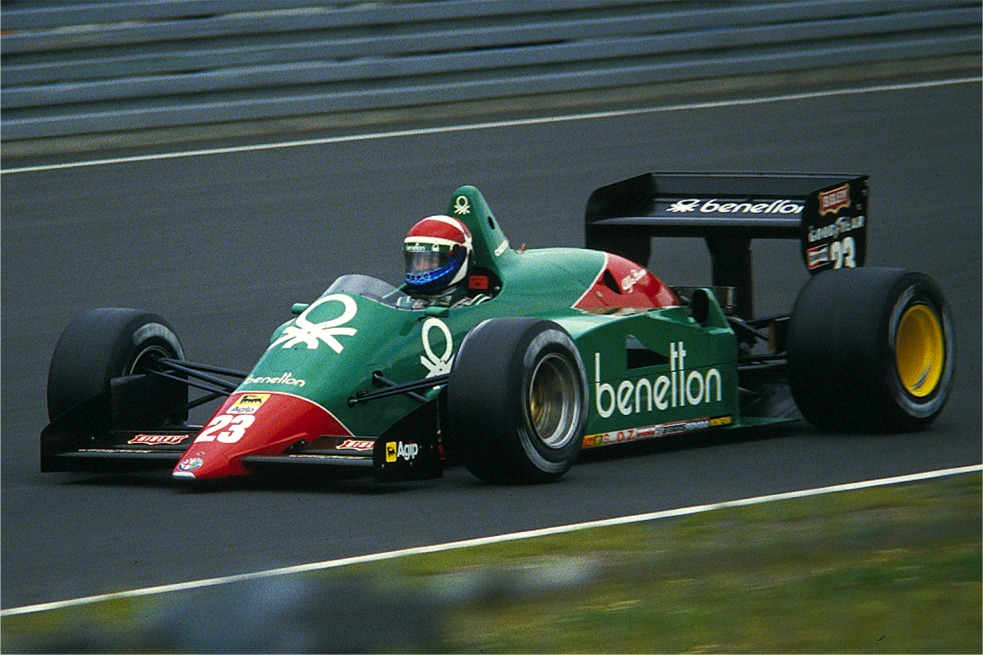
The Benetton sponsored Alfa Romeo 185T in 1985.

The team's 1985 car, the Alfa Romeo 185T, proved to be so uncompetitive that the 1984 car, the 184T, was re-called into service mid-season. After being updated to 1985 specifications the car, now dubbed the 184TB, was an improvement over the 1985 car, but results were still not forthcoming. In an interview he gave years later, Riccardo Patrese described the 185T as the worst car he had ever driven.

Alfa Romeo pulled out of Formula One as a constructor at the end of the 1985 season.

=== Commercial partnership with Sauber (2019–2023) ===
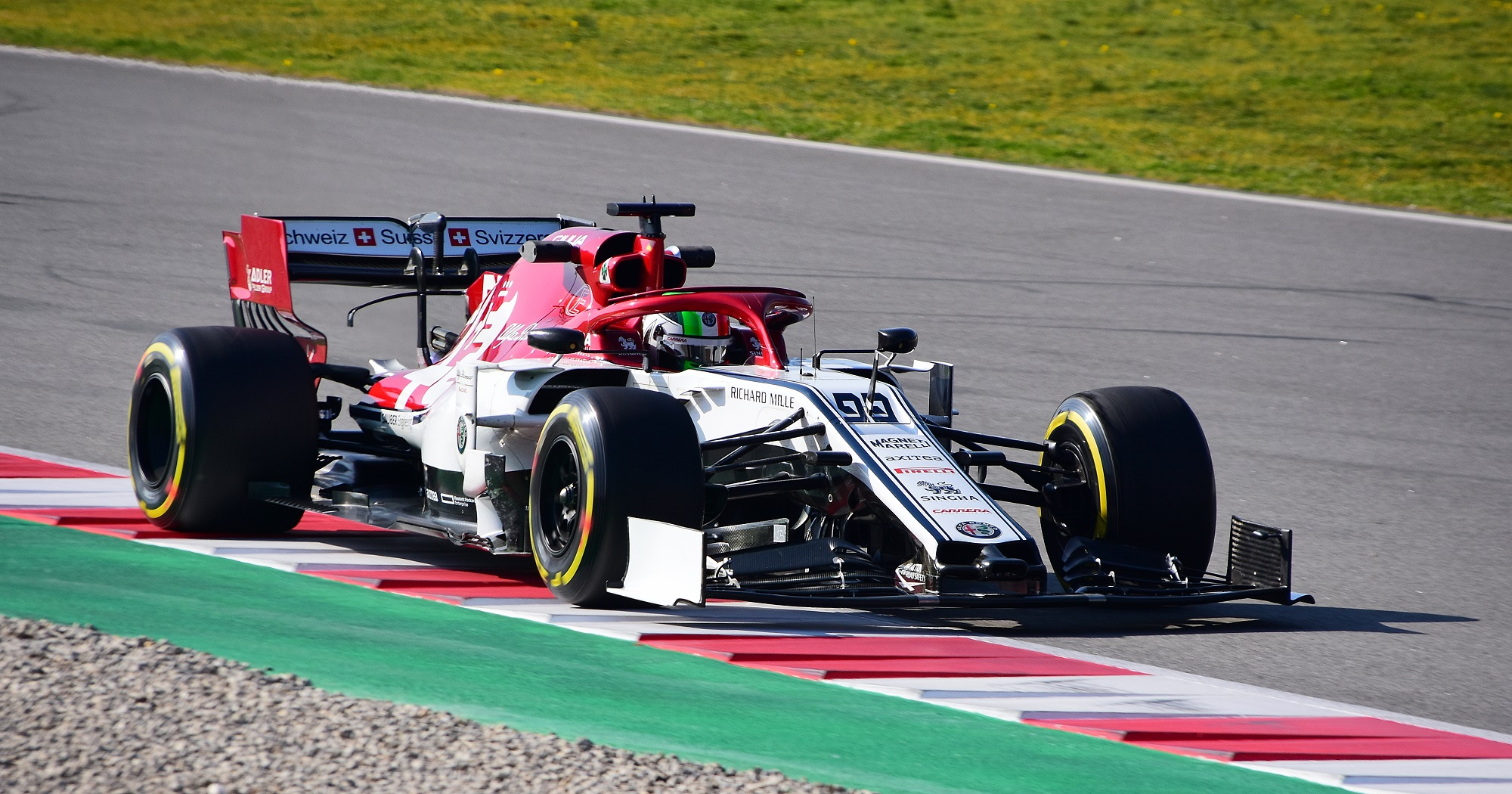
Antonio Giovinazzi, Alfa Romeo Racing C38 testing in Montmeló 2019.

On 1 February 2019, following the multi-year sponsorship agreement established in 2018, Sauber announced that the team would rename to Alfa Romeo Racing, while the ownership, Swiss racing licence, and management structure would remain unchanged. Alfa Romeo itself had no technical involvement with the team – which continued using customer Ferrari power units – with Sauber describing its relationship with the automaker as a "commercial partnership". Other sponsors for the season included Shell, Singha, Axitea, Carrera, Iveco, Richard Mille, Magneti Marelli, Pirelli, Claro, Adler-Pelzer, Hewlett Packard Enterprise, Betsafe, Little Mole, Singapore Airlines, Sparco, and Huski Chocolate.

Alfa Romeo's challenger for the 2019 season was the C38, continuing the naming convention from previous Sauber Formula One cars. The C38 included unique aerodynamic design elements in comparison to its rivals and predecessors, particularly at the front of the car as a result of regulation changes for the new season. In addition to Alfa Romeo, 2007 world champion Kimi Räikkönen and former Sauber reserve driver Antonio Giovinazzi were hired as the team's drivers. Giovinazzi led the 2019 Singapore Grand Prix for four laps, the first Alfa Romeo driver to lead a lap since Andrea de Cesaris did so at the 1983 Belgian Grand Prix. The team's best result of the year came at the chaotic Brazilian Grand Prix, where Räikkönen and Giovinazzi were classified 4th and 5th respectively. Alfa Romeo finished the year in 8th place in the Constructors' Championship with 57 points.

Alfa Romeo entered the 2020 season with an unchanged driver lineup. In January 2020, the team announced that they would enter a title sponsorship arrangement with Polish oil company PKN Orlen (renaming the team as Alfa Romeo Racing Orlen in 2020 and 2021 and as Alfa Romeo F1 Team Orlen in 2022) and that Robert Kubica would join as a reserve driver. Alfa Romeo finished the 2020 season in 8th place again, but this time scoring only 8 points.

In July 2021, Alfa Romeo Racing extended their deal with Sauber with a multi-year agreement with yearly assessments. In the 2021 season, the team finished in 9th place with 13 points. At the end of the season, Räikkönen retired from Formula One, while Giovinazzi departed the team to compete in Formula E.

For the 2022 season, the team signed former Mercedes driver Valtteri Bottas and Formula 2 graduate Zhou Guanyu, securing their best Constructors' Championship finish in 6th place since the beginning of their partnership with Sauber.

In January 2023, Alfa Romeo announced a multi-year title sponsorship agreement with online casino Stake, renaming the team as Alfa Romeo F1 Team Stake and having their logo displayed prominently on the C43. The team also signed a partnership agreement with live streaming platform Kick, which is invested by Stake co-founder and owner Eddie Craven. Kick's name and logo will replace Stake's in countries where gambling and sports betting advertisements are not allowed as Alfa Romeo F1 Team Kick. Alfa Romeo raced a revised Kick livery, coined the "disruptive livery," at the 2023 Belgian Grand Prix.

Alfa Romeo pulled out of Formula One at the end of 2023 and ended their partnership with Sauber, who are set to launch a works partnership with Audi in 2026.

== As an engine supplier ==
=== Naturally aspirated engines (1960s and 1970s) ===
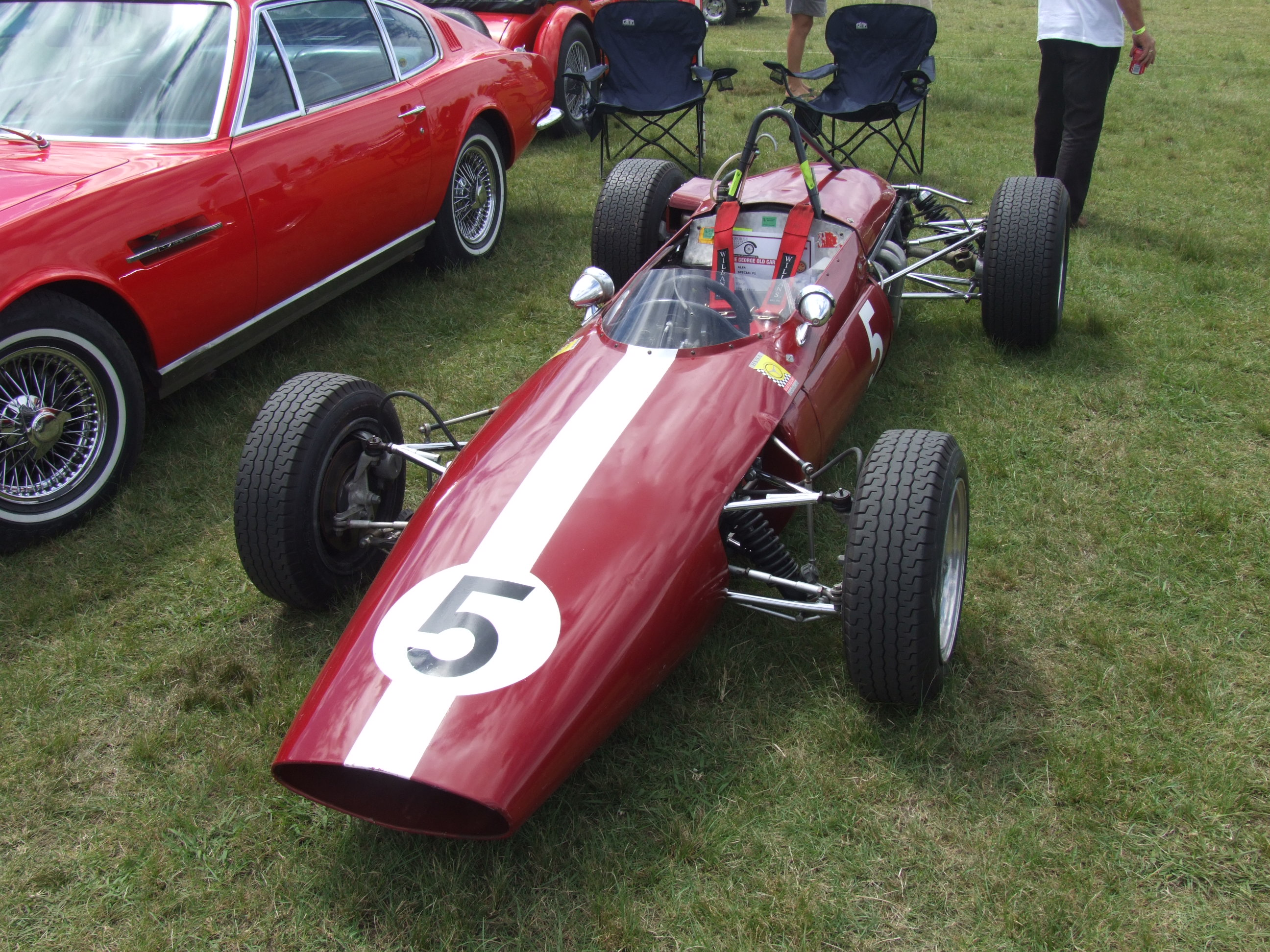
Peter de Klerk's Alfa Special.

During the 1960s, several minor F1 teams used Alfa Romeo straight-4 engines in cars such as the LDS Mk1 and Mk2 (1962–1963 and 1965), the Cooper T53 (1962), and the De Tomaso F1 (1961). None of these teams scored a single Championships point.

In 1962, Peter de Klerk created a custom-made, single-seater racing special built for the South African Formula One Championship, powered by an Alfa Romeo Giulietta 1.5-litre straight-4 engine, which was christened as the Alfa Special. The Special participated in two World Championship Grands Prix, retiring at the 1963 South African Grand Prix and finishing 10th at the 1965 South African Grand Prix. It also entered five non-championship Grands Prix, scoring a podium finish at the 1963 Rand Grand Prix.

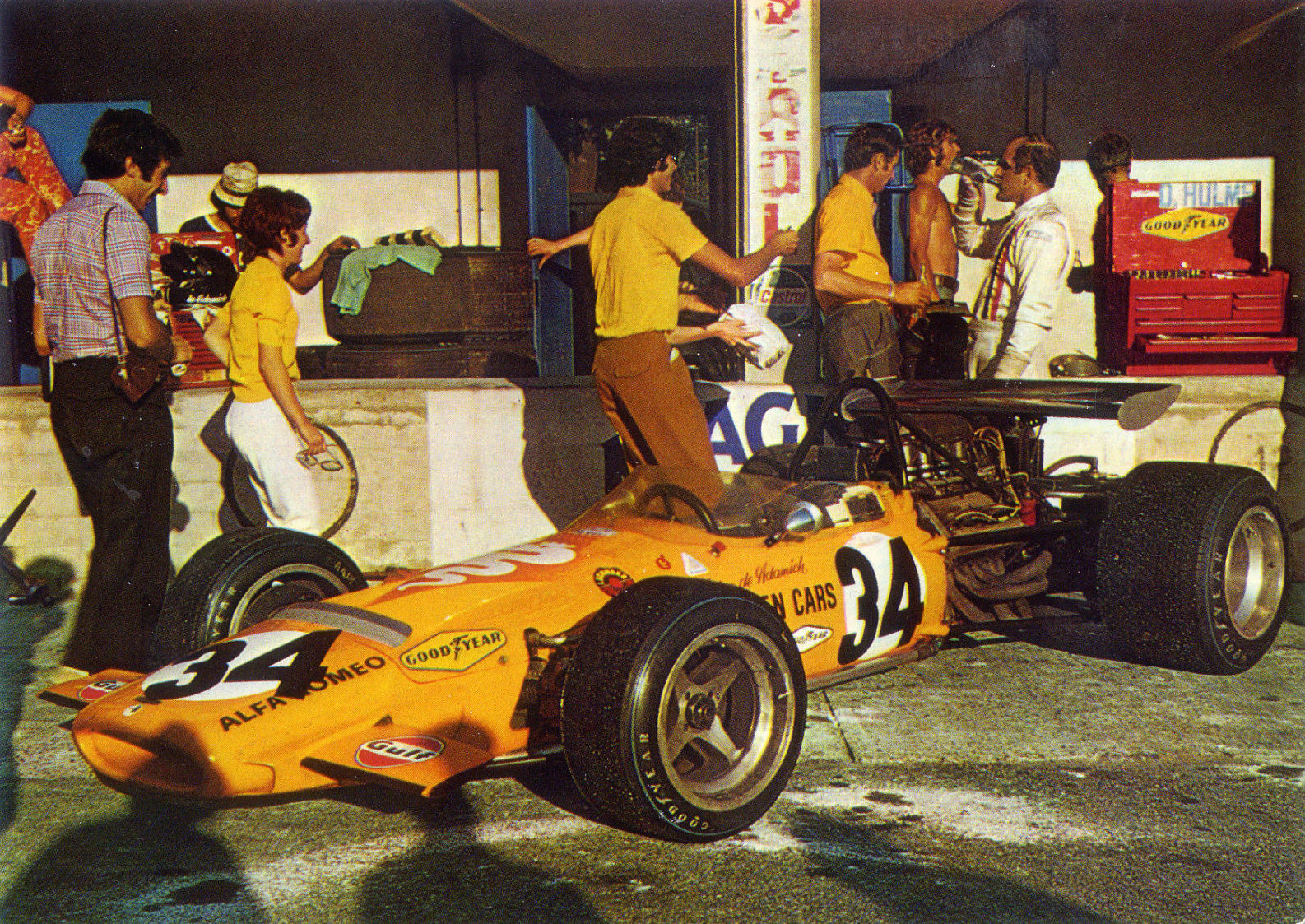
The 1970 McLaren-Alfa Romeo M14D.

At the end of the 1960s, Alfa Romeo was developing a new V8 engine for its racing cars, which was briefly tested on the Cooper T86C F1-3-68 by Lucien Bianchi.

Alfa Romeo briefly returned to Formula One for the 1970 and 1971 seasons with a V8 engine based on their sportscar unit used on the Alfa Romeo Tipo 33. In 1970, the unit was mainly entrusted to Andrea de Adamich, a long time Alfa driver, in the McLaren M7D and M14D. The combination often failed to qualify and was uncompetitive when it did run in the races. In 1971, a similar arrangement saw de Adamich run most of the second half of the season in a March 711, with a similar lack of success.

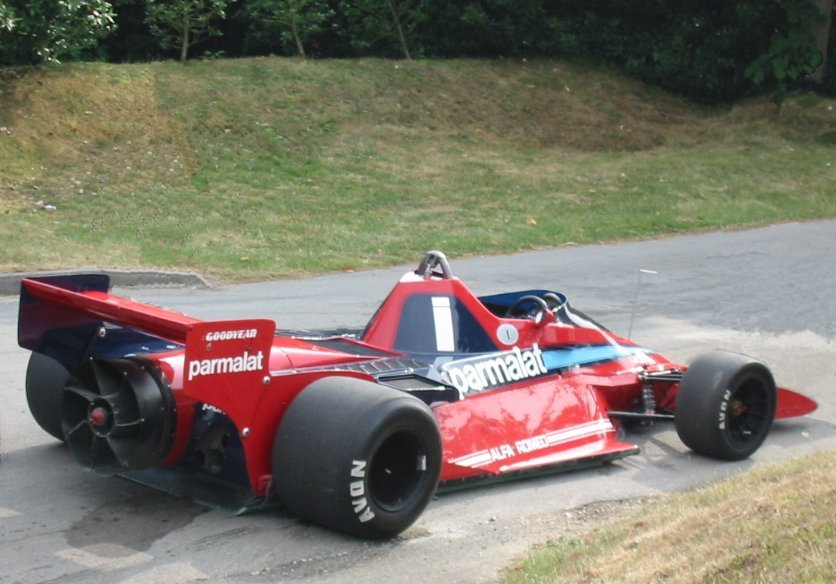
The radical 1978 Brabham BT46B, which was known as the "Fan Car" due to its large fan was powered by an Alfa Romeo engine.

In 1976, Bernie Ecclestone did a deal for the Brabham Formula One team to use Alfa Romeo engines based on their new flat-12 sports car unit designed by Carlo Chiti. The engines were free and produced a claimed 510 bhp (380 kW) against the 465 bhp (347 kW) of the ubiquitous Cosworth DFV; however, the 12-cylinder Alfa engine was heavier and used more oil and water than the 8-cylinder DFV, because of more mechanical processes going on in it. Packaging the engines was difficult – they had to be removed to change the spark plugs – and the high fuel consumption engine required no fewer than four separate fuel tanks to contain 47 imperial gallons (214 L; 56 US gal) of fuel. While the Brabham BT45 (1976) proved quite unsuccessful, the upgraded BT45B (1977) represented an proviment. Gordon Murray's increasingly adventurous designs, like the BT46 which won two races in 1978 (the Swedish and the Italian Grand Prixs) and finished third in the Constructors standings, were partly a response to the challenge of producing a suitably light and aerodynamic chassis around the bulky unit. When aerodynamic ground effect became critical in 1978, it was clear that the low, wide engines would interfere with the large venturi tunnels under the car which were needed to create the ground effect. At Murray's instigation, Alfa produced a narrower V12 design in only three months for the 1979 season, but it proved to be unreliable and fuel-inefficient.

=== Turbo engines (1983–1988) ===
For the 1987 season, Alfa Romeo made a deal to supply engines to Ligier. Designed by Gianni Tonti, the Alfa Romeo 415T four-cylinder turbo engine was tested in a Ligier JS29 by René Arnoux. When Fiat (the same company that owned F1 giant Ferrari) took control of Alfa Romeo, the deal was cancelled (ostensibly due to negative remarks by Arnoux about the engine) and Ligier had to use Megatron (ex BMW) engines for the entirety of the 1987 season.

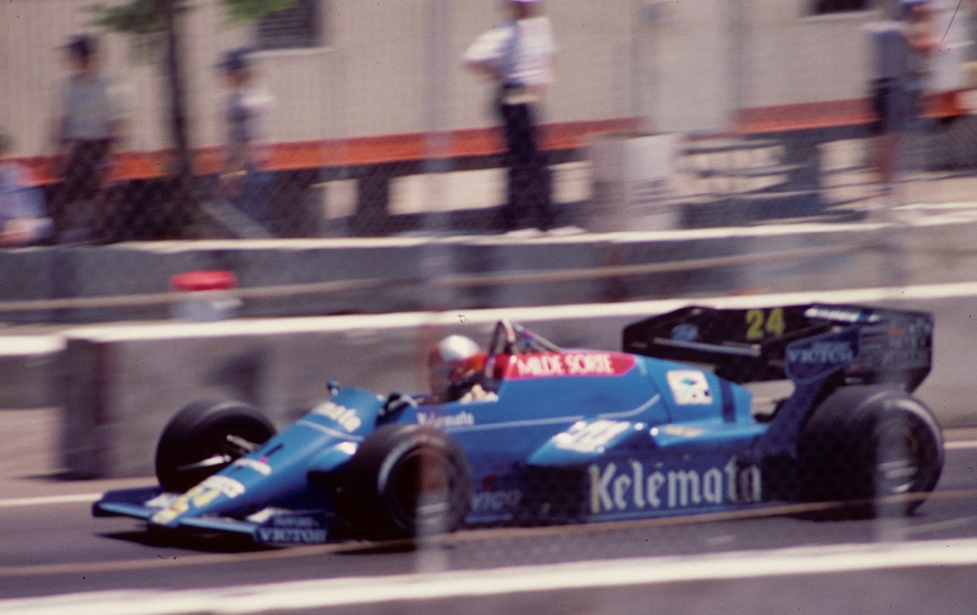
1984 Osella FA1F powered by an Alfa Romeo turbo engine

Alfa also supplied expertise and engines to the small and unsuccessful Italian Osella team from 1983 to 1987. For the second half of the 1983 season, the Alfa Romeo 182's normally aspirated engine (along with other rear-end components) used during the previous season were deployed on the Osella FA1E, which achieved a 10th place as the best result. From 1984 to 1987, Alfa Romeo V8 turbo engines were used on Osella's cars, starting with the 1984 Osella FA1F, which was based on the 1983 works Alfa Romeo 183T, and continuing with the FA1G, FA1H, and FA1I, achieving two fifth places as the best results (1984 Dallas and Italian Grand Prix).

By 1988, the last turbo season, Alfa was fed up with the negative publicity generated by Osella's cars, so the Milan-based manufacturer prohibited the further use of its name in connection with the engine. As a result, the 1988 Alfa engines mounted on the FA1L were simply dubbed "Osella V8". At the end of that season, the relationship finished, signifying the end of Alfa Romeo's involvement in Formula One for about three decades.

=== Naturally aspirated V10 (1985–1988) ===
In 1985, Alfa Romeo started a V10 Formula One engine project, in anticipation of the upcoming rules forbidding turbo engines. The engine was targeted to be used with Ligier Formula One cars. This was the first modern V10 Formula One engine, followed soon by Honda and Renault engines. The Alfa Romeo V1035 F1 engine was designed by Pino D'Agostino during the 1986 season. At 12,500rpm, the peak power reached slightly over 600bhp, and the maximum torque was 373Nm. After the co-operation with Ligier was cancelled in 1986, the engine was made available for the 164 Pro Car project and ultimately never raced in F1.

In 1988, Alfa Romeo (part of the Fiat Group) bought Motor Racing Developments Ltd. (otherwise known as the Brabham F1 team) to build a chassis for a new ProCar series. The developed car featured a V10 engine and adopted the body of an Alfa Romeo 164, designated as the Brabham BT57. Its intended purpose was to participate in a distinct racing series, serving as a support event during Formula One Grands Prix, but this event was scrapped.

== Team partnerships ==
=== Scuderia Ferrari (2015–2018) ===
The Alfa Romeo branding was featured on the Scuderia Ferrari Formula One cars from the 2015 to the 2018 season. This began with the Ferrari SF15-T and continued with subsequent models SF16-H, SF70H, and SF71H.

=== Sauber F1 Team (2018–2023) ===
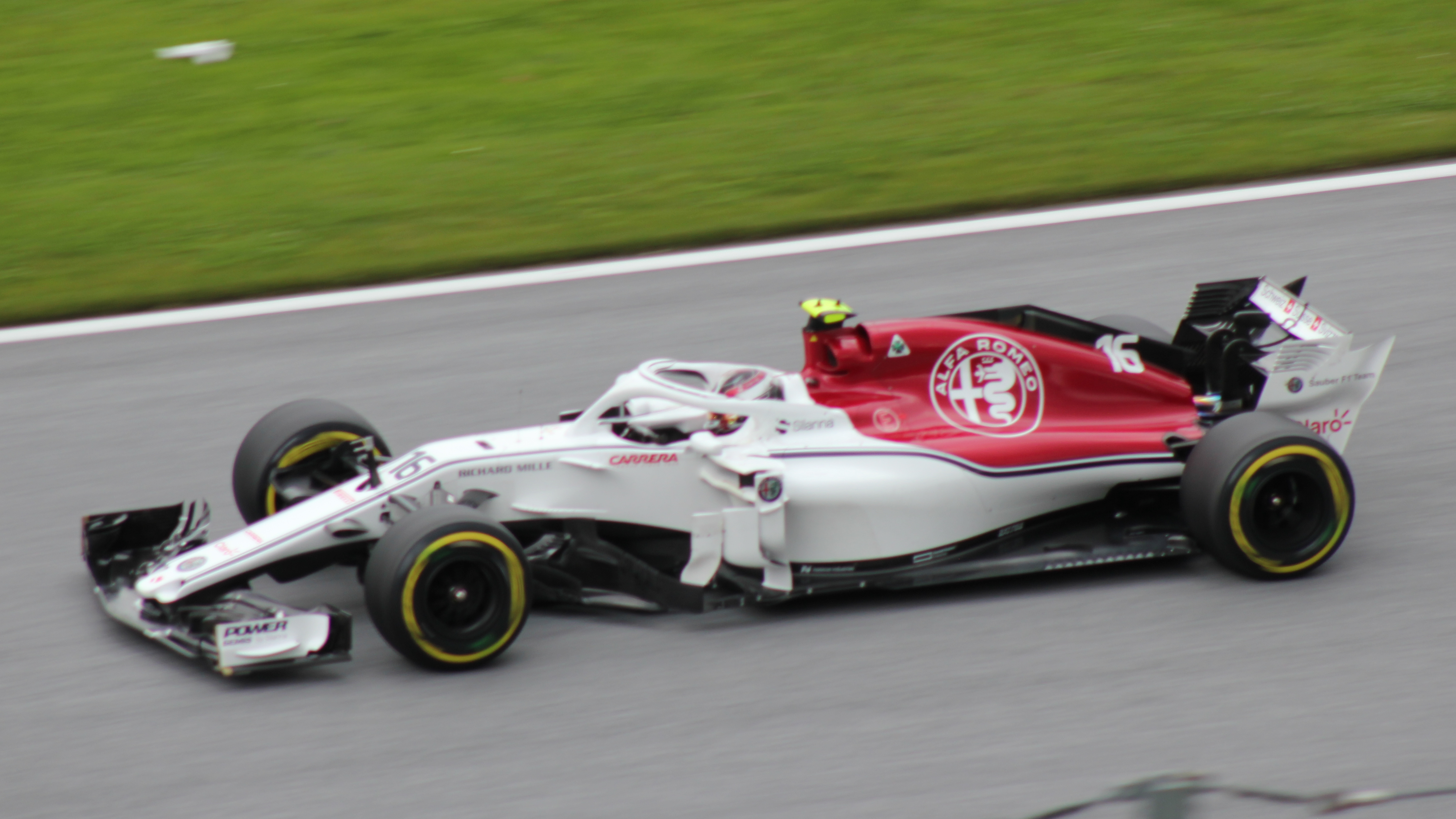
Charles Leclerc driving the Alfa Romeo Sauber F1 Team's Sauber C37 during the 2018 Austrian Grand Prix.

On 29 November 2017, it was announced that Alfa Romeo would be the title sponsor of the Sauber Formula One team starting from the 2018 season in a multi-year technical and commercial partnership agreement as Alfa Romeo Sauber F1 Team. On 2 December 2017, a press conference was held at the Alfa Romeo Museum in Arese, Milan, illustrating the terms of the agreement between the FCA Group and the Swiss team followed by a presentation ceremony for the livery and the driver line-up consisting of Charles Leclerc and Marcus Ericsson.

A January 2018 interview with Frederic Vasseur revealed that Alfa Romeo intended to take over the Sauber team. On 1 February 2019, it was announced that the team would enter the 2019 season as Alfa Romeo Racing with the ownership and management structure remaining unchanged.

On 26 August 2022, It was announced that Alfa Romeo would be ending its ties to the Sauber Formula One team by the end of 2023, not long after Audi announced it would take over Sauber in 2026.

== Complete Formula One results ==
(Bold indicates championships won)

Year	Name	Car	Engine	Tyres	No.	Drivers	Points	WCC
1950	(Italy) Alfa Romeo S.p.A.	158	158 1.5 L8 s	P	—N/a	(Argentina) Juan Manuel Fangio (Italy) **Giuseppe Farina** (Italy) Luigi Fagioli (United Kingdom) Reg Parnell (Italy) Piero Taruffi (Italy) Consalvo Sanesi	—N/a	
1951	(Italy) Alfa Romeo S.p.A.	159	158 1.5 L8 s	P	—N/a	(Argentina) **Juan Manuel Fangio** (Italy) Giuseppe Farina (Italy) Luigi Fagioli (Italy) Felice Bonetto (Switzerland) Toulo de Graffenried (Italy) Consalvo Sanesi (Germany) Paul Pietsch	—N/a	
1952–1978: Alfa Romeo did not compete as a constructor
1979	(Italy) Autodelta	177; 179	115-12 3.0 F12; 1260 3.0 V12	G	35. 36.	(Italy) Bruno Giacomelli (Italy) Vittorio Brambilla	0	NC
1980	(Italy) Marlboro Team Alfa Romeo	179	1260 3.0 V12	G	22. 22. 22. 23.	(France) Patrick Depailler (Italy) Vittorio Brambilla (Italy) Andrea de Cesaris (Italy) Bruno Giacomelli	4	11th
1981	(Italy) Marlboro Team Alfa Romeo	179B; 179C; 179D	1260 3.0 V12	M	22. 23.	(United States) Mario Andretti (Italy) Bruno Giacomelli	10	9th
1982	(Italy) Marlboro Team Alfa Romeo	179D; 182	1260 3.0 V12	M	22. 23.	(Italy) Andrea de Cesaris (Italy) Bruno Giacomelli	7	10th
1983	(Italy) Marlboro Team Alfa Romeo	183T	890T 1.5 V8 t	M	22. 23.	(Italy) Andrea de Cesaris (Italy) Mauro Baldi	18	6th
1984	(Italy) Benetton Team Alfa Romeo	184T	890T 1.5 V8 t	G	22. 23.	(Italy) Riccardo Patrese (United States) Eddie Cheever	11	8th
1985	(Italy) Benetton Team Alfa Romeo	185T; 184TB	890T 1.5 V8 t	G	22. 23.	(Italy) Riccardo Patrese (United States) Eddie Cheever	0	NC
1986–2018: Alfa Romeo did not compete as a constructor
2019	(Switzerland) Alfa Romeo Racing	C38	Ferrari 064 1.6 V6 t	P	7. 99.	(Finland) Kimi Räikkönen (Italy) Antonio Giovinazzi	57	8th
2020	(Switzerland) Alfa Romeo Racing Orlen	C39	Ferrari 065 1.6 V6 t	P	7. 99.	(Finland) Kimi Räikkönen (Italy) Antonio Giovinazzi	8	8th
2021	(Switzerland) Alfa Romeo Racing Orlen	C41	Ferrari 065/6 1.6 V6 t	P	7. 88. 99.	(Finland) Kimi Räikkönen (Poland) Robert Kubica (Italy) Antonio Giovinazzi	13	9th
2022	(Switzerland) Alfa Romeo F1 Team Orlen	C42	Ferrari 066/7 1.6 V6 t	P	24. 77.	(China) Zhou Guanyu (Finland) Valtteri Bottas	55	6th
2023	(Switzerland) Alfa Romeo F1 Team Stake	C43	Ferrari 066/10 1.6 V6 t	P	24. 77.	(China) Zhou Guanyu (Finland) Valtteri Bottas	16	9th

=== Drivers' Champions ===
- (Italy) Giuseppe Farina (1950)
- (Argentina) Juan Manuel Fangio (1951)

== Formula One customer engine results ==
Constructor	Season(s)	Total wins	First win	Last win
(Italy) De Tomaso	1961	0	–	–
(South Africa) LDS	1962–1963, 1965	0	–	–
(South Africa) Alfa Special	1963, 1965	0	–	–
(United Kingdom) Cooper	1962	0	–	–
(United Kingdom) McLaren	1970	0	–	–
(United Kingdom) March	1971	0	–	–
(United Kingdom) Brabham	1976–1979	2	1978 Swedish Grand Prix	1978 Italian Grand Prix
(Italy) Osella	1983–1987**	0	–	–
Total	1961–1987	2	1978 Swedish Grand Prix	1978 Italian Grand Prix

- Excludes factory team
- The Alfa Romeo 890T was continued to be used in 1988 by the Osella team, though it was badged as the Osella 890T for the season as Alfa had withdrawn their support for the engine

== Esports ==
Year	Name	Car	Engine	Tyres	No.	Drivers	Points	WCC
2018	(Switzerland) Alfa Romeo Racing Sauber F1 eSports Team	C37	Ferrari 063 1.6 V6 t	P	22. 46. 23.	(United Kingdom) Salih Saltunç (United Kingdom) Sonuc Saltunç (Netherlands) Allert van der Wal	119	3rd
2019	(Switzerland) Alfa Romeo Racing F1 Esports	C38	Ferrari 064 1.6 V6 t	P	12. 22. 21.	(Hungary) Daniel Bereznay (United Kingdom) Salih Saltunç (Sweden) Kimmy Larsson	176	3rd
2020	(Switzerland) Alfa Romeo Racing Orlen Esports	C39	Ferrari 065 1.6 V6 t	P	12. 34. N.A.	(Hungary) Daniel Bereznay (Netherlands) Jarno Opmeer (Austria) Dominik Hofmann	295	2nd
2021	(Switzerland) Alfa Romeo Racing ORLEN F1 Esports Team	C41	Ferrari 065/6 1.6 V6 t	P	30. 83. N.A.	(Germany) Simon Weigang (Slovakia) Filip Prešnajder (Netherlands) Thijmen Schütte	12	9th
2022	(Switzerland) Alfa Romeo Racing ORLEN F1 Esports Team	C42	Ferrari 066/7 1.6 V6 t	P	15. 40. 71.	(Hungary) Daniel Bereznay (France) Nicholas Longuet (Poland) Tomasz Poradzisz	120	5th
2023–24	(Switzerland) Kick F1 Sim Racing Team	C43	Ferrari 1.6 V6 t	P	39. 72. N.A.	(Netherlands) Thomas Ronhaar (United Kingdom) Brendon Leigh (Netherlands) Xander van Dijken	213	2nd

=== Esports Drivers' Champions ===
The following drivers won the Formula One Esports Drivers' Championship for Sauber Esport:

- (Netherlands) Jarno Opmeer (2020).

=== Complete F1 Esports Series results ===
Year	Chassis	Drivers	1	2	3	4	5	6	7	8	9	10	11	12	Points	WCC
2018	Sauber C37		AUS	CHN	AZE	FRA	GBR	BEL	GER	SIN	USA	ABU			119	3rd
2018	Sauber C37	(United Kingdom) Salih Saltunç	8	6	13	6	7	4	1	13	4	8			119	3rd
2018	Sauber C37	(United Kingdom) Sonuc Saltunç	15			17	5	8	18	17					119	3rd
2018	Sauber C37	(Netherlands) Allert van der Wal		18	7						15	6			119	3rd
2019	Alfa Romeo Racing C38		BHR	CHN	AZE	CAN	RBR	GBR	GER	BEL	ITA	JPN	USA	BRA	176	3rd
2019	Alfa Romeo Racing C38	(Hungary) Daniel Bereznay	19	Ret	7	13	5	3	4	1	1	18	5	1	176	3rd
2019	Alfa Romeo Racing C38	(Turkey) Salih Saltunç	3	4	9	11	10	16	9	9	11	13	9	4	176	3rd
2019	Alfa Romeo Racing C38	(Sweden) Kimmy Larsson													176	3rd
2020	Alfa Romeo C39		BHR	VIE	CHN	NED	CAN	RBR	GBR	BEL	ITA	JPN	MEX	BRA	295	2nd
2020	Alfa Romeo C39	(Hungary) Daniel Bereznay	2	15	3	12	8	12	3	2	16	9	4	3	295	2nd
2020	Alfa Romeo C39	(Netherlands) Jarno Opmeer	1	3	1	2	1	3	9	5	2	4	1	7	295	2nd
2020	Alfa Romeo C39	(Denmark) Dominik Hofmann													295	2nd
2021	Alfa Romeo C41		BHR	CHN	RBR	GBR	ITA	BEL	POR	NED	USA	EMI	MEX	BRA	12	9th
2021	Alfa Romeo C41	(Germany) Simon Weigang	13	Ret	7	13	14	9	19	14	20	9	13	15	12	9th
2021	Alfa Romeo C41	(Slovakia) Filip Prešnajder		10	14	16	17	Ret	20		12	12	18		12	9th
2021	Alfa Romeo C41	(Netherlands) Thijmen Schüte	18							12				10	12	9th
2022	Alfa Romeo C42		BHR	EMI	GBR	RBR	BEL	NED	ITA	MEX	USA	JPN	BRA	UAE	120	5th
2022	Alfa Romeo C42	(Hungary) Daniel Bereznay	Ret		17	18	12		4		7	12	7		120	5th
2022	Alfa Romeo C42	(France) Nicolas Longuet	9	17	6	5	8	5	3	6	15	1	4	10	120	5th
2022	Alfa Romeo C42	(Poland) Tomasz Poradzisz		14				10		15				17	120	5th
2023–24	Alfa Romeo C43		BHR	JED	RBR	GBR	BEL	NED	USA	MEX	BRA	LVG	QAT	UAE	223	2nd
2023–24	Alfa Romeo C43	(Netherlands) Thomas Ronhaar	1	2	2	8	10	11	19	1	1	4	3	2	223	2nd
2023–24	Alfa Romeo C43	(United Kingdom) Brendon Leigh	12	16	12	5	7	10	3	Ret	7	7	16	9	223	2nd
2023–24	Alfa Romeo C43	(Netherlands) Xander van Dijken													223	2nd

== See also ==
- Alfa Romeo in motorsport
