= Jarno Opmeer =

Dutch esports driver (born 2000)

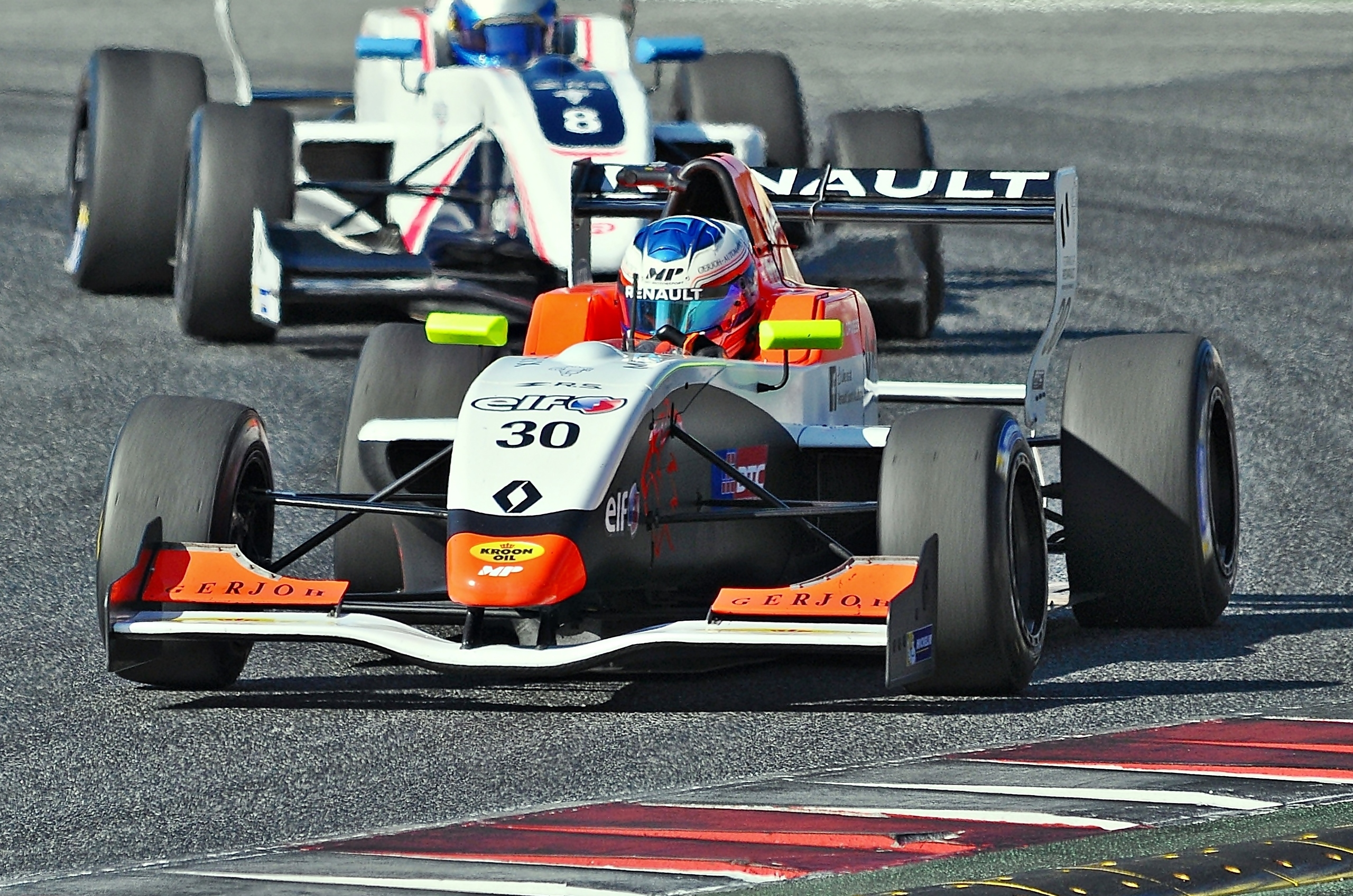
- Opmeer driving the Barazi-Epsilon FR2.0-10 during the 2017 Formula Renault Eurocup
- Born: 11 April 2000 (age 26); Dordrecht, South Holland, Netherlands
- Nationality: (Netherlands) Dutch

Formula One Esports Series career
- Debut season: 2019
- Current team: Red Bull Sim Racing
- Car number: 5
- Starts: 84
- Championships: 3 (2020, 2021, 2025)
- Wins: 17
- Podiums: 35
- Poles: 5
- Fastest laps: 9
- Finished last season: 3rd (114 pts)

Previous series
- 2017; 2017; 2016; 2016: Formula Renault Eurocup; Formula Renault NEC; SMP F4; F4 Spanish
Medal record
Sim racing
Representing Netherlands
Race of Champions
Winner	2022 Piteå	eROC
Runner-up	2023 Piteå	eROC

Jarno Opmeer (Dutch pronunciation: [ˈjaːrnoː oːpˈmeːr]; born 11 April 2000) is a Dutch esports driver and former racing driver who competes in the Formula One Esports Series for Red Bull Racing. Opmeer has won a record three Formula One Sim Racing World Championship titles, which he won in 2020, 2021, and 2025, and has won 15 races across six seasons.

Born in Dordrecht, Opmeer began competitive kart racing at an early age, winning several national titles before graduating to junior formulae in 2016. He finished runner-up to Richard Verschoor in the SMP F4 Championship that year with MP Motorsport, also achieving several podiums in F4 Spanish. He then progressed to the Formula Renault Eurocup in 2017 with MP as part of the Renault Sport Academy, achieving a podium in the Northern European Cup, but was dropped by the team four rounds into the following season.

Opmeer moved into sim racing for the 2019 Formula One Esports Series with Renault, finishing fourth in his rookie season. He then moved to Alfa Romeo for 2020, winning his maiden championship. He defended his title with Mercedes in 2021. After three seasons with Mercedes, he moved to Red Bull for the 2025 season onwards, winning the title that year. Outside of Formula One Esports, he also competed in Formula E: Accelerate for Mercedes-EQ from 2021 to 2022. Opmeer also likes to play other racing games, or competes in league racing on F1, which he frequently streams on Twitch and posts videos on YouTube. He is the most popular F1 sim racer, having the most followers and subscribers on Social Media, and is seen by most as the best F1 sim racer ever, having won the most Esports and league racing titles.

== Career ==
=== Formula 4 ===
Opmeer graduated to single-seaters in 2016, participating in the SMP F4 Championship. He took seven victories and thirteen podiums in his debut year of F4, finishing second place in the championship to fellow countryman Richard Verschoor.

Opmeer also participated in two race meetings of the Spanish F4 with MP Motorsport, taking five podiums out of six races.

=== Formula Renault ===
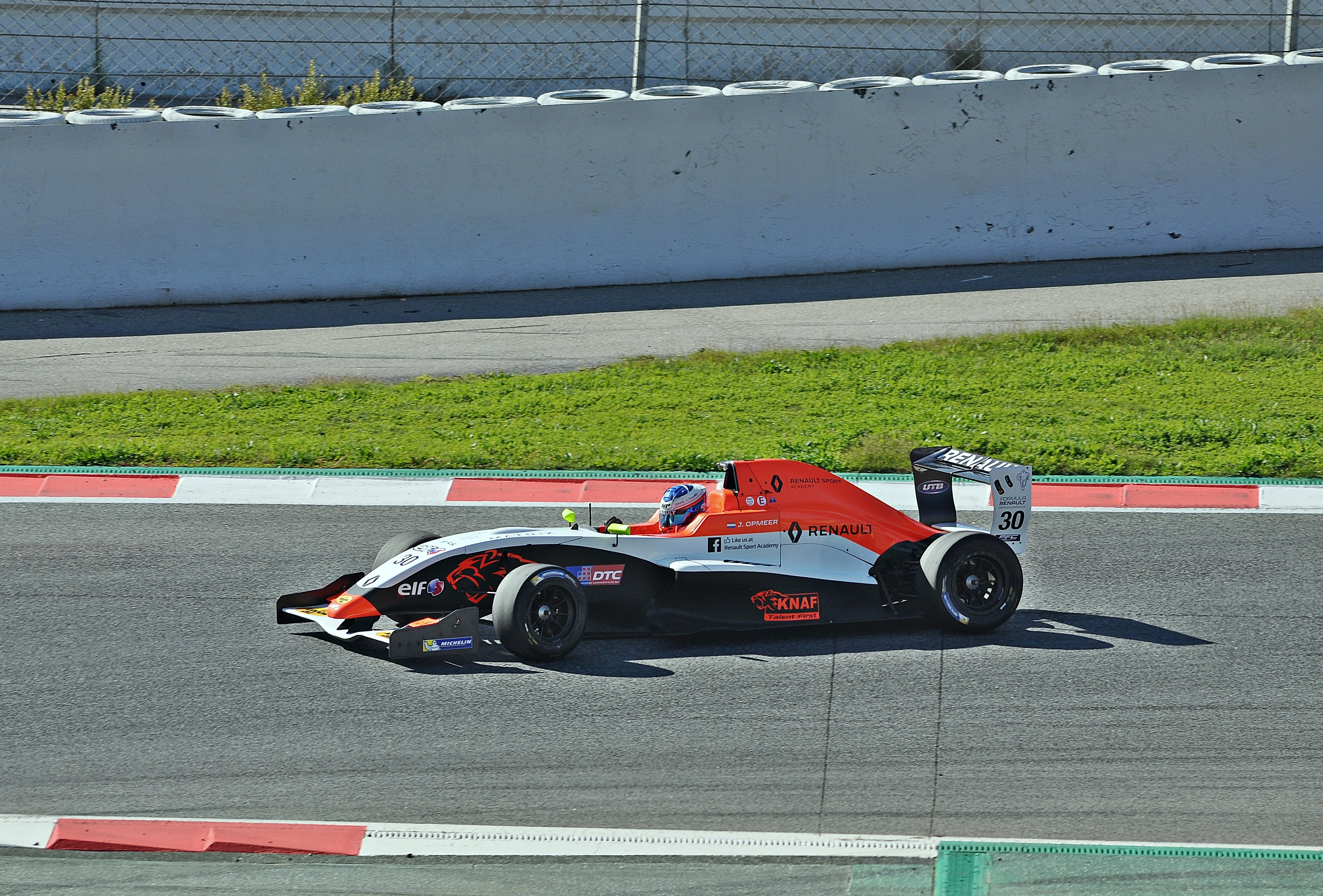
Opmeer at the Circuit de Barcelona-Catalunya in 2017

In 2017, Opmeer continued his collaboration with MP and joined the Eurocup championship. He had seven-point-scoring finishes including the fifth place in the penultimate race of the season at Circuit de Barcelona-Catalunya. While in the standings he ended fifteenth, behind his teammates Richard Verschoor and Neil Verhagen.

=== Formula One ===
In February 2017, Opmeer was inducted into the Renault Sport Academy.

==== Formula One Esports ====
In April 2019, Opmeer was signed to Renault–Vitality Esports Team as a driver for the third season of the F1 Esports Series. He finished his first season in the competition in fourth place and helped secure his team fourth place in the teams' championship.

For the 2020 Formula One Esports Series, Opmeer moved to the Alfa Romeo Orlen Esports Team. He achieved four wins and eight podiums and won the drivers championship by 22 points ahead of rival Frederik Rasmussen.

On 26 January 2021, Opmeer announced that he has signed with the Mercedes Formula One Esports team. On 16 December 2021, Opmeer won the 2021 Formula One Esports Series. He achieved four wins and seven podiums, edging out Frederik Rasmussen by eight points, with Mercedes also winning the teams' championship. At the race of China, Opmeer went from last place to first, calling it his best race ever.

The 2022 season proved to be much more difficult for Opmeer, as his struggles in qualifying heavily affected his race results. However, he won two races back-to-back and finished fifth overall in the championship.

Opmeer began the 2023–24 season by finishing second in Bahrain from P9 on the grid. With continued struggles in qualifying pace, he would only achieve a single win this season, at Silverstone, achieving fourth overall in the drivers championship. After the season, Opmeer left Mercedes.

As a free agent driver, Opmeer signed a multi-year deal with Red Bull Sim Racing on 21 August 2024, joining the 2023–24 drivers' champion Frederik Rasmussen at the team. He won his record-breaking third drivers' title in the 2025 season, winning three races, outscoring Ismael Fahssi by 19 points, with Red Bull also winning the teams' championship.

==== Formula One League Racing ====
Besides competing in the Esports championships, Opmeer also plays the F1 games by doing league races, career modes and open lobbies, which he posts on his YouTube and Twitch channels. The most predominant league is PSGL and Opmeer has also competed in WOR, ORL and Ironman League. He won more than half of the seasons he entered, among them: eight PSGL titles, three WOR titles, two ORL titles and one Ironman League title.

Opmeer went viral at the F1 25 PSGL S40 race at Silverstone when he won by driving through the pit lane. Even though there was no rule against this, Opmeer was still penalised.

=== Formula E: Accelerate ===
In 2021, Opmeer was signed to the Mercedes-EQ Formula E Team to compete in the esport series Formula E: Accelerate. In his first year, he finished fifth overall in the standings, scoring his debut podium for double points in the final round set in Rome.

In the double-header London Open in 2022, Opmeer finished second overall.

== Karting record ==
=== Karting career summary ===
Season	Series	Team	Position
2009	Dutch Championship — Mini Juniors		1st
2010	Dutch Championship — Mini Juniors		1st
2011	Belgian Championship — KF5		15th
2011	Dutch Championship — KF3		1st
2012	Dutch Championship — KF3		4th
2013	German Karting Championship — Junior		12th
2013	CIK-FIA European Championship — KFJ		41st
2014	IAME International Final — X30 Junior		17th
2014	German Karting Championship — Junior	Maddox Racing Team	7th
2014	Rotax Max Wintercup — Rotax Max Junior		31st
2015	German Karting Championship — Senior	Maddox Racing Team	11th
2015	SKUSA SuperNationals — KZ2		39th

== Racing record ==
=== Racing career summary ===
Season	Series	Team	Races	Wins	Poles	F/Laps	Podiums	Points	Position
2016	SMP F4 Championship	MP Motorsport	21	7	4	5	13	264	**2nd**
2016	F4 Spanish Championship	MP Motorsport	6	0	1	0	5	80	NC†
2017	Formula Renault Eurocup	MP Motorsport	23	0	0	0	0	27	15th
2017	Formula Renault 2.0 NEC	MP Motorsport	5	0	0	0	1	68	10th
2018	Formula Renault Eurocup	MP Motorsport	4	0	0	0	0	0	25th
2018	Formula Renault NEC	MP Motorsport	2	0	0	0	0	0	NC†

† – As Opmeer had not competed in the required number of rounds, he was ineligible for a championship position.

=== Complete SMP F4 Championship results ===
(key) (Races in bold indicate pole position) (Races in italics indicate fastest lap)

Year	Team	1	2	3	4	5	6	7	8	9	10	11	12	13	14	15	16	17	18	19	20	Pos	Points
2016	MP Motorsport	SOC; 1; 2	**SOC**; **2**; 1	ZAN1; 1; 3	ZAN1; 2; 1	ZAN1; 3; 1	ZAN2; 1; 1	ZAN2; 2; 1	ZAN2; 3; 3	MSC1; 1; 5	MSC1; 2; 2	MSC1; 3; 3	MSC2; 1; 10	MSC2; 2; 16	MSC2; 3; 2	**AND**; **1**; 5	AND; 2; 9	**AND**; **3**; 12	**AHV**; **1**; 1	AHV; 2; 1	AHV; 3; 4	2nd	270

=== Complete F4 Spanish Championship results ===
(key) (Races in bold indicate pole position) (Races in italics indicate fastest lap)

Year	Team	1	2	3	4	5	6	7	8	9	10	11	12	13	14	15	16	17	18	19	20	Pos	Points
2016	MP Motorsport	NAV; 1; 3	NAV; 2; 3	NAV; 3; 4	**ALC**; **1**; 2	ALC; 2; 3	ALC; 3; 3	ALG; 1	ALG; 2	ALG; 3	VAL; 1	VAL; 2	VAL; 3	CAT; 1	CAT; 2	JAR; 1	JAR; 2	JAR; 3	JER; 1	JER; 2	JER; 3	NC†	0

† – As Opmeer had not competed in the required number of rounds, he was ineligible for a championship position.

=== Complete Formula Renault NEC results ===
(key) (Races in bold indicate pole position) (Races in italics indicate fastest lap)

Year	Entrant	1	2	3	4	5	6	7	8	9	10	11	12	DC	Points
2017	MP Motorsport	MNZ; 1	MNZ; 2	ASS; 1; 4	ASS; 2; 3	NÜR; 1	NÜR; 2	SPA; 1; 11	SPA; 2; 10	SPA; 3; 6	HOC; 1; 7	HOC; 2; 4		10th	68
2018	MP Motorsport	PAU; 1	PAU; 2	MNZ; 1	MNZ; 2	SPA; 1; 12	SPA; 2; 24	HUN; 1	HUN; 2	NÜR; 1	NÜR; 2	HOC; 1	HOC; 2	NC†	0

† As Opmeer was a guest driver, he was ineligible for points

=== Complete Formula Renault Eurocup results ===
(key) (Races in bold indicate pole position) (Races in italics indicate fastest lap)

Year	Team	1	2	3	4	5	6	7	8	9	10	11	12	13	14	15	16	17	18	19	20	21	22	23	Pos	Points
2017	MP Motorsport	MNZ; 1; 18	MNZ; 2; 21	SIL; 1 Ret	SIL; 2; 15	PAU; 1; 11	PAU; 2; 22	MON; 1; 13	MON; 2 Ret	HUN; 1; 8	HUN; 2; 14	HUN; 3; 12	NÜR; 1; 16	NÜR; 2; 16	RBR; 1; 13	RBR; 2 Ret	LEC; 1; 11	LEC; 2; 11	SPA; 1; 11	SPA; 2; 10	SPA; 3; 6	CAT; 1; 16	CAT; 2; 5	CAT; 3; 9	15th	27
2018	MP Motorsport	LEC; 1	LEC; 2	MNZ; 1	MNZ; 2	SIL; 1	SIL; 2	MON; 1	MON; 2	RBR; 1; 18	RBR; 2 Ret	SPA; 1; 12	SPA; 2; 24	HUN; 1	HUN; 2	NÜR; 1	NÜR; 2	HOC; 1	HOC; 2	CAT; 1	CAT; 2				25th	0

== Sim racing record ==
=== Esports career summary ===
Season	Series	Team	Races	Wins	Poles	F/Laps	Podiums	Points	Position
2019	Formula One Esports Series	Renault–Vitality	12	1	1	0	5	123	4th
2020	Formula One Esports Series	Alfa Romeo Racing Orlen Esports Team	12	4	2	0	8	196	**1st**
2021	Formula One Esports Series	Mercedes-AMG Petronas Esports Team	12	4	2	1	7	195	**1st**
2021	Formula E: Accelerate	Mercedes-EQ Formula E Team	6	0	0	0	1	49	5th
2022	Formula One Esports Series	Mercedes-AMG Petronas Esports Team	12	2	0	0	3	122	5th
2022	Formula E: Accelerate	Mercedes-EQ Formula E Team	2	0	0	0	2	33	**2nd**
2023–24	Formula One Sim Racing World Championship	Mercedes-AMG Petronas Esports Team	12	1	0	3	4	122	4th
2025	Formula One Sim Racing World Championship	Oracle Red Bull Sim Racing	12	3	0	2	3	154	**1st**
2026	F1 Sim Racing World Championship	Oracle Red Bull Sim Racing	12	2	0	3	3	114	**3rd**

=== Complete Formula One Esports Series results ===
(key) (Races in bold indicate pole position) (Races in italics indicate fastest lap)

Year	Team	1	2	3	4	5	6	7	8	9	10	11	12	Pos	Points
2019	Renault–Vitality	BHR; 2	CHN; 5	AZE; 14	CAN; 3	AUT; 3	GBR; 10	**GER**; 1	BEL; 3	ITA; 8	JPN; 6	USA; 4	BRA; 12	4th	123
2020	Alfa Romeo Racing Orlen Esports Team	BHR; 1	**VIE**; 3	**CHN**; 1	NED; 2	CAN; 1	AUT; 3	GBR; 9	BEL; 5	ITA; 2	JPN; 4	MEX; 1	BRA; 7	1st	196
2021	Mercedes-AMG Petronas Esports Team	BHR; 4	CHN; 1	**AUT**; 1	GBR; 9	**ITA**; 2	BEL; 2	POR; 7	NED; 6	USA; 1	EMI; 2	MEX; 1	BRA; 4	1st	195
2022	Mercedes-AMG Petronas Esports Team	BHR; 2	EMI; 11	GBR; 5	AUT; 4	BEL; 6	NED; 4	ITA; 18	MEX; 1	USA; 1	JPN; Ret	BRA; 8	UAE; 6	5th	122
2023–24	Mercedes-AMG Petronas Esports Team	BHR; 2	SAU; 7	AUT; Ret	GBR; 1	BEL; 5	NED; 7	USA; 7	MXC; 9	SAP; 3	LVG; 3	QAT; 6	ABU; 6	4th	122
2025	Oracle Red Bull Sim Racing	AUS; 4	CHN; 1	BHR; 12	SAU; 2	GBR; 9	BEL; 6	NLD; 7	USA; 3	MEX; 1	BRA; 1	QAT; 5	ABU; 7	1st	154
2026	Oracle Red Bull Sim Racing	CHN; 4	JPN; 10	BHR; 1	SAU; 1	ESP; 6	GBR; 9	BEL; 9	NLD; 10	USA; 16	MEX; 5	BRA; 5	ABU; 3	3rd	114

=== Complete Formula E: Accelerate results ===
(key) (Races in bold indicate pole position) (Races in italics indicate fastest lap)

Year	Team	1	2	3	4	5	6	Pos	Points
2021	Mercedes-EQ Formula E Team	NYC; 6	HKG; 14	BER; 14	DIR; 10	LES; 5	RME‡ 3	5th	49
2022	Mercedes-EQ Formula E Team	LDN; 3	LDN; 2					2nd	33

=== Complete F1 PC PSGL Tier 1 league racing results ===
(key) (Races in bold indicate pole position) (Races in italics indicate fastest lap) (Points system: 16-12-10-8-6-5-4-3-2-1, FL:+1)

Season	Game	Team	1	2	3	4	5	6	7	8	9	10	11	12	13	14	15	Pos	Points
27/28	F1 2020	Mercedes-AMG Petronas Esports Team	AUT; 2	HUN	SPA	BEL; 2	NED; 1	GBR	ITA	JPN	**FRA**; 1	USA; 3	**MEX**; 1	BHR; 1	ABU; 1	AUS; 3	**BRA**; 3	1st	137
29	F1 2021	Mercedes-AMG Petronas Esports Team	**BHR**; 1	FRA; 2	**BEL**; 1	NED; 13	ITA; C	GBR; 4	AUT; 4	CHN; 1	POR; 5							1st	83
30	F1 2021	Mercedes-AMG Petronas Esports Team	POR; 8	GBR; 4	MON	FRA; 2	HUN; 1	AUT; 1	**SAU**; 1	BEL; 1	**NED**; 1	SIN; 4	USA; 1	BRA; 17	EMI	BHR		1st	125
31	F1 2022	Mercedes-AMG Petronas Esports Team	BHR; 9	USA; 1	AUT	MIA; 3	BEL; 13	MEX; 3	JPN; 2	ITA; 6								3rd	55
32/33	F1 2022	Mercedes-AMG Petronas Esports Team	AUS; 6	SAU	USA; 1	ABU	BRA; 3	SPA; 2	BEL; 8	FRA; 13	MEX	AUT	BHR					5th	46
34	F1 23	Mercedes-AMG Petronas Esports Team	BHR; 4C	USA; 3C	NED; DNS	BRA; 2	HUN	GBR; 2	QAT; 10	AUT; 2	JPN; 2	EMI; 6	BEL; 4	SAU; 2	MEX; 1	ABU; 17		1st	90
35/36	F1 23	Mercedes-AMG Petronas Esports Team	POR; 3	ITA; 2	GBR; 8	CAN; 1	SPA; 15	SAU; 1	**MEX**; 1	BRA; 1	AUT; 1	BEL; 11	USA; 4	LVG; 5				1st	121
37	F1 24	Oracle Red Bull Sim Racing	BHR; 5	GBR; 2	JPN; 1	SAU; 5	BEL; 2	MEX; 8	AUT; 1	**QAT**; 2	LVG; 7	USA; 13	BRA; 8	ABU; 1				1st	109
40	F1 25	Oracle Red Bull Sim Racing	BRA; 2	USA; 2	GBR; 4	NED; 2	JPN; 4	CHN; 3	BEL; 1	**SAU**; 3	QAT; 1	BRA; 8	AUS; 15	MEX; 10	LVG; 5	ABU; 8		1st	118

Notes: S27/28 was the first season PSGL raced on PC. S38, S39 and S41 were held on PlayStation, where Opmeer did not compete in. Opmeer also won S25, which was held on PlayStation. In total he won 27 races, 54 podiums and 7 titles in PSGL on PC, by far most of everyone.
