= 2019 Formula One Esports Series =

Racing eSports Series

Tournament information
- Sport: Formula One Esports Series
- Location: Qualification: Worldwide; Pro Draft: Gfinity Arena; Pro Series: Gfinity Arena
- Dates: 11 September–4 December 2019
- Administrator: Codemasters; Formula One Management; FIA
- Tournament format(s): Qualification: Online; Pro Draft: Driver's selection Pro Series: Twelve race championship
- Venue: Qualification: Worldwide; Pro Draft: Gfinity Arena; Pro Series: Gfinity Arena

Final positions
- Champions: (Italy) David Tonizza (Austria) Red Bull Racing Esports

The 2019 Formula One Esports Series was the third season of the Formula One Esports Series. It started on September 11, 2019 and ended on December 4, 2019. It was held on Formula One's official 2019 game. The championship was held at Gfinity Arena in London, United Kingdom.

In his first season, David Tonizza became the new Formula One Esports Series champion after a long battle with Frederik Rasmussen, becoming the first rookie to win the title. Rasmussen's team, Red Bull Racing Esports, won the Constructor's Championship title for the first time. The season also featured the debut of future champions Jarno Opmeer and Lucas Blakeley, who drove for Renault Sport Team Vitality and Sport Pesa Racing Point F1 Esports Team respectively.

== Format ==
Following the 2018 Formula One Esports Series success, there is no significant changes to the tournament's format.

- Qualification - The season opens with online qualification, a global call for participation. Qualification is open to anyone with a copy of the official Formula 1 video game developed by Codemasters. The fastest gamers get through.
- Pro Draft - Qualifying gamers enter the Pro Draft where the official Formula 1 teams select their drivers to represent them in the F1 Esports Pro Series championships.
- Pro Series - The drivers race in 25-50% races over a series of events that are broadcast live. They earn points for themselves and their F1 teams. These races will determine the F1 New Balance Esports Series Teams’ and Drivers’ World Champions, with a portion of the prize fund distributed to the teams based on their standings.

== Teams and drivers ==
The grid was increased from 9 to 10 teams this season, with Ferrari Driver Academy entering F1 Esports for the first time.

Team	Race drivers		
Team	No.	Driver name	Rounds
(Switzerland) Alfa Romeo Racing F1 Esports	12; 22; 21	(Hungary) Dániel Bereznay (Turkey) Salih Saltunç (Sweden) Kimmy Larsson	All; All; Not Competed
(Italy) Ferrari Driver Academy	46; 69; N.A.	(Italy) David Tonizza (Italy) Amos Laurito (Italy) Gianfranco Giglioli	All; 1–5, 7–8, 10–11; 6, 9, 12
(United States) Haas F1 Team Esports	38; N.A. 98	(Netherlands) Floris Wijers (Germany) Jan Fehler (Czech Republic) Martin Stefanko	All; 1–5, 7–12; 6
(United Kingdom) McLaren Shadow	20; 12; 23	(Netherlands) Bono Huis (Italy) Enzo Bonito (Netherlands) Allert van der Wal	All; All; Not Competed
(Germany) Mercedes-AMG Petronas Esports	72; 95; N.A.	(United Kingdom) Brendon Leigh (Poland) Patryk Krutyj (Australia) Daniel Shields	All; 1–8, 10–11; 9, 12
(Austria) Red Bull Racing Esports	19; 51; 40	(Denmark) Frederik Rasmussen (Finland) Joni Törmälä (France) Nicolas Longuet	All; 1–8, 10–12; 9
(France) Renault Sport Team Vitality	2; 34; 30	(Netherlands) Jarno Opmeer (Germany) Cedric Thomé (Germany) Simon Weigang	All; 1–5, 7–9; 6, 10–12
(United Kingdom) Sport Pesa Racing Point F1 Esports Team	24; 92; 88	(Germany) Marcel Kiefer (Italy) Daniel Haddad (United Kingdom) Lucas Blakeley	1–8; All; 9–12
(Italy) Scuderia Toro Rosso Esports	19; 13; N.A.	(Germany) Patrick Holzmann (Turkey) Cem Bölükbaşı (Italy) Manuel Biancolilla	All; 1–6, 9–11; 7–8, 12
(United Kingdom) Williams Esports	93; 42; N.A.	(Spain) Álvaro Carretón (Finland) Tino Naukkarinen (United Kingdom) Isaac Price	1–8, 10–12; 3–11; 1–2, 9, 12

== Calendar ==
Round	Event	Circuit	Distance	Date	Broadcast
1	Event One	Bahrain International Circuit, Sakhir	14 Laps	11 September	LIVE: F1 Esports Pro Series 2019 Event 1! on YouTube
2	Event One	(China) Shanghai International Circuit, Shanghai	14 Laps	11 September	LIVE: F1 Esports Pro Series 2019 Event 1! on YouTube
3	Event One	(Azerbaijan) Baku City Circuit, Baku	13 Laps	11 September	LIVE: F1 Esports Pro Series 2019 Event 1! on YouTube
4	Event Two	(Canada) Circuit Gilles Villeneuve, Montréal	18 Laps	2 October	LIVE: F1 Esports Pro Series 2019 Event 2! on YouTube
5	Event Two	(Austria) Red Bull Ring, Spielberg	18 Laps	2 October	LIVE: F1 Esports Pro Series 2019 Event 2! on YouTube
6	Event Two	(United Kingdom) Silverstone Circuit, Silverstone	13 Laps	2 October	LIVE: F1 Esports Pro Series 2019 Event 2! on YouTube
7	Event Three	(Germany) Hockenheimring, Hockenheim	17 Laps	6 November	LIVE: F1 Esports Pro Series 2019 Event 3! on YouTube
8	Event Three	(Belgium) Circuit de Spa-Francorchamps, Stavelot	11 Laps	6 November	LIVE: F1 Esports Pro Series 2019 Event 3! on YouTube
9	Event Three	(Italy) Autodromo Nazionale di Monza, Monza	13 Laps	6 November	LIVE: F1 Esports Pro Series 2019 Event 3! on YouTube
10	Grand Finale	(Japan) Suzuka International Racing Course, Suzuka	13 Laps	4 December	LIVE: F1 New Balance Esports Pro Series Grand Final 2019 on YouTube
11	Grand Finale	(United States) Circuit of the Americas, Austin, Texas	14 Laps	4 December	LIVE: F1 New Balance Esports Pro Series Grand Final 2019 on YouTube
12	Grand Finale	(Brazil) Autódromo José Carlos Pace, São Paulo	18 Laps	4 December	LIVE: F1 New Balance Esports Pro Series Grand Final 2019 on YouTube

== Results ==
=== Season summary ===
Round	Circuit	Pole position	Fastest lap	Winning driver	Winning team
1	Bahrain International Circuit, Sakhir	(Denmark) Frederik Ramsussen	(Germany) Jan Fehler	(Italy) David Tonizza	(Italy) Ferrari Driver Academy
2	(China) Shanghai International Circuit, Shanghai	(Hungary) Dániel Bereznay	(Germany) Patrik Holzmann	(Italy) David Tonizza	(Italy) Ferrari Driver Academy
3	(Azerbaijan) Baku City Circuit, Baku	(Denmark) Frederik Rasmussen	(Germany) Patrik Holzmann	(Denmark) Frederik Rasmussen	(Austria) Red Bull Racing Esports Team
4	(Canada) Circuit Gilles Villeneuve, Montréal	(Finland) Tino Naukkarinen	(Denmark) Frederik Rasmussen	(Germany) Cedric Thomé	(France) Renault Sport Team Vitality
5	(Austria) Red Bull Ring, Spielberg	(Italy) David Tonizza	(Finland) Joni Törmälä	(Italy) David Tonizza	(Italy) Ferrari Driver Academy
6	(United Kingdom) Silverstone Circuit, Silverstone	(Italy) David Tonizza	(Finland) Tino Naukkarinen	(Germany) Marcel Kiefer	(United Kingdom) Sport Pesa Racing Point Esports
7	(Germany) Hockenheimring, Hockenheim	(Netherlands) Jarno Opmeer	(Finland) Tino Naukkarinen	(Netherlands) Jarno Opmeer	(France) Renault Sport Team Vitality
8	(Belgium) Circuit de Spa-Francorchamps, Stavelot	(Hungary) Dániel Bereznay	(Germany) Patrik Holzmann	(Hungary) Dániel Bereznay	(Switzerland) Alfa Romeo F1 Esports
9	(Italy) Autodromo Nazionale di Monza, Monza	(Hungary) Dániel Bereznay	(Denmark) Frederik Ramsussen	(Hungary) Dániel Bereznay	(Switzerland) Alfa Romeo F1 Esports
10	(Japan) Suzuka International Racing Course, Suzuka	(Spain) Álvaro Carretón	(Italy) Amos Laurito	(Denmark) Frederik Rasmussen	(Austria) Red Bull Racing Esports Team
11	(United States) Circuit of the Americas, Austin, Texas	(Denmark) Frederik Rasmussen	(Germany) Patrik Holzmann	(Denmark) Frederik Rasmussen	(Austria) Red Bull Racing Esports Team
12	(Brazil) Autódromo José Carlos Pace, São Paulo	(Italy) David Tonizza	(United Kingdom) Isaac Price	(Hungary) Dániel Bereznay	(Switzerland) Alfa Romeo Esports Team

== Championship standings ==
=== Scoring system ===
Points were awarded to the top 10 classified finishers in the race and one point was given to the driver who set the fastest lap inside the top ten. No extra points are awarded to the pole-sitter.

Position	1st	2nd	3rd	4th	5th	6th	7th	8th	9th	10th	FL
Points	25	18	15	12	10	8	6	4	2	1	1

In the event of a tie at the conclusion of the championship, a count-back system is used as a tie-breaker, with a driver's/constructor's best result used to decide the standings.

=== Drivers' Championship standings ===
Pos.	Driver	BHR (Bahrain)	CHN (China)	AZE (Azerbaijan)	CAN (Canada)	AUT (Austria)	GBR (United Kingdom)	GER (Germany)	BEL (Belgium)	ITA (Italy)	JPN (Japan)	USA (United States)	BRA (Brazil)	Points
1	(Italy) David Tonizza	1	1	3	8	1^{P}	5^{P}	3	4	3	4	6	2^{P}	184
2	(Denmark) Frederik Rasmussen	12^{P}	2	1^{P}	4^{F}	2	2	5	2	19^{F}	1	1^{P}	10	171
3	(Hungary) Dániel Bereznay	19	Ret^{P}	7	13	5	3	4	1^{P}	1^{P}	18	5	1	128
4	(Netherlands) Jarno Opmeer	2	5	14	3	3	10	1^{P}	3	8	6	4	12	123
5	(United Kingdom) Brendon Leigh	5	11	4	2	14	6	17	11	6	7	3	11	77
6	(Germany) Marcel Kiefer	4	3	8	14	11	1	8	14					60
7	(Netherlands) Bono Huis	10	6	5	7	7	14	6	5	7	12	8	19	59
8	(Spain) Álvaro Carretón	18	15	6	10	17	4	12	7		5^{P}	7	3	58
9	(Finland) Joni Törmälä	13	10	16	5	20^{F}	7	2	6		8	9	5	57
10	(Turkey) Salih Saltunç	3	4	9	11	10	16	9	9	11	13	9	4	48
11	(Finland) Tino Naukkarinen			2	6^{P}	8	20^{F}	20^{F}	8	4	16	10		47
12	(Italy) Enzo Bonito	6	12	17	16	6	13	18	15	5	9	2	17	46
13	(Germany) Cedric Thomé	11	18	10	1	4		13	12	14				38
14	(Germany) Patrik Holzmann	8	19^{F}	19^{F}	18	12	11	7	20^{F}	10	3	19^{F}	8	30
15	(United Kingdom) Lucas Blakeley									13	2	15	9	20
16	(Italy) Daniele Haddad	7	9	12	12	15	18	14	10	9	15	13	6	19
17	(France) Nicolas Longuet									2				18
18	(Germany) Simon Weigang						8				10	14	7	11
19	(Netherlands) Floris Wijers	9	7	18	17	19	15	15	13	12	19	16	16	8
20	(Poland) Patryk Krutyj	15	8	11	20	9	19	11	18		14	12		6
21	(Turkey) Cem Bölükbaşı	14	13	15	9	18	9			20	11	20		4
22	(Italy) Manuel Biancolilla							10	16				18	1
23	(Czech Republic) Martin Stefanko						12							0
24	(Germany) Jan Fehler	20^{F}	17	Ret	15	13		16	19	18	17	18	14	0
25	(Italy) Amos Laurito	16	16	13	19	16		19	17		20^{F}	17		0
26	(Australia) Daniel Shields									17			13	0
27	(United Kingdom) Isaac Price	17	14							15			20^{F}	0
28	(Italy) Gianfanco Giglioli						17			16			15	0
Pos.	Driver	BHR (Bahrain)	CHN (China)	AZE (Azerbaijan)	CAN (Canada)	AUT (Austria)	GBR (United Kingdom)	GER (Germany)	BEL (Belgium)	ITA (Italy)	JPN (Japan)	USA (United States)	BRA (Brazil)	Points

Key
Colour	Result
Gold	Winner
Silver	Second place
Bronze	Third place
Green	Other points position
Blue	Other classified position
Blue	Not classified, finished (NC)
Purple	Not classified, retired (Ret)
Red	Did not qualify (DNQ)
Red	Did not pre-qualify (DNPQ)
Black	Disqualified (DSQ)
White	Did not start (DNS)
White	Race cancelled (C)
Blank	Did not enter
Annotation	Meaning
P	Pole position
F	Fastest lap

=== Teams' Championship standings ===
Pos.	Team	BHR (Bahrain)	CHN (China)	AZE (Azerbaijan)	CAN (Canada)	AUT (Austria)	GBR (United Kingdom)	GER (Germany)	BEL (Belgium)	ITA (Italy)	JPN (Japan)	USA (United States)	BRA (Brazil)	Points
1	(Austria) Red Bull Racing Esports	12^{P}	2	1^{P}	4^{F}	2	2	2	2	2	1	1^{P}	5	246
1	(Austria) Red Bull Racing Esports	13	10	16	5	20^{F}	7	5	6	19^{F}	8	11	10	246
2	(Italy) Ferrari Driver Academy	1	1	3	8	1^{P}	5^{P}	3	4	3	4	6	2	184
2	(Italy) Ferrari Driver Academy	16	16	13	19	16	17	19	17	16	20^{F}	17	15	184
3	(Switzerland) Alfa Romeo Racing F1 Esports	3	4	7	11	5	3	4	1^{P}	1^{P}	13	5	1	176
3	(Switzerland) Alfa Romeo Racing F1 Esports	19	Ret^{P}	9	13	10	16	9	9	11	18	9	4	176
4	(France) Renault Sport Team Vitality	2	5	10	1	3	8	1^{P}	3	8	6	4	7	172
4	(France) Renault Sport Team Vitality	11	18	14	3	4	10	13	12	14	10	14	12	172
5	(United Kingdom) Williams Esports	17	14	2	6^{P}	8	4	12	7	4	5^{P}	7	3	105
5	(United Kingdom) Williams Esports	18	15	6	10	17	20^{F}	20^{F}	8	15	16	10	20^{F}	105
6	(United Kingdom) McLaren Shadow	8	19	9	7	5	14	2	13	9	6	5	5	105
6	(United Kingdom) McLaren Shadow	13	20	13	18	9	13	20	19	19	19	8	8	105
7	(United Kingdom) Sport Pesa Racing Point F1 Esports Team	4	3	8	12	11	1	8	10	9	2	13	6	99
7	(United Kingdom) Sport Pesa Racing Point F1 Esports Team	7	9	12	14	15	18	14	14	13	15	15	9	99
8	(Germany) Mercedes-AMG Petronas Esports	5	8	4	2	9	6	11	11	6	7	3	11	83
8	(Germany) Mercedes-AMG Petronas Esports	15	11	11	20	14	19	17	18	17	14	12	13	83
9	(Italy) Scuderia Toro Rosso Esports	8	13	15	9	12	9	7	16	10	3	19^{F}	8	35
9	(Italy) Scuderia Toro Rosso Esports	14	19^{F}	19^{F}	18	18	11	10	20^{F}	20	11	20	18	35
10	(United States) Haas F1 Team Esports	9	7	18	15	13	12	15	13	12	17	16	14	8
10	(United States) Haas F1 Team Esports	20^{F}	17	Ret	17	19	15	16	18	18	19	18	16	8
Pos.	Team	BHR (Bahrain)	CHN (China)	AZE (Azerbaijan)	CAN (Canada)	AUT (Austria)	GBR (United Kingdom)	GER (Germany)	BEL (Belgium)	ITA (Italy)	JPN (Japan)	USA (United States)	BRA (Brazil)	Points

Key
Colour	Result
Gold	Winner
Silver	Second place
Bronze	Third place
Green	Other points position
Blue	Other classified position
Blue	Not classified, finished (NC)
Purple	Not classified, retired (Ret)
Red	Did not qualify (DNQ)
Red	Did not pre-qualify (DNPQ)
Black	Disqualified (DSQ)
White	Did not start (DNS)
White	Race cancelled (C)
Blank	Did not enter
Annotation	Meaning
P	Pole position
F	Fastest lap

Notes:

- The standings are sorted by best result, rows are not related to the drivers. In case of tie on points, the best positions achieved determined the outcome.
