= F1 2018 (video game) =

2018 video game

- Cover art featuring Aston Martin Red Bull Racing's Max Verstappen, Mercedes-AMG Petronas Motorsport's Lewis Hamilton and Scuderia Ferrari's Sebastian Vettel
- Developer: Codemasters Birmingham
- Publishers: Codemasters; Deep Silver (retail)
- Composers: Miktek; James Kneen; Brian Tyler
- Series: F1
- Engine: EGO Engine 4.0
- Platforms: Microsoft Windows; PlayStation 4 Xbox One
- Release: 24 August 2018
- Genre: Racing
- Modes: Single-player, multiplayer

F1 2018 is the official video game of the 2018 Formula One World Championship developed and published by Codemasters. The game includes all twenty-one circuits from the calendar, and all twenty drivers and ten teams competing in the season. It was released on 24 August for Microsoft Windows, PlayStation 4 and Xbox One.

== Features ==
F1 2018 features substantial revisions to its "Career Mode" compared to previous systems. F1 2017 introduced a detailed progression system that allowed the player to focus on developing the engine, chassis and aerodynamics of their car. This was simplified in F1 2018 as Codemasters' research demonstrated that players were losing interest in the game before completing the car's development cycle.

Players develop their cars by spending "development points", which are earned by meeting research and development targets during free practice sessions. Codemasters have introduced a wider range of free practice programs to the game in a bid to extend the game's longevity. At the halfway point of each championship, the player has the option of ending their development cycle and banking all future development points for the next championship. This function has a renewed importance in F1 2018 as teams are subject to rule changes at the end of each championship which can potentially compromise the car's performance.

As with previous titles, F1 2018 includes "Classic Cars", these being Formula One cars from previous seasons. The game includes much older cars dating back to the 1970s, such as the 1972 Lotus 72D, which took Emerson Fittipaldi to his first world championship, the McLaren M23 and the Ferrari 312T, which were driven by James Hunt and Niki Lauda during the 1976 championship; the special edition includes the Brawn BGP 001, the car which Jenson Button and Brawn GP won the 2009 World Drivers' and World Constructors' Championships; and the Williams FW25, the car with which Juan Pablo Montoya finished third in the 2003 championship. All of the Classic Cars that were featured in F1 2017 are included in F1 2018.

As the game is based on the 2018 championship, the Circuit Paul Ricard made its debut in the series. The Hockenheimring, which was last featured in F1 2016, made its return to the game. Also due to 2018 regulations, the halo makes its debut in the F1 games. F1's official theme song, composed by Brian Tyler, also makes its debut in the F1 games in certain parts, such as the game's intro cinematic (2nd gameplay trailer), as well as the pre-race and post-race scenes.

The game also features an online multiplayer mode. There are different leagues that require the player to get an obligatory number of trophies to reach. The player can win or lose trophies depending on their performances on these online races. Actions such as cutting corners or colliding with other cars have a negative effect on the player's "Safety Rating". This rates players based on their overall cleanliness in a similar way to the Super License system for real Formula 1 drivers.

== Development ==
Following widespread criticism of a qualifying format used in the opening rounds of the 2016 championship, the Fédération Internationale de l'Automobile (FIA) and commercial rights holder Liberty Media announced plans to trial regulation changes through the Formula One eSports Series, which debuted in 2017 with the release of the F1 2017 video game.

== Reception ==
Reception

Aggregate score
Aggregator	Score
Metacritic	PC: 83/100; PS4: 84/100; XONE: 84/100

Review scores
Publication	Score
Game Informer	8.75/10
GamesMaster	87%
GameSpot	9/10
IGN	8.5/10
Jeuxvideo.com	17/20

F1 2018 was the bestselling game in the United Kingdom during its first week on sale. In Japan, the PlayStation 4 version sold 5,517 copies during its first week of release. It was also the bestselling physical retail game across Europe, the Middle East and Africa throughout the week beginning on August 26, 2018, and the second-best selling digital game throughout the same week. The game has received positive reviews from critics alike.

=== Accolades ===
Year	Award	Category	Result	Ref.
2018	Game Critics Awards	Best Racing Game	Nominated	
2018	Gamescom Awards	Best Racing Game	Nominated	
2018	Gamescom Awards	Best Simulation Game	Nominated	
2018	Gamescom Awards	Best Sports Game	Nominated	
2018	Titanium Awards	Best Sports/Driving Game	Nominated	
2019	D.I.C.E. Awards	Racing Game of the Year	Nominated	
2019	National Academy of Video Game Trade Reviewers Awards	Game, Franchise Racing	Nominated	
2019	Italian Video Game Awards	People's Choice	Nominated	
2019	Develop:Star Awards	Best Use of Game Engine	Nominated	

== Censorship ==
- Williams' Martini & Rossi red color has been replaced with blue stripes.
