= 2023 Race of Champions =

Annual edition of motorsport event

The 2023 Race of Champions was the 32nd running of the Race of Champions, taking place on 28 and 29 January. The race took place in Sweden for the second time in its history, taking place at Pite Havsbad in Piteå, Sweden, 60 miles south of the Arctic Circle, on a circuit of snow and ice on the frozen Baltic Sea.

The race was won by Team Norway (Oliver and Petter Solberg), which marked the team's second consecutive victory.

== Participants ==
=== Nations Cup ===
Nations' Cup Team	Drivers	2023 series
France	Sébastien Loeb	World Rally-Raid Championship
France	Adrien Tambay	FIA ETCR – eTouring Car World Cup
Germany	Sebastian Vettel	none
Germany	Mick Schumacher	Formula One (Note: Reserve Driver for Mercedes.)
Finland	Mika Häkkinen	none
Finland	Valtteri Bottas	Formula One
Norway	Oliver Solberg (Note: Oliver Solberg is Swedish but competed under the Norwegian Flag for the Nations Cup)	World Rally Championship-2
Norway	Petter Solberg	none
Sweden	Johan Kristoffersson	Extreme E
Sweden	Mattias Ekström	Extreme E
Nordic	(Denmark) Tom Kristensen	none
Nordic	(Sweden) Felix Rosenqvist	IndyCar
United Kingdom	Jamie Chadwick	Indy NXT
United Kingdom	David Coulthard	none
United States	Tanner Foust	Extreme E
United States	Travis Pastrana	Nitro RallyCross
All Stars	(Brazil) Felipe Drugovich	Formula One (Note: Reserve Driver for Aston Martin.)
All Stars	(Belgium) Thierry Neuville	World Rally Championship
eROC	(United Kingdom) Lucas Blakeley	Formula One eSports Series
eROC	(Netherlands) Jarno Opmeer	Formula One eSports Series

== Winners ==
Race of Champions		Nations' Cup Winners				Other Trophies
Winner	Runner-up	Nation (winners)	Winning drivers	Nation (runner-up)	Runner up Drivers	Other Trophies
(Sweden) Mattias Ekström	(Germany) Mick Schumacher	Norway	Petter Solberg; Oliver Solberg	All Stars	(Brazil) Felipe Drugovich (Belgium) Thierry Neuville	(United Kingdom) Lucas Blakeley (eROC)

== Draw ==
=== Drivers ===
The Champion of Champions winner was decided by a knockout tournament, split into two halves - one (upper half) consisting of international racing drivers with the other being the rally experts and 'those with more experience of off-road driving'. All rounds were the best of 2 heats, with the final being the best of 3 heats.

==== Preliminary round ====
Preliminaries
(France) Adrien Tambay	1^{[a]}
(United Kingdom) David Coulthard	1
(Sweden) Felix Rosenqvist	0
(Germany) Mick Schumacher	2

1/8 Final
(France) Adrien Tambay	0
(Germany) Mick Schumacher	2

- ^a Tambay wins on combined time, 6.840s faster

==== Main Draw ====
1/8 Finals
(Finland) Mika Häkkinen	0
(Brazil) Felipe Drugovich	2
(France) Adrien Tambay	0
(Germany) Mick Schumacher	2
(Finland) Valtteri Bottas	0
(Denmark) Tom Kristensen	2
(Germany) Sebastian Vettel	2
(United Kingdom) Jamie Chadwick	0
(France) Sébastien Loeb	1
(Belgium) Thierry Neuville	1^{[a]}
(Norway) Petter Solberg	0
(Sweden) Oliver Solberg	2
(Sweden) Johan Kristoffersson	2
(United States) Tanner Foust	0
(United States) Travis Pastrana	0
(Sweden) Mattias Ekström	2

Quarter-Finals
(Brazil) Felipe Drugovich	1
(Germany) Mick Schumacher	1^{[b]}
(Denmark) Tom Kristensen	0
(Germany) Sebastian Vettel	2
(Belgium) Thierry Neuville	1^{[c]}
(Sweden) Oliver Solberg	1
(Sweden) Johan Kristoffersson	0
(Sweden) Mattias Ekström	2

Semi-Finals
(Germany) Mick Schumacher	2
(Germany) Sebastian Vettel	0
(Belgium) Thierry Neuville	0
(Sweden) Mattias Ekström	2

Final
(Germany) Mick Schumacher	0
(Sweden) Mattias Ekström	2

- ^a Neuville wins on combined time, 0.040s faster
- ^b Schumacher wins on combined time, 1.527s faster
- ^c Neuville wins on combined time, 9.597s faster
