= 2026 F1 Sim Racing World Championship =

Racing eSports Series

Tournament information
- Game: F1 25
- Location: Event 1: Birmingham; Events 2–4: Biggin Hill
- Dates: 27 March 2026–28 May 2026
- Administrator: Codemasters; EA Sports; Formula One Management

Final positions
- Champions: (Wales) Otis Lawrence (Austria) Oracle Red Bull Sim Racing

The 2026 F1 Sim Racing World Championship is an esports competition for Formula One which is the ninth season of the Formula One Esports Series and the third to be named as the "Formula One Sim Racing World Championship." It is being held on Formula One's official 2025 game, featuring nine of the eleven teams from the real-life sport, with Audi and Cadillac opting not to participate. (Note: Audi is the replacement of Sauber for 2026; the F1 25 game did not have proper representation of Audi and Cadillac at the time, as the 2026 season DLC had not been released at the time.) The championship started on 27 March 2026 and ends on 28 May 2026.

Jarno Opmeer and Oracle Red Bull Sim Racing enter the season as the defending champions, having both won their third titles in the 2025 campaign.

== Format ==
The drivers race in a series of four LAN events that are broadcast live. They earn points for themselves and their teams, following the official F1 points system, plus a bonus point being given for pole position and another for the driver who set the fastest lap in the top 10. These points determine the F1 Sim Racing World Championship Teams’ and Drivers’ World Champions, with a total $750,000 prize fund.

=== Prize pool ===
A prize fund of $750,000 is awarded to the teams at the end of the season. This differs from previous seasons in which a portion of the prize fund was awarded to the drivers ($100,000 in 2025), this year the entire fund is awarded to the teams.

==== Teams' Championship ====
Position	1st	2nd	3rd	4th	5th	6th	7th	8th	9th
Winnings	$127,777	$107,777	$92,777	$82,777	$77,777	$72,777	$67,777	$62,777	$57,777

=== Coverage ===
The series is broadcast live on Formula One's official YouTube, Twitch, and Facebook channels, as well as Event 1 being open to the public to watch at DreamHack Birmingham.

== Entries ==
Team	Race drivers		
Team	No.	Driver name	Rounds
(France) Alpine Sim Racing	15	(Hungary) Dani Bereznay	1–4, 6–7, 9–12
(France) Alpine Sim Racing	45	(Wales) Otis Lawrence	All
(France) Alpine Sim Racing	51	(United Kingdom) Josh Idowu	5, 8
(United Kingdom) Aston Martin Aramco Esports	26	(Netherlands) Duncan Hofland	1, 3–4, 6, 8–10, 12
(United Kingdom) Aston Martin Aramco Esports	88	(Czech Republic) Jan Haladej	2, 5, 7, 11
(United Kingdom) Aston Martin Aramco Esports	93	(Spain) Rubén Pedreño	All
(United Kingdom) McLaren F1 Sim Racing	25	(United Kingdom) Jake Benham	All
(United Kingdom) McLaren F1 Sim Racing	41	(United Kingdom) Alfie Butcher	All
(United Kingdom) McLaren F1 Sim Racing	42	(United Kingdom) Wilson Hughes	–
(Germany) Mercedes-AMG PETRONAS Esports	11	(Austria) Julian Klaffenböck	1–4, 6–7, 9–10
(Germany) Mercedes-AMG PETRONAS Esports	39	(Netherlands) Thomas Ronhaar	All
(Germany) Mercedes-AMG PETRONAS Esports	74	(Netherlands) Tycho Hardy	5, 8, 11–12
(United States) TGR Haas F1 Sim Racing	34	(Hungary) Tamás Gál	1–8, 10–12
(United States) TGR Haas F1 Sim Racing	36	(Netherlands) Joris Croezen	All
(United States) TGR Haas F1 Sim Racing	71	(Hungary) Gábor Csontos	9
(Austria) Oracle Red Bull Sim Racing	13	(United Kingdom) Sebastian Job	–
(Austria) Oracle Red Bull Sim Racing	67	(Denmark) Frederik Rasmussen	All
(Austria) Oracle Red Bull Sim Racing	89	(Netherlands) Jarno Opmeer	All
(Italy) Racing Bulls F1 Sim Racing	2	(United Kingdom) Tom Manley	1–8, 10–11
(Italy) Racing Bulls F1 Sim Racing	51	(Finland) Joni Törmälä	2, 5, 8–9, 11–12
(Italy) Racing Bulls F1 Sim Racing	95	(Turkey) Ulaş Özyıldırım	1, 3–4, 6–7, 9–10, 12
(Italy) Scuderia Ferrari HP Esports	32	(United Kingdom) John Evans	1–6
(Italy) Scuderia Ferrari HP Esports	54	(Spain) Ismael Fahssi	All
(Italy) Scuderia Ferrari HP Esports	77	(Iran) Bari Broumand	7–12
(United Kingdom) Atlassian Williams F1 Team Gaming	21	(Spain) Álvaro Carretón	2, 6, 8–9, 11
(United Kingdom) Atlassian Williams F1 Team Gaming	40	(France) Nicolas Longuet	All
(United Kingdom) Atlassian Williams F1 Team Gaming	62	(Hungary) István Puki	1, 3–5, 7, 10, 12

== Calendar ==
The full schedule was announced on 19 March, consisting of twelve races across four separate events.

Round	Circuit	Distance	Date	Event
1	(China) Shanghai International Circuit, Shanghai	28 laps	27 March 2026	Event One
2	(Japan) Suzuka Circuit, Suzuka	27 laps	28 March 2026	Event One
3	Bahrain International Circuit, Sakhir	29 laps	29 March 2026	Event One
4	(Saudi Arabia) Jeddah Corniche Circuit, Jeddah	25 laps	22 April 2026	Event Two
5	(Spain) Circuit de Barcelona-Catalunya, Montmeló	33 laps	23 April 2026	Event Two
6	(United Kingdom) Silverstone Circuit, Silverstone	26 laps	23 April 2026	Event Two
7	(Belgium) Circuit de Spa-Francorchamps, Stavelot	22 laps	13 May 2026	Event Three
8	(Netherlands) Circuit Zandvoort, Zandvoort	36 laps	14 May 2026	Event Three
9	(United States) Circuit of the Americas, Austin, Texas	28 laps	14 May 2026	Event Three
10	Autódromo Hermanos Rodríguez, Mexico City	36 laps	27 May 2026	Event Four
11	(Brazil) Interlagos Circuit, São Paulo	36 laps	28 May 2026	Event Four
12	(United Arab Emirates) Yas Marina Circuit, Abu Dhabi	29 laps	28 May 2026	Event Four

=== Calendar changes ===
Suzuka Circuit and Circuit de Barcelona-Catalunya replaced the Albert Park Street Circuit and Lusail International Circuit from the 2025 calendar, with Suzuka returning after two seasons away from the calendar, while Barcelona made its first appearance in F1 Sim Racing.

== Results ==
=== Season summary ===
Round	Circuit	Pole position	Fastest lap	Winning driver	Winning team
1	(China) Shanghai International Circuit, Shanghai	(Denmark) Frederik Rasmussen	(Hungary) Dani Bereznay	(Denmark) Frederik Rasmussen	(Austria) Oracle Red Bull Sim Racing
2	(Japan) Suzuka Circuit, Suzuka	(Denmark) Frederik Rasmussen	(Netherlands) Jarno Opmeer	(Wales) Otis Lawrence	(France) Alpine Sim Racing
3	Bahrain International Circuit, Sakhir	(Spain) Ismael Fahssi	(Netherlands) Jarno Opmeer	(Netherlands) Jarno Opmeer	(Austria) Oracle Red Bull Sim Racing
4	(Saudi Arabia) Jeddah Corniche Circuit, Jeddah	(Wales) Otis Lawrence	(United Kingdom) Alfie Butcher	(Netherlands) Jarno Opmeer	(Austria) Oracle Red Bull Sim Racing
5	(Spain) Circuit de Barcelona-Catalunya, Montmeló	(Wales) Otis Lawrence	(Wales) Otis Lawrence	(Spain) Ismael Fahssi	(Italy) Scuderia Ferrari HP Esports
6	(United Kingdom) Silverstone Circuit, Silverstone	(Wales) Otis Lawrence	(Hungary) Dani Bereznay	(Wales) Otis Lawrence	(France) Alpine Sim Racing
7	(Belgium) Circuit de Spa-Francorchamps, Stavelot	(Turkey) Ulaş Özyıldırım	(Iran) Bari Broumand	(Turkey) Ulaş Özyıldırım	(Italy) Racing Bulls F1 Sim Racing
8	(Netherlands) Circuit Zandvoort, Zandvoort	(Denmark) Frederik Rasmussen	(United Kingdom) Jake Benham	(Iran) Bari Broumand	(Italy) Scuderia Ferrari HP Esports
9	(United States) Circuit of the Americas, Austin, Texas	(France) Nicolas Longuet	(Denmark) Frederik Rasmussen	(Wales) Otis Lawrence	(France) Alpine Sim Racing
10	Autódromo Hermanos Rodríguez, Mexico City	(Turkey) Ulaş Özyıldırım	(Netherlands) Jarno Opmeer	(Spain) Ismael Fahssi	(Italy) Scuderia Ferrari HP Esports
11	(Brazil) Interlagos Circuit, São Paulo	(Wales) Otis Lawrence	(France) Nicolas Longuet	(Spain) Ismael Fahssi	(Italy) Scuderia Ferrari HP Esports
12	(United Arab Emirates) Yas Marina Circuit, Abu Dhabi	(Denmark) Frederik Rasmussen	(Netherlands) Thomas Ronhaar	(Spain) Ismael Fahssi	(Italy) Scuderia Ferrari HP Esports

== Season report ==
=== Event One (March 27–29) ===
Event One of the 2026 F1 Sim Racing World Championship went underway in Shanghai, with Fredrick Rasmussen taking the first pole position of this season. The latter then converted pole position for a race win. Soon enough, the digital race in Japan had Rasmussen in pole for two consecutive times, but Alpine's Otis Lawrence took the win.

== Championship standings ==
=== Scoring system ===
Points will be awarded to the top 10 classified finishers in the race and one point will be given to the driver who sets the fastest lap inside the top ten. One extra point will be awarded to the pole-sitter.

Position	1st	2nd	3rd	4th	5th	6th	7th	8th	9th	10th	Pole Position	Fastest Lap
Points	25	18	15	12	10	8	6	4	2	1	1	1

In the event of a tie at the conclusion of the championship, a count-back system is used as a tie-breaker, with a driver's/team's best result used to decide the standings.

=== Drivers' Championship standings ===
Pos.	Driver	CHN (China)	JPN (Japan)	BHR (Bahrain)	SAU (Saudi Arabia)	ESP (Spain)	GBR (United Kingdom)	BEL (Belgium)	NED (Netherlands)	USA (United States)	MXC (Mexico)	SAP (Brazil)	ABU (United Arab Emirates)	Points
1	(Wales) Otis Lawrence	7	1	8	2^{P}	16^{P}	1^{P}	4	5	1	9	3^{P}	5	156
2	(Spain) Ismael Fahssi	6	2	10^{P}	Ret	1	7	7	8	5	1	1	1	154
3	(Netherlands) Jarno Opmeer	4	10^{F}	1^{F}	1	6	9	9	10	16	5^{F}	5	3	114
4	(Denmark) Frederik Rasmussen	1^{P}	15^{P}	7	14	3^{F}	3	3	2^{P}	8^{F}	10	6	17^{P}	113
5	(France) Nicolas Longuet	8	4	2	4	4	18	16	4	3^{P}	15	10^{F}	4	100
6	(United Kingdom) Alfie Butcher	3	7	Ret	10^{F}	5	6^{F}	10	6	9	2	7	9	79
7	(Turkey) Ulaş Özyıldırım	2		13	3		4	1^{P}		10	18^{P}		15	73
8	(Iran) Bari Broumand							8^{F}	1	7	8	2	6	66
9	(Spain) Rubén Pedreño	16	6	3	12	13	17	13	3	11	3	13	10^{F}	55
10	(Netherlands) Thomas Ronhaar	11	13	4	11	7	2	17	18	6	6	9	13	54
11	(Hungary) Dani Bereznay	10^{F}	5	12	5		12	5		2	14	12	18	50
12	(United Kingdom) Jake Benham	12	3	9	16	8	16	15	7^{F}	15	13	18	2	46
13	(Netherlands) Joris Croezen	5	8	5	9	15	8	14	12	12	11	8	7	40
14	(Netherlands) Duncan Hofland	9		15	13		11		9	4	4		8	32
15	(United Kingdom) Tom Manley	13	17	Ret	6	10	13	2	16		17	17		27
16	(Spain) Álvaro Carretón		Ret				5		11	14		4		22
17	(Hungary) István Puki	Ret		6	15	17		6			7		16	22
18	(Wales) Josh Idowu					2			17					18
19	(Austria) Julian Klaffenböck	14	16	11	7		10	18		18	12			7
20	(Hungary) Tamás Gál	17	14	14	8	12	15	11	15		16	15	11	4
21	(Finland) Joni Törmälä		11			9			13	13		11	12	2
22	(Czech Republic) Jan Haladej		9			18		12				14		2
23	(United Kingdom) John Evans	15	12	Ret	Ret	11	14							0
24	(Netherlands) Tycho Hardy					14			14			16	14	0
25	(Hungary) Gábor Csontos									17				0
Pos.	Driver	CHN (China)	JPN (Japan)	BHR (Bahrain)	SAU (Saudi Arabia)	ESP (Spain)	GBR (United Kingdom)	BEL (Belgium)	NED (Netherlands)	USA (United States)	MXC (Mexico)	SAP (Brazil)	ABU (United Arab Emirates)	Points

Key
Colour	Result
Gold	Winner
Silver	Second place
Bronze	Third place
Green	Other points position
Blue	Other classified position
Blue	Not classified, finished (NC)
Purple	Not classified, retired (Ret)
Red	Did not qualify (DNQ)
Red	Did not pre-qualify (DNPQ)
Black	Disqualified (DSQ)
White	Did not start (DNS)
White	Race cancelled (C)
Blank	Did not enter
Annotation	Meaning
P	Pole position
F	Fastest lap

=== Teams' Championship standings ===
Pos.	Team	CHN (China)	JPN (Japan)	BHR (Bahrain)	SAU (Saudi Arabia)	ESP (Spain)	GBR (United Kingdom)	BEL (Belgium)	NED (Netherlands)	USA (United States)	MXC (Mexico)	SAP (Brazil)	ABU (United Arab Emirates)	Points
1	(Austria) Oracle Red Bull Sim Racing	1^{P}	10^{F}	1^{F}	1	3^{F}	3	3	2^{P}	8^{F}	5^{F}	5	3	227
1	(Austria) Oracle Red Bull Sim Racing	4	15^{P}	7	14	6	9	9	10	16	10	6	17^{P}	227
2	(France) Alpine Sim Racing	7	1	8	2^{P}	2	1^{P}	4	5	1	9	3^{P}	5	224
2	(France) Alpine Sim Racing	10^{F}	5	12	5	16^{P}	12	5	17	2	14	12	18	224
3	(Italy) Scuderia Ferrari HP Esports	6	2	10^{P}	Ret	1	7	7	1	5	1	1	1	220
3	(Italy) Scuderia Ferrari HP Esports	15	12	Ret	Ret	11	14	8^{F}	8	7	8	2	6	220
4	(United Kingdom) Atlassian Williams F1 Team Gaming	8	4	2	4	4	5	6	4	3^{P}	7	4	4	144
4	(United Kingdom) Atlassian Williams F1 Team Gaming	Ret	Ret	6	15	17	18	16	11	14	15	10^{F}	16	144
5	(United Kingdom) McLaren F1 Sim Racing	3	3	9	10^{F}	5	6^{F}	10	6	9	2	7	2	125
5	(United Kingdom) McLaren F1 Sim Racing	12	7	Ret	16	8	16	15	7^{F}	15	13	18	9	125
6	(Italy) Racing Bulls F1 Sim Racing	2	11	13	3	9	4	1^{P}	13	10	17	11	12	102
6	(Italy) Racing Bulls F1 Sim Racing	13	Ret	Ret	6	10	13	2	16	13	18^{P}	17	15	102
7	(United Kingdom) Aston Martin Aramco Esports	9	6	3	12	13	11	12	3	4	3	13	8	89
7	(United Kingdom) Aston Martin Aramco Esports	16	9	15	13	18	17	13	9	11	4	14	10^{F}	89
8	(Germany) Mercedes-AMG PETRONAS Esports	11	13	4	7	7	2	17	14	6	6	9	13	61
8	(Germany) Mercedes-AMG PETRONAS Esports	15	Ret	11	11	14	10	18	18	18	12	16	14	61
9	(United States) TGR Haas F1 Sim Racing	5	8	5	8	12	8	11	12	12	11	8	7	44
9	(United States) TGR Haas F1 Sim Racing	17	14	14	9	15	15	14	15	17	16	15	11	44
Pos.	Team	CHN (China)	JPN (Japan)	BHR (Bahrain)	SAU (Saudi Arabia)	ESP (Spain)	GBR (United Kingdom)	BEL (Belgium)	NED (Netherlands)	USA (United States)	MXC (Mexico)	SAP (Brazil)	ABU (United Arab Emirates)	Points
