= 2022 Race of Champions =

Motorsport competition

The 2022 Race of Champions was the 31st running of the Race of Champions. It took place on 5–6 February 2022 at Pite Havsbad in Piteå, Sweden, 60 miles south of the Arctic Circle.

== Participants ==
=== Nations Cup ===
Nations' Cup Team	Drivers	2022 Series
Germany	Sebastian Vettel	Formula One
Germany	Mick Schumacher	Formula One
Finland	Mika Häkkinen	none
Finland	Emma Kimiläinen	W Series
Latin America	(Brazil) Helio Castroneves	IndyCar Series / IMSA SportsCar Championship
Latin America	(Mexico) Benito Guerra Jr.	none
United States	Jimmie Johnson	IndyCar Series / IMSA SportsCar Championship
United States	Colton Herta	IndyCar Series / IMSA SportsCar Championship
France	Sébastien Loeb	World Rally Championship / Extreme E / Deutsche Tourenwagen Masters
France	Didier Auriol	none
Nordic	(Sweden) Johan Kristoffersson	FIA World Rallycross Championship / Extreme E
Nordic	(Denmark) Tom Kristensen	none
Norway	Petter Solberg	none
Norway	Oliver Solberg (Note: Oliver Solberg is Swedish but competed under the Norwegian Flag for the Nations Cup)	World Rally Championship
Sim Racing All Stars	(Netherlands) Jarno Opmeer	Formula One eSports Series
Sim Racing All Stars	(United Kingdom) Lucas Blakeley	Formula One eSports Series
Sweden	Timmy Hansen	FIA World Rallycross Championship / Extreme E
Sweden	Mattias Ekström	FIA ETCR – eTouring Car World Cup
United Kingdom	David Coulthard	none
United Kingdom	Jamie Chadwick	W Series

=== Celebrity Race ===
All participants use Porsche 718 Cayman GT4 Clubsport.

Driver
(Sweden) Jonas Björkman
(Sweden) Ingemar Stenmark
(Sweden) Anja Pärson
(Norway) Aksel Lund Svindal

== Winners ==
Race of Champions		Nations' Cup Winners				Other Trophies
Winner	Runner-up	Nation (winners)	Winning drivers	Nation (runner-up)	Runner up Drivers	Other Trophies
(France) Sébastien Loeb	(Germany) Sebastian Vettel	Norway	Petter Solberg; Oliver Solberg	United States	Jimmie Johnson; Colton Herta	(Netherlands) Jarno Opmeer (eROC)

== Draw ==
=== Drivers ===
The Champion of Champions winner was decided by a knockout tournament, split into two halves - one (upper half) consisting of international racing drivers with the other being the rally experts and 'those with more experience of off-road driving'. The preliminary rounds and 1/8 finals were decided by a single heat, with the Quarter-finals being decided by 2 heats, the best overall time as a tie-breaker. The Semi-finals were the best of 3 heats, and the Final was the best of 5.

==== Preliminary Round ====
Preliminaries
(United States) Colton Herta	1
(Brazil) Helio Castroneves	0
(United Kingdom) Jamie Chadwick	1
(Germany) Mick Schumacher	0

1/8 Final
(United States) Colton Herta	1
(United Kingdom) Jamie Chadwick	0

==== Main Draw ====
1/8 Finals
(United States) Colton Herta	1
(United Kingdom) Jamie Chadwick	0
(Germany) Sebastian Vettel	1
(Finland) Emma Kimiläinen	0
(United States) Jimmie Johnson	1
(Finland) Mika Häkkinen	0
(Denmark) Tom Kristensen	1
(United Kingdom) David Coulthard	0
(Mexico) Benito Guerra Jr.	0
(Sweden) Oliver Solberg	1
(France) Sébastien Loeb	1
(Norway) Petter Solberg	0
(Sweden) Johan Kristoffersson	1
(Sweden) Timmy Hansen	0
(France) Didier Auriol	0
(Sweden) Mattias Ekström	1

Quarter-finals
(United States) Colton Herta	1
(Germany) Sebastian Vettel	1^{[a]}
(United States) Jimmie Johnson	1
(Denmark) Tom Kristensen	1^{[b]}
(Sweden) Oliver Solberg	0
(France) Sébastien Loeb	1^{[c]}
(Sweden) Johan Kristoffersson	1
(Sweden) Mattias Ekström	1^{[d]}

Semi-finals
(Germany) Sebastian Vettel	2
(Denmark) Tom Kristensen	0
(France) Sébastien Loeb	2
(Sweden) Mattias Ekström	1

Final
(Germany) Sebastian Vettel	1
(France) Sébastien Loeb	3

- ^a Vettel wins on combined time, 0.354s faster
- ^b Kristensen wins on combined time, 0.606s faster
- ^c heat 2 was a dead heat, both drivers finishing in 1:37.505
- ^d Ekström wins on combined time, 0.483s faster
- Sources: ROC Article Official Video

=== Nations ===
The Nations' Cup was also decided in a knockout format, with each race being decided by 4 heats, with each driver racing against both drivers from the other team. If the match ended 2-2, the total race time was considered to decide a winner. The final round was a simple best-of-five match, with the winner crowned after reaching 3 heat wins.

==== Preliminary Round ====
Preliminaries
(United States) Team USA	2^{[a]}
(Brazil) (Mexico) Team Latin America	2
Team Germany	3
Team eROC All Stars	1

Quarter-final
(United States) Team USA	2^{[b]}
Team Germany	2

==== Main Draw ====
Quarter-finals
USA	2^{[b]}
Germany	2
Finland	2^{[c]}
Great Britain	2
Nordic	3
France	1
Sweden	1
Norway	3

Semi-finals
USA	3
Finland	1
Nordic	2
Norway	2^{[d]}

Final
USA	1
Norway	3

- ^a USA win on combined time, 3.093s faster
- ^b USA win on combined time, 1.195s faster
- ^c Finland win on combined time, 5.040s faster
- ^d Norway win on combined time, 2.882s faster
- Sources: ROC article, official video

== Cars ==
Manufacturer	Model	Image
Polaris	RZR	Polaris RZR XP Turbo ProStar
Porsche	718 Cayman GT4 Clubsport	
Olsbergs MSE	Supercar Lites	
Olsbergs MSE	RX2e	
Olsbergs MSE	FC1-X	
