= 2025 F1 Sim Racing World Championship =

Racing eSports Series

Tournament information
- Sport: F1 Sim Racing
- Location: Stockholm, Sweden
- Dates: 14 January 2025–27 March 2025
- Administrator: Codemasters; EA Sports; Formula One Management

Final positions
- Champions: (Netherlands) Jarno Opmeer (Austria) Oracle Red Bull Sim Racing

The 2025 Formula One Sim Racing World Championship was an esports competition for Formula One which was the eighth season of the Formula One Esports Series and the second in the series to be named as the "Formula One Sim Racing World Championship." It was held on Formula One's official 2024 game, featuring all ten teams from the real-life sport. The championship started on 14 January 2025 and ended on 27 March 2025.

Frederik Rasmussen of Oracle Red Bull Sim Racing entered the year as the defending World Driver's Champion, while Scuderia Ferrari Esports were the defending World Constructors' Champions. Red Bull would take back the Constructors' Champions crown for this season, with their newly recruited Jarno Opmeer winning his record third championship in F1 Esports history. Ismael Fahssi would come up second to Opmeer, while Bari Broumand finished third.

== Format ==
The drivers raced in a series of 3 LAN events that were broadcast live. Like the actual Formula One regulations, drivers must make one pit stop if the weather is dry, and are not obligated to do so if it is wet. They earn points for themselves and their teams. These points determined the F1 Sim Racing World Championship Teams’ and Drivers’ World Champions, with a total $750,000 prize fund.

=== Prize pool ===
A prize fund of $750,000 was awarded to the teams and drivers at the end of the season.

==== Constructors' Championship ====
$650,000 of the total $750,000 is awarded to the teams.

Position	1st	2nd	3rd	4th	5th	6th	7th	8th	9th	10th
Winnings	$130k	$105k	$85k	$70k	$60k	$50k	$45k	$40k	$35k	$30k

==== Drivers' Championship ====
$100,000 of the total $750,000 is awarded to the drivers. Drivers who finish the championship below 5th place do not take home any proportion of the fund.

Position	1st	2nd	3rd	4th	5th
Winnings	$50k	$25k	$12.5k	$7.5k	$5k

=== Coverage ===
The series was broadcast on Formula One's YouTube channel with commentary from lead commentator Alex Jacques and former Formula One driver Jolyon Palmer, with Ariana Bravo as presenter and pit lane reporter, with analysis from Tom Deacon and Matt Gallagher.

== Entries ==
Team	Race drivers			
Team	setup pos.	No.	Driver name	Rounds
(France) Alpine Sim Racing	R	84	(Finland) Joni Törmälä	1–8, 10–12
(France) Alpine Sim Racing	L	52	(United Kingdom) Josh Idowu	All
(France) Alpine Sim Racing	N/A	51	(Poland) Piotr Stachulec (Event 1 & 2)	N/A
(France) Alpine Sim Racing	R	37	(Hungary) Bence Szabo-Konyi (Event 3)	9
(United Kingdom) Aston Martin Aramco F1 Esports Team	R	45	(Wales) Otis Lawrence	All
(United Kingdom) Aston Martin Aramco F1 Esports Team	L	8	(Chile) Fabrizio Donoso	1, 4–5, 7, 10,12
(United Kingdom) Aston Martin Aramco F1 Esports Team	L	26	(Netherlands) Duncan Hofland	2–3, 6, 8–9, 11
(Switzerland) KICK F1 Sim Racing Team	R	39	(Netherlands) Thomas Ronhaar	All
(Switzerland) KICK F1 Sim Racing Team	L	72	(United Kingdom) Brendon Leigh	1–9, 12
(Switzerland) KICK F1 Sim Racing Team	L	74	(Netherlands) Tycho Hardy	10–11
(United Kingdom) McLaren Shadow	R	41	(United Kingdom) Alfie Butcher	All
(United Kingdom) McLaren Shadow	L	88	(United Kingdom) Lucas Blakeley	All
(United Kingdom) McLaren Shadow	N/A	12	(United Kingdom) Wilson Hughes	N/A
(Germany) Mercedes-AMG Petronas Esports Team	R	15	(Hungary) Daniel Bereznay	1–6, 8–12
(Germany) Mercedes-AMG Petronas Esports Team	L	62	(Hungary) István Puki	1–3, 6–9
(Germany) Mercedes-AMG Petronas Esports Team	Both	25	(United Kingdom) Jake Benham	4–5, 7, 10–12
(United States) MoneyGram Haas F1 Sim Racing Team	R	36	(Netherlands) Joris Croezen	1–6, 8–10
(United States) MoneyGram Haas F1 Sim Racing Team	L	34	(Hungary) Tamás Gál	All
(United States) MoneyGram Haas F1 Sim Racing Team	R	79	(United Kingdom) Shanaka Clay	7, 11–12
(Austria) Oracle Red Bull Sim Racing	R	19	(Denmark) Frederik Rasmussen	All
(Austria) Oracle Red Bull Sim Racing	L	5	(Netherlands) Jarno Opmeer	All
(Austria) Oracle Red Bull Sim Racing	N/A	13	(United Kingdom) Sebastian Job	N/A
(Italy) Racing Bulls F1 Sim Racing Team	R	6	(United Kingdom) Tom Manley	All
(Italy) Racing Bulls F1 Sim Racing Team	L	95	(Turkey) Ulaş Özyıldırım	2–3, 5–6, 8–10, 12
(Italy) Racing Bulls F1 Sim Racing Team	L	98	(United Kingdom) Declan Barrett	1, 4, 7, 11
(Italy) Scuderia Ferrari HP Esports Team	R	40	(France) Nicolas Longuet	All
(Italy) Scuderia Ferrari HP Esports Team	L	7	(Iran) Bari Broumand	All
(Italy) Scuderia Ferrari HP Esports Team	N/A	32	(United Kingdom) John Evans	N/A
(United Kingdom) Atlassian Williams Sim Racing	R	54	(Spain) Ismael Fahssi	All
(United Kingdom) Atlassian Williams Sim Racing	L	9	(Spain) Álvaro Carretón	1–2, 4–6, 8–10, 12
(United Kingdom) Atlassian Williams Sim Racing	L	93	(Spain) Rubén Pedreño	3, 7, 11

Notes:

- Rows are related to the position of the sim racing cockpit the drivers play on. Each team has two setups side by side, R means the Right side, the L the Left side simulator setup.

== Calendar ==
The full schedule was announced on 19 December, consisting of twelve races across three separate events.

Round	Circuit	Distance	Date	Broadcast	Event
1	(Australia) Albert Park Street Circuit, Melbourne	29 laps	14 January 2025	LIVE Race: 2025 F1 Sim Racing World Championship - Round 1: Australia on YouTube	Event One
2	(China) Shanghai International Circuit, Shanghai	29 laps	15 January 2025	LIVE Race: 2025 F1 Sim Racing World Championship - Round 2: China on YouTube	Event One
3	Bahrain International Circuit, Sakhir	29 laps	15 January 2025	LIVE Race: 2025 F1 Sim Racing World Championship - Round 3: Bahrain on YouTube	Event One
4	(Saudi Arabia) Jeddah Corniche Circuit, Jeddah	25 laps	16 January 2025	LIVE Race: 2025 F1 Sim Racing World Championship - Round 4: Saudi Arabia on YouTube	Event One
5	(United Kingdom) Silverstone Circuit, Silverstone	26 Laps	11 February 2025	LIVE Race: 2025 F1 Sim Racing World Championship - Round 5: Great Britain on YouTube	Event Two
6	(Belgium) Circuit de Spa-Francorchamps, Stavelot	22 Laps	12 February 2025	LIVE Race: 2025 F1 Sim Racing World Championship - Round 6: Belgium on YouTube	Event Two
7	(Netherlands) Circuit Zandvoort, Zandvoort	36 Laps	12 February 2025	LIVE Race: 2025 F1 Sim Racing World Championship - Round 7: The Netherlands on YouTube	Event Two
8	(United States) Circuit of the Americas, Austin, Texas	28 laps	13 February 2025	LIVE Race: 2025 F1 Sim Racing World Championship - Round 8: USA on YouTube	Event Two
9	Autódromo Hermanos Rodríguez, Mexico City	36 laps	25 March 2025	LIVE Race: 2025 F1 Sim Racing World Championship - Round 9: Mexico on YouTube	Event Three
10	(Brazil) Interlagos Circuit, São Paulo	36 laps	26 March 2025	LIVE Race: 2025 F1 Sim Racing World Championship - Round 10: Brazil on YouTube	Event Three
11	(Qatar) Losail International Circuit, Lusail	29 laps	26 March 2025	LIVE Race: 2025 F1 Sim Racing World Championship - Round 11: Qatar on YouTube	Event Three
12	(United Arab Emirates) Yas Marina Circuit, Abu Dhabi	29 laps	27 March 2025	LIVE Race: 2025 F1 Sim Racing World Championship - Round 12: Abu Dhabi on YouTube	Event Three

=== Calendar changes ===
The Albert Park Street Circuit returned as the season opener for the first time since the 2018 season, and the Shanghai International Circuit will host a round for the first time since the 2021 season as the second round. The Red Bull Ring and the Las Vegas Strip Circuit dropped off the calendar in return.

== Results ==
=== Season summary ===
Round	Circuit	Pole position	Fastest lap	Winning driver	Winning team
1	(Australia) Albert Park Street Circuit, Melbourne	(Spain) Ismael Fahssi	(Netherlands) Jarno Opmeer	(Spain) Ismael Fahssi	(United Kingdom) Williams Esports
2	(China) Shanghai International Circuit, Shanghai	(Turkey) Ulaş Özyıldırım	(Finland) Joni Törmälä	(Netherlands) Jarno Opmeer	(Austria) Oracle Red Bull Sim Racing
3	Bahrain International Circuit, Sakhir	(Spain) Ismael Fahssi	(United Kingdom) Alfie Butcher	(Iran) Bari Broumand	(Italy) Scuderia Ferrari HP Esports Team
4	(Saudi Arabia) Jeddah Corniche Circuit, Jeddah*	(Spain) Ismael Fahssi	(Netherlands) Jarno Opmeer	(Wales) Otis Lawrence	(United Kingdom) Aston Martin Aramco F1 Esports Team
5	(United Kingdom) Silverstone Circuit, Silverstone	(Denmark) Frederik Rasmussen	(United Kingdom) Tom Manley	(Denmark) Frederik Rasmussen	(Austria) Oracle Red Bull Sim Racing
6	(Belgium) Circuit de Spa-Francorchamps, Stavelot	(Netherlands) Thomas Ronhaar	(Hungary) István Puki	(United Kingdom) Alfie Butcher	(United Kingdom) McLaren Shadow
7	(Netherlands) Circuit Zandvoort, Zandvoort	(Iran) Bari Broumand	(France) Nicolas Longuet	(Iran) Bari Broumand	(Italy) Scuderia Ferrari HP Esports Team
8	(United States) Circuit of the Americas, Austin, Texas	(Wales) Otis Lawrence	(Spain) Ismael Fahssi	(Netherlands) Thomas Ronhaar	(Switzerland) KICK F1 Sim Racing Team
9	Autódromo Hermanos Rodríguez, Mexico City	(Netherlands) Thomas Ronhaar	(United Kingdom) Lucas Blakeley	(Netherlands) Jarno Opmeer	(Austria) Oracle Red Bull Sim Racing
10	(Brazil) Interlagos Circuit, São Paulo	(Netherlands) Thomas Ronhaar	(Denmark) Frederik Rasmussen	(Netherlands) Jarno Opmeer	(Austria) Oracle Red Bull Sim Racing
11	(Qatar) Lusail International Circuit, Lusail	(Iran) Bari Broumand	(United Kingdom) Lucas Blakeley	(Iran) Bari Broumand	(Italy) Scuderia Ferrari HP Esports Team
12	(United Arab Emirates) Yas Marina Circuit, Abu Dhabi	(Netherlands) Thomas Ronhaar	(United Kingdom) Tom Manley	(Wales) Otis Lawrence	(United Kingdom) Aston Martin Aramco F1 Esports Team

== Season report ==
=== Event One ===
The championship started at the Australian Grand Prix, where Ismael Fahssi of Williams took his first career pole position. At the start, he held onto the lead until defending champion Frederik Rasmussen snatched it from him on lap 7, leaving Fahssi pressured by runner-up Thomas Ronhaar and rookie Otis Lawrence, both driving for Kick F1 and Aston Martin respectively. When the round of pit stops came, the top four were all surmounted by Daniel Bereznay, who went on an alternative strategy. Towards the latter stages, Lawrence pushed Rasmussen wide at turn 5, who was then pushed by Lucas Blakeley at turn 8, shoving him down to only tenth at the race end. On the final lap, Fahssi overtook Bereznay, and Ronhaar attempted a divebomb on him, which resulted in both of them dropping down the order. Fahssi took his first victory in the series from István Puki and Bereznay. Jarno Opmeer finished fourth in his first outing for Red Bull Racing, followed by Lawrence and Ronhaar.

Ulaş Özyıldırım was the next pole sitter at the Chinese Grand Prix, making his debut for Racing Bulls. During the first half, he became involved in a battle with Ronhaar, Lawrence, and Brendon Leigh, in which he eventually lost out and dropped to thirteenth. His teammate, Tom Manley, collided with Leigh after the round of pit stops, also removing Leigh from contention and instead making room for Jarno Opmeer to chase after Ronhaar. Opmeer came out on top for his first win of the season, followed by Ronhaar, Bereznay, and Fahssi in fourth.

== Championship standings ==
=== Scoring system ===
Points will be awarded to the top 10 classified finishers in the race and one point will be given to the driver who sets the fastest lap inside the top ten. One extra point will be awarded to the pole-sitter.

Position	1st	2nd	3rd	4th	5th	6th	7th	8th	9th	10th	Pole position	FL
Points	25	18	15	12	10	8	6	4	2	1	1	1

In the event of a tie at the conclusion of the championship, a count-back system is used as a tie-breaker, with a driver's/team's best result used to decide the standings.

=== Drivers' Championship standings ===
Pos.	Driver	AUS (Australia)	CHN (China)	BHR (Bahrain)	SAU (Saudi Arabia)	GBR (United Kingdom)	BEL (Belgium)	NED (Netherlands)	USA (United States)	MXC (Mexico)	SAP (Brazil)	QAT (Qatar)	ABU (United Arab Emirates)	Points
1	(Netherlands) Jarno Opmeer	4^{F}	1	11	2^{F}	9	6	7	3	1	1	5	7	154
2	(Spain) Ismael Fahssi	1^{P}	4	3^{P}	5^{P}	12	17	2	6^{F}	7	4	3	5	135
3	(Iran) Bari Broumand	17	Ret	1	13	7	15	1^{P}	2	2	12	1^{P}	3	134
4	(Netherlands) Thomas Ronhaar	7	2	6	9	6	3^{P}	3	1	17^{P}	3^{P}	4	16^{P}	128
5	(Wales) Otis Lawrence	5	6	8	1	8	9	13	5^{P}	3	14	8	1	108
6	(United Kingdom) Alfie Butcher	6	5	7^{F}	4	11	1	10	20	8	6	13	2	93
7	(Denmark) Frederik Rasmussen	10	11	18	Ret	1^{P}	7	8	4	4	2^{F}	6	9	90
8	(France) Nicolas Longuet	19	7	13	7	4	12	5^{F}	9	6	9	2	6	73
9	(Hungary) Dani Bereznay	3	3	9	Ret	2	5		8	14	10		8	69
10	(Hungary) István Puki	2	8	2			2^{F}	17	12	16		7		65
11	(United Kingdom) Jake Benham				3	3		4			5	15	4	64
12	(United Kingdom) Tom Manley	8	Ret	4	6	10^{F}	4	9	10	5	11	14	10^{F}	53
13	(Spain) Álvaro Carretón	9	13		8	14	Ret		7	12	7		Ret	18
14	(Finland) Joni Törmälä	20	10^{F}	10	Ret	16	16	6	16		8	17	11	15
15	(United Kingdom) Lucas Blakeley	15	12	16	12	5	18	20	11	10^{F}	16	10^{F}	12	14
16	(United Kingdom) Josh Idowu	16	9	5	Ret	20	11	16	18	Ret	15	19	15	12
17	(Netherlands) Duncan Hofland		18	15			13		13	9		12		2
18	(United Kingdom) Shanaka Clay							19				9	17	2
19	(Hungary) Tamás Gál	13	17	19	10	19	14	11	19	13	18	18	14	1
20	(United Kingdom) Brendon Leigh	14	16	12	Ret	18	10	18	15	18			18	1
21	(Spain) Rubén Pedreño			14				12				11		0
22	(Turkey) Ulaş Özyıldırım		14^{P}	Ret		13	8		14	DSQ	20		Ret	0 (Note: Ulaş Özyıldırım was disqualified at Mexico, received a qualifying ban, and docked of all championship points (5) for unsportsmanlike behaviour.)
23	(Netherlands) Joris Croezen	12	15	17	11	15	19		17	11	13			0
24	(United Kingdom) Declan Barrett	11			Ret			15				16		0
25	(Chile) Fabrizio Donoso	18			Ret	17		14			17		13	0
26	(Hungary) Bence Szabo-Konyi									15				0
27	(Netherlands) Tycho Hardy										19	DSQ		-3 (Note: Tycho Hardy was disqualified at Qatar, and received a 3 point deduction for unsportsmanlike behaviour.)
Pos.	Driver	AUS (Australia)	CHN (China)	BHR (Bahrain)	SAU (Saudi Arabia)	GBR (United Kingdom)	BEL (Belgium)	NED (Netherlands)	USA (United States)	MXC (Mexico)	SAP (Brazil)	QAT (Qatar)	ABU (United Arab Emirates)	Points

Key
Colour	Result
Gold	Winner
Silver	Second place
Bronze	Third place
Green	Other points position
Blue	Other classified position
Blue	Not classified, finished (NC)
Purple	Not classified, retired (Ret)
Red	Did not qualify (DNQ)
Red	Did not pre-qualify (DNPQ)
Black	Disqualified (DSQ)
White	Did not start (DNS)
White	Race cancelled (C)
Blank	Did not enter
Annotation	Meaning
P	Pole position
F	Fastest lap

=== Teams' Championship standings ===
Pos.	Team	AUS (Australia)	CHN (China)	BHR (Bahrain)	SAU (Saudi Arabia)	GBR (United Kingdom)	BEL (Belgium)	NED (Netherlands)	USA (United States)	MXC (Mexico)	SAP (Brazil)	QAT (Qatar)	ABU (United Arab Emirates)	Points
1	(Austria) Oracle Red Bull Sim Racing	10	11	18	Ret	1^{P}	7	8	4	4	2^{F}	6	9	244
1	(Austria) Oracle Red Bull Sim Racing	4^{F}	1	11	2^{F}	9	6	7	3	1	1	5	7	244
2	(Italy) Scuderia Ferrari HP Esports Team	19	7	13	7	4	12	5^{F}	9	2	12	2	6	207
2	(Italy) Scuderia Ferrari HP Esports Team	17	Ret	1	13	7	15	1^{P}	2	6	9	1^{P}	3	207
3	(Germany) Mercedes-AMG Petronas Esports Team	3	3	9	Ret	2	5	4	8	14	10	7	8	198
3	(Germany) Mercedes-AMG Petronas Esports Team	2	8	2	3	3	2^{F}	17	12	16	5	15	4	198
4	(United Kingdom) Atlassian Williams Sim Racing	1^{P}	4	3^{P}	5^{P}	12	17	2	6^{F}	7	4	3	5	153
4	(United Kingdom) Atlassian Williams Sim Racing	9	13	14	8	14	Ret	12	7	12	7	11	Ret	153
5	(Switzerland) KICK F1 Sim Racing Team	7	2	6	9	6	3^{P}	3	1	17^{P}	3^{P}	4	16^{P}	126
5	(Switzerland) KICK F1 Sim Racing Team	14	16	12	Ret	18	10	18	15	18	19	DSQ	18	126
6	(United Kingdom) Aston Martin Aramco F1 Esports Team	5	6	8	1	8	9	13	5^{P}	3	14	8	1	110
6	(United Kingdom) Aston Martin Aramco F1 Esports Team	18	18	15	Ret	17	13	14	13	9	17	12	13	110
7	(United Kingdom) McLaren Shadow	6	5	7^{F}	4	11	1	10	20	8	6	13	2	107
7	(United Kingdom) McLaren Shadow	15	12	16	12	5	18	20	11	10^{F}	16	10^{F}	12	107
8	(Italy) Racing Bulls F1 Sim Racing Team	8	Ret	4	6	10^{F}	4	9	10	5	11	14	10^{F}	53
8	(Italy) Racing Bulls F1 Sim Racing Team	11	14^{P}	Ret	Ret	13	8	15	14	DSQ	20	16	Ret	53
9	(France) Alpine Sim Racing	20	10^{F}	10	Ret	16	16	6	16	15	8	17	11	27
9	(France) Alpine Sim Racing	16	9	5	Ret	20	11	16	18	Ret	15	19	15	27
10	(United States) MoneyGram Haas F1 Sim Racing Team	13	17	19	10	19	14	11	19	11	13	9	17	3
10	(United States) MoneyGram Haas F1 Sim Racing Team	12	15	17	11	15	19	19	17	13	18	18	14	3
Pos.	Team	AUS (Australia)	CHN (China)	BHR (Bahrain)	SAU (Saudi Arabia)	GBR (United Kingdom)	BEL (Belgium)	NED (Netherlands)	USA (United States)	MXC (Mexico)	SAP (Brazil)	QAT (Qatar)	ABU (United Arab Emirates)	Points
