= 2020 Formula One Esports Series =

Racing eSports Series

Tournament information
- Sport: Formula One Esports Series
- Location: Qualification: Worldwide; Pro Draft: Online; Pro Series: Online
- Dates: 14 October–17 December 2020
- Administrator: Codemasters; Formula One Management; FIA
- Tournament format(s): Qualification: Online; Pro Draft: Driver's selection Pro Series: Twelve race championship
- Venue: Qualification: Worldwide; Pro Draft: Online; Pro Series: Online

Final positions
- Champions: (Netherlands) Jarno Opmeer (Austria) Red Bull Racing Esports

The 2020 Formula One Esports Series was the fourth season of the Formula One Esports Series. It took place from October 14 to December 17, 2020. It was held on Formula One's official 2020 game. As a response to the COVID-19 pandemic the championship had no fixed venue, and was instead held online and streamed on F1's official YouTube channel.

David Tonizza and Red Bull Racing Esports entered the season as the reigning Drivers' and Teams' champions respectively. Red Bull Racing Esports successfully defended the Teams' Championship title for the second consecutive year, while Jarno Opmeer won the Drivers' Championship title for the first time, driving for Alfa Romeo Racing Orlen Esports.

== Format ==
- Qualification - The season opens with online qualification, a global call for participation. Qualification is open to anyone with a copy of the official Formula 1 video game developed by Codemasters. The fastest gamers get through.
- Pro Draft - Qualifying gamers enter the Pro Draft where the official Formula 1 teams select their drivers to represent them in the F1 Esports Pro Series championships.
- Pro Series - The drivers race in 35% races over a series of events that are broadcast live. They earn points for themselves and their F1 teams. These races will determine the F1 New Balance Esports Series Teams’ and Drivers’ World Champions, with a portion of the prize fund distributed to the teams based on their standings.

== Teams and drivers ==
| Team | Race drivers | | |
| Team | No. | Driver name | Rounds |
|---|---|---|---|
| (Switzerland) Alfa Romeo Racing Orlen Esports | 12; 34; N.A. | (Hungary) Dániel Bereznay (Netherlands) Jarno Opmeer (Austria) Dominik Hofmann | All; All; Not Competed |
| (Italy) AlphaTauri Esports Team | 51; 14; 19 | (Finland) Joni Törmälä (Italy) Manuel Biancolilla (Germany) Patrik Holzmann | All; All; Not Competed |
| (United Kingdom) BWT Racing Point Esports Team | 9; 92; 42 | (United Kingdom) Lucas Blakeley (Italy) Daniele Haddad (United Kingdom) Shanaka Clay | 1–8, 10–12; 1–3, 5–6, 8–12; 4, 7, 9 |
| (Italy) FDA Hublot Esports Team | 95; 74; 83 | (Italy) David Tonizza (Italy) Enzo Bonito (Slovakia) Filip Prešnajder | All; 1–7, 9–12; 8 |
| (United States) Haas F1 Esports | 38; 2; 30 | (Germany) Simon Weigang (Germany) Cedric Thomé (Netherlands) Floris Wijers | All; 1–6, 8–12; 7 |
| (United Kingdom) McLaren Shadow | 25; 28; N.A. | (Spain) Dani Moreno (United Kingdom) James Baldwin (France) Matthias Cologon | All; 1–5, 7–12; 6 |
| (Germany) Mercedes AMG Petronas Esports Team | 72; 94; 20 | (United Kingdom) Brendon Leigh (Netherlands) Bono Huis (Iran) Bari Broumand | All; 1–2, 4–12; 3 |
| (Austria) Red Bull Racing Esports | 19; 24; N.A. | (Denmark) Frederik Rasmussen (Germany) Marcel Kiefer (Finland) Tino Naukkarinen | All; All; Not Competed |
| (France) Renault Vitality | 40; 27; N.A. | (France) Nicolas Longuet (Chile) Fabrizio Donoso (Netherlands) Casper Jansen | All; 1–10, 12; 11 |
| (United Kingdom) Williams Esports | 21; 88; 53 | (Spain) Álvaro Carretón (Turkey) Salih Saltunç (Greece) Michael Romanidis | 1–4, 6–12; 1, 3, 5–7, 12; 2, 4–5, 8–11 |

== Calendar ==
| Round | Event | Circuit | Distance | Date | Broadcast |
|---|---|---|---|---|---|
| 1 | Event One | Bahrain International Circuit, Sakhir | 20 Laps | 14 October | F1 Esports Pro Series 2020: Rounds 1 & 2 LIVE! on YouTube |
| 2 | Event One | (Vietnam) Hanoi Street Circuit, Hanoi | 19 Laps | 14 October | F1 Esports Pro Series 2020: Rounds 1 & 2 LIVE! on YouTube |
| 3 | Event One | (China) Shanghai International Circuit, Shanghai | 20 Laps | 15 October | F1 Esports Pro Series 2020: Rounds 3 on YouTube |
| 4 | Event Two | (Netherlands) Circuit Zandvoort, Zandvoort | 25 Laps | 4 November | F1 Esports Pro Series 2020: Rounds 4 & 5 LIVE! on YouTube |
| 5 | Event Two | (Canada) Circuit Gilles Villeneuve, Montreal | 25 Laps | 4 November | F1 Esports Pro Series 2020: Rounds 4 & 5 LIVE! on YouTube |
| 6 | Event Two | (Austria) Red Bull Ring, Spielberg | 25 Laps | 5 November | F1 Esports Pro Series 2020: Rounds 6 on YouTube |
| 7 | Event Three | (United Kingdom) Silverstone Circuit, Silverstone | 18 Laps | 18 November | F1 Esports Pro Series 2020: Rounds 7 & 8 LIVE! on YouTube |
| 8 | Event Three | (Belgium) Circuit de Spa-Francorchamps, Stavelot | 15 Laps | 18 November | F1 Esports Pro Series 2020: Rounds 7 & 8 LIVE! on YouTube |
| 9 | Event Three | (Italy) Autodromo Nazionale di Monza, Monza | 19 Laps | 19 November | F1 Esports Pro Series 2020: Rounds 9 on YouTube |
| 10 | Grand Finale | (Japan) Suzuka International Racing Course, Suzuka | 19 Laps | 16 December | F1 Esports Pro Series 2020: GRAND FINAL, Rounds 10 & 11 LIVE! on YouTube |
| 11 | Grand Finale | Autódromo Hermanos Rodríguez, Mexico City | 25 Laps | 16 December | F1 Esports Pro Series 2020: GRAND FINAL, Rounds 10 & 11 LIVE! on YouTube |
| 12 | Grand Finale | (Brazil) Autódromo José Carlos Pace, São Paulo | 25 Laps | 17 December | F1 Esports Pro Series 2020: FINAL RACE, Rounds 12 on YouTube |

== Results ==
=== Season summary ===
| Round | Circuit | Pole position | Fastest lap | Winning driver | Winning team |
|---|---|---|---|---|---|
| 1 | Bahrain International Circuit, Sakhir | (France) Nicolas Longuet | (Italy) David Tonizza | (Netherlands) Jarno Opmeer | (Switzerland) Alfa Romeo Racing Orlen Esports |
| 2 | Hanoi Street Circuit, Hanoi, Vietnam | (Netherlands) Jarno Opmeer | (United Kingdom) Lucas Blakeley | (Italy) David Tonizza | (Italy) FDA Hublot Esports Team |
| 3 | (China) Shanghai International Circuit, Shanghai | (Netherlands) Jarno Opmeer | (France) Nicolas Longuet | (Netherlands) Jarno Opmeer | (Switzerland) Alfa Romeo Racing Orlen Esports |
| 4 | (Netherlands) Circuit Zandvoort, Zandvoort | (Denmark) Frederik Rasmussen | (Germany) Cedric Thomé | (Denmark) Frederik Rasmussen | (Austria) Red Bull Racing Esports |
| 5 | (Canada) Circuit Gilles Villeneuve, Montréal | (Italy) David Tonizza | (United Kingdom) Brendon Leigh | (Netherlands) Jarno Opmeer | (Switzerland) Alfa Romeo Racing Orlen Esports |
| 6 | (Austria) Red Bull Ring, Spielberg | (Spain) Álvaro Carretón | (Finland) Joni Törmälä | (Germany) Marcel Kiefer | (Austria) Red Bull Racing Esports |
| 7 | (United Kingdom) Silverstone Circuit, Silverstone | (Denmark) Frederik Rasmussen | (United Kingdom) James Baldwin | (France) Nicolas Longuet | (France) Renault Vitality |
| 8 | (Belgium) Circuit de Spa-Francorchamps, Stavelot | (Denmark) Frederik Rasmussen | (United Kingdom) James Baldwin | (Denmark) Frederik Rasmussen | (Austria) Red Bull Racing Esports |
| 9 | (Italy) Autodromo Nazionale di Monza, Monza | (Italy) David Tonizza | (Germany) Simon Weigang | (Italy) David Tonizza | (Italy) FDA Hublot Esports Team |
| 10 | (Japan) Suzuka International Racing Course, Suzuka | (Denmark) Frederik Rasmussen | (Spain) Álvaro Carretón | (Denmark) Frederik Rasmussen | (Austria) Red Bull Racing Esports |
| 11 | Autódromo Hermanos Rodríguez, Mexico City | (Denmark) Frederik Rasmussen | (France) Nicolas Longuet | (Netherlands) Jarno Opmeer | (Switzerland) Alfa Romeo Racing Orlen Esports |
| 12 | (Brazil) Autódromo José Carlos Pace, São Paulo | (France) Nicolas Longuet | (Finland) Joni Törmälä | (France) Nicolas Longuet | (France) Renault Vitality |

== Championship standings ==
=== Scoring system ===
Points were awarded to the top 10 classified finishers in the race and one point was given to the driver who set the fastest lap inside the top ten. No extra points are awarded to the pole-sitter.

| Position | 1st | 2nd | 3rd | 4th | 5th | 6th | 7th | 8th | 9th | 10th | FL |
| Points | 25 | 18 | 15 | 12 | 10 | 8 | 6 | 4 | 2 | 1 | 1 |

In the event of a tie at the conclusion of the championship, a count-back system is used as a tie-breaker, with a driver's/constructor's best result used to decide the standings.

=== Drivers' Championship standings ===
| Pos. | Driver | BHR (Bahrain) | VIE (Vietnam) | CHN (China) | NED (Netherlands) | CAN (Canada) | AUT (Austria) | GBR (United Kingdom) | BEL (Belgium) | ITA (Italy) | JPN (Japan) | MEX (Mexico) | BRA (Brazil) | Points |
|---|---|---|---|---|---|---|---|---|---|---|---|---|---|---|
| 1 | (Netherlands) Jarno Opmeer | 1 | 3^{P} | 1^{P} | 2 | 1 | 3 | 9 | 5 | 2 | 4 | 1 | 7 | 196 |
| 2 | (Denmark) Frederik Rasmussen | 6 | 5 | 5 | 1^{P} | 2 | 2 | 6^{P} | 1^{P} | 4 | 1^{P} | 3^{P} | 11 | 174 |
| 3 | (Germany) Marcel Kiefer | 3 | 6 | 2 | 3 | 3 | 1 | 7 | 3 | 8 | 5 | 6 | 2 | 157 |
| 4 | (France) Nicolas Longuet | 5^{P} | 2 | 15^{F} | 5 | 4 | 5 | 1 | 9 | 10 | 2 | 13^{F} | 1^{P} | 131 |
| 5 | (Hungary) Dániel Bereznay | 2 | 15 | 3 | 12 | 8 | 12 | 3 | 2 | 16 | 9 | 4 | 3 | 99 |
| 6 | (United Kingdom) Brendon Leigh | 7 | 4 | 17 | 6 | 17^{F} | 13 | 10 | 4 | 3 | 15 | 2 | 4 | 84 |
| 7 | (Italy) David Tonizza | 20^{F} | 1 | 19 | 11 | Ret^{P} | 10 | 5 | 8 | 1^{P} | 7 | Ret | 6 | 79 |
| 8 | (Spain) Dani Moreno | 8 | 19 | 9 | 7 | 5 | 14 | 2 | 13 | 9 | 6 | 5 | 5 | 70 |
| 9 | (Spain) Álvaro Carretón | 9 | 12 | 4 | 9 | | 4^{P} | 17 | 18 | 6 | 20^{F} | 9 | 13 | 38 |
| 10 | (Finland) Joni Törmälä | 4 | 9 | 7 | 4 | 10 | 19^{F} | 13 | 15 | 11 | 10 | 17 | 20^{F} | 34 |
| 11 | (Germany) Simon Weigang | 18 | 16 | 14 | 17 | Ret | 6 | 4 | 6 | 20^{F} | 18 | 7 | 12 | 34 |
| 12 | (Netherlands) Bono Huis | 11 | 13 | | 8 | 16 | 8 | 12 | 7 | 7 | 11 | 10 | 9 | 23 |
| 13 | (Italy) Enzo Bonito | 14 | 7 | 20 | 10 | 11 | 11 | 8 | | 5 | 14 | 11 | 19 | 21 |
| 14 | (Italy) Daniele Haddad | 16 | 10 | 16 | | 15 | 9 | | 14 | 13 | 3 | 15 | 16 | 18 |
| 15 | (United Kingdom) Lucas Blakeley | 10 | 17^{F} | 6 | 14 | 13 | 7 | 11 | 20 | | 13 | 12 | 15 | 15 |
| 16 | (Italy) Manuel Biancolilla | 12 | 14 | 18 | Ret | 6 | 20 | 19 | 16 | 18 | 8 | 18 | 17 | 12 |
| 17 | (United Kingdom) James Baldwin | 13 | 20 | 13 | 18 | 9 | | 20^{F} | 19^{F} | 19 | 19 | 8 | 8 | 10 |
| 18 | (Greece) Michael Romanidis | | 11 | | 15 | 7 | | | 10 | 12 | 12 | 16 | | 7 |
| 19 | (Chile) Fabrizio Donoso | 19 | 8 | 10 | 13 | 12 | 17 | 18 | 12 | 17 | 16 | | 18 | 5 |
| 20 | (Germany) Cedric Thomé | 17 | 18 | 8 | 19^{F} | 18 | 18 | | 17 | 14 | 17 | 14 | 10 | 5 |
| 21 | (Iran) Bari Broumand | | | 11 | | | | | | | | | | 0 |
| 21 | (Slovakia) Filip Prešnajder | | | | | | | | 11 | | | | | 0 |
| 23 | (Turkey) Salih Saltunç | 15 | | 12 | | 14 | 16 | 15 | | | | | 14 | 0 |
| 24 | (Netherlands) Floris Wijers | | | | | | | 14 | | | | | | 0 |
| 25 | (United Kingdom) Shanaka Clay | | | | 16 | | | 16 | | 15 | | | | 0 |
| 26 | (France) Matthias Cologon | | | | | | 15 | | | | | | | 0 |
| NC | (Netherlands) Casper Jansen | | | | | | | | | | | Ret | | 0 |
| Pos. | Driver | BHR (Bahrain) | VIE (Vietnam) | CHN (China) | NED (Netherlands) | CAN (Canada) | AUT (Austria) | GBR (United Kingdom) | BEL (Belgium) | ITA (Italy) | JPN (Japan) | MEX (Mexico) | BRA (Brazil) | Points |

Key
| Colour | Result |
|---|---|
| Gold | Winner |
| Silver | Second place |
| Bronze | Third place |
| Green | Other points position |
| Blue | Other classified position |
| Blue | Not classified, finished (NC) |
| Purple | Not classified, retired (Ret) |
| Red | Did not qualify (DNQ) |
| Red | Did not pre-qualify (DNPQ) |
| Black | Disqualified (DSQ) |
| White | Did not start (DNS) |
| White | Race cancelled (C) |
| Blank | Did not enter |
| Annotation | Meaning |
| P | Pole position |
| F | Fastest lap |

=== Teams' Championship standings ===
| Pos. | Team | BHR (Bahrain) | VIE (Vietnam) | CHN (China) | NED (Netherlands) | CAN (Canada) | AUT (Austria) | GBR (United Kingdom) | BEL (Belgium) | ITA (Italy) | JPN (Japan) | MEX (Mexico) | BRA (Brazil) | Points |
|---|---|---|---|---|---|---|---|---|---|---|---|---|---|---|
| 1 | (Austria) Red Bull Racing Esports | 3 | 5 | 2 | 1^{P} | 2 | 1 | 6^{P} | 1^{P} | 4 | 1^{P} | 3^{P} | 2 | 331 |
| 1 | (Austria) Red Bull Racing Esports | 6 | 6 | 5 | 3 | 3 | 2 | 7 | 3 | 8 | 5 | 6 | 11 | 331 |
| 2 | (Switzerland) Alfa Romeo Racing Orlen Esports | 1 | 3^{P} | 1^{P} | 2 | 1 | 3 | 3 | 2 | 2 | 4 | 1 | 3 | 295 |
| 2 | (Switzerland) Alfa Romeo Racing Orlen Esports | 2 | 15 | 3 | 12 | 8 | 12 | 9 | 5 | 16 | 9 | 4 | 7 | 295 |
| 3 | (France) Renault Vitality | 5^{P} | 2 | 10 | 5 | 4 | 5 | 1 | 9 | 10 | 2 | 13^{F} | 1^{P} | 136 |
| 3 | (France) Renault Vitality | 19 | 8 | 15^{F} | 13 | 12 | 17 | 18 | 12 | 17 | 16 | Ret | 18 | 136 |
| 4 | (Germany) Mercedes AMG Petronas Esports Team | 7 | 4 | 11 | 6 | 16 | 8 | 10 | 4 | 3 | 11 | 2 | 4 | 107 |
| 4 | (Germany) Mercedes AMG Petronas Esports Team | 11 | 13 | 17 | 8 | 17^{F} | 13 | 12 | 7 | 7 | 15 | 10 | 9 | 107 |
| 5 | (Italy) FDA Hublot Esports Team | 14 | 1 | 19 | 10 | 11 | 10 | 5 | 8 | 1^{P} | 7 | 11 | 6 | 100 |
| 5 | (Italy) FDA Hublot Esports Team | 20^{F} | 7 | 20 | 11 | Ret^{P} | 11 | 8 | 11 | 5 | 14 | Ret | 19 | 100 |
| 6 | (United Kingdom) McLaren Shadow | 8 | 19 | 9 | 7 | 5 | 14 | 2 | 13 | 9 | 6 | 5 | 5 | 80 |
| 6 | (United Kingdom) McLaren Shadow | 13 | 20 | 13 | 18 | 9 | 15 | 20^{F} | 19^{F} | 19 | 19 | 8 | 8 | 80 |
| 7 | (Italy) AlphaTauri Esports Team | 4 | 9 | 7 | 4 | 6 | 19^{F} | 13 | 15 | 11 | 8 | 17 | 17 | 46 |
| 7 | (Italy) AlphaTauri Esports Team | 12 | 14 | 18 | Ret | 10 | 20 | 19 | 16 | 18 | 10 | 18 | 20^{F} | 46 |
| 8 | (United Kingdom) Williams Esports | 9 | 11 | 4 | 9 | 7 | 4^{P} | 15 | 10 | 6 | 12 | 9 | 13 | 45 |
| 8 | (United Kingdom) Williams Esports | 15 | 12 | 12 | 15 | 14 | 16 | 17 | 18 | 12 | 20^{F} | 16 | 14 | 45 |
| 9 | (United States) Haas F1 Esports | 17 | 16 | 8 | 17 | 18 | 6 | 4 | 6 | 14 | 17 | 7 | 10 | 39 |
| 9 | (United States) Haas F1 Esports | 18 | 18 | 14 | 19^{F} | Ret | 18 | 14 | 17 | 20^{F} | 18 | 14 | 12 | 39 |
| 10 | (United Kingdom) BWT Racing Point Esports Team | 10 | 10 | 6 | 14 | 13 | 7 | 11 | 14 | 13 | 3 | 12 | 15 | 33 |
| 10 | (United Kingdom) BWT Racing Point Esports Team | 16 | 17^{F} | 16 | 16 | 15 | 9 | 16 | 20 | 15 | 13 | 15 | 16 | 33 |
| Pos. | Team | BHR (Bahrain) | VIE (Vietnam) | CHN (China) | NED (Netherlands) | CAN (Canada) | AUT (Austria) | GBR (United Kingdom) | BEL (Belgium) | ITA (Italy) | JPN (Japan) | MEX (Mexico) | BRA (Brazil) | Points |

Key
| Colour | Result |
|---|---|
| Gold | Winner |
| Silver | Second place |
| Bronze | Third place |
| Green | Other points position |
| Blue | Other classified position |
| Blue | Not classified, finished (NC) |
| Purple | Not classified, retired (Ret) |
| Red | Did not qualify (DNQ) |
| Red | Did not pre-qualify (DNPQ) |
| Black | Disqualified (DSQ) |
| White | Did not start (DNS) |
| White | Race cancelled (C) |
| Blank | Did not enter |
| Annotation | Meaning |
| P | Pole position |
| F | Fastest lap |

Notes:

- The standings are sorted by best result, rows are not related to the drivers. In case of tie on points, the best positions achieved determined the outcome.
