= Brendon Leigh =

British esports driver (born 1999)

- Born: 8 July 1999 (age 27); Reading, Berkshire, England
- Nationality: (United Kingdom) British

Formula One Esports Series career
- Years active: 2017–2025
- Teams: Mercedes, Ferrari, Sauber
- Starts: 57
- Championships: 2 (2017, 2018)
- Wins: 10
- Podiums: 16
- Poles: 5
- Fastest laps: 5

Previous series
- 2019: British Formula Ford 1600

Brendon Leigh (/liː/ LEE; born 8 July 1999) is a British former esports driver who competed in the Formula One Esports Series from 2017 to 2025. Leigh won two Formula One Sim Racing World Championship titles, which he won in 2017 and 2018, and won 10 races across eight seasons.

Born and raised in Reading, Berkshire, Leigh won the inaugural edition of the series in 2017, and defended his title 2018 with new team Mercedes. He was unable to repeat this feat the following year, and after four seasons, moved to the Ferrari for the next two seasons. For the 2023–24 season, he moved to Sauber and retired after his 2025 campaign.

== Career ==
=== Formula Ford 1600 Championship ===
Leigh drove in the 2019 BRSCC Formula Ford 1600 Championship, fulfilling a part-time role at Kevin Mills Racing. He competed in 11 races, and finished 13th in the championship.

=== Esports ===
Leigh competed in the inaugural season of the Formula One Esports Series. The Englishman won the competition back-to-back in 2017 and 2018.

For the 2019 Formula One Esports Series he competed with the Mercedes-AMG Petronas Esports Team. He finished the season in fifth with zero wins and two podiums, his best result being 2nd. The following year was much of the same thing, recording two podiums but again struggling to achieve a race win.

On 18th January 2021, Leigh announced that he had signed with the Ferrari Esports Team. Leigh endured his worst season to date, scoring no wins and no podiums, slumping to 10th in the drivers standings.

During 2022, he had a much better season. He scored a podium at the Circuit of the Americas and finished 8th in the standings with 49 points (despite missing a race).

For the 2023 season, he signed for Alfa Romeo F1 Team KICK Esports, racing for the R8G E-Sports team.

== Racing record ==
=== Esports career summary ===
Season	Series	Team	Races	Wins	Poles	F/Laps	Podiums	Points	Position
2017	Formula One Esports Series	None	5	4	N/A	N/A	4	74	**1st**
2018	Formula One Esports Series	Mercedes AMG Petronas Esports Team	10	6	4	2	8	216	**1st**
2019	Formula One Esports Series	Mercedes AMG Petronas Esports Team	12	0	0	0	2	77	5th
2020	Formula One Esports Series	Mercedes AMG Petronas Esports Team	12	0	0	1	2	84	6th
2021	Formula One Esports Series	FDA Esports Team	12	0	0	1	0	42	10th
2022	Formula One Esports Series	FDA Esports Team	11	0	0	2	1	49	8th
2023–24	Formula One Sim Racing World Championship	KICK F1 Sim Racing Team	12	0	0	0	1	47	10th
2025	Formula One Sim Racing World Championship	KICK F1 Sim Racing Team	10	0	0	0	0	1	20th

=== Complete Formula One Esports Series results ===
(key) (Races in bold indicate pole position) (Races in italics indicate fastest lap)

Year	Team	1	2	3	4	5	6	7	8	9	10	11	12	Pos	Points
2017	N/A	GBR; 1	BRA; 1	CAN; 1	BEL; 8	ABU; 1								1st	74
2018	Mercedes AMG Petronas Esports Team	AUS; 1	CHN; 1	AZE; 2	FRA; 1	GBR; 1	BEL; 5	GER; 2	SIN; 1	USA; 1	ABU; 5			1st	216
2019	Mercedes AMG Petronas Esports Team	BHR; 5	CHN; 11	AZE; 4	CAN; 2	AUT; 14	GBR; 6	GER; 17	BEL; 11	ITA; 6	JPN; 7	USA; 3	BRA; 11	5th	77
2020	Mercedes AMG Petronas Esports Team	BHR; 7	VIE; 4	CHN; 17	NED; 6	CAN; 17	AUT; 13	GBR; 10	BEL; 4	ITA; 3	JPN; 15	MEX; 2	BRA; 4	6th	84
2021	FDA Hublot Esports Team	BHR; 12	CHN; 6	AUT; 8	GBR; 6	ITA; 19	BEL; 18	POR; 17	NLD; 9	USA; 14	EMI; 5	MEX; 5	BRA; 18	10th	42
2022	FDA Esports Team	BHR; 7	EMI; 19	GBR; 7	RBR; 11	BEL	NLD; 6	ITA; 15	MEX; 9	USA; 3	JPN; 6	BRA; 17	ABU; 8	8th	49
2023–24	KICK F1 Sim Racing Team	BHR; 12	SAU; 16	RBR; 12	GBR; 5	BEL; 7	NLD; 10	USA; 3	MEX; Ret	BRA; 7	LVG; 7	QAT; 16	ABU; 9	10th	47
2025	KICK F1 Sim Racing Team	AUS; 15	CHN; 11	BHR; 16	SAU; Ret	GBR; 17	BEL; 10	NLD; 18	USA; 15	MEX; 18	BRA	QAT	ABU; 18	20th	1
