= F1 Sim Racing =

Online motor racing contest

- Current season, competition or edition: 2026 Formula One Sim Racing World Championship
- Sport: Esports
- Founded: 2017
- Owners: Formula One Management, Liberty Media
- CEO: Stefano Domenicali
- Countries: Worldwide
- Most recent champion: (Driver: (Wales) Otis Lawrence) (Team: (Austria) Oracle Red Bull Sim Racing)
- Most titles: (Netherlands) Jarno Opmeer (3)
- Website: www.formula1.com/en/page/f1-sim-racing

F1 Sim Racing is a professional esports programme promoted by Formula 1. The programme was created in 2017 to involve the official Formula 1 video game and its community of players, providing a new avenue for greater engagement with the sport of Formula 1. In 2018, the official Formula 1 teams joined the programme for the first time to set up their own esports teams to compete in the Formula 1 Esports Series championship.

== History ==
The first Formula One Esports Series was announced on 21 August 2017. Over 60,000 players attempted to qualify for the LAN finals of the first season, which were watched by viewers from 123 countries. Brendon Leigh won the inaugural championship.

2018 was Formula 1's first full season in esports and was split into 2 stages. In the first stage that opened in April 2018, online racers were offered the incredible opportunity to earn a place on the official esports driver line-up for one of the official F1 teams. Mercedes AMG Petronas Motorsport, Red Bull Racing, Force India F1 Team, Williams, Renault Sport F1 Team, Haas F1 Team, McLaren, Toro Rosso and Alfa Romeo Sauber F1 Team all offered positions in their esports driver line ups as part of the series inaugural Pro Draft. Over 66,000 gamers participated to vie for a spot in the official F1 teams' esports team who competed in the F1 New Balance Esports Series and a chance to win a share of the $200,000 prize fund. The series drew a record audience of 5.5million across selected TV networks and live streams online. Mercedes took the 2018 Team Championship and Brendon Leigh became two-time Driver Champion.

On 8 April 2019, Formula 1 announced the third instalment of the F1 Esports Series, with an increased prize fund of $500,000. Ferrari joined the series after choosing not to take part the year prior. The series was won by David Tonizza, driving for Ferrari Driver Academy, with Red Bull Racing Esports taking the Constructors' Trophy.

Due to the COVID-19 pandemic, the 2020 and 2021 seasons were held remotely online rather than in a LAN setting. Both titles were won by Jarno Opmeer, in 2020 for Alfa Romeo Racing Orlen Esports and in 2021 for Mercedes-AMG Petronas Esports. Frederik Rasmussen finished as runner-up in both championships. The championship remained online for the 2022 season when Lucas Blakeley and McLaren Shadow claimed their first titles in the series with Rasmussen again in second.

For the next season, the championship would be renamed to "F1 Sim Racing" and was contested across late 2023 and early 2024, as well as moved back to LAN for the first time since 2019. It was won by Rasmussen, who claimed his maiden title after finishing as runner-up in the four previous seasons. The 2025 championship was won by Jarno Opmeer, becoming the first driver to win three championships and the first time there was a driver's championships were not all won in consecutive seasons. Opmeer and Rasmussen paired up at Oracle Red Bull Sim Racing for the first time to win the teams’ record third Teams’ Championship that year.

== Format ==
Until 2022, teams could only sign drivers who had either previously competed in the pro series or qualified for that year's Pro Exhibition.

There were several ways to qualify for the Pro Exhibition. The most common was to finish in the top six of the drivers' standings of any of that years' online Challengers Series, which were shorter championships held separately on PC, PlayStation, and Xbox, and could be qualified for by setting one of the highest scores in special challenge scenarios that anyone could attempt. Three drivers per platform also qualified for the Pro Exhibition through the DHL Time Trial, where drivers competed to set the fastest times possible in the in-game Time Trial mode on specific circuits. Other minor methods of qualification included the Women's Wildcard.

However, the 2023 Pro Exhibition never occurred despite the Challengers Series' for that year having taken place, and since then, teams have been able to sign whichever drivers they want. The Challengers Series were canned from 2024 onwards.

Pro Series - All participating teams have three drivers in their line-up which they have to choose two of for each of the twelve 50% races that are broadcast live to the official F1 channels. They earn points for themselves and their teams. These points count towards the championship, after which the winning team and driver will be crowned the F1 Esports Series Teams’ and Drivers’ World Champions respectively, with a portion of the prize fund distributed to the teams based on their standings.

== Seasons ==
Year	Game	Venue	Drivers' Champion	Team	Teams' Champion
2017	F1 2017	(United Arab Emirates) Yas Marina Circuit	(United Kingdom) Brendon Leigh	—N/a	
2018	F1 2018	(United Kingdom) Gfinity Esports Arena	(United Kingdom) Brendon Leigh	(Germany) Mercedes-AMG Petronas Esports	(Germany) Mercedes-AMG Petronas Esports
2019	F1 2019	(United Kingdom) Gfinity Esports Arena	(Italy) David Tonizza	(Italy) Scuderia Ferrari Esports Team	(Austria) Red Bull Racing Esports
2020	F1 2020	Online (Note: The 2020 and 2021 championships were held online due to the COVID-19 pandemic.)	(Netherlands) Jarno Opmeer	(Switzerland) Alfa Romeo Racing Orlen Esports	(Austria) Red Bull Racing Esports
2021	F1 2021	Online	(Netherlands) Jarno Opmeer	(Germany) Mercedes-AMG Petronas Esports	(Germany) Mercedes-AMG Petronas Esports
2022	F1 22	Online	(United Kingdom) Lucas Blakeley	(United Kingdom) McLaren Shadow	(United Kingdom) McLaren Shadow
2023–24	F1 23	(Sweden) Jönköping (R1) (Sweden) Stockholm (R2–12)	(Denmark) Frederik Rasmussen	(Austria) Oracle Red Bull Sim Racing	(Italy) Scuderia Ferrari Esports Team
2025	F1 24	(Sweden) Stockholm	(Netherlands) Jarno Opmeer	(Austria) Oracle Red Bull Sim Racing	(Austria) Oracle Red Bull Sim Racing
2026	F1 25	(United Kingdom) Birmingham (R1-3) (United Kingdom) Biggin Hill (R4-12)	(Wales) Otis Lawrence	(France) Alpine Sim Racing	(Austria) Oracle Red Bull Sim Racing

== Statistics ==
The statistics for the 2 (times 4) semi finals in 2017 are also included.
All tables are updated up until 2026 Round 12: Abu Dhabi, held at 28 May 2026.

=== Drivers championships ===
	Driver	Championships	2nd place	3rd place	4th place	5th place	Total top 5
1	(Netherlands) Jarno Opmeer	3 (2020, 2021, 2025)		1 (2026)	2 (2019, 2023-24)	1 (2022)	7
2	(United Kingdom) Brendon Leigh	2 (2017, 2018)				1 (2019)	3
3	(Denmark) Frederik Rasmussen	1 (2023-24)	4 (2019, 2020, 2021, 2022)	1 (2018)	1 (2026)		7
4	(United Kingdom) Lucas Blakeley	1 (2022)		1 (2021)			2
5	(United Kingdom) Otis Lawrence	1 (2026)				1 (2025)	2
6	(Italy) David Tonizza	1 (2019)					1
7	(Spain) Ismael Fahssi		2 (2025, 2026)				2
8	(Netherlands) Thomas Ronhaar		1 (2023-24)	1 (2022)	1 (2025)		3
9	(Hungary) Dániel Bereznay		1 (2018)	1 (2019)		1 (2020)	3
10	(Chile) Fabrizio Donoso Delgado		1 (2017)				1
11	(Iran) Bari Broumand			2 (2023-24, 2025)	1 (2022)	1 (2021)	4
12	(Germany) Marcel Kiefer			1 (2020)		1 (2018)	2
13	(Germany) Sven Zürner			1 (2017)			1
14	(France) Nicolas Longuet				1 (2020)	1 (2026)	2
15	(Germany) Patrik Holzmann				1 (2017)		1
16	(United Kingdom) Salih Saltunç				1 (2018)		1
17	(Spain) Dani Moreno				1 (2021)		1
18	(Turkey) Cem Bölükbaşı					1 (2017)	1
19	(United Kingdom) Alfie Butcher					1 (2023-24)	1

=== Starts ===
In total there were 99 races held: 3 in 2017 (plus 2 semi finals in 4 groups), 10 in 2018 and 12 from 2019 onwards.
This table only contains drivers with more than 25 starts.

	Driver	Seasons	Starts
1	(Denmark) Frederik Rasmussen	2017 – 2026	97
2	(United Kingdom) Brendon Leigh	2017 – 2025	84
2	(Netherlands) Jarno Opmeer	2019 – 2026	84
4	(Finland) Joni Törmälä	2017 – 2026	81
5	(Hungary) Dániel Bereznay	2017 – 2026	78
6	(Spain) Álvaro Carretón	2018 – 2026	77
7	(France) Nicolas Longuet	2019 – 2026	71
8	(United Kingdom) Lucas Blakeley	2019 – 2025	63
9	(Germany) Marcel Kiefer	2017 – 2022	56
10	(Chile) Fabrizio Donoso Delgado	2017 – 2018, 2020 – 2025	55
10	(Iran) Bari Broumand	2020 – 2026	55
12	(Germany) Simon Weigang	2019 – 2023-24	48
12	(Netherlands) Thomas Ronhaar	2022 – 2026	48
14	(Italy) David Tonizza	2019 – 2022	41
14	(Italy) Daniele Haddad	2019 – 2022	41
16	(United Kingdom) Josh Idowu	2021 – 2026	40
17	(Germany) Cedric Thomé	2017, 2019 – 2021	36
17	(Spain) Ismael Fahssi	2023-24 – 2026	36
17	(United Kingdom) Alfie Butcher	2023-24 – 2026	36
20	(Spain) Dani Moreno	2020 – 2023-24	34
21	(United Kingdom) Salih Saltunç	2017 – 2020	33
22	(Italy) Enzo Bonito	2018 – 2020	32
23	(Netherlands) Bono Huis	2018 – 2020	31
23	(United Kingdom) Tom Manley	2023-24 – 2026	31
25	(United Kingdom) Jake Benham	2022 – 2026	30
26	(Turkey) Ulaş Özyıldırım	2023-24 – 2026	28
27	(Germany) Patrick Holzmann	2017 – 2019	25
27	(Spain) Rubén Pedreño	2023-24 – 2026	25

=== Wins ===
	Driver	Starts	Wins	Percentage
1	(Denmark) Frederik Rasmussen	97	17	17.53 %
1	(Netherlands) Jarno Opmeer	84	17	20.24 %
3	(United Kingdom) Brendon Leigh **	84	10	11.90 %
4	(Iran) Bari Broumand	55	7	12.73 %
5	(Italy) David Tonizza	41	6	14.63 %
5	(United Kingdom) Lucas Blakeley	63	6	9.52 %
5	(Netherlands) Thomas Ronhaar	48	6	12.50 %
8	(Hungary) Dániel Bereznay	78	5	6.41 %
8	(United Kingdom) Otis Lawrence	24	5	20.83 %
8	(Spain) Ismael Fahssi	36	5	13.89 %
11	(Germany) Marcel Kiefer	56	3	5.36 %
11	(France) Nicolas Longuet	71	3	4.23 %
11	(United Kingdom) Alfie Butcher	36	3	8.33 %
14	(Netherlands) Allert van der Wal **	9	2	22.22 %
14	(United Kingdom) Sonuç Saltunç **	11	2	18.18 %
14	(Germany) Patrik Holzmann **	25	2	8.00 %
17	(Turkey) Cem Bölükbaşı	18	1	5.56 %
17	(United Kingdom) Salih Saltunç	33	1	3.03 %
17	(Germany) Cedric Thomé	36	1	2.78 %
17	(Spain) Dani Moreno	34	1	2.94 %

** Two of their wins were achieved in the 2017 semi finals.

=== Top 10 most wins in one season ===
	Driver	Season	Races	Wins	Percentage	WDC
1	(United Kingdom) Brendon Leigh	2018	10	6	60.00 %	1st
2	(United Kingdom) Brendon Leigh	2017	5	4	80.00 %	1st
2	(Netherlands) Jarno Opmeer	2020	12	4	33.33 %	1st
2	(Netherlands) Jarno Opmeer	2021	12	4	33.33 %	1st
2	(United Kingdom) Lucas Blakeley	2022	12	4	33.33 %	1st
2	(Spain) Ismael Fahssi	2026	12	4	33.33 %	2nd
7	(Italy) David Tonizza	2019	12	3	25.00 %	1st
7	(Denmark) Frederik Rasmussen	2019	12	3	25.00 %	2nd
7	(Denmark) Frederik Rasmussen	2020	12	3	25.00 %	2nd
7	(Denmark) Frederik Rasmussen	2021	12	3	25.00 %	2nd
7	(Denmark) Frederik Rasmussen	2023-24	12	3	25.00 %	1st
7	(Hungary) Dániel Bereznay	2019	12	3	25.00 %	3rd
7	(Netherlands) Thomas Ronhaar	2023-24	12	3	25.00 %	2nd
7	(Iran) Bari Broumand	2023-24	12	3	25.00 %	3rd
7	(Iran) Bari Broumand	2025	12	3	25.00 %	3rd
7	(Netherlands) Jarno Opmeer	2025	12	3	25.00 %	1st
7	(United Kingdom) Otis Lawrence	2026	12	3	25.00 %	1st

=== Pole positions ===
It is unknown who got pole in the 2017 semi finals, therefore were these race entries not included to keep the percentages fair.

	Driver	Entries	Poles	Percentage
1	(Denmark) Frederik Rasmussen	95	21	22.11 %
2	(Netherlands) Thomas Ronhaar	48	12	25.00 %
3	(France) Nicolas Longuet	71	9	12.68 %
4	(Hungary) Dániel Bereznay	76	7	9.21 %
5	(Italy) David Tonizza	41	6	14.63 %
5	(Iran) Bari Broumand	55	6	10.91 %
7	(United Kingdom) Brendon Leigh	82	5	6.10 %
7	(Netherlands) Jarno Opmeer	84	5	5.95 %
9	(United Kingdom) Lucas Blakeley	63	4	6.35 %
9	(Spain) Ismael Fahssi	36	4	11.11 %
9	(United Kingdom) Otis Lawrence	24	4	16.67 %
12	(Turkey) Ulaş Özyıldırım	28	3	10.71 %
13	(Spain) Álvaro Carretón	77	2	2.60 %
13	(United Kingdom) Josh Idowu	40	2	5.00 %
15	(Turkey) Cem Bölükbaşı	16	1	6.25 %
15	(Chile) Fabrizio Donoso Delgado	53	1	1.89 %
15	(United Kingdom) Salih Saltunç	31	1	3.23 %
15	(Italy) Enzo Bonito	32	1	3.13 %
15	(Finland) Tino Naukkarinen	19	1	5.26 %

=== Top 10 most pole positions in one season ===
	Driver	Season	Races	Poles	Percentage	WDC
1	(Denmark) Frederik Rasmussen	2020	12	5	41.67 %	2nd
2	(United Kingdom) Brendon Leigh	2018	10	4	40.00 %	1st
2	(Denmark) Frederik Rasmussen	2022	12	4	33.33 %	2nd
2	(Netherlands) Thomas Ronhaar	2022	12	4	33.33 %	3rd
2	(Netherlands) Thomas Ronhaar	2023-24	12	4	33.33 %	2nd
2	(Netherlands) Thomas Ronhaar	2025	12	4	33.33 %	4th
2	(United Kingdom) Otis Lawrence	2026	12	4	33.33 %	1st
2	(Denmark) Frederik Rasmussen	2026	12	4	33.33 %	4th
9	(Hungary) Dániel Bereznay	2018	10	3	30.00 %	2nd
9	(Hungary) Dániel Bereznay	2019	12	3	25.00 %	3rd
9	(Italy) David Tonizza	2019	12	3	25.00 %	1st
9	(Denmark) Frederik Rasmussen	2019	12	3	25.00 %	2nd
9	(France) Nicolas Longuet	2021	12	3	25.00 %	8th
9	(Iran) Bari Broumand	2023-24	12	3	25.00 %	3rd
9	(Spain) Ismael Fahssi	2025	12	3	25.00 %	2nd

=== Fastest laps ===
There were no fastest laps awarded in 2017 and in the last four races in 2018. These race starts were not included to keep the percentages fair.

	Driver	Starts	Fastest laps	Percentage
1	(Netherlands) Jarno Opmeer	84	9	10.71 %
2	(United Kingdom) Brendon Leigh	75	7	9.33 %
2	(Finland) Joni Törmälä	72	7	9.72 %
4	(Germany) Patrick Holzmann	16	5	31.25 %
4	(France) Nicolas Longuet	71	5	7.04 %
4	(Denmark) Frederik Rasmussen	90	5	5.56 %
7	(Slovakia) Filip Prešnajder	20	3	15.00 %
7	(Spain) Álvaro Carretón	73	3	4.11 %
7	(United Kingdom) Lucas Blakeley	63	3	4.76 %
7	(Netherlands) Thomas Ronhaar	48	3	6.25 %
7	(United Kingdom) Alfie Butcher	36	3	13.89 %
12	(Finland) Tino Naukkarinen	15	2	13.33 %
12	(United Kingdom) James Baldwin	11	2	18.18 %
12	(Italy) Daniele Haddad	41	2	4.88 %
12	(Poland) Tomasz Poradzisz	4	2	50.00 %
12	(Spain) Ismael Fahssi	36	2	5.56 %
12	(United Kingdom) Tom Manley	31	2	6.45 %
12	(Iran) Bari Broumand	55	2	3.64 %
12	(United Kingdom) Jake Benham	30	2	6.67 %
12	(Spain) Rubén Pedreño	25	2	8.00 %
12	(Hungary) Dani Bereznay	72	2	2.78 %
22	(Italy) Enzo Bonito	28	1	3.57 %
22	(Czech Republic) Martin Stefanko	7	1	14.29 %
22	(Germany) Jan Fehler	11	1	9.09 %
22	(Italy) Amos Laurito	9	1	11.11 %
22	(United Kingdom) Isaac Price	4	1	25.00 %
22	(Italy) David Tonizza	41	1	2.44 %
22	(Germany) Cedric Thomé	31	1	3.23 %
22	(Germany) Simon Weigang	48	1	2.08 %
22	(United Kingdom) Sebastian Job	19	1	5.26 %
22	(Spain) Dani Moreno	34	1	2.94 %
22	(Germany) Marcel Kiefer	50	1	2.00 %
22	(Netherlands) Matthijs van Erven	17	1	5.88 %
22	(Poland) Piotr Stachulec	7	1	14.29 %
22	(Hungary) Patrik Sipos	21	1	4.76 %
22	(United Kingdom) Jed Norgrove	9	1	11.11 %
22	(Chile) Fabrizio Donoso Delgado	47	1	2.13 %
22	(Hungary) István Puki	15	1	6.67 %

=== Top 10 most fastest laps in one season ===
	Driver	Season	Races	Fastest laps	Percentage	WDC
1	(Germany) Patrick Holzmann	2019	12	4	33.33 %	14th
2	(Netherlands) Jarno Opmeer	2023-24	12	3	25.00 %	4th
2	(Netherlands) Jarno Opmeer	2026	12	3	25.00 %	3rd
4	(United Kingdom) Brendon Leigh	2018	6	2	33.33 %	1st
4	(United Kingdom) Brendon Leigh	2022	12	2	16.67 %	8th
4	(Finland) Tino Naukkarinen	2019	12	2	16.67 %	11th
4	(Denmark) Frederik Rasmussen	2019	12	2	16.67 %	2nd
4	(United Kingdom) James Baldwin	2020	12	2	16.67 %	17th
4	(France) Nicolas Longuet	2020	12	2	16.67 %	4th
4	(Finland) Joni Törmälä	2020	12	2	16.67 %	10th
4	(Finland) Joni Törmälä	2021	12	2	16.67 %	11th
4	(Slovakia) Filip Prešnajder	2022	12	2	16.67 %	21st
4	(Poland) Tomasz Poradzisz	2022	12	2	16.67 %	25th
4	(Netherlands) Jarno Opmeer	2025	12	2	16.67 %	1st
4	(United Kingdom) Lucas Blakeley	2025	12	2	16.67 %	15th
4	(United Kingdom) Tom Manley	2025	12	2	16.67 %	12th
4	(Hungary) Dani Bereznay	2026	12	2	16.67 %	11th

=== Podiums ===
	Driver	Starts	Podiums	Percentage
1	(Denmark) Frederik Rasmussen **	97	51	52.58 %
2	(Netherlands) Jarno Opmeer	84	35	41.67 %
3	(Iran) Bari Broumand	55	22	40.00 %
4	(Hungary) Dániel Bereznay	78	20	25.64 %
4	(Netherlands) Thomas Ronhaar	48	20	41.67 %
6	(United Kingdom) Brendon Leigh **	84	18	21.43 %
7	(Germany) Marcel Kiefer *	56	16	28.57 %
7	(France) Nicolas Longuet	71	16	22.54 %
9	(United Kingdom) Lucas Blakeley	63	13	20.63 %
10	(Italy) David Tonizza	41	11	26.83 %
10	(Spain) Ismael Fahssi	36	11	30.56 %
12	(United Kingdom) Otis Lawrence	24	8	33.33 %
13	(United Kingdom) Alfie Butcher	36	7	19.44 %
14	(Germany) Patrick Holzmann **	25	5	20.00 %
14	(Finland) Joni Törmälä *	81	5	6.17 %
16	(Germany) Sven Zürner **	12	4	33.33 %
16	(Chile) Fabrizio Donoso Delgado	55	4	7.27 %
16	(United Kingdom) Josh Idowu	40	4	10.00 %
16	(United Kingdom) Jake Benham	30	4	13.33 %
20	(Turkey) Cem Bölükbaşı **	18	3	16.67 %
20	(Netherlands) Allert van der Wal **	9	3	33.33 %
20	(Germany) Cedric Thomé **	36	3	8.33 %
20	(Spain) Álvaro Carretón	77	3	3.90 %
20	(Spain) Dani Moreno	34	3	8.82 %
20	(Hungary) István Puki	15	3	20.00 %
20	(Spain) Rubén Pedreño	25	3	12.00 %
27	(United Kingdom) Sonuç Saltunç **	11	2	18.18 %
27	(Italy) Nicolò Fioroni **	5	2	40.00 %
27	(United Kingdom) Salih Saltunç	33	2	6.06 %
27	(Finland) Tino Naukkarinen	19	2	10.53 %
27	(United Kingdom) Tom Manley	31	2	6.45 %
32	(Poland) Patryk Krutyj *	15	1	6.67 %
32	(Venezuela) Gianfranco Giglioli *	5	1	20.00 %
32	(Brazil) Igor Fraga *	5	1	20.00 %
32	(Italy) Tiziano Brioni *	5	1	20.00 %
32	(Netherlands) Bono Huis	31	1	3.23 %
32	(Italy) Enzo Bonito	32	1	3.13 %
32	(Italy) Daniele Haddad	41	1	2.44 %
32	(United Kingdom) Sebastian Job	19	1	5.26 %

* One of their podiums was achieved in the 2017 semi finals.
** Two of their podiums were achieved in the 2017 semi finals.

=== Top 10 most podiums in one season ===
	Driver	Season	Races	Podiums	Percentage	WDC
1	(Denmark) Frederik Rasmussen	2021	12	9	75.00 %	2nd
2	(United Kingdom) Brendon Leigh	2018	10	8	80.00 %	1st
2	(Netherlands) Jarno Opmeer	2020	12	8	66.66 %	1st
2	(Denmark) Frederik Rasmussen	2022	12	8	66.66 %	2nd
5	(Italy) David Tonizza	2019	12	7	58.33 %	1st
5	(Denmark) Frederik Rasmussen	2019	12	7	58.33 %	2nd
5	(Germany) Marcel Kiefer	2020	12	7	58.33 %	3rd
5	(Netherlands) Jarno Opmeer	2021	12	7	58.33 %	1st
5	(Netherlands) Thomas Ronhaar	2022	12	7	58.33 %	3rd
5	(Netherlands) Thomas Ronhaar	2023-24	12	7	58.33 %	2nd

=== Points ===
The points system is the same as in real F1, including the fastest lap point accompanied with a points finish from 2019 onwards. There were two races with exceptions:

- For the last race in 2017, there was a different point system where every finisher was awarded points (45-38-34-29-etc.)
- For the last race in 2018, double points were awarded.

This table only contains drivers with 100 points or more.

	Driver	Starts	Points	Average	Point finishes	Percentage
1	(Denmark) Frederik Rasmussen	97	1275	13.14	87	89.69 %
2	(Netherlands) Jarno Opmeer	84	1026	12.21	76	90.48 %
3	(United Kingdom) Brendon Leigh	84	640	7.62	51	60.71 %
4	(Iran) Bari Broumand	55	597	10.85	44	80.00 %
5	(Hungary) Dániel Bereznay	78	591	7.58	48	61.54 %
6	(France) Nicolas Longuet	71	589	8.30	54	76.06 %
7	(Netherlands) Thomas Ronhaar	48	513	10.67	37	77.08 %
8	(United Kingdom) Lucas Blakeley	63	461	7.32	39	61.90 %
9	(Germany) Marcel Kiefer	56	404	7.21	40	71.43 %
10	(Italy) David Tonizza	41	362	8.83	31	75.61 %
11	(Spain) Ismael Fahssi	36	342	9.50	27	75.00 %
12	(United Kingdom) Alfie Butcher	36	278	7.72	28	77.78 %
13	(United Kingdom) Otis Lawrence	24	264	11.00	22	9.67 %
14	(Finland) Joni Törmälä	81	253	3.12	36	44.44 %
15	(Spain) Álvaro Carretón	77	241	3.13	35	45.45 %
16	(Spain) Dani Moreno	34	202	5.94	24	70.59 %
17	(Chile) Fabrizio Donoso Delgado	55	190	3.45	22	40.00 %
18	(Germany) Patrick Holzmann	25	176	7.04	15	60.00 %
19	(United Kingdom) Salih Saltunç	33	161	4.88	19	57.58 %
20	(Netherlands) Bono Huis	31	144	4.65	22	70.97 %
21	(United Kingdom) Jake Benham	30	143	4.77	15	50.00 %
22	(United Kingdom) Josh Idowu	40	139	3.48	18	45.00 %
23	(Germany) Sven Zürner	12	108	9.00	6	50.00 %
24	(Netherlands) Allert van der Wal	9	105	11.67	6	66.67 %
25	(Turkey) Cem Bölükbaşı	18	104	5.78	8	44.44 %
25	(Italy) Enzo Bonito	32	104	3.25	13	40.63 %
26	(United Kingdom) Tom Manley	31	103	3.32	13	41.94 %

=== Top 10 most points in one season ===
	Driver	Season	Races	Points	Average	Point finishes	Percentage	WDC
1	(United Kingdom) Brendon Leigh	2018 †	10	216	21.60	10	100 %	1st
2	(Netherlands) Jarno Opmeer	2020	12	196	16.33	12	100 %	1st
3	(Netherlands) Jarno Opmeer	2021	12	195	16.25	12	100 %	1st
4	(Denmark) Frederik Rasmussen	2021	12	187	15.58	11	91.67 %	2nd
5	(Italy) David Tonizza	2019	12	184	15.33	12	100 %	1st
6	(United Kingdom) Lucas Blakeley	2022	12	181	15.08	12	100 %	1st
7	(Denmark) Frederik Rasmussen	2020	12	174	14.50	11	91.67 %	2nd
8	(Denmark) Frederik Rasmussen	2022	12	173	14.42	11	91.67 %	2nd
9	(Denmark) Frederik Rasmussen	2023-24	12	172	14.33	12	100 %	1st
10	(Denmark) Frederik Rasmussen	2019	12	171	14.25	10	83.33 %	2nd

† Double points awarded in the last race.
Notes: Other drivers with a 100 % point finishes season (besides in 2017 where 3 out of 5 races everyone had guaranteed points) are:

- Marcel Kiefer in 2020
- Lucas Blakely in 2021

=== Doubles (pole to win) ===
	Driver	Poles	Doubles	Percentage
1	(Denmark) Frederik Rasmussen	21	9	42.86 %
2	(United Kingdom) Brendon Leigh	5	5	100 %
3	(Iran) Bari Broumand	6	4	66.67 %
4	(Hungary) Dániel Bereznay	7	3	42.86 %
4	(United Kingdom) Lucas Blakeley	4	3	75.00 %
6	(Italy) David Tonizza	6	2	33.33 %
6	(Netherlands) Jarno Opmeer	5	2	40.00 %
6	(Netherlands) Thomas Ronhaar	12	2	16.67 %
9	(Turkey) Cem Bölükbaşı	1	1	100 %
9	(United Kingdom) Salih Saltunç	1	1	100 %
9	(France) Nicolas Longuet	9	1	11.11 %
9	(Spain) Ismael Fahssi	4	1	25.00 %
9	(United Kingdom) Otis Lawrence	4	1	25.00 %
9	(Turkey) Ulaş Özyıldırım	3	1	33.33 %

Notes: There were 2 hattricks recorded:

- Brendon Leigh at the 2018 Great Britain Grand Prix
- Jarno Opmeer at the 2021 Austrian Grand Prix

=== Other driver records ===
Description	Record	Details
Champion with most races left	2	(United Kingdom) Brendon Leigh (2018 after round 8 of 10)
Most consecutive wins	3	(United Kingdom) Brendon Leigh (2017 British Grand Prix – 2017 Canadian Grand Prix)** (United Kingdom) Brendon Leigh (2017 Abu Dhabi Grand Prix – 2018 Chinese Grand Prix) (Spain) Ismael Fahssi (2026 Mexico City Grand Prix – 2026 Abu Dhabi Grand Prix)
Most wins with fastest lap	3	(Netherlands) Jarno Opmeer
Most starts without a win	81	(Finland) Joni Törmälä
Most consecutive pole positions	3	(Denmark) Frederik Rasmussen (2022 British Grand Prix – 2022 Belgian Grand Prix) (Wales) Otis Lawrence (2026 Saudi-Arabia Grand Prix – 2026 British Grand Prix)
Most entries without a pole position	79	(Finland) Joni Törmälä
Most consecutive fastest laps	2	(Germany) Patrik Holzmann (2019 Chinese Grand Prix – 2019 Azerbaijan Grand Prix) (Finland) Tino Naukkarinen (2019 British Grand Prix – 2019 German Grand Prix) (United Kingdom) James Baldwin (2020 British Grand Prix – 2020 Belgian Grand Prix) (Finland) Joni Törmälä (2020 Brazilian Grand Prix – 2021 Bahrain Grand Prix) (Slovakia) Filip Prešnajder (2022 Austrian Grand Prix – 2022 Belgian Grand Prix) (Netherlands) Jarno Opmeer (2023-24 British Grand Prix – 2023-24 Belgian Grand Prix) (Netherlands) Jarno Opmeer (2026 Japanese Grand Prix – 2026 Bahrain Grand Prix)
Most starts without a fastest lap	40	(United Kingdom) Josh Idowu
Most consecutive podiums	7	(Denmark) Frederik Rasmussen (2021 Belgian Grand Prix – 2021 Brazilian Grand Prix)
Most starts without a podium	48	(Germany) Simon Weigang
Most consecutive points finishes	25	(Netherlands) Jarno Opmeer (2020 Bahrain Grand Prix – 2022 Bahrain Grand Prix)
Most starts without a point	20	(United Kingdom) John Evans
Fewest career points	-3	(Netherlands) Tycho Hardy
Most retirements	5	(United Kingdom) Tom Manley
Most disqualifications	1	(Turkey) Ulaş Özyıldırım (Netherlands) Tycho Hardy
Most penalty points	23	(Netherlands) Thomas Ronhaar

All statistics are correct as of the end of the 2026 season.
