= Lucas Blakeley =

British racing driver (born 2001)

- Nationality: (United Kingdom) British
- Born: 15 July 2001 (age 25) Irvine, North Ayrshire, Scotland

Lucas Blakeley (born 15 July 2001) is a British racing driver from Scotland who last competed for Douglas Motorsport in the GB4 Championship. In sim-racing, Blakeley won the 2022 Formula One Esports Series with McLaren Shadow.

== Esports career ==
Born in Irvine, North Ayrshire, Blakeley briefly competed in karts before switching to sim-racing due to budget constraints. In 2019, he qualified for a spot in the Formula One Esports Series, doing so as part of Sport Pesa Racing Point F1 Esports Team. Racing in the final four rounds of the season, Blakeley scored his maiden series podium second time out at Suzuka, finishing second to Frederik Rasmussen.

Blakeley remained with BWT Racing Point Esports Team for 2020, winning the F1 Esports Pro Exhibition at Monaco, but only scored a best result of sixth at Shanghai in the main season en route to 15th in points. Staying with the newly-rebranded Aston Martin Cognizant Esports Team in 2021, Blakeley scored his maiden series wins at Bahrain and Algarve, and took four more podiums to end the year third in points.

Joining McLaren Shadow for 2022, Blakeley opened up the season by winning the first two races in Bahrain and Imola, before collecting two more wins at Zandvoort and Interlagos in the second half of the season to clinch his maiden F1 Esports title by eight points over Frederik Rasmussen. Blakeley remained with McLaren Shadow for the next two seasons, only scoring a podium by finishing second Spa in the 2023–24 season, before leaving the team at the end of 2025.

== Real life career ==
Blakeley drove for Team eROC in the Race of Champions, in which he beat Sebastian Vettel in a head-to-head race in the first round of the Nations Cup. During 2022, Blakeley also began racing Formula Ford in both the Scottish Formula Ford championship. In his first season in single-seaters, finished runner-up in points after the season was cut short due to a lack of entrants.

In early 2023, Blakeley returned to the Race of Champions, in which he edged out Opmeer to win the eROC World Final and also raced for Team eROC in the main event. Blakeley returned to Formula Ford for the rest of the year, racing in three rounds and taking his maiden series win in Brands Hatch in June. During 2023, Blakeley also made his GB4 debut with KMR Sport at Snetterton. After taking a best result of seventh at Snetterton, Blakeley returned to the team two rounds later for the finale at Donington Park, where he took his maiden series podium by finishing third in race one.

In 2024, Blakeley returned to KMR Sport for another part-time appearance in GB4, replacing Brandon McCaughan to race in the Snetterton and Silverstone rounds. After taking his maiden series win on his return, Blakeley won again at Silverstone by 15.4 seconds over Linus Granfors, setting a record for the biggest winning margin in the series in the process. Staying with the team for the following round at Donington Park, Blakeley won race one and finished the other two races on the podium. Despite uncertainty whether he would race in the season-finale at Brands Hatch, Blakeley competed in said round, in which he took his fourth and final win of the season as he jumped to fifth in points despite missing three rounds.

In late 2025, Blakeley made a one-off return to the GB4 Championship with Douglas Motorsport at the season-ending Donington Park round, finishing third on his series return in race one. The following year, Blakeley raced part-time in the Trophée Mitjet 2L France as a guest driver for Mitjet International.

== Sim racing record ==
=== Esports career summary ===
Season	Series	Team	Races	Wins	Poles	F/Laps	Podiums	Points	Position
2019	Formula One Esports Series	Sport Pesa Racing Point F1 Esports Team	4	0	0	0	1	20	15th
2020	Formula One Esports Series	BWT Racing Point Esports Team	11	0	0	1	0	15	15th
2021	Formula One Esports Series	Aston Martin Cognizant Esports Team	12	2	1	0	6	162	**3rd**
2022	Formula One Esports Series	McLaren Shadow	12	4	2	0	5	181	**1st**
2023–24	Formula One Sim Racing World Championship	McLaren Shadow	12	0	1	0	1	69	7th
2025	Formula One Sim Racing World Championship	McLaren Shadow	12	0	0	2	0	14	15th

=== Complete Formula One Esports Series results ===
(key) (Races in bold indicate pole position) (Races in italics indicate fastest lap)

Year	Team	1	2	3	4	5	6	7	8	9	10	11	12	Pos	Points
2019	Sport Pesa Racing Point F1 Esports Team	BHR	CHN	AZE	CAN	AUT	GBR	GER	BEL	ITA; 13	JPN; 2	USA; 15	BRA; 9	15th	20
2020	BWT Racing Point Esports Team	BHR; 10	VIE; 17	CHN; 6	NED; 14	CAN; 13	AUT; 7	GBR; 11	BEL; 20	ITA	JPN; 13	MEX; 12	BRA; 15	15th	15
2021	Aston Martin Cognizant Esports Team	BHR; 1	CHN; 4	AUT; 4	GBR; 3	ITA; 3	BEL; 6	**POR**; 1	NED; 3	USA; 6	EMI; 10	MEX; 6	BRA; 2	3rd	162
2022	McLaren Shadow	**BHR**; 1	EMI; 1	GBR; 3	AUT; 6	BEL; 4	NED; 1	ITA; 6	MEX; 7	USA; 6	JPN; 4	**BRA**; 1	UAE; 4	1st	181
2023–24	McLaren Shadow	BHR; 17	SAU; 4	AUT; 14	GBR; 6	BEL; 2	NED; 6	**USA**; 4	MXC; 13	SAP; 6	LVG; 9	QAT; 18	ABU; 16	7th	69
2025	McLaren Shadow	AUS; 15	CHN; 12	BHR; 16	SAU; 12	GBR; 5	BEL; 18	NLD; 20	USA; 11	MEX; 10	BRA; 16	QAT; 10	ABU; 12	15th	14

== Racing record ==
=== Racing career summary ===
Season	Series	Team	Races	Wins	Poles	FLaps	Podiums	Points	Position
2022	BRSCC National Formula Ford Championship – Pro		3	0	0	0	0	0	NC
2023	National Formula Ford 1600 – Pro	KMR Sport	7	1	0	2	2	143	8th
2023	GB4 Championship	KMR Sport	6	0	0	0	1	89	15th
2024	GB4 Championship	KMR Sport	15	4	0	7	9	306	5th
2025	GB4 Championship	Douglas Motorsport	3	0	0	0	1	40	26th
2026	Trophée Mitjet 2L France	Mitjet International	4	0	0	0	2	0	NC†

=== Complete GB4 Championship results ===
(key) (Races in bold indicate pole position) (Races in italics indicate fastest lap)

Year	Entrant	1	2	3	4	5	6	7	8	9	10	11	12	13	14	15	16	17	18	19	20	21	22	DC	Points
2023	KMR Sport	OUL; 1	OUL; 2	OUL; 3	SIL1; 1	SIL1; 2	SIL1; 3	DON1; 1	DON1; 2	DON1; 3	DON1; 4	SNE; 1; 11	SNE; 2; 7	SNE; 3; 7^{1}	SIL2; 1	SIL2; 2	SIL2; 3	BRH; 1	BRH; 2	BRH; 3	DON2; 1; 3	DON2; 2; 5	DON2; 3; 5	15th	89
2024	KMR Sport	OUL; 1	OUL; 2	OUL; 3	SIL1; 1	SIL1; 2	SIL1; 3	DON1; 1	DON1; 2	DON1; 3	SNE; 1; 1	SNE; 2; 3	SNE; 3; 5^{6}	SIL2; 1; 2	SIL2; 2; 1	SIL2; 3; 4^{7}	DON2; 1; 1	DON2; 2; 3	DON2; 3; 2^{6}	BRH; 1; 2	BRH; 2; 1	BRH; 3 Ret		5th	306
2025	Douglas Motorsport	DON; 1	DON; 2	DON; 3	SIL1; 1	SIL1; 2	SIL1; 3	OUL; 1	OUL; 2	OUL; 3	SNE; 1	SNE; 2	SNE; 3	SIL2; 1	SIL2; 2	SIL2; 3	BRH; 1	BRH; 2	BRH; 3	DON2; 1; 3	DON2; 2; 12	DON2; 3; 9	DON2; 4	26th	40
