= 2017 Formula One Esports Series =

Racing eSports Series

Tournament information
- Sport: Formula One Esports Series
- Location: Qualification: Worldwide; Semi-Finals: London, United Kingdom; Final: Abu Dhabi, United Arab Emirates
- Dates: 4 September–25 November 2017
- Administrator: Codemasters; Formula One Management; FIA
- Tournament format(s): Qualification: Two challenges Semi-Finals: Four heats each contest two races Final: Three race championship
- Venue: Qualification: Worldwide; Semi-Finals: Gfinity Arena; Final: Yas Marina Circuit

Final positions
- Champions: (United Kingdom) Brendon Leigh
- 1st runners-up: (Chile) Fabrizio Donoso Delgado
- 2nd runners-up: (Germany) Sven Zürner

The 2017 FIA Formula One Esports Series was the inaugural season of the Formula One Esports Series. It started on September 4, 2017, and ended on November 25, 2017. It was held on Formula One's official 2017 game.

== Qualification ==
Qualification was held over two stages. These stages were:

- Stage One: Players were required to score a podium finish in a Force India VJM10 at Monza, starting in 6th position with 5 laps remaining. It is a points based event, with players awarded a score based on skill, speed and difficulty/assist settings. Players also earned points to their score by driving cleanly. This challenge was available from 4–12 September 2017.
- Stage Two: Players were required to win a race in a Red Bull RB13 at Suzuka, starting in 5th position with 5 laps remaining. Players scored points in the same manner as in the first stage. This challenge was available from 18 to 26 September 2017.

A total of 63,827 drivers took part in the qualifying stages, with 40 progressing to the semi-finals. 10 came from each of the platforms (Xbox One, PlayStation 4 and PC), 9 came from F1 affiliated leagues, and 1 was a specially-selected wildcard.

== Semi-final ==
The semi-final was held at the Gfinity Arena in London, the United Kingdom on 10 October 2017. Drivers were split into 4 groups of 10, and competed in two heat races - one at the Silverstone Circuit and the other at the Autódromo José Carlos Pace. The top 5 drivers on points in each heat after these two races progressed to the final.

=== Results ===
Heat 1

Pos	Driver	(United Kingdom) SIL		(Brazil) JCP		Total
Pos	Driver	Pos	Pts	Pos	Pts	Total
1	(United Kingdom) Brendon Leigh	1st	25	1st	25	50
2	(Italy) Nicolò Fioroni	2nd	18	3rd	15	33
3	(Brazil) Igor Fraga	4th	12	2nd	18	30
4	(Poland) Patryk Krutyj	3rd	15	5th	10	25
5	(Germany) Maximilian Benecke	9th	2	4th	12	14
6	(Italy) Amos Laurito	6th	8	7th	6	14
7	(United Kingdom) Isaac Price	7th	6	6th	8	14
8	(Spain) Miguel Ballester	5th	10	10th	1	11
9	(Netherlands) Sebastian Dunkel	8th	4	9th	2	6
10	(United Kingdom) Graham Carroll	10th	1	8th	4	5

Heat 2

Pos	Driver	(United Kingdom) SIL		(Brazil) JCP		Total
Pos	Driver	Pos	Pts	Pos	Pts	Total
1	(Netherlands) Allert van der Wal	1st	25	1st	25	50
2	(Germany) Sven Zürner	2nd	18	2nd	18	36
3	(Italy) Tiziano Brioni	4th	12	3rd	15	27
4	(Venezuela) Gianfranco Giglioli	3rd	15	5th	10	25
5	(United Kingdom) Harry Jacks	5th	10	4th	12	22
6	(Finland) Olli Pahkala	8th	4	6th	8	12
7	(Switzerland) Christoph Holstein	7th	6	7th	6	12
8	(Hungary) Patrik Blazsán	6th	8	9th	2	10
9	(Norway) Jarl Teien	9th	2	8th	4	6
10	(United Kingdom) Daniel Forrester	10th	1	10th	1	2

Heat 3

Pos	Driver	(United Kingdom) SIL		(Brazil) JCP		Total
Pos	Driver	Pos	Pts	Pos	Pts	Total
1	(United Kingdom) Sonuç Saltunç	1st	25	1st	25	50
2	(Germany) Cedric Thomé	2nd	18	3rd	15	33
3	(Turkey) Cem Bölükbaşı	3rd	15	2nd	18	33
4	(Italy) Alberto Foltran	4th	12	5th	10	22
5	(Chile) Fabrizio Donoso Delgado	5th	10	6th	8	18
6	(Italy) Rosario Sinacori	8th	4	4th	12	16
7	(France) Nicolas Annerose	6th	8	9th	2	10
8	(Italy) Pino Macrì	7th	6	8th	4	10
9	(Hungary) Daniel Bereznay	10th	1	7th	6	7
10	(Spain) Nestor Garcìa Valle	9th	2	10th	1	3

Heat 4

Pos	Driver	(United Kingdom) SIL		(Brazil) JCP		Total
Pos	Driver	Pos	Pts	Pos	Pts	Total
1	(Germany) Patrik Holzmann	1st	25	1st	25	50
2	(Denmark) Frederik Rasmussen	2nd	18	3rd	15	33
3	(Finland) Joni Törmälä	4th	12	2nd	18	30
4	(Denmark) Mads Sørensen	5th	10	4th	12	22
5	(United Kingdom) Salih Saltunç	6th	8	5th	10	18
6	(Germany) Marcel Kiefer	3rd	15	10th	1	16
7	(Italy) Giuseppe de Fuoco	7th	6	6th	8	14
8	(United Kingdom) Connor McDonagh	8th	4	7th	6	10
9	(France) Thibaut Suner	10th	1	8th	4	5
10	(Germany) Jonas Rütten	9th	2	9th	2	4

== Final ==
The final was held as a support category to the 2017 Abu Dhabi Grand Prix, over 24–25 November 2017. Races were held at the Circuit Gilles Villeneuve, Circuit de Spa-Francorchamps and Yas Marina Circuit. Drivers scored points in the same structure as the regular Formula One season for the first two races, and scored points in a 45-38-34-29-24-20-18-16-14-12-10-9-8-7-6-5-4-3-2-1 structure in the third.

=== Results ===
Pos	Driver	(Canada) CGV		(Belgium) CSF		(United Arab Emirates) YMC		Total
Pos	Driver	Pos	Pts	Pos	Pts	Pos	Pts	Total
1	(United Kingdom) Brendon Leigh	1st	25	8th	4	1st	45	74
2	(Chile) Fabrizio Donoso Delgado	4th	12	2nd	18	2nd	38	68
3	(Germany) Sven Zürner	2nd	18	4th	12	3rd	34	64
4	(Germany) Patrik Holzmann	7th	6	5th	10	4th	29	45
5	(Turkey) Cem Bölükbaşı	19th	0	1st	25	11th	10	35
6	(Denmark) Frederik Rasmussen	3rd	15	14th	0	6th	20	35
7	(Netherlands) Allert van der Wal	15th	0	3rd	15	7th	18	33
8	(Venezuela) Gianfranco Giglioli	6th	8	10th	1	5th	24	33
9	(United Kingdom) Harry Jacks	8th	4	7th	6	9th	14	24
10	(Finland) Joni Törmälä	12th	0	12th	0	8th	16	16
11	(Italy) Nicolò Fioroni	5th	10	17th	0	16th	5	15
12	(United Kingdom) Salih Saltunç	18th	0	16th	0	10th	12	12
13	(Germany) Maximilian Benecke	20th	0	6th	8	18th	3	11
14	(Poland) Patryk Krutyj	13th	0	20th	0	12th	9	9
15	(Denmark) Mads Sørensen	9th	2	9th	2	17th	4	8
16	(Italy) Alberto Foltran	17th	0	15th	0	13th	8	8
17	(Germany) Cedric Thomé	11th	0	13th	0	14th	7	7
18	(Brazil) Igor Fraga	14th	0	18th	0	15th	6	6
19	(Italy) Tiziano Brioni	16th	0	11th	0	19th	2	2
20	(United Kingdom) Sonuç Saltunç	10th	1	19th	0	20th	1	2
