= 2021 Formula One Esports Series =

Racing eSports Series

Tournament information
- Sport: Formula One Esports Series
- Location: Qualification: Worldwide; Pro Draft: Online; Pro Championship: Online
- Dates: 13 October–16 December 2021
- Administrator: Codemasters; Formula One Management; FIA
- Tournament format(s): Qualification: Online; Pro Draft: Driver's selection Pro Championship: Twelve race championship
- Venue: Qualification: Worldwide; Pro Draft: Online; Pro Championship: Online

Final positions
- Champions: (Netherlands) Jarno Opmeer (Germany) Mercedes-AMG Petronas Esports Team

The 2021 Formula One Esports Series was the fifth season of the Formula One Esports Series. It started on 13 October 2021, and ended on 16 December 2021. It was held in Formula One's official 2021 game. Same as the previous year, the championship was held online due to COVID-19 pandemic and streamed on the official F1 YouTube Channel.

Jarno Opmeer and Red Bull Racing Esports entered the season as the reigning champion, having won the Drivers' and Team's Championship title respectively in 2020. Jarno Opmeer successfully defended the Drivers' Championship title for the second consecutive year, while his new team, Mercedes-AMG Petronas Esports Team secured the Teams' Championship title for the first time since 2018.

== Teams and drivers ==
Team	Race drivers		
Team	No.	Driver name	Rounds
(Switzerland) Alfa Romeo Racing ORLEN F1 Esports Team	30; 83; N.A.	(Germany) Simon Weigang (Slovakia) Filip Prešnajder (Netherlands) Thijmen Schütte	All; 2–7, 9–11; 1, 8, 12
(France) Alpine Esports Team	40; 8; 80	(France) Nicolas Longuet (Chile) Fabrizio Donoso (Hungary) Patrik Sipos	1–7, 9, 11–12; 1–2, 4–5, 7–8, 10–12; 3, 6, 8–10
(United Kingdom) Aston Martin Cognizant Esports Team	88; 92; 79	(United Kingdom) Lucas Blakeley (Italy) Daniele Haddad (United Kingdom) Shanaka Clay	All; 1–9, 11–12; 10
(Italy) Ferrari Driver Academy Esports Team	95; 72; 29	(Italy) David Tonizza (United Kingdom) Brendon Leigh (Italy) Domenico Lovece	1-11; All; 12
(United Kingdom) McLaren Shadow	20; 12; 32	(Iran) Bari Broumand (Hungary) Daniel Bereznay (United Kingdom) Josh Idowu	All; 1, 3, 5–7, 9; 2, 4, 8, 10–12
(Germany) Mercedes-AMG Petronas Esports Team	34; 95; N.A.	(Netherlands) Jarno Opmeer (Spain) Dani Moreno (Netherlands) Bono Huis	All; All; Not Competed
(Austria) Red Bull Racing Esports	19; 24; N.A.	(Denmark) Frederik Rasmussen (Germany) Marcel Kiefer (Germany) Liam Parnell	All; All; Not Competed
(Italy) Scuderia AlphaTauri F1 Esports Team	51; 13; N.A.	(Finland) Joni Törmälä (United Kingdom) Sebastian Job (Italy) Dario Iemmulo	All; 1–9,11–12; 10
(United States) Uralkali Haas F1 Team Esports	2; 48; N.A.	(Germany) Cedric Thomé (Netherlands) Matthijs van Erven (France) Samuel Libeert	All; All; Not Competed
(United Kingdom) Williams Esports	21; 53; 23	(Spain) Álvaro Carretón (Greece) Michael Romanidis (Italy) Alessio Di Capua	All; 1–2, 5–7, 9–11; 3–4, 8, 12

== Calendar ==
Round	Event	Circuit	Distance	Date	Broadcast
1	Event One	Bahrain International Circuit, Sakhir	20 Laps	13 October	2021 F1 Esports Pro Championship: Rounds 1-2 on YouTube
2	Event One	(China) Shanghai International Circuit, Shanghai	20 Laps	13 October	2021 F1 Esports Pro Championship: Rounds 1-2 on YouTube
3	Event One	(Austria) Red Bull Ring, Spielberg	25 Laps	14 October	2021 F1 Esports Pro Championship: Rounds 3 on YouTube
4	Event Two	(United Kingdom) Silverstone Circuit, Silverstone	18 Laps	27 October	2021 F1 Esports Pro Championship: Rounds 4-5 on YouTube
5	Event Two	(Italy) Autodromo Nazionale di Monza, Monza	19 Laps	27 October	2021 F1 Esports Pro Championship: Rounds 4-5 on YouTube
6	Event Two	(Belgium) Circuit de Spa-Francorchamps, Stavelot	15 Laps	28 October	2021 F1 Esports Pro Championship: Rounds 6 on YouTube
7	Event Three	(Portugal) Autódromo Internacional do Algarve, Portimão	23 Laps	24 November	2021 F1 Esports Pro Championship: Rounds 7-8 on YouTube
8	Event Three	(Netherlands) Circuit Zandvoort, Zandvoort	25 Laps	24 November	2021 F1 Esports Pro Championship: Rounds 7-8 on YouTube
9	Event Three	(United States) Circuit of the Americas, Austin, Texas	20 Laps	25 November	2021 F1 Esports Pro Championship: Rounds 9 on YouTube
10	Grand Final	(Italy) Autodromo Internazionale Enzo e Dino Ferrari, Imola	22 Laps	15 December	2021 F1 Esports Pro Championship: Rounds 10-11 on YouTube
11	Grand Final	Autódromo Hermanos Rodríguez, Mexico City	25 Laps	15 December	2021 F1 Esports Pro Championship: Rounds 10-11 on YouTube
12	Grand Final	(Brazil) Autódromo José Carlos Pace, São Paulo	25 Laps	16 December	2021 F1 Esports Pro Championship: The FINAL Round! on YouTube

== Results ==
=== Season summary ===
Round	Circuit	Pole position	Fastest lap	Winning driver	Winning team
1	Bahrain International Circuit, Sakhir	(France) Nicolas Longuet	(Finland) Joni Törmälä	(United Kingdom) Lucas Blakeley	(United Kingdom) Aston Martin Cognizant Esports Team
2	(China) Shanghai International Circuit, Shanghai	(Iran) Bari Broumand	(France) Nicolas Longuet	(Netherlands) Jarno Opmeer	(Germany) Mercedes-AMG Petronas Esports Team
3	(Austria) Red Bull Ring, Spielberg	(Netherlands) Jarno Opmeer	(Netherlands) Jarno Opmeer	(Netherlands) Jarno Opmeer	(Germany) Mercedes-AMG Petronas Esports Team
4	(United Kingdom) Silverstone Circuit, Silverstone	(Denmark) Frederik Rasmussen	(United Kingdom) Sebastian Job	(Denmark) Frederik Rasmussen	(Austria) Red Bull Racing Esports
5	(Italy) Autodromo Nazionale di Monza, Monza	(Netherlands) Jarno Opmeer	(Finland) Joni Törmälä	(Germany) Marcel Kiefer	(Austria) Red Bull Racing Esports
6	(Belgium) Circuit de Spa-Francorchamps, Stavelot	(Italy) David Tonizza	(Spain) Dani Moreno	(Denmark) Frederik Rasmussen	(Austria) Red Bull Racing Esports
7	(Portugal) Autódromo Internacional do Algarve, Portimão	(United Kingdom) Lucas Blakeley	(Slovakia) Filip Prešnajder	(United Kingdom) Lucas Blakeley	(United Kingdom) Aston Martin Cognizant Esports Team
8	(Netherlands) Circuit Zandvoort, Zandvoort	(Iran) Bari Broumand	(Spain) Álvaro Carretón	(Spain) Dani Moreno	(Germany) Mercedes-AMG Petronas Esports Team
9	(United States) Circuit of the Americas, Austin, Texas	(France) Nicolas Longuet	(Italy) Daniele Haddad	(Netherlands) Jarno Opmeer	(Germany) Mercedes-AMG Petronas Esports Team
10	(Italy) Autodromo Internazionale Enzo e Dino Ferrari, Imola	(United Kingdom) Josh Idowu	(Germany) Marcel Kiefer	(Italy) David Tonizza	(Italy) Ferrari Driver Academy Esports Team
11	Autódromo Hermanos Rodríguez, Mexico City	(Denmark) Frederik Rasmussen	(Netherlands) Matthijs van Erven	(Netherlands) Jarno Opmeer	(Germany) Mercedes-AMG Petronas Esports Team
12	(Brazil) Autódromo José Carlos Pace, São Paulo	(France) Nicolas Longuet	(United Kingdom) Brendon Leigh	(Denmark) Frederik Rasmussen	(Austria) Red Bull Racing Esports

== Championship Standings ==
=== Scoring system ===
Points were awarded to the top 10 classified finishers in the race and one point was given to the driver who set the fastest lap inside the top ten. No extra points are awarded to the pole-sitter.

Position	1st	2nd	3rd	4th	5th	6th	7th	8th	9th	10th	FL
Points	25	18	15	12	10	8	6	4	2	1	1

In the event of a tie at the conclusion of the championship, a count-back system is used as a tie-breaker, with a driver's/constructor's best result used to decide the standings.

=== Drivers' Championship standings ===
Pos.	Driver	BHR (Bahrain)	CHN (China)	AUT (Austria)	GBR (United Kingdom)	ITA (Italy)	BEL (Belgium)	POR (Portugal)	NLD (Netherlands)	USA (United States)	EMI (Italy)	MEX (Mexico)	BRA (Brazil)	Points
1	(Netherlands) Jarno Opmeer	4	1	1^{P}^{F}	9	2^{P}	2	7	6	1	2	1	4	195
2	(Denmark) Frederik Rasmussen	7	17	2	1^{P}	8	1	2	2	2	3	3^{P}	1	187
3	(United Kingdom) Lucas Blakeley	1	4	4	3	3	6	1^{P}	3	6	10	6	2	162
4	(Spain) Dani Moreno	5	8	10	2	7	16^{F}	4	1	7	7	4	Ret	100
5	(Iran) Bari Broumand	6	5^{P}	3	5	6	8	10	4^{P}	4	18	2	17	98
6	(Italy) David Tonizza	9	14	5	10	15	3^{P}	6	5	5	1	9		83
7	(Germany) Marcel Kiefer	8	3	16	7	1	4	9	10	9	20^{F}	8	14	71
8	(France) Nicolas Longuet	2^{P}	18^{F}	9	4	12	5	12		3^{P}		7	7^{P}	69
9	(Chile) Fabrizio Donoso	10	2		17	4		3	16		14	17	19	46
10	(United Kingdom) Brendon Leigh	12	6	8	6	19	18	17	9	14	5	5	18^{F}	42
11	(Finland) Joni Törmälä	19^{F}	16	19	8	20^{F}	11	5	7	11	4	10	13	33
12	(United Kingdom) Sebastian Job	17	11	15	18^{F}	5	7	16	11	10		11	3	32
13	(Spain) Álvaro Carretón	3	Ret	6	20	10	12	19	19^{F}	8	19	16	8	32
14	(Greece) Michael Romanidis	20	9			16	14	8		18	6	12		14
15	(United Kingdom) Josh Idowu		12		11				18		11^{P}	14	5	10
16	(Germany) Simon Weigang	13	Ret	7	13	14	9	19	14	20	9	13	15	10
17	(Italy) Daniele Haddad	11	7	Ret	19	9	10	11	20	19^{F}		15	12	9
18	(Netherlands) Matthijs van Erven	15	13	11	12	13	15	15	15	17	16	20^{F}	6	8
19	(Hungary) Patrik Sipos			17			17		8	16	8			8
20	(Germany) Cedric Thomé	16	15	18	14	18	13	18	17	13	15	19	9	2
21	(Netherlands) Thijmen Schütte	18							12				10	1
22	(Slovakia) Filip Prešnajder		10	14	16	17	Ret	20^{F}		12	12	18		1
23	(Italy) Domenico Lovece												11	0
24	(Hungary) Daniel Bereznay	14		12		11	Ret	14		15				0
25	(Italy) Dario Iemmulo										13			0
26	(Italy) Alessio di Capua			13	15				13				16	0
27	(United Kingdom) Shanaka Clay										17			0
Pos.	Driver	BHR (Bahrain)	CHN (China)	AUT (Austria)	GBR (United Kingdom)	ITA (Italy)	BEL (Belgium)	POR (Portugal)	NLD (Netherlands)	USA (United States)	EMI (Italy)	MEX (Mexico)	BRA (Brazil)	Points

Key
Colour	Result
Gold	Winner
Silver	Second place
Bronze	Third place
Green	Other points position
Blue	Other classified position
Blue	Not classified, finished (NC)
Purple	Not classified, retired (Ret)
Red	Did not qualify (DNQ)
Red	Did not pre-qualify (DNPQ)
Black	Disqualified (DSQ)
White	Did not start (DNS)
White	Race cancelled (C)
Blank	Did not enter
Annotation	Meaning
P	Pole position
F	Fastest lap

=== Teams' Championship standings ===
Pos.	Team	BHR (Bahrain)	CHN (China)	AUT (Austria)	GBR (United Kingdom)	ITA (Italy)	BEL (Belgium)	POR (Portugal)	NLD (Netherlands)	USA (United States)	EMI (Italy)	MEX (Mexico)	BRA (Brazil)	Points
1	(Germany) Mercedes-AMG Petronas Esports Team	4	1	1^{P}^{F}	2	2^{P}	2	4	1	1	2	1	4	295
1	(Germany) Mercedes-AMG Petronas Esports Team	5	8	10	9	7	16^{F}	7	6	7	7	4	Ret	295
2	(Austria) Red Bull Racing Esports	7	3	2	1^{P}	1	1	2	2	2	3	3^{P}	1	258
2	(Austria) Red Bull Racing Esports	8	17	16	7	8	4	9	10	9	20^{F}	8	14	258
3	(United Kingdom) Aston Martin Cognizant Esports Team	1	4	4	3	3	6	1^{P}	3	6	10	6	2	171
3	(United Kingdom) Aston Martin Cognizant Esports Team	11	7	Ret	19	9	10	11	20	19^{F}	17	15	12	171
4	(Italy) Ferrari Driver Academy Esports Team	9	6	5	6	15	3^{P}	6	5	5	1	5	11	125
4	(Italy) Ferrari Driver Academy Esports Team	12	14	8	10	19	18	17	9	14	5	9	18^{F}	125
5	(France) Alpine Esports Team	2^{P}	2	9	4	4	5	3	8	3^{P}	8	7	7^{P}	123
5	(France) Alpine Esports Team	10	18^{F}	17	17	12	17	12	16	16	14	17	19	123
6	(United Kingdom) McLaren Shadow	6	5^{P}	3	5	6	8	10	4^{P}	4	11^{P}	2	5	108
6	(United Kingdom) McLaren Shadow	14	12	12	11	11	Ret	14	18	15	18	14	17	108
7	(Italy) Scuderia AlphaTauri F1 Esports Team	17	11	15	8	5	7	5	7	10	4	10	3	65
7	(Italy) Scuderia AlphaTauri F1 Esports Team	19^{F}	16	19	18^{F}	20^{F}	11	16	11	11	13	11	13	65
8	(United Kingdom) Williams Esports	3	9	6	15	10	12	8	13	8	6	12	8	46
8	(United Kingdom) Williams Esports	20	Ret	13	20	16	14	13	19^{F}	18	19	16	16	46
9	(Switzerland) Alfa Romeo Racing ORLEN F1 Esports Team	13	10	7	13	14	9	19	12	12	9	13	10	12
9	(Switzerland) Alfa Romeo Racing ORLEN F1 Esports Team	18	Ret	14	16	17	Ret	20^{F}	14	20	12	18	15	12
10	(United States) Uralkali Haas F1 Team Esports	15	13	11	12	13	13	15	15	13	15	19	6	10
10	(United States) Uralkali Haas F1 Team Esports	16	15	18	14	18	15	18	17	17	16	20^{F}	9	10
Pos.	Team	BHR (Bahrain)	CHN (China)	AUT (Austria)	GBR (United Kingdom)	ITA (Italy)	BEL (Belgium)	POR (Portugal)	NLD (Netherlands)	USA (United States)	EMI (Italy)	MEX (Mexico)	BRA (Brazil)	Points

Key
Colour	Result
Gold	Winner
Silver	Second place
Bronze	Third place
Green	Other points position
Blue	Other classified position
Blue	Not classified, finished (NC)
Purple	Not classified, retired (Ret)
Red	Did not qualify (DNQ)
Red	Did not pre-qualify (DNPQ)
Black	Disqualified (DSQ)
White	Did not start (DNS)
White	Race cancelled (C)
Blank	Did not enter
Annotation	Meaning
P	Pole position
F	Fastest lap

Notes:

- The standings are sorted by best result, rows are not related to the drivers. In case of tie on points, the best positions achieved determined the outcome.
