= F1 2017 (video game) =

2017 video game

- Cover art featuring from left to right: Felipe Massa, Daniel Ricciardo, Sebastian Vettel, Lewis Hamilton, Max Verstappen, Fernando Alonso, Sergio Pérez and Stoffel Vandoorne.
- Developer: Codemasters Birmingham
- Publisher: Codemasters
- Director: Lee Mather
- Composer: Mark Knight
- Series: F1
- Engine: EGO Engine 4.0
- Platforms: PlayStation 4 Xbox One; Microsoft Windows macOS; Linux
- Release: Win, Mac, PS4, Xbox One; 25 August 2017; Linux; 2 November 2017
- Genre: Racing
- Modes: Single-player, multiplayer

F1 2017 is the official video game of the 2017 FIA Formula One World Championship, released for PlayStation 4, Xbox One, and Windows on 25 August. The game includes all of the twenty circuits, twenty drivers and ten teams competing in the season. The macOS version, developed by Feral Interactive, was released simultaneously with the other versions, a first in the series' history. The Linux version, also by Feral Interactive, was released on 2 November.

The game featured the initial driver line ups for the 2017 season; substitute drivers Jenson Button, Antonio Giovinazzi, Pierre Gasly, Brendon Hartley and Paul di Resta, although all driving in FIA Formula One races during the 2017 season were not included in the game.

== Features ==
The game features in-game commentary from David Croft and Anthony Davidson. The game also features an expanded team management mode, which offers players more control over research and development of car parts. Engine components and gearboxes are subject to wear and will ultimately fail, with players receiving grid penalties for exceeding their quota of components.

The Fédération Internationale de l'Automobile (FIA) - the governing body of international motorsport - supports F1 2017 as a platform for eSports, following similar moves by Formula E and the World Rally Championship. A variety of race formats are available to players after the sport's commercial holders expressed an interest in using gaming to trial potential race formats. The game also features classic cars, which were last included in F1 2013 - drawn from 1988 to 2010.

The game also included a competition for players to design their own racing helmets, with the seven winning designs included in the game.

It was the first game to be used in the Formula One eSports Series, which also debuted in 2017.

== Reception ==
Reception

Aggregate score
Aggregator	Score
Metacritic	86/100

Review scores
Publication	Score
GamesMaster	84%
GameSpot	9/10
GamesRadar+	4/5
IGN	8.9/10
PC Gamer (UK)	88%
Polygon	8/10
The Daily Telegraph	5/5

The initial reception to the game was positive, with motorsport magazine Autosport praising it for adding depth to all of the features introduced in F1 2016. The Daily Telegraph praised the game for its updates on previous titles, calling it one of Codemasters' best games. IGN was similarly complimentary for being faithful to the details of its subject, while GameSpot's review echoed Autosport's response. GamesMaster said it was "a superb, technical racer", and also said that F1 fans will love the career mode, but be disappointed with the classic content.

The game reached number 2 in the UK PS4 sales chart, behind Uncharted: The Lost Legacy, but topped the XO charts. The PlayStation 4 version sold 7,190 copies in Japan in its debut week, placing it at 11 on the sales charts. It reached number 2 in Australia, and 4 in New Zealand.

Alphr put it at number 6 on their list of the best racing games on PS4 2017. The game was nominated for "Best Racing Game in IGN's Best of 2017 Awards, and for "eSports Game of the Year" at the 2018 SXSW Gaming Awards; and won the award for "Best Racing Game" at The Independent Game Developers' Association Awards 2018.

== Censorship ==
- Williams' Martini & Rossi red color has been replaced with blue stripes.
