= Cem Bölükbaşı =

Turkish racing driver (born 1998)

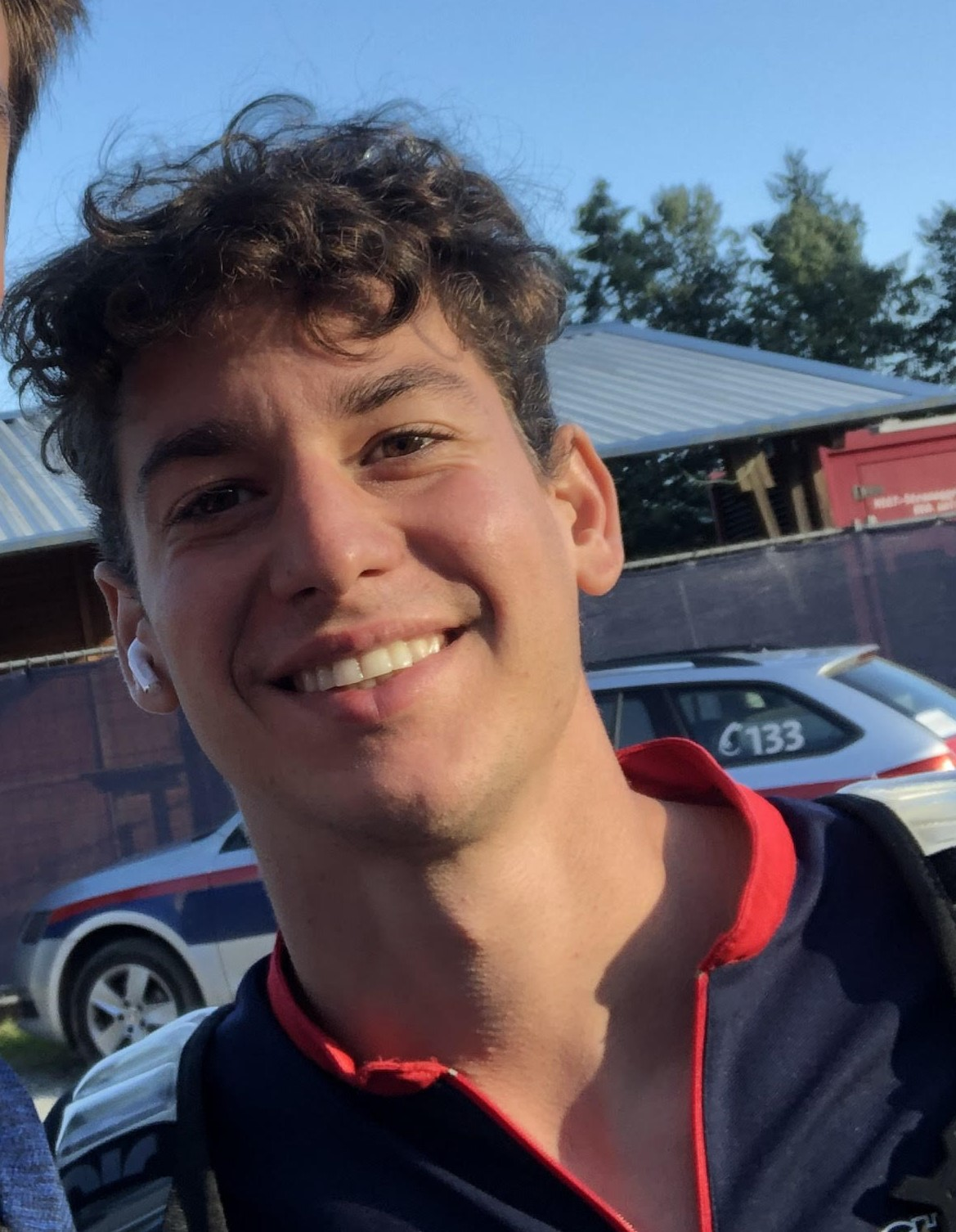
- Bölükbaşı in 2022
- Nationality: (Turkey) Turkish
- Born: 9 February 1998 (age 28) Istanbul, Turkey

European Le Mans Series career
- Debut season: 2024
- Current team: Nielsen Racing
- Categorisation: FIA Bronze (2019–2020); FIA Silver (2021–)
- Car number: 24
- Former teams: DKR Engineering
- Starts: 12 (12 entries)
- Wins: 0
- Podiums: 1
- Poles: 1
- Fastest laps: 0
- Best finish: 5th in 2025 (LMP2)

Previous series
- 2023 2022 2021 2019–20 2017–19: Super Formula Championship; FIA Formula 2 Championship; F3 Asian Championship; GT4 European Series; Formula One eSports Series

Cem Bölükbaşı (Turkish pronunciation: [dʒæm bœlykˈbaʃɯ]; born 9 February 1998) is a Turkish racing driver and former sim racer who competes in the 2025 European Le Mans Series for Nielsen Racing. He previously drove for DKR Engineering in the 2024 European Le Mans Series.

Bölükbaşı started motocross racing at the age of 5, and won the Turkish Championship a year later. Starting his professional career in esports in 2017, he joined G2 Esports FA Racing and competed in several Formula One eSports Series. He also won the inaugural championship of the Formula Renault Esport Series in 2020.

Making a switch back to real cars in May 2019, Bölükbaşı started racing in the GT4 European Series, and made his open-wheeler debut in October the same year in Formula Renault Eurocup. Throughout the first months of 2021, he competed in the F3 Asian Championship and finished as the runner-up in the rookie standings. He competed part-time in the 2021 Euroformula Open Championship and won twice. After testing Formula 2 cars at the end of 2021, he was picked to drive in the 2022 Formula 2 Championship with Charouz Racing System.

Bölükbaşı left Charouz Racing System before the Spa-Francorchamps Formula 2 round on 27 August 2022. The team argued there was a major breach of agreement from Bölükbaşı’s side, while he argued they could not reach a consensus on financial contract terms. Bölükbaşı announced that he views his withdrawal unfair.

== Early and personal life ==
Realizing his passion for speed when he was only six years old, Bölükbaşı's father took him to the motocross track. He began to compete in motocross when he was five years old, and won the Turkish Championship at the age of six.

In 2022, Bölükbaşı said that his favourite Formula One driver is Fernando Alonso, adding that Alonso "as a person and his movements on track" made the Spanish driver interesting to him.

== Career ==
=== Esports ===
In late 2017, Bölükbaşı was selected to join G2 Esports FA Racing, in which he would compete in various simracing competitions throughout 2018. Bölükbaşı raced for McLaren in the 2017 Formula One eSports Series, which he finished fifth in the standings with 35 points and a race win under his name. In the 2018 Formula One eSports Series, he switched to Toro Rosso and participated in four out of the ten races, finishing 12th with 32 points. In the 2019 Formula One eSports Series, he participated in nine out of the twelve races, finishing 21st with four points. During the 2020 lockdowns, Bölükbaşı competed in several virtual races, including winning the inaugural championship of the Formula Renault Esport Series.

=== GT4 ===
In May 2019, Borusan Otomotiv Motorsport announced that Bölükbaşı would race in the 2019 GT4 European Series. He was able to get a second-place finish in the Misano round and finished the championship in 17th overall. Bölükbaşı continued to race in the series full-time in 2020. He got three pole positions and three race wins and finished the season overall 2nd.

=== Formula Renault Eurocup ===
Bölükbaşı made his Formula debut in the 2019 Formula Renault Eurocup with M2 Competition. As a guest driver he raced only in the Hockenheim round, finishing 16th in race 1 and retiring from the second race.

==== Formula 3 ====
In January 2021, BlackArts Racing announced that Bölükbaşı would drive for the team in the 2021 F3 Asian Championship. He scored points in thirteen of the fifteen races and with a best race result of fifth, finished ninth in the overall standings.

Bölükbaşı also raced in the rebranded 2022 season, this time with Evans GP. Bölükbaşı retired from all three races in round 1, with the crash in race 3 causing major damage to the rear of his car. The damage could not be repaired until the second round the week after, causing him to miss all three races. In early February, just before round 3, Bölükbaşı announced that he would not continue racing in the series, as his chances of getting FIA Super Licence points were slim.

==== Euroformula Open ====
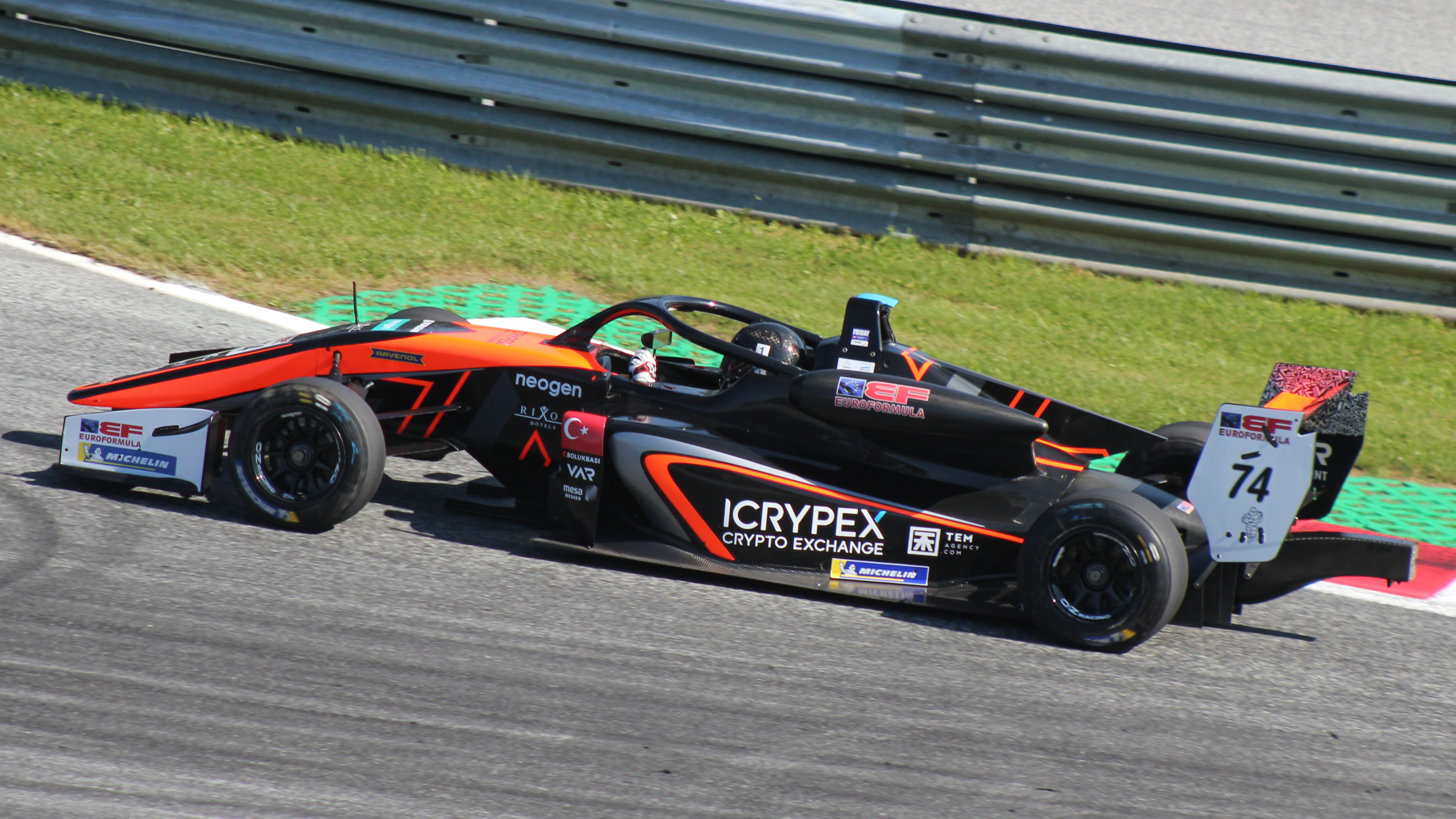
Bölükbaşı driving the Euroformula Open car in 2021

On 3 July 2021, it was announced that Bölükbaşı would join the 2021 Euroformula Open Championship with Van Amersfoort Racing. He made his debut in the series during the fourth round at Hungaroring. He won the first race in the round, becoming the first esport driver to win a race in formula series. Bölükbaşı also finished third in the second race. The third race was run on a wet track, and he finished in seventh place.

In round 5 at Imola, he qualified third. In race 1, he ran in second place before making a mistake with three laps to go and finished third. In race 2, he started fourth as positions in the top-six were reversed. He got into third after the start, but was later overtaken by Jak Crawford, and finished the race in fourth place. Bölükbaşı started race 3 in seventh, but collided with teammate Rafael Villagómez, causing both of them to retire.

Round 6 was at the Red Bull Ring, where Bölükbaşı started race 1 in fourth. He fell back to fifth at the start and finished the race in that position. However, he was promoted back into fourth after a post-race penalty for Reshad de Gerus. He started race 2 in third, and finished in second place behind Nazim Azman. He finished the final race of the round in sixth place. In round 7 at Monza, he started race 1 in tenth, and finished in third place, as well as getting the fastest lap. Race 2 was run in wet conditions, and Bölükbaşı finished in second place. In race 3, he crossed the line first, but was given a three-second time penalty for cutting a corner, which demoted him to second.

In round 8 at Circuit de Barcelona-Catalunya, Bölükbaşı qualified on pole and led the race until the finish, winning his second race in the series. In race 2, he started sixth and got into fourth after the start, and finished the race in that position. He started race 3 in fifth, and also finished in fourth place. Bölükbaşı finished the season fifth in the overall standings, despite missing the first three rounds.

=== Formula Regional ===
Bölükbaşı was signed by Evans GP to contest the first round of the 2022 Formula Regional Asian Championship. Ending the weekend by retiring in all races, his last race ended in a huge startline crash, which caused massive car damage. Due to the damage, he was unable to partake in the second round and later withdrew from the championship.

=== Formula 2 ===
On 14 October 2021, Bölükbaşı tested Formula Two machinery for the first time at the Brno Circuit, driving a Dallara GP2/11 which was used in the GP2 Series from 2011 to 2016 and in the FIA Formula 2 Championship in 2017. He drove a Formula 2 car for the first time in an official session during the 2021 post-season test with Van Amersfoort Racing on 18 December 2021, finishing 22nd and last. On 12 January 2022, it was officially announced that he would compete in the 2022 Formula 2 Championship as a Charouz Racing System driver.

==== 2022 season ====
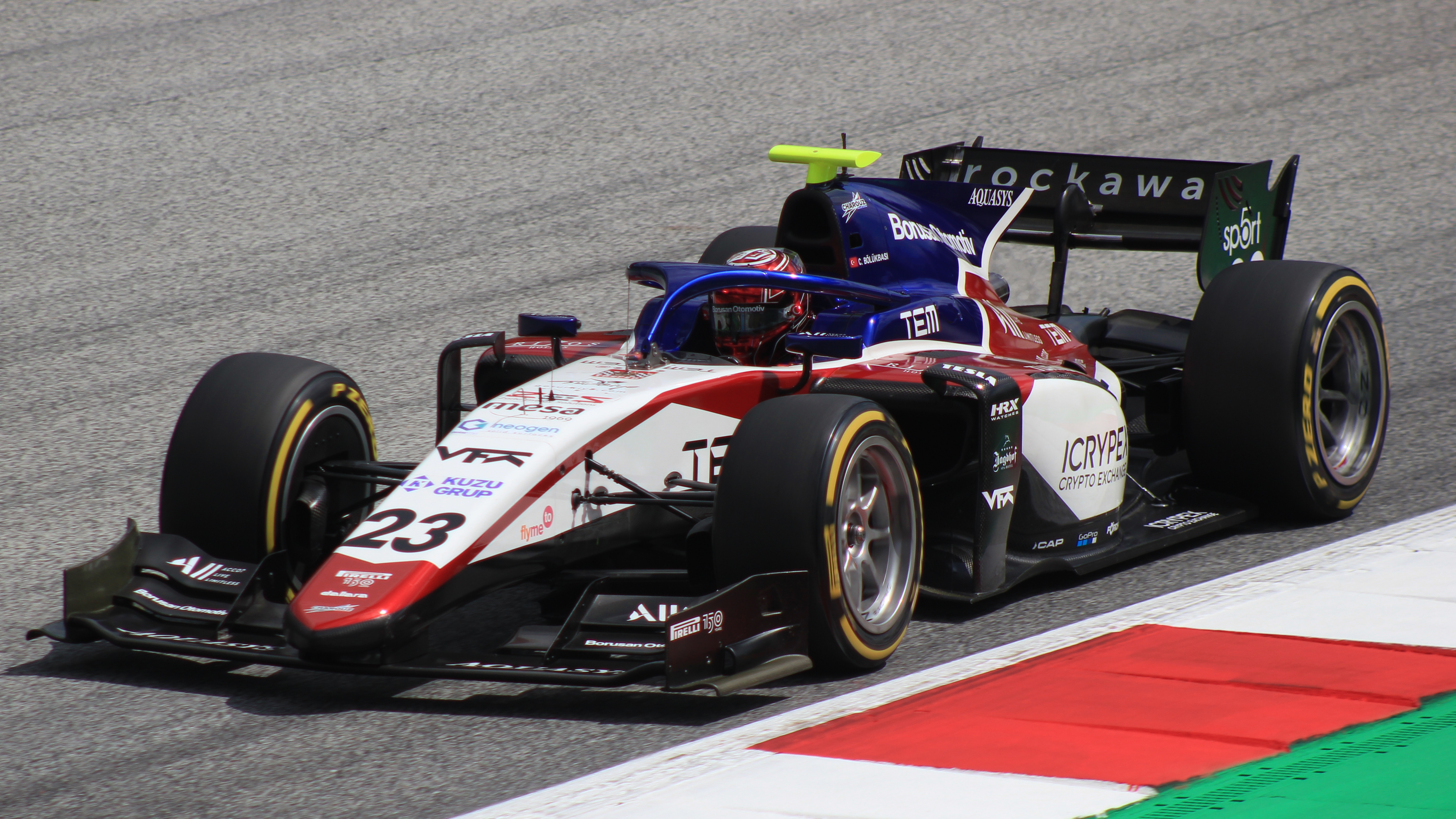
Bölükbasi driving the Dallara F2 2018 during the 2022 Spielberg Formula 2 round.

For round 1 in Bahrain, Bölükbaşı qualified 20th in his first Formula 2 qualifying session. During the sprint race, he gained two positions at the start. He later overtook two more cars and finished in 14th, also ahead of Marcus Armstrong and Theo Pourchaire, both of whom retired from the race. In the feature race, Bölükbaşı gained one position at the start and was in 19th place. He pitted early on lap 9 and set the fastest lap multiple times. He was running as high as 12th at one point with the undercut, but he was passed by drivers on fresher tyres. Following a late-race crash, Bölükbaşı made a pitstop under the safety car, and two other drivers having issues in the pitlane helped him to get back up into 12th. On the restart however, Bölükbaşı spun and ended the race in 15th position. During the practice session of round 2 in Jeddah, Bölükbaşı crashed into the barrier. He was hospitalized for routine checks, which resulted in him missing qualifying. It was later determined that he had suffered from a concussion, and was declared unfit to race. Charouz withdrew him from the event. During the first day of the in-season Formula 2 test in Circuit de Barcelona, Bölükbaşı crashed into a concrete wall. He missed the rest of testing and flew back to Turkey, where it was revealed that he had a broken rib. He was replaced by David Beckmann for the next round in Imola.

Bölükbaşı returned to racing in the Barcelona round. He qualified in 21st place. In the sprint race, Bölükbaşı gained five positions on the first lap and got up into 16th, but dropped down to 18th place as the race went on. In the feature race, Bölükbaşı again had a good first lap and gained seven positions. Following contact between Jehan Daruvala and Ayumu Iwasa, he got up into 12th. He came into the pits after the safety car for a tyre change but had a slow pitstop, finishing the race in 20th place. In the Monaco round, Bölükbaşı qualified 21st originally, but started the sprint race in 18th. He gained 6 positions in the first lap. He had a small contact with Richard Verschoor later in the race, but managed to finish in 12th. He was due to start in 20th in the feature race, but Roy Nissany and Liam Lawson stalling on the grid on the formation lap promoted him to 18th. He gained two more positions in lap 1. He was later overtaken by Verschoor, which dropped him to 17th. After some drivers pitted, Bölükbaşı got into 10th. He pitted under the safety car caused by Amaury Cordeel and came out in 15th. Following several retirements after the safety car, Bölükbaşı finished the race 11th.

During the Baku round, Bölükbaşı qualified in 21st place. In the sprint race, he got into 19th place by lap 10. Following crashes and safety cars, he was running in 12th at the race restart with one lap to go. Ralph Boschung and Calan Williams made contact at the back, and Bölükbaşı wasn't able to avoid the car of Williams, leading him to retire, but was still classified as 18th as he completed over 90% of the race distance. In the feature race, Bölükbaşı got into 15th place after lap 1. On lap 12, while running in 16th place, he was tapped by Roy Nissany, and collided with the barriers, causing both drivers to retire. Nissany was penalized for causing the collision and received a three place grid penalty for the following event. Bölükbaşı received a 5000 euro fine after his father had a "heated verbal exchange" and attempted a physical altercation with Nissany and his trainer after he called Bölükbaşı an "idiot" after the collision over the team radio. In the Silverstone round, Bölükbaşı qualified 20th. The sprint race was run in wet conditions. He got into 19th place by the end of lap 1, which is also where he finished the race. In the feature race, Bölükbaşı ran in 14th place during the safety car. He made an early pitstop, but had difficulties with getting the tyres to work and finished 18th.

In the Spielberg round, Bölükbaşı qualified 13th. In the sprint race, he started to have problems with his brakes after lap 2. He pitted later, and came out 5 laps behind the leaders, where he finished the race. In the feature race, he made contact with Liam Lawson, causing him to break his front wing and pit early. He didn't rejoin the track, and didn't finish the race. At the Le Castellet round, he qualified 22nd and last. Bölükbaşı started on the soft tyre, and climbed into 13th place on lap 1. He ran in that position until lap 18, when he made a mistake at the final corner and lost two positions. He finished the race 15th. In the feature race, he gained one position at the start. In the closing stages, he came into the pits and retired. At Budapest, Bölükbaşı qualified 16th. He lost a place at the start of the sprint race. On lap 15, he pitted for the soft tyre, and crossed the line in 17th place. A post-race penalty for Richard Verschoor promoted him back to 16th. In the feature race, he got into 13th place in lap 1, and later overtook Liam Lawson and Logan Sargeant as well. He finished the race in 13th place.

Bölükbaşı's contract was terminated by mutual consent ahead of the Spa-Francorchamps round, and he was replaced with Tatiana Calderón. On his sudden F2 departure, Bölükbaşı stated that financial issues forced him to part ways with Charouz.

=== Super Formula ===
In December 2022, following his sudden Formula 2 exit, Bölükbaşı participated in a Super Formula test alongside then Formula 2 driver Liam Lawson. In March 2023, Bölükbaşı was chosen to compete in the 2023 Super Formula Championship with TGM Grand Prix. Bölükbaşı had a difficult season, his only points came with eighth and ninth place in the first three rounds, leading him to finish 18th in the standings with five points. However he left the series after spending a season as he was replaced by Nobuharu Matsushita for 2024.

=== European Le Mans Series ===
After leaving Super Formula, Bölükbaşı found a drive to race in the 2024 European Le Mans Series for DKR Engineering.

== Karting record ==
=== Karting career summary ===
Season	Series	Team	Position
2007	Turkey Karting Championship — Mini		7th
2007	South East European Karting Zone — Mini		20th
2008	Turkey Karting Championship — Mini		9th
2009	Turkey Karting Championship — Mini		3rd
2009	South East European Karting Zone — Mini		11th
2011	Kartmasters British Grand Prix — Rotax Junior		13th
2012	Rotax Max Challenge Belgium — Junior		36th
2012	Rotax Max Euro Challenge — Junior	Paul Carr Racing	25th
2012	Rotax Max Wintercup — Junior	Paul Carr Racing	4th

== Racing record ==
=== Esports career summary ===
Season	Series	Team	Races	Wins	Poles	F/Laps	Podiums	Points	Position
2017	Formula One eSports Series	None	5	1	N/A	N/A	3	35	5th
2018	Formula One eSports Series	Toro Rosso Esports Team	4	0	0	0	0	32	12th
2019	Formula One eSports Series	Toro Rosso Esports Team	9	0	0	0	0	4	21st

=== Complete Formula One Esports Series results ===
(key) (Races in bold indicate pole position) (Races in italics indicate fastest lap)

Year	Team	1	2	3	4	5	6	7	8	9	10	11	12	Pos	Points
2017	N/A	GBR; 3	BRA; 2	CAN; 19	BEL; 1	ABU; 11								5th	35
2018	Toro Rosso Esports Team	AUS	CHN	AZE	FRA	GBR; 4	BEL; 6	GER; 8	SIN; 6	USA	ABU			12th	32
2019	Toro Rosso Esports Team	BHR; 14	CHN; 13	AZE; 15	CAN; 9	AUT; 18	GBR; 9	GER	BEL	ITA; 20	JPN; 11	USA; 20	BRA	21st	4

=== Racing career summary ===
Season	Series	Team	Races	Wins	Poles	F/Laps	Podiums	Points	Position
2019	GT4 European Series - Pro-Am	Borusan Otomotiv Motorsport	4	0	0	0	1	26	17th
2019	Formula Renault Eurocup	M2 Competition	2	0	0	0	0	0	NC†
2020	GT4 European Series - Pro-Am	Borusan Otomotiv Motorsport	12	2	2	3	7	192	**2nd**
2021	Euroformula Open Championship	Van Amersfoort Racing	15	2	1	1	8	217	5th
2021	F3 Asian Championship	BlackArts Racing	15	0	0	0	0	61	9th
2021	GT4 European Series - Pro-Am	Borusan Otomotiv Motorsport	4	0	0	0	1	44	11th
2021	GT4 European Series - Am	Borusan Otomotiv Motorsport	2	2	1	1	2	51	11th
2021	GT4 European Series - Silver	Borusan Otomotiv Motorsport	4	0	0	0	1	30	15th
2021	European Le Mans Series - LMP3	EuroInternational	1	0	0	0	1	18	18th
2022	Formula Regional Asian Championship	Evans GP	3	0	0	0	0	0	NC
2022	FIA Formula 2 Championship	Charouz Racing System	16	0	0	0	0	0	24th
2023	Super Formula	TGM Grand Prix	9	0	0	0	0	5	18th
2024	European Le Mans Series - LMP2 Pro-Am	DKR Engineering	6	0	0	0	0	38	8th
2025	European Le Mans Series - LMP2	Nielsen Racing	6	0	1	0	1	46	5th
2025–26	Asian Le Mans Series - LMP2	Nielsen Racing	6	0	0	0	0	28	9th
2026	European Le Mans Series - LMP2 Pro-Am	Vector Sport	6	1	0	0	1	65	5th

^{†} As Bölükbaşı was a guest driver, he was ineligible to score points.

=== Complete GT4 European Series results ===
(key) (Races in bold indicate pole position) (Races in italics indicate fastest lap)

Year	Team	Car	Class	1	2	3	4	5	6	7	8	9	10	11	12	Pos	Points
2019	Borusan Otomotiv Motorsport	BMW M4 GT4	Pro-Am	IMO; 1	IMO; 2	BRH; 1	BRH; 2	LEC; 1 Ret	LEC; 2; 24	MIS; 1; 9	MIS; 2; 20	ZAN; 1	ZAN; 2	NÜR; 1	NÜR; 2	17th	26
2020	Borusan Otomotiv Motorsport	BMW M4 GT4	Silver	**IMO**; **1**; 3	IMO; 2; 11	**MIS**; **1**; 4	MIS; 2; 7	NÜR; 1; 12	NÜR; 2; 8	ZAN; 1; 12	ZAN; 2; 14	SPA; 1; 9	SPA; 2; 5	**LEC**; **1**; 8	LEC; 2 Ret	2nd	192

=== Complete Formula Renault Eurocup results ===
(key) (Races in bold indicate pole position; races in italics indicate fastest lap)

Year	Team	1	2	3	4	5	6	7	8	9	10	11	12	13	14	15	16	17	18	19	20	Pos	Points
2019	M2 Competition	MNZ; 1	MNZ; 2	SIL; 1	SIL; 2	MON; 1	MON; 2	LEC; 1	LEC; 2	SPA; 1	SPA; 2	NÜR; 1	NÜR; 2	HUN; 1	HUN; 2	CAT; 1	CAT; 2	HOC; 1; 16	HOC; 2 Ret	YMC; 1	YMC; 2	NC†	0

=== Complete Formula Regional Asian Championship results ===
(key) (Races in bold indicate pole position) (Races in italics indicate fastest lap)

Year	Entrant	1	2	3	4	5	6	7	8	9	10	11	12	13	14	15	DC	Points
2021	BlackArts Racing	DUB; 1; 7	DUB; 2; 9	DUB; 3; 8	ABU; 1; 8	ABU; 2; 7	ABU; 3; 10	ABU; 1; 7	ABU; 2; 5	ABU; 3 Ret	DUB; 1; 7	DUB; 2; 8	DUB; 3; 12	ABU; 1; 9	ABU; 2; 6	ABU; 3; 9	9th	61
2022	Evans GP	ABU; 1 Ret	ABU; 2 Ret	ABU; 3 Ret	DUB; 1	DUB; 2	DUB; 3	DUB; 1	DUB; 2	DUB; 3	DUB; 1	DUB; 2	DUB; 3	ABU; 1	ABU; 2	ABU; 3	-	0

=== Complete Euroformula Open Championship results ===
(key) (Races in bold indicate pole position; races in italics indicate points for the fastest lap of top ten finishers)

Year	Entrant	1	2	3	4	5	6	7	8	9	10	11	12	13	14	15	16	17	18	19	20	21	22	23	24	DC	Points
2021	Van Amersfoort Racing	POR; 1	POR; 2	POR; 3	LEC; 1	LEC; 2	LEC; 3	SPA; 1	SPA; 2	SPA; 3	HUN; 1; 1	HUN; 2; 3	HUN; 3; 7	IMO; 1; 3	IMO; 2; 4	IMO; 3 Ret	RBR; 1; 4	RBR; 2; 2	RBR; 3; 6	MNZ; 1; 3	MNZ; 2; 2	MNZ; 3; 2	**CAT**; **1**; 1	CAT; 2; 4	CAT; 3; 4	5th	217

=== Complete European Le Mans Series results ===
(key) (Races in bold indicate pole position; results in italics indicate fastest lap)

Year	Entrant	Class	Chassis	Engine	1	2	3	4	5	6	Rank	Points
2021	Eurointernational	LMP3	Ligier JS P320	Nissan VK56DE 5.6L V8	CAT	RBR; 2	LEC	MNZ	SPA	ALG	18th	18
2024	DKR Engineering	LMP2 Pro-Am	Oreca 07	Gibson GK428 4.2 L V8	CAT; 6	LEC; 8	IMO; 5	SPA; 5	MUG; Ret	ALG; 7	8th	38
2025	Nielsen Racing	LMP2	Oreca 07	Gibson GK428 4.2 L V8	CAT; 7	LEC; 5	IMO; 7	**SPA**; 3	SIL; 6	ALG; Ret	5th	46
2026	Vector Sport	LMP2 Pro-Am	Oreca 07	Gibson GK428 4.2 L V8	CAT; 6	LEC; 5	IMO; 1	SPA; 7	SIL; 8	ALG; 4	5th	65

=== Complete FIA Formula 2 Championship results ===
(key) (Races in bold indicate pole position) (Races in italics indicate points for the fastest lap of top ten finishers)

Year	Entrant	1	2	3	4	5	6	7	8	9	10	11	12	13	14	15	16	17	18	19	20	21	22	23	24	25	26	27	28	DC	Points
2022	Charouz Racing System	BHR; SPR; 14	BHR; FEA; 14	JED; SPR; WD	JED; FEA; WD	IMO; SPR	IMO; FEA	CAT; SPR; 18	CAT; FEA; 20	MCO; SPR; 12	MCO; FEA; 11	BAK; SPR; 18†	BAK; FEA; Ret	SIL; SPR; 19	SIL; FEA; 18	RBR; SPR; NC	RBR; FEA; Ret	LEC; SPR; 15	LEC; FEA; Ret	HUN; SPR; 16	HUN; FEA; 13	SPA; SPR	SPA; FEA	ZAN; SPR	ZAN; FEA	MNZ; SPR	MNZ; FEA	YMC; SPR	YMC; FEA	24th	0

=== Complete Super Formula results ===
(key) (Races in bold indicate pole position; races in italics indicate fastest lap)

Year	Team	Engine	1	2	3	4	5	6	7	8	9	DC	Points
2023	TGM Grand Prix	Honda	FUJ; 8	FUJ; 17	SUZ; 9	AUT; 15	SUG; 17	FUJ; 18	MOT; 11	SUZ; 20	SUZ; 15	18th	5

=== 24 Hours of Le Mans results ===
Year	Team	Co-Drivers	Car	Class	Laps	Pos.	Class Pos.
2025	(United Kingdom) Nielsen Racing	(United States) Colin Braun (United States) Naveen Rao	Oreca 07-Gibson	LMP2	170	DNF	DNF
2025	(United Kingdom) Nielsen Racing	(United States) Colin Braun (United States) Naveen Rao	Oreca 07-Gibson	LMP2 Pro-Am	170	DNF	DNF

=== Complete Asian Le Mans Series results ===
(key) (Races in bold indicate pole position) (Races in italics indicate fastest lap)

Year	Team	Class	Car	Engine	1	2	3	4	5	6	Pos.	Points
2025–26	Nielsen Racing	LMP2	Oreca 07	Gibson GK428 4.2 L V8	SEP; 1; 4	SEP; 2; 9	DUB; 1; 7	DUB; 2; 14	ABU; 1; 14	ABU; 2; 6	9th	28
