= 2018 Formula One Esports Series =

Racing eSports Series

Tournament information
- Sport: Formula One Esports Series
- Location: Qualification: Worldwide; Pro Draft: Gfinity Arena; Pro Series: Gfinity Arena
- Dates: 10 October–17 November 2018
- Administrator: Codemasters; Formula One Management; FIA
- Tournament format(s): Qualification: Online; Pro Draft: Driver's selection Pro Series: Ten race championship
- Venue: Qualification: Worldwide; Pro Draft: Gfinity Arena; Pro Series: Gfinity Arena

Final positions
- Champions: (United Kingdom) Brendon Leigh (Germany) Mercedes-AMG Petronas Esports Team

The 2018 Formula One Esports Series was the second season of the Formula One Esports Series. It started on October 10, 2018 and ended on November 17, 2018. It was held on Formula One's official 2018 game. The championship was held at Gfinity Arena in London, United Kingdom. Brendon Leigh defended his Drivers' Championship title, while his team Mercedes-AMG Petronas Esports clinched its first championship title.

== Format ==
- Qualification - The season opens with online qualification, a global call for participation. Qualification is open to anyone with a copy of the official Formula 1 video game developed by Codemasters. The fastest gamers get through.
- Pro Draft - Qualifying gamers enter the Pro Draft where the official Formula 1 teams select their drivers to represent them in the F1 Esports Pro Series championships.
- Pro Series - The drivers race in 25-50% races over a series of events that are broadcast live. They earn points for themselves and their F1 teams. These races will determine the F1 New Balance Esports Series Teams’ and Drivers’ World Champions, with a portion of the prize fund distributed to the teams based on their standings.

== Teams and drivers ==
Team	Race drivers		
Team	No.	Driver name	Rounds
(Switzerland) Alfa Romeo Racing Sauber F1 eSports Team	22; 46; 23	(United Kingdom) Salih Saltunç (United Kingdom) Sonuc Saltunç (Netherlands) Allert van der Wal	All; 1, 4–8; 2–3, 9–10
(United States) Haas F1 Esports Team	98; 69; 63	(Czech Republic) Martin Stefanko (Czech Republic) Michal Smidl (United Kingdom) Tom Parker	All; 1–3, 7–10; 4–6
(United Kingdom) Hype Energy eForce India F1 Esports Team	24; 88; 95	(Germany) Marcel Kiefer (Chile) Fabrizio Donoso (Denmark) Mads Sørensen	All; 1–3, 5–7, 9–10; 4, 8
(United Kingdom) McLaren Shadow	20; 12; 32	(Netherlands) Bono Huis (Italy) Enzo Bonito (Finland) Olli Pahkala	1–6, 9–10; 2–10; 1, 7–8
(Germany) Mercedes-AMG Petronas Esports Team	72; 12	(United Kingdom) Brendon Leigh (Hungary) Dániel Bereznay	All; All
(Austria) Red Bull Racing Esports	51; 34	(Finland) Joni Törmälä (United Kingdom) Graham Carroll	All; All
(France) Renault Sport Team Vitality	4; 99; 21	(United Kingdom) James Doherty (Germany) Sven Zürner (Sweden) Kimmy Larsson	1–6; 1–3, 7–10; 4–10
(Italy) Toro Rosso Esports Team	19; 13; 74	(Denmark) Frederik Rasmussen (Germany) Patrick Holzmann (Turkey) Cem Bölükbaşı	1–6, 9–10; 1–4, 7–10; 5–8
(United Kingdom) Williams Esports	93; 42	(Spain) Álvaro Carretón (Finland) Tino Naukkarinen	All; All

== Calendar ==
Round	Event	Circuit	Distance	Date
1	Event One	(Australia) Melbourne Grand Prix Circuit, Melbourne	18 Laps	10 October
2	Event One	(China) Shanghai International Circuit, Shanghai	14 Laps	10 October
3	Event One	(Azerbaijan) Baku City Circuit, Baku	13 Laps	10 October
4	Event Two	(France) Circuit Paul Ricard, Le Castellet	13 Laps	31 October
5	Event Two	(United Kingdom) Silverstone Circuit, Silverstone	13 Laps	31 October
6	Event Two	(Belgium) Circuit de Spa-Francorchamps, Stavelot	11 Laps	31 October
7	Grand Finale	(Germany) Hockenheimring, Hockenheim	17 Laps	17 November
8	Grand Finale	Marina Bay Street Circuit, Singapore	15 Laps	17 November
9	Grand Finale	(United States) Circuit of the Americas, Austin, Texas	14 Laps	17 November
10	Grand Finale	(United Arab Emirates) Yas Marina Circuit, Abu Dhabi	28 Laps	17 November

== Results ==
=== Season summary ===
Round	Circuit	Pole position	Fastest lap	Winning driver	Winning team
1	(Australia) Melbourne Grand Prix Circuit, Melbourne	(United Kingdom) Brendon Leigh	(Germany) Patrick Holzmann	(United Kingdom) Brendon Leigh	(Germany) Mercedes-AMG Petronas Esports Team
2	(China) Shanghai International Circuit, Shanghai	(Hungary) Dániel Bereznay	(United Kingdom) Brendon Leigh	(United Kingdom) Brendon Leigh	(Germany) Mercedes-AMG Petronas Esports Team
3	(Azerbaijan) Baku City Circuit, Baku	(Hungary) Dániel Bereznay	(Denmark) Frederik Rasmussen	(Denmark) Frederik Rasmussen	(Italy) Toro Rosso Esports Team
4	(France) Circuit Paul Ricard, Le Castellet	(United Kingdom) Brendon Leigh	(Italy) Enzo Bonito	(United Kingdom) Brendon Leigh	(Germany) Mercedes-AMG Petronas Esports Team
5	(United Kingdom) Silverstone Circuit, Silverstone	(United Kingdom) Brendon Leigh	(United Kingdom) Brendon Leigh	(United Kingdom) Brendon Leigh	(Germany) Mercedes-AMG Petronas Esports Team
6	(Belgium) Circuit de Spa-Francorchamps, Stavelot	(Hungary) Dániel Bereznay	(Czech Republic) Martin Stefanko	(Hungary) Dániel Bereznay	(Germany) Mercedes-AMG Petronas Esports Team
7	(Germany) Hockenheimring, Hockenheim	(United Kingdom) Salih Saltunç	N.A.	(United Kingdom) Salih Saltunç	(Switzerland) Alfa Romeo Racing Sauber F1 eSports Team
8	Marina Bay Street Circuit, Singapore	(Italy) Enzo Bonito	N.A.	(United Kingdom) Brendon Leigh	(Germany) Mercedes-AMG Petronas Esports Team
9	(United States) Circuit of the Americas, Austin, Texas	(United Kingdom) Brendon Leigh	N.A.	(United Kingdom) Brendon Leigh	(Germany) Mercedes-AMG Petronas Esports Team
10	(United Arab Emirates) Yas Marina Circuit, Abu Dhabi	(Denmark) Frederik Rasmussen	N.A.	(Hungary) Daniel Bereznay	(Germany) Mercedes-AMG Petronas Esports Team

== Championship standings ==
=== Scoring system ===
Same as 2018 Formula One World Championship, points are awarded to the top ten classified drivers in every race, using the following system:

Position	1st	2nd	3rd	4th	5th	6th	7th	8th	9th	10th
Points	25	18	15	12	10	8	6	4	2	1

In the event of a tie at the conclusion of the championship, a count-back system is used as a tie-breaker, with a driver's/constructor's best result used to decide the standings.

=== Drivers' Championship standings ===
Pos.	Driver	AUS (Australia)	CHN (China)	AZE (Azerbaijan)	FRA (France)	GBR (United Kingdom)	BEL (Belgium)	GER (Germany)	SIN (Singapore)	USA (United States)	ABU‡ (United Arab Emirates)	Points
1	(United Kingdom) Brendon Leigh	1^{P}	1^{F}	2	1^{P}	1^{P}^{F}	5	2	1	1^{P}	5	216
2	(Hungary) Dániel Bereznay	6	2^{P}	3^{P}	4	12	1^{P}	6	4	2	1	166
3	(Denmark) Frederik Rasmussen	9	4	1^{F}	3	2	3			5	3^{P}	127
4	(United Kingdom) Salih Saltunç	8	6	13	6	7	4	1^{P}	13	4	8	83
5	(Germany) Marcel Kiefer	13	3	14	5	3	15	9	3	7	10	65
6	(Netherlands) Bono Huis	10	7	4	8	10	14			9	2	62
7	(Finland) Joni Törmälä	3	12	10	9	9	2	3	14	10	14	54
8	(Germany) Patrick Holzmann	17^{F}	9	5	2			7	12	3	18	51
9	(Spain) Álvaro Carretón	7	13	16	7	13	12	5	2	18	17	40
10	(Italy) Enzo Bonito		16	6	10^{F}	18	18	12	18^{P}	8	4	37
11	(Chile) Fabrizio Donoso	11	5	9		14	7	4		14	9	34
12	(Turkey) Cem Bölükbaşı					4	6	8	6			32
13	(Finland) Tino Naukkarinen	2	15	11	13	6	9	10	15	11	16	29
14	(United Kingdom) Graham Carroll	4	8	12	11	8	10	17	7	13	11	27
15	(Czech Republic) Martin Stefanko	12	10	18	16	11	11^{F}	15	5	16	7	23
16	(Netherlands) Allert van der Wal		18	7						15	6	22
17	(United Kingdom) James Doherty	5	14	8	15	17	13					14
18	(United Kingdom) Sonuc Saltunç	15			17	5	8	18	17			14
19	(Germany) Sven Zürner	18	11	15				16	11	6	15	8
20	(Czech Republic) Michal Smidl	14	17	17				13	8	17	12	4
21	(Finland) Olli Pahkala	16						11	9			2
22	(Sweden) Kimmy Larsson				14	15	16	14	10	12	13	1
23	(Denmark) Mads Sørensen				12				16			0
24	(United Kingdom) Tom Parker				18	16	17					0
Pos.	Driver	AUS (Australia)	CHN (China)	AZE (Azerbaijan)	FRA (France)	GBR (United Kingdom)	BEL (Belgium)	GER (Germany)	SIN (Singapore)	USA (United States)	ABU‡ (United Arab Emirates)	Points

Key
Colour	Result
Gold	Winner
Silver	Second place
Bronze	Third place
Green	Other points position
Blue	Other classified position
Blue	Not classified, finished (NC)
Purple	Not classified, retired (Ret)
Red	Did not qualify (DNQ)
Red	Did not pre-qualify (DNPQ)
Black	Disqualified (DSQ)
White	Did not start (DNS)
White	Race cancelled (C)
Blank	Did not enter
Annotation	Meaning
P	Pole position
F	Fastest lap

Note:

- ‡ – Double points were awarded in the last race at the Yas Marina Circuit, Abu Dhabi.

=== Teams' Championship standings ===
Pos.	Team	AUS (Australia)	CHN (China)	AZE (Azerbaijan)	FRA (France)	GBR (United Kingdom)	BEL (Belgium)	GER (Germany)	SIN (Singapore)	USA (United States)	ABU‡ (United Arab Emirates)	Points
1	(Germany) Mercedes-AMG Petronas Esports Team	1^{P}	1^{F}	2	1^{P}	1^{P}^{F}	1^{P}	2	1	1^{P}	1	382
1	(Germany) Mercedes-AMG Petronas Esports Team	6	2^{P}	3^{P}	4	12	5	6	4	2	5	382
2	(Italy) Toro Rosso Esports Team	9	4	1^{F}	2	2	3	7	6	3	3^{P}	210
2	(Italy) Toro Rosso Esports Team	17^{F}	9	5	3	4	6	8	12	5	18	210
3	(Switzerland) Alfa Romeo Racing Sauber F1 eSports Team	8	6	7	6	5	4	1^{P}	13	4	6	119
3	(Switzerland) Alfa Romeo Racing Sauber F1 eSports Team	15	18	13	17	7	8	18	17	15	8	119
4	(United Kingdom) McLaren Shadow	10	7	4	8	10	14	11	9	8	2	101
4	(United Kingdom) McLaren Shadow	13	13	6	10^{F}	18	18	12	18^{P}	9	4	101
5	(United Kingdom) Hype Energy eForce India F1 Esports Team	11	3	9	5	3	7	4	3	7	9	99
5	(United Kingdom) Hype Energy eForce India F1 Esports Team	13	5	14	12	14	15	9	16	14	10	99
6	(Austria) Red Bull Racing Esports	3	8	10	9	8	2	3	7	10	11	81
6	(Austria) Red Bull Racing Esports	4	12	11	11	9	10	17	14	13	14	81
7	(United Kingdom) Williams Esports	2	13	11	7	6	9	5	2	11	16	69
7	(United Kingdom) Williams Esports	7	15	16	13	13	12	10	15	18	17	69
8	(United States) Haas F1 Esports Team	12	10	17	16	11	11^{F}	13	5	16	7	27
8	(United States) Haas F1 Esports Team	14	17	18	18	16	17	15	8	17	12	27
9	(France) Renault Sport Team Vitality	5	11	8	14	15	13	14	10	6	13	23
9	(France) Renault Sport Team Vitality	18	14	15	15	17	16	16	11	12	15	23
Pos.	Team	AUS (Australia)	CHN (China)	AZE (Azerbaijan)	FRA (France)	GBR (United Kingdom)	BEL (Belgium)	GER (Germany)	SIN (Singapore)	USA (United States)	ABU‡ (United Arab Emirates)	Points

Key
Colour	Result
Gold	Winner
Silver	Second place
Bronze	Third place
Green	Other points position
Blue	Other classified position
Blue	Not classified, finished (NC)
Purple	Not classified, retired (Ret)
Red	Did not qualify (DNQ)
Red	Did not pre-qualify (DNPQ)
Black	Disqualified (DSQ)
White	Did not start (DNS)
White	Race cancelled (C)
Blank	Did not enter
Annotation	Meaning
P	Pole position
F	Fastest lap

Notes:

- ‡ – Double points were awarded in the last race at the Yas Marina Circuit, Abu Dhabi.
- The standings are sorted by best result, rows are not related to the drivers. In case of tie on points, the best positions achieved determined the outcome.
