= Mercedes-Benz in Formula One =

Formula One activities of Mercedes-Benz

(Germany) Mercedes
- Full name: Mercedes-AMG Petronas Formula One Team
- Base: Stuttgart, Baden-Württemberg, Germany (1954–1955); Brackley, England (2010–present)
- Team principal(s): Toto Wolff (Team Principal & CEO); Bradley Lord (Deputy Team Principal)
- Technical Director: James Allison
- Website: mercedesamgf1.com
- Previous name: Brawn GP

2026 Formula One World Championship
- Race drivers: 12. (Italy) Kimi Antonelli; 63. (United Kingdom) George Russell
- Test driver(s): (Denmark) Frederik Vesti (France) Théo Pourchaire
- Chassis: W17
- Engine: Mercedes
- Tyres: Pirelli

Formula One World Championship career
- First entry: 1954 French Grand Prix
- Last entry: 2026 São Paulo Grand Prix
- Races entered: 361
- Engines: Mercedes
- Constructors' Championships: 9 (2014, 2015, 2016, 2017, 2018, 2019, 2020, 2021, 2026)
- Drivers' Championships: 10 (1954, 1955, 2014, 2015, 2016, 2017, 2018, 2019, 2020, 2026)
- Race victories: 143
- Podiums: 334
- Points: 8801.5 (8940.64) (Note: The extra 139.14 points are Mercedes drivers' points from 1954 to 1955, before the World Constructors' Championship was established in 1958.)
- Pole positions: 155
- Fastest laps: 125
- 2025 position: 2nd (469 pts)

Mercedes as a Formula One engine manufacturer
Formula One World Championship career
- First entry: 1954 French Grand Prix
- Last entry: 2026 São Paulo Grand Prix
- Races entered: 633 (631 starts)
- Chassis: Mercedes, Sauber, McLaren, Brawn, Force India, Williams, Lotus, Manor, Aston Martin
- Constructors' Championships: 13 (1998, 2009, 2014, 2015, 2016, 2017, 2018, 2019, 2020, 2021, 2024, 2025 2026) (Note: The 1998 Constructors' Championship was won with engines built by Ilmor.)
- Drivers' Championships: 15 (1954, 1955, 1998, 1999, 2008, 2009, 2014, 2015, 2016, 2017, 2018, 2019, 2020, 2025, 2026) (Note: The 1998 and 1999 Drivers' Championships were won with engines built by Ilmor.)
- Race victories: 253 (Note: 44 of these wins were achieved by engines built by Ilmor.)
- Podiums: 692
- Points: 17530.5 (17669.64) (Note: The extra 139.14 points are Mercedes-powered drivers' points from 1954 to 1955, before the World Constructors' Championship was established in 1958.)
- Pole positions: 265
- Fastest laps: 251

Mercedes-Benz, a German automotive brand of the Mercedes-Benz Group, has been involved in Formula One as both team owner and engine manufacturer for various periods since 1954. The current Mercedes-Benz Grand Prix Limited, competing as Mercedes-AMG Petronas Formula One Team, is based in Brackley, England, and holds a German racing licence. An announcement was made in December 2020 that Ineos planned to take a one third equal ownership stake alongside the Mercedes-Benz Group and Toto Wolff; this came into effect on 25 January 2022. Mercedes-branded teams are often referred to by the nickname, the "Silver Arrows" (German: Silberpfeile).

Before the Second World War, Mercedes-Benz competed in the European Championship, winning three titles. The marque debuted in Formula One in 1954. After winning their first race at the 1954 French Grand Prix, driver Juan Manuel Fangio won another three Grands Prix to win the 1954 Drivers' Championship and repeated this success in 1955. Despite winning two Drivers' Championships, Mercedes-Benz withdrew from motor racing after 1955 in response to the 1955 Le Mans disaster.

Mercedes returned to Formula One in 1994 as an engine manufacturer in association with Ilmor, a British independent high-performance autosport engineering company, which developed their engines. The company won one constructors' title and three drivers' titles in a works partnership with McLaren which lasted until 2009. In 2005, Ilmor was rebranded as Mercedes AMG High Performance Powertrains. In 2010, the company bought the Brawn GP team, rebranding it as Mercedes. Since a major rule shake-up in 2014, which required the use of turbochargers and hybrid electric engines, Mercedes has become one of the most successful teams in Formula One history, winning seven consecutive Drivers' titles from 2014 to 2020 and eight consecutive Constructors' titles from 2014 to 2021, both records. The manufacturer has also collected more than 200 wins as an engine supplier and is ranked second in Formula One history. Twelve Constructors' and fourteen Drivers' Championships have been won with Mercedes-Benz engines.

== Constructor ==
=== Grand Prix racing before Formula One (1930s) ===
Mercedes-Benz formerly competed in Grand Prix motor racing in the 1930s, when the Silver Arrows dominated the races alongside rivals Auto Union. Both teams were heavily funded by the Nazi regime, winning all European Grand Prix Championships after 1934, of which Rudolf Caracciola won three for Mercedes-Benz.

=== Daimler-Benz AG (1954–1955) ===
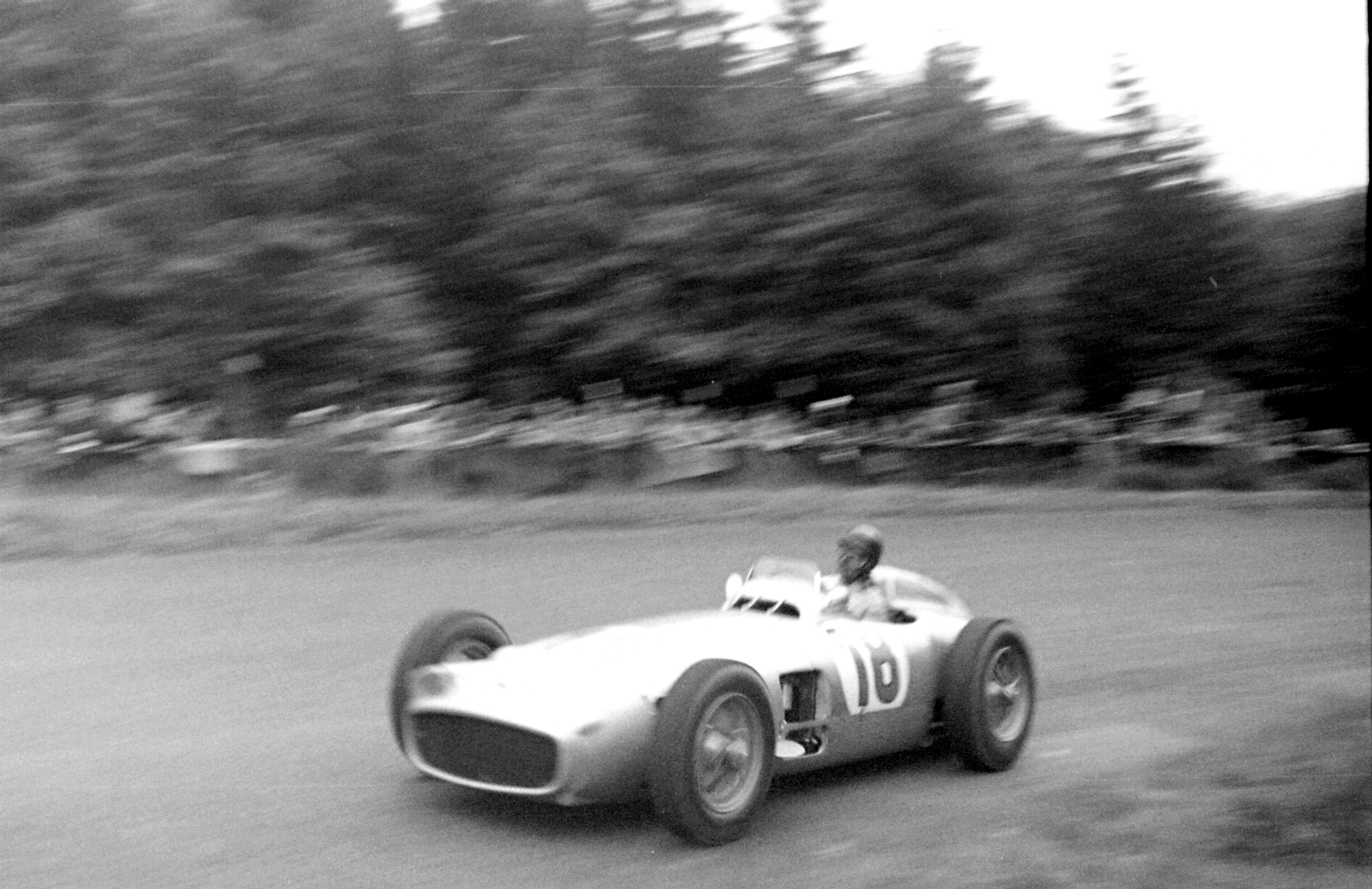
Juan Manuel Fangio at the wheel of the W196 at the Nürburgring during the 1954 German Grand Prix

In 1954, Mercedes-Benz returned to what was now known as Formula One (a World Championship having been established in 1950) under the leadership of Alfred Neubauer, using the technologically advanced Mercedes-Benz W196. The car was run in both the conventional open-wheeled configuration and a streamlined form, which featured covered wheels and wider bodywork. Juan Manuel Fangio, the 1951 champion, transferred mid-season from Maserati to Mercedes-Benz for their debut at the French Grand Prix on 4 July 1954. The team had immediate success and recorded a 1–2 victory with Fangio and Karl Kling, as well as the fastest lap (Hans Herrmann). Fangio went on to win three more races in 1954, winning the championship.

The success continued into the 1955 season, with Mercedes-Benz developing the W196 throughout the year. Mercedes-Benz again dominated the season, with Fangio taking four races, and his new teammate Stirling Moss winning the British Grand Prix. Fangio and Moss finished first and second in that year's championship. The 1955 disaster at the 24 Hours of Le Mans on 11 June, which killed Mercedes-Benz sportscar driver Pierre Levegh and more than 80 spectators led to the cancellations of the French, German, Spanish, and Swiss Grands Prix. At the end of the season, the team withdrew from motor sport, including Formula One. During this first period of the team's participation in Formula One, Mercedes won 9 races in total, including three Grands Prix (the 1954 French Grand Prix, the 1954 Italian Grand Prix and the 1955 Italian Grand Prix) won by the streamlined "Type Monza", making them the only three races won by a closed-wheel car in Formula One history.

=== Mercedes-AMG Petronas Formula One Team (2010–present) ===
Before the start of the 2010 season Mercedes-Benz's parent company Daimler AG bought a minority stake (45.1%) in the Brawn GP team with Aabar Investments purchasing 30% on 16 November 2009. Following the purchase of the team, as well as a sponsorship deal with Petronas, the team was rebranded as Mercedes GP Petronas Formula One Team, and Mercedes would now compete in the constructors' championship for the first time. Ross Brawn continued his duties as team principal and the team retained its base and workforce in the 60,000 m^{2} (650,000 sq ft) Brackley facility, close to the Mercedes-Benz Formula One engine plant (formerly Ilmor Engineering) in Brixworth.

The team has a complex history and its entry can be traced back to Tyrrell Racing, who competed as a constructor from 1970 until 1998, until being bought by British American Tobacco at the end of 1997 so its entry could be transferred to the then new constructor British American Racing (BAR) in 1999. BAR, who had formed a partnership with Honda, eventually became Honda Racing F1 Team in 2006 when British American Tobacco withdrew from the sport. It again changed hands in 2008, when Honda withdrew, and was purchased by the team's management, naming it Brawn GP after team principal Ross Brawn. Brawn used engines from Mercedes-Benz High Performance Engines, and despite running on a low budget, Jenson Button won six of the first seven races and ultimately the 2009 Drivers' Championship, while Brawn won the Constructors' Championship. It was the first time in the sport's sixty-year history that a team won both titles in its maiden season.

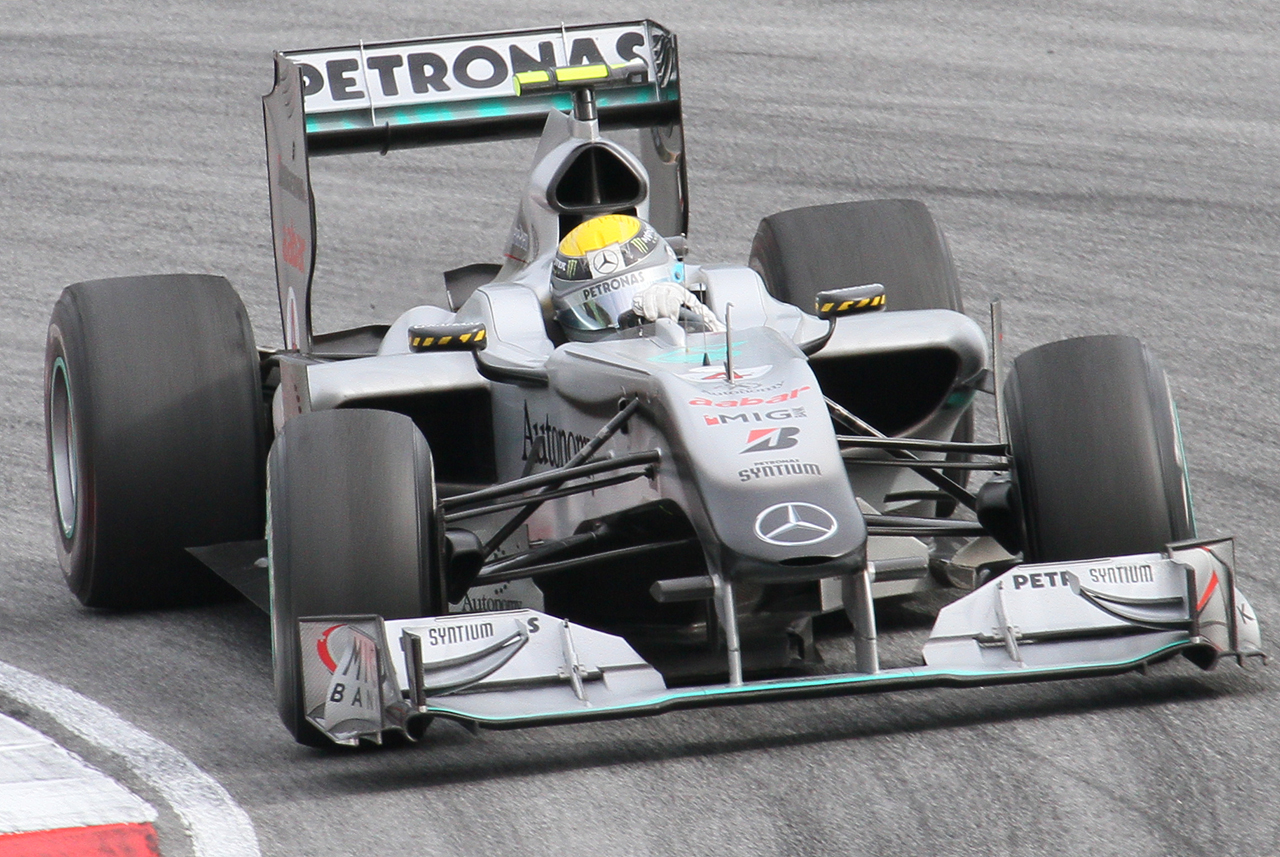
Nico Rosberg scored Mercedes's first podium finish as a works team since 1955 at the 2010 Malaysian Grand Prix

Team Mercedes GP hired German drivers Nico Rosberg, and seven-time world champion Michael Schumacher, who returned to Formula One after a three-year absence, and Nick Heidfeld as the test and reserve driver. Of Brawn's 2009 drivers, Jenson Button signed for McLaren, whilst Rubens Barrichello moved to Rosberg's former seat with Williams team for 2010. With the acquisition of Brawn, the team ended its involvement with McLaren, parent company Daimler AG sold back the 40% shareholding in the McLaren Group, while continuing to supply engines to the team. The team's performance during 2010 was not so competitive as under Brawn, with the team behind the leading three teams of Ferrari, McLaren, and Red Bull. Their best results came from Rosberg finishing on the podium three times, scoring third places at Sepang, Shanghai, and Silverstone. Rosberg eventually finished in seventh place, but Schumacher had a disappointing return, being beaten by his teammate and finishing the season without a single race win, podium, pole position, or fastest lap for the first time since his début season in 1991. He also was involved in a controversy in Hungary after nearly squeezing former Ferrari teammate Rubens Barrichello into the wall at 180 mph (290 km/h). Ultimately, the team finished fourth in the Constructors' Championship, with 214 points.

Prior to the start of the 2011 season, Daimler and Aabar purchased the remaining 24.9% stake owned by the team management in February 2011. Using the new MGP W02, the Australian Grand Prix ended when Schumacher and Rosberg both retired due to crash damage on laps 19 and 22 respectively. In Malaysia, Rosberg qualified ninth and Schumacher again failed to make Q3, qualifying eleventh. Schumacher scored the team's first points of the season with a ninth-place finish, whereas Rosberg had a quiet race and finished twelfth. In China, Rosberg and Schumacher showed strong form, with Rosberg finishing fifth as well as leading fourteen laps during the race, while Schumacher ended the race in eighth place. Rosberg added another fifth place in Turkey, while in Spain, Schumacher finished in sixth place, ahead of Rosberg. After scoring no points at the Monaco Grand Prix, Schumacher equalled his best finish for the team in Canada, finishing fourth after running as high as second. In Valencia, Rosberg finished seventh, and Schumacher seventeenth, after contact with Vitaly Petrov. Rosberg and Schumacher both finished in the points at the following two races in Great Britain and Germany. Gearbox issues stopped Schumacher from scoring at the Hungarian Grand Prix, but Rosberg managed to finish in ninth place. At the Belgian Grand Prix, Schumacher moved from the back of the grid – after losing a wheel in qualifying – to finish fifth, while Rosberg finished sixth, having led the race in its early stages. Again, the team finished fourth in the Constructors' Championship just as in 2010, with 165 points with no wins, podiums, or poles.

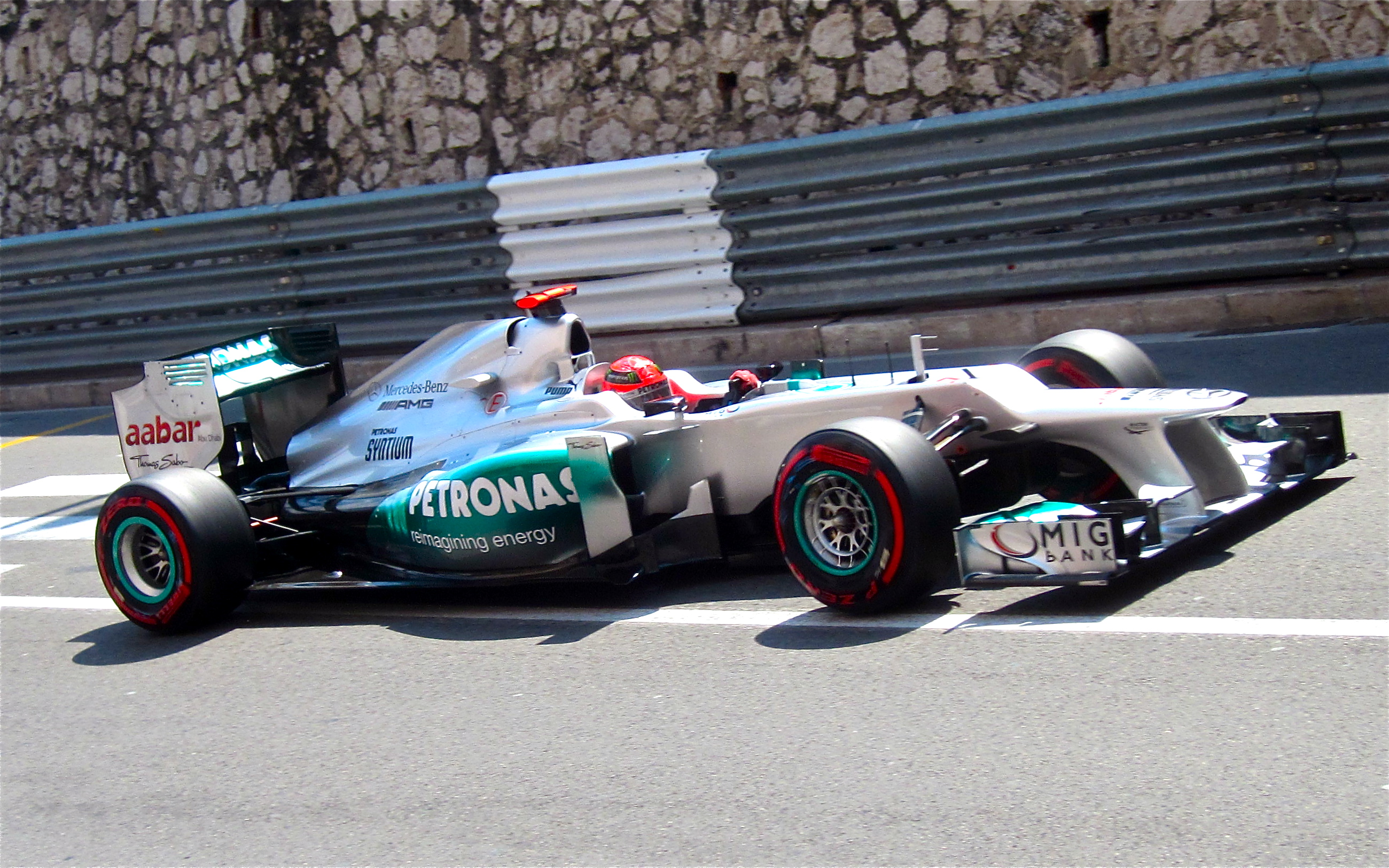
Michael Schumacher at the 2012 Monaco Grand Prix

For 2012, the team removed the GP from their name and added the name of AMG, the high performance brand of Daimler AG, to their title. The team would officially get the designation Mercedes AMG Petronas F1 Team. At the start of the season Mercedes was the subject of protest over the use of a "radical" rear wing concept on the Mercedes F1 W03 racing car, which was not settled until the third race in China when the stewards unanimously rejected the protest. At the third race of the season in China, Rosberg took the team's first pole position as a works team since Fangio in 1955; Schumacher finished the session third, but moved up to second after a grid penalty for McLaren team's Lewis Hamilton. The team secured its first win in 57 years when Nico Rosberg finished first in the 2012 Chinese Grand Prix. This marked also the first win for a German driver driving a German car in Formula 1 history. At the 2012 Monaco Grand Prix, Michael Schumacher set the fastest time in qualifying, but started sixth after a five-place grid penalty was imposed for having caused an avoidable collision with Bruno Senna during the Spanish Grand Prix, the previous round. In addition to that, Rosberg became the first German driver to win a Grand Prix driving a German vehicle since Hermann Lang's victory at the 1939 Swiss Grand Prix. On 28 September 2012, it was announced that McLaren driver Lewis Hamilton would join the Mercedes team from the 2013 season onwards, having signed a three-year deal to partner Nico Rosberg in the team. In January 2013, Toto Wolff became an executive director of the Mercedes AMG Petronas Formula One Team, with his business partner Rene Berger becoming non-executive director. In addition to joining the team as managing partner, he also acquired 30% of Mercedes-Benz Grand Prix Ltd, with a further 10% held by Niki Lauda, chairman of the board, and 60% by the parent company. Wolff took over the co-ordination of all Mercedes-Benz motorsport activities, a responsibility previously held by Norbert Haug.

The following season on 26 May 2013, Nico Rosberg capitalised on a pole position to award the team its first win of 2013 at the Monaco Grand Prix. Paddy Lowe moved to the team as executive director on 3 June 2013. Mercedes then went on to take third place in the Canadian Grand Prix courtesy of Hamilton, followed by another win for Rosberg at the British Grand Prix after the team took 1–2 in qualifying. The team then celebrated their third win of the season after Hamilton took his first victory for the team at the Hungarian Grand Prix, resulting in second place behind Red Bull Racing in the Constructors' Championship.

==== Eight consecutive Constructors' titles (2014–2021) ====
Both drivers were retained for 2014. Rosberg won the first race of the season in Australia, then in Malaysia, Hamilton completed a grand slam – leading every lap from pole position, with the fastest race lap – while Rosberg completed a 1–2 finish for the team; it ended Hamilton's nine race streak without a podium finish, and was the first 1–2 finish by Mercedes as a works team since the 1955 Italian Grand Prix. The team repeated the result at the Bahrain, the Chinese, and the Spanish Grands Prix, while Rosberg and Hamilton finished 1–2 respectively at the Monaco and Austrian Grands Prix. At the German Grand Prix, Rosberg became the first German driver driving a German vehicle to win the German Grand Prix since it was achieved by Rudolf Caracciola and Mercedes-Benz at the 1939 German Grand Prix. At the Russian Grand Prix the team won their first Constructors' Championship as a works team. Hamilton won the last race of the season, held in Abu Dhabi. He finished the season 67 points ahead of Rosberg, clinching the World Drivers' Championship. The team finished the 2014 season 296 points ahead of their closest rival Red Bull Racing in the World Constructors' Championship standings. With 18 pole positions, 16 wins and 11 1–2s out of 19 races, Mercedes dominated this first year of the V6 turbo era. For their 16 race victories, the average winning margin to the nearest non-Mercedes competitor was 23.2 seconds.

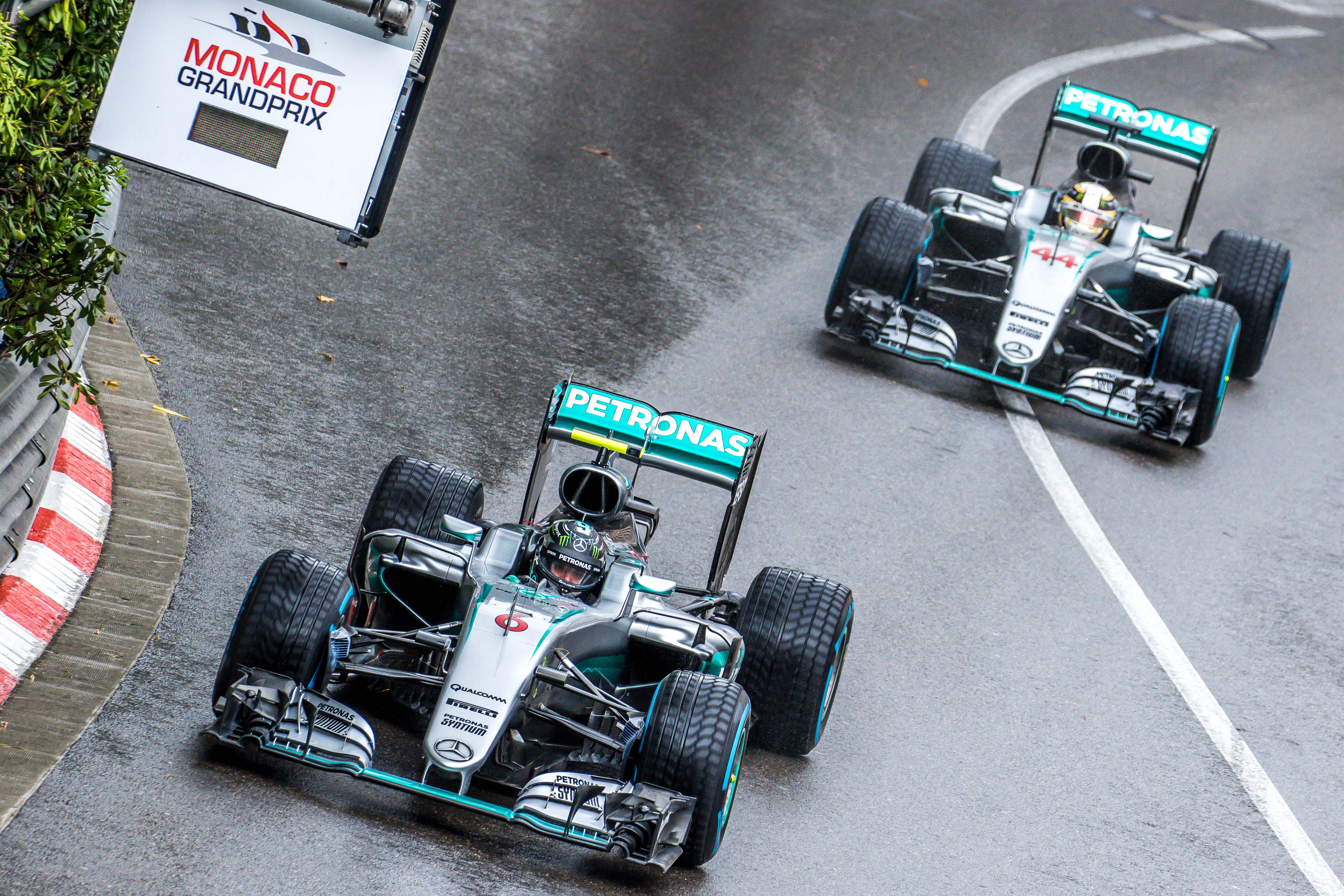
Rosberg (left) and Hamilton (right) at the 2016 Monaco Grand Prix

For the 2015 season, the team retained both Hamilton and Rosberg. At the 2015 Russian Grand Prix the team won their second Constructors' Championship as a works team and Hamilton won his second consecutive Drivers' Championship at the 2015 United States Grand Prix, finishing 59 points ahead of Rosberg. Mercedes continued their domination in this second year of the V6 turbo era, improving on their impressive numbers from 2014 with 18 pole positions, 16 wins and 12 1–2s in 19 races. Of their 16 race victories, the average winning margin to the nearest non-Mercedes competitor was 19.7 seconds, down from 23.2 seconds in 2014.

In the 2016 season, Mercedes won the Constructors' Championship for the third consecutive season, winning 19 of the 21 races held, while securing 20 poles (the highest percentage ever in a single season of F1 at 95.2%) and 8 1–2s. The average winning gap to the nearest non-Mercedes driver dropped to 14.6 seconds. Rosberg won his only Drivers' Championship, finishing 5 points ahead of Hamilton, before announcing his retirement shortly after winning the title.

On 10 January 2017, Mercedes announced that Executive Director Paddy Lowe had left the team, and entered a period of garden leave. On 16 January 2017, Valtteri Bottas was announced as Rosberg's replacement for the 2017 season and British GP3 driver George Russell was incorporated into the junior team. On 22 October 2017, Mercedes won the Constructors' Championship for the fourth consecutive time. One week later, Lewis Hamilton became the first British driver to win four world championships. Mercedes finished the 2017 season with 12 wins out of 20 races, 15 poles, 4 1–2s and an average winning margin to the nearest non-Mercedes driver of 13.1 seconds.

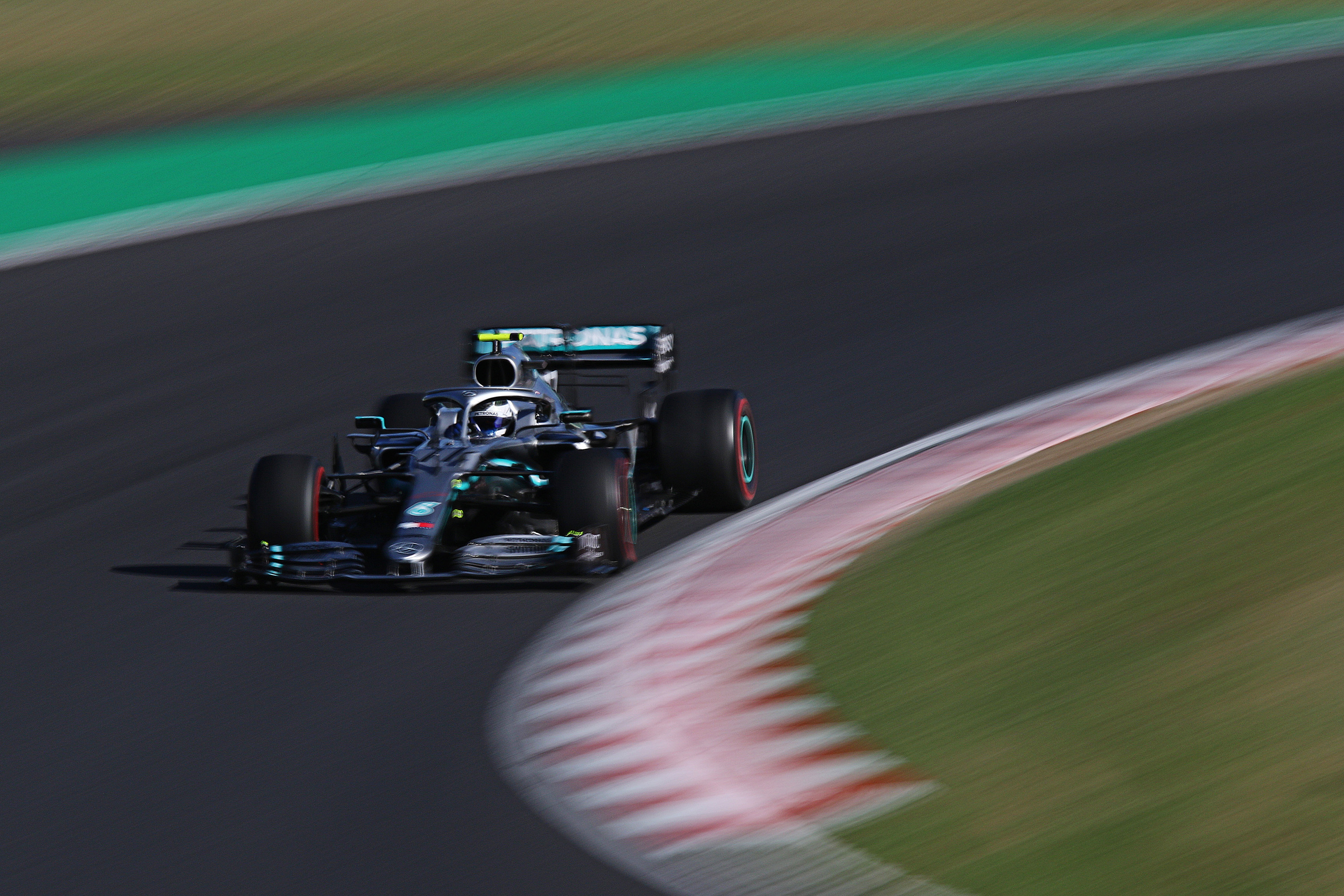
Bottas at the 2019 Japanese Grand Prix

For the 2018 season the team retained both Hamilton and Bottas. The team clinched their fifth straight constructors' title at the penultimate race of the season in Brazil after a win for Hamilton. In the 2018 season, Mercedes won 11 races (all for Hamilton) out of 21 races, took 10 fastest laps (three for Hamilton and seven for Bottas), 13 pole positions (eleven for Hamilton and two for Bottas), and four 1–2 finishes. This made Mercedes only the second team in the history in F1 to achieve the feat of winning 5 drivers' and constructors' titles in a row, after Ferrari did so between 2000 and 2004.

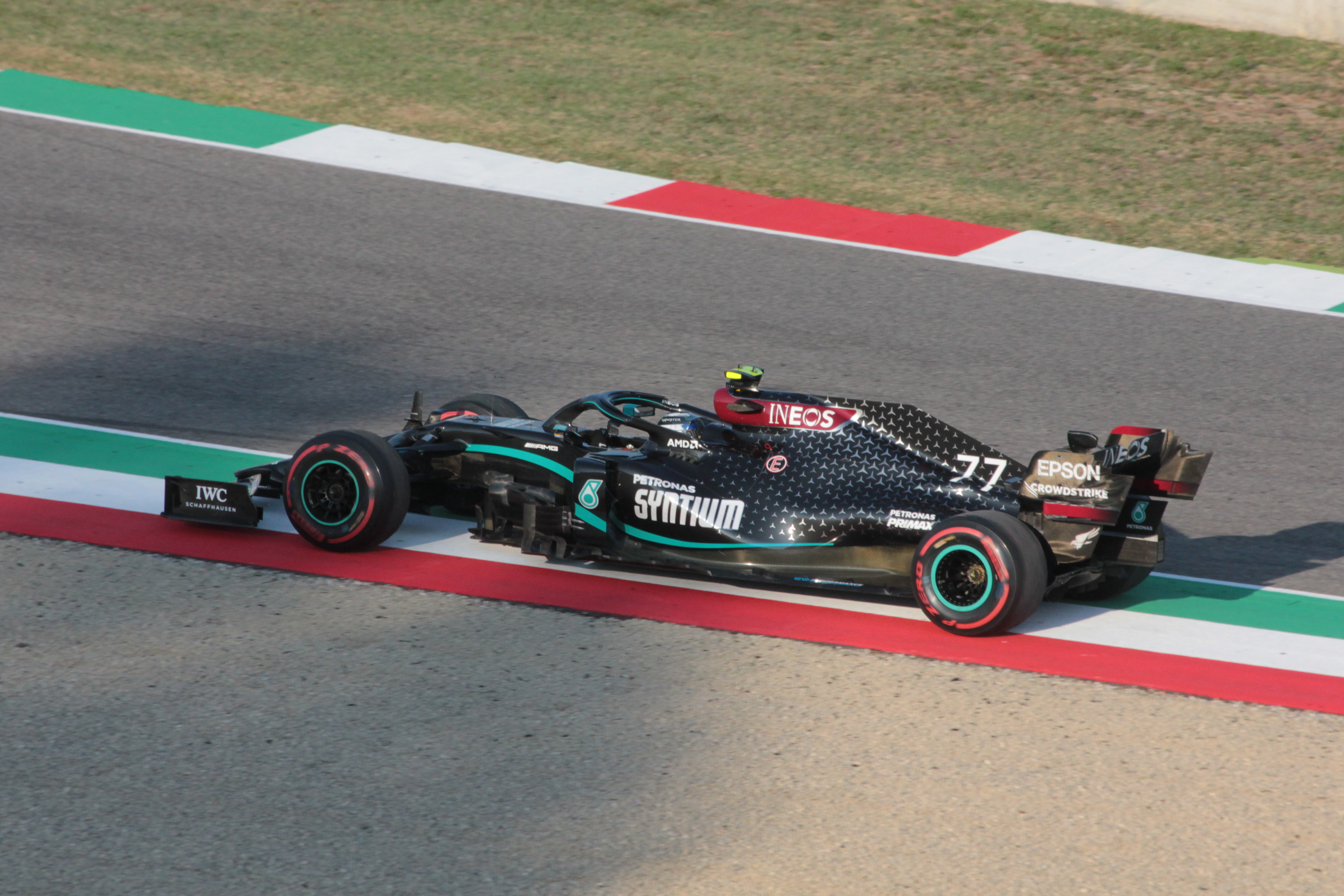
Bottas at the 2020 Tuscan Grand Prix

For the 2019 season, the team again retained both Hamilton and Bottas. In the opening race, both drivers locked out the front row with Hamilton taking pole position. Bottas overtook Hamilton at the start and took his first victory since the 2017 Abu Dhabi Grand Prix, with Hamilton managing to give the team a 1–2 finish after fending off Red Bull's Max Verstappen. The team continued the strong performance through the first half of the season. By the summer break, Mercedes had won 10 out of 12 races with Hamilton taking 8 victories to Bottas' 2, securing 1–2 finishes at the first 5 races of the season. The team would go on to take both the drivers and constructors titles for the sixth consecutive year.

The team debuted their "Dual-Axis-Steering" system during pre-season testing for the 2020 season. This allows the driver to change the toe of the front wheels by pushing or pulling on the steering wheel. This allows the driver to optimise the car for better tyre warming on the straights with zero toe, or better mechanical grip in the corners with positive toe. The system was allowed for the 2020 season, but has been made illegal for 2021. The team would go on to win both the drivers and constructors championships. Before the penultimate round of the season, the 2020 Sakhir Grand Prix, Hamilton was forced to sit the race out following a positive coronavirus test, with Williams driver and Mercedes junior George Russell replacing him.

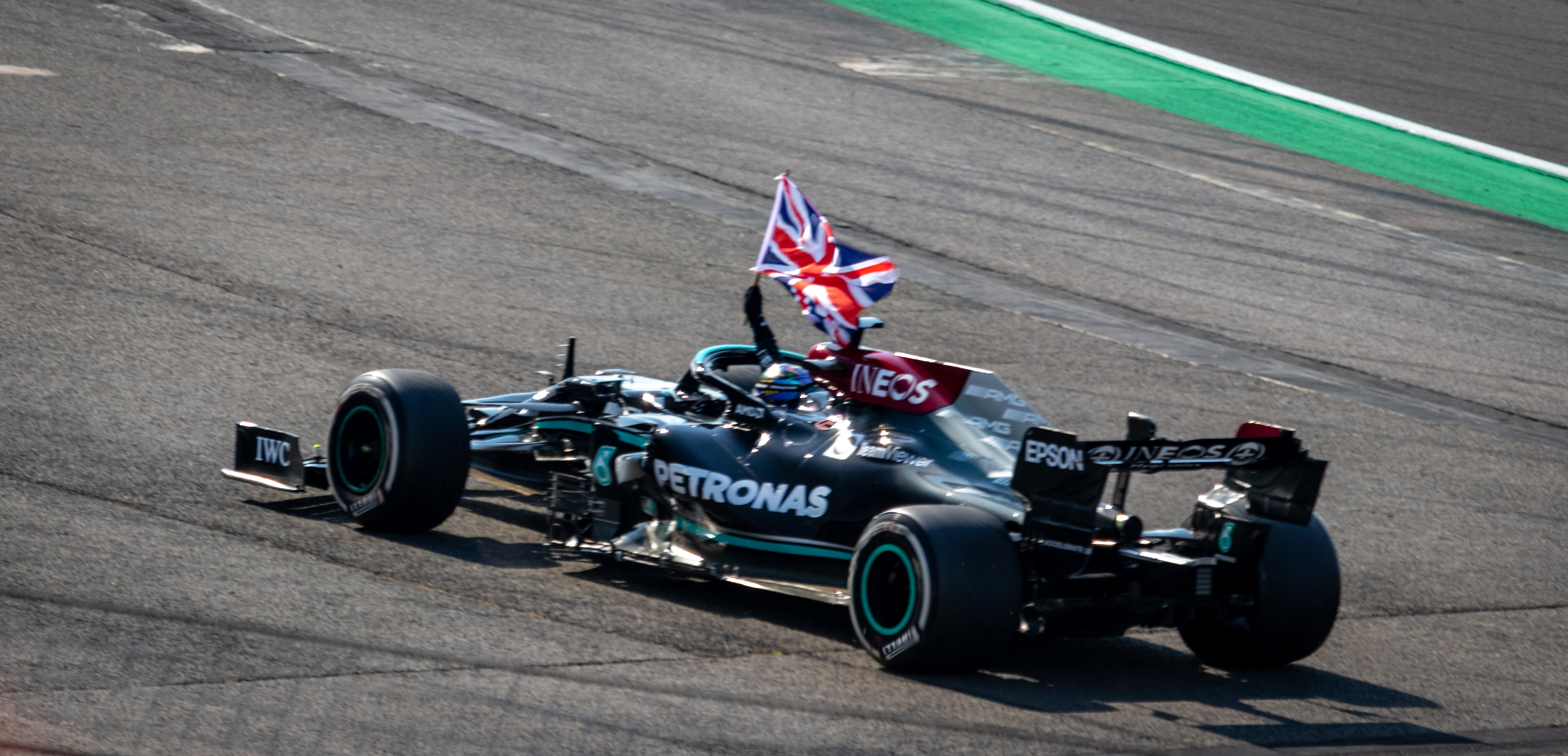
Lewis Hamilton after a victory at the 2021 British Grand Prix

For 2021, the team retained the same driver line-up for a fifth straight season. The team failed to win the drivers' championship for the first time in the V6 turbo-hybrid era, with Hamilton being overtaken by title rival Max Verstappen on the last lap of the season-ending Abu Dhabi Grand Prix after a controversial safety car restart. Hamilton had comfortably led the race and been on course for his eighth title before a late safety car caused by Nicholas Latifi's crash on Turn 14. The actions of FIA race director Michael Masi surrounding the controversial procedures used during the late safety car caused Mercedes to file an intention to appeal the results of that race, though this was later withdrawn. Hamilton finished second in the championship, eight points behind champion Verstappen, with Bottas third in the standings in his final season with the team. The team took the constructors' title for a record-extending eighth consecutive season.

==== Struggling with ground effect (2022–2025) ====
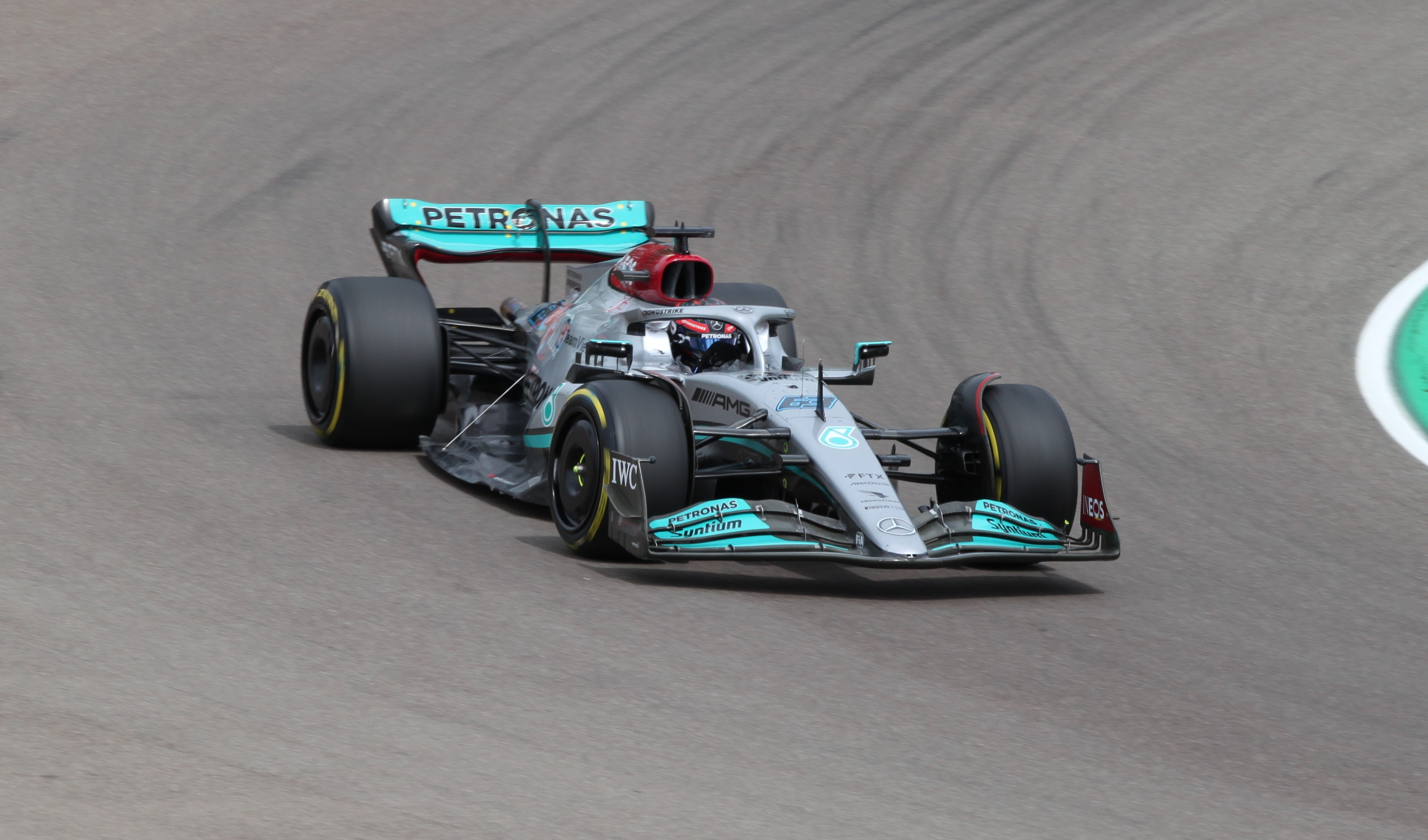
George Russell driving the Mercedes W13 at the 2022 Emilia Romagna Grand Prix

Mercedes junior driver, George Russell replaced Bottas to partner Hamilton for 2022. 2022 saw major rule changes, which reintroduced ground effect. Mercedes revealed a radical design with what was dubbed 'zero-pods'. The radical design did not pay dividends, as the team struggled to understand and unlock its full potential. Additionally, the car suffered from aggressive porpoising, the porpoising was significantly reduced and "solved" ahead of the Canadian Grand Prix. Despite their performance struggles, Mercedes's reliability was "amazing", meaning their only three retirements of the season came at the British Grand Prix, where Russell was involved in a crash with Zhou Guanyu and Pierre Gasly, the Belgian Grand Prix, where Hamilton was involved in a crash with Fernando Alonso, and the Abu Dhabi Grand Prix, where Hamilton suffered a mechanical failure, but was still classified 18th. The team regularly appeared on the podium. At the French Grand Prix, Hamilton finished second while Russell finished third, marking the team's first double podium of the season. Russell achieved his first ever pole position, and Mercedes's first of the season, at the Hungarian Grand Prix. Russell achieved his first Formula One win, and Mercedes's first of the season, along with Hamilton coming in second, at the São Paulo Grand Prix.

Mercedes finished the 2022 season third in the Constructors' Championship with the one win at São Paulo marking their best result of the season. Russell finished 4th in the Drivers' Championship having scored the win in Brazil plus a pole position in Hungary. Hamilton finished 6th in the Drivers' Championship marking the first time in his career he finished outside the top 5, with 2022 also marking the first time Hamilton had failed to score a pole position or Grand Prix win during a season.

After continuing to struggle with their radical "zero-pods" design in the 2023 season, Mercedes opted to replace Technical Director Mike Elliott with James Allison, with Elliott becoming Chief Technical Officer. This change occurred on 21 April 2023.

Mercedes finished 2023 second in the Constructors' Championship, 3 points ahead of Ferrari. The season however still was disappointing as the team failed to secure a win for the first time since 2011. The closest the team came to winning was at the United States Grand Prix where Hamilton finished 0.3 seconds behind World Champion Max Verstappen before he was disqualified for his rear skid blocks being worn below the limit. Hamilton finished 2023 third in the Drivers' Championship with 6 podiums, with the highlight of his season being breaking the record for the most pole positions at a single circuit after he took his 9th pole at the Hungaroring during the Hungarian Grand Prix. Russell had a miserable season finishing 8th in the Drivers' Championship with 2 podiums.

The team admitted the W15 will have a completely different concept for the 2024 season with their intentions to be trying to catch up to pace setters Red Bull for their hope of claiming the championship or fighting for wins. Mercedes secured consecutive victories at the Austrian and British Grands Prix, the latter marking Hamilton's first victory since 2021 and breaking Michael Schumacher's record of most victories at a single circuit. Mercedes secured two more wins at the Belgian (inherited by Hamilton for his last win with the team after Russell was disqualified) and Las Vegas Grands Prix to finish fourth in the Constructors' Championship. In the Drivers' Championship, Russell finished sixth, ahead of the departing Hamilton in seventh.

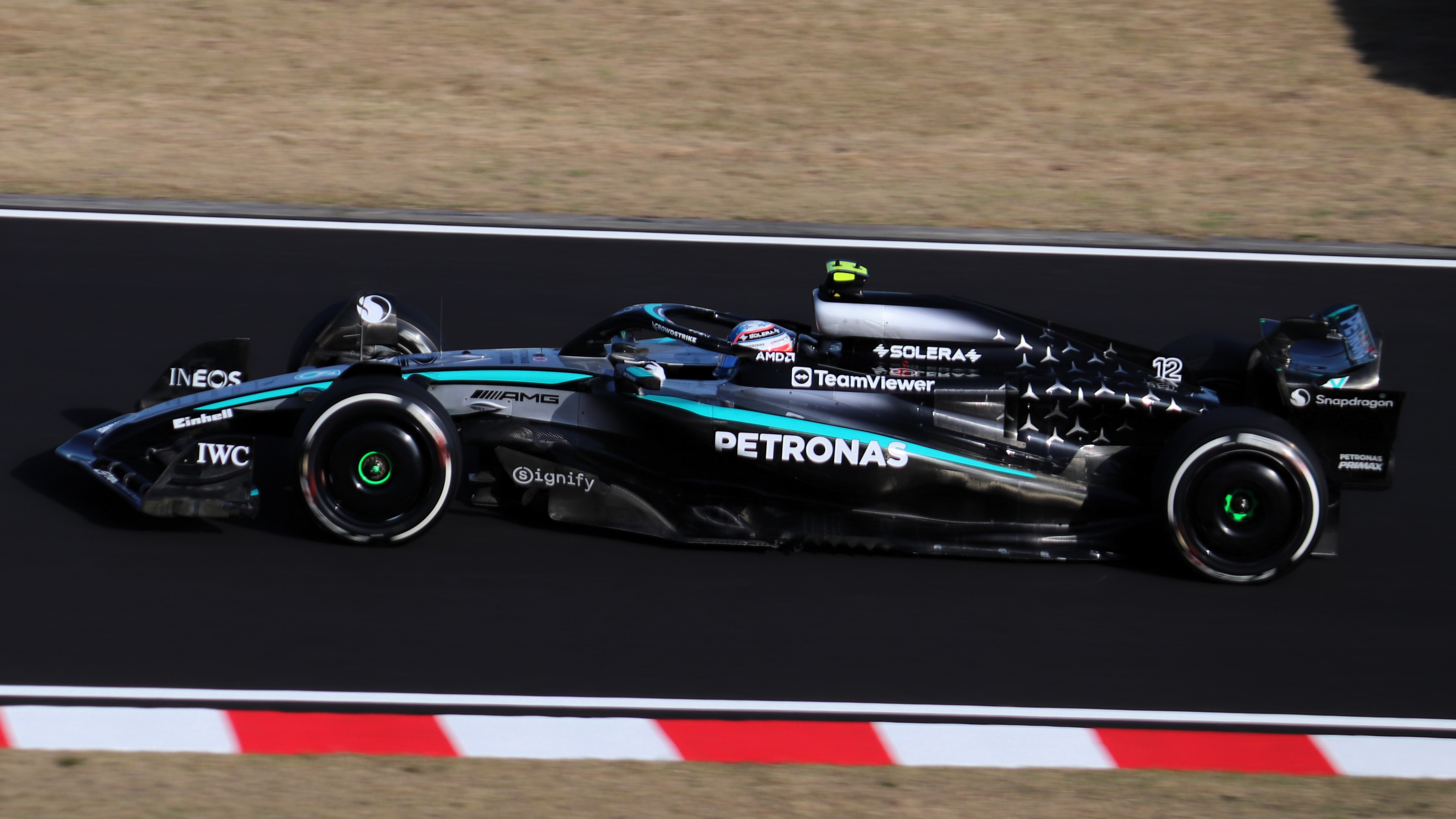
Mercedes junior driver Kimi Antonelli made his debut with the team in 2025. He took three podiums.

On 1 February 2024, Mercedes confirmed Hamilton would leave the team after 12 years, with the seven-time champion signing a multi-year contract to drive for Ferrari from 2025 onwards after he activated an exit clause in his contract. Mercedes junior driver Kimi Antonelli was announced as his replacement on 31 August 2024. On 19 December 2024, Bottas was announced to be rejoining the team as a reserve driver. Bottas left Mercedes ahead of the 2026 season to join the new Cadillac team.

Outside of an off weekend in Monaco, Russell consistently finished in the points and won in Canada and Singapore, ultimately tying his best finish of fourth in 2022 in the Drivers' Championship, while Antonelli, who obtained his maiden podium in Canada, finished in seventh. Mercedes overall finished in second in the Constructors' Championship.

In 2025, Wolff sold a portion of his shareholding to George Kurtz, the CEO and founder of cybersecurity firm CrowdStrike, making Kurtz a co‑owner of the team. Kurtz also joined the team's strategic steering committee and was appointed technology advisor, serving alongside Wolff, Mercedes-Benz chairman Ola Källenius, and INEOS chairman Sir Jim Ratcliffe. Wolff remains team principal and CEO.

==== Returning to championship contention (2026–present) ====
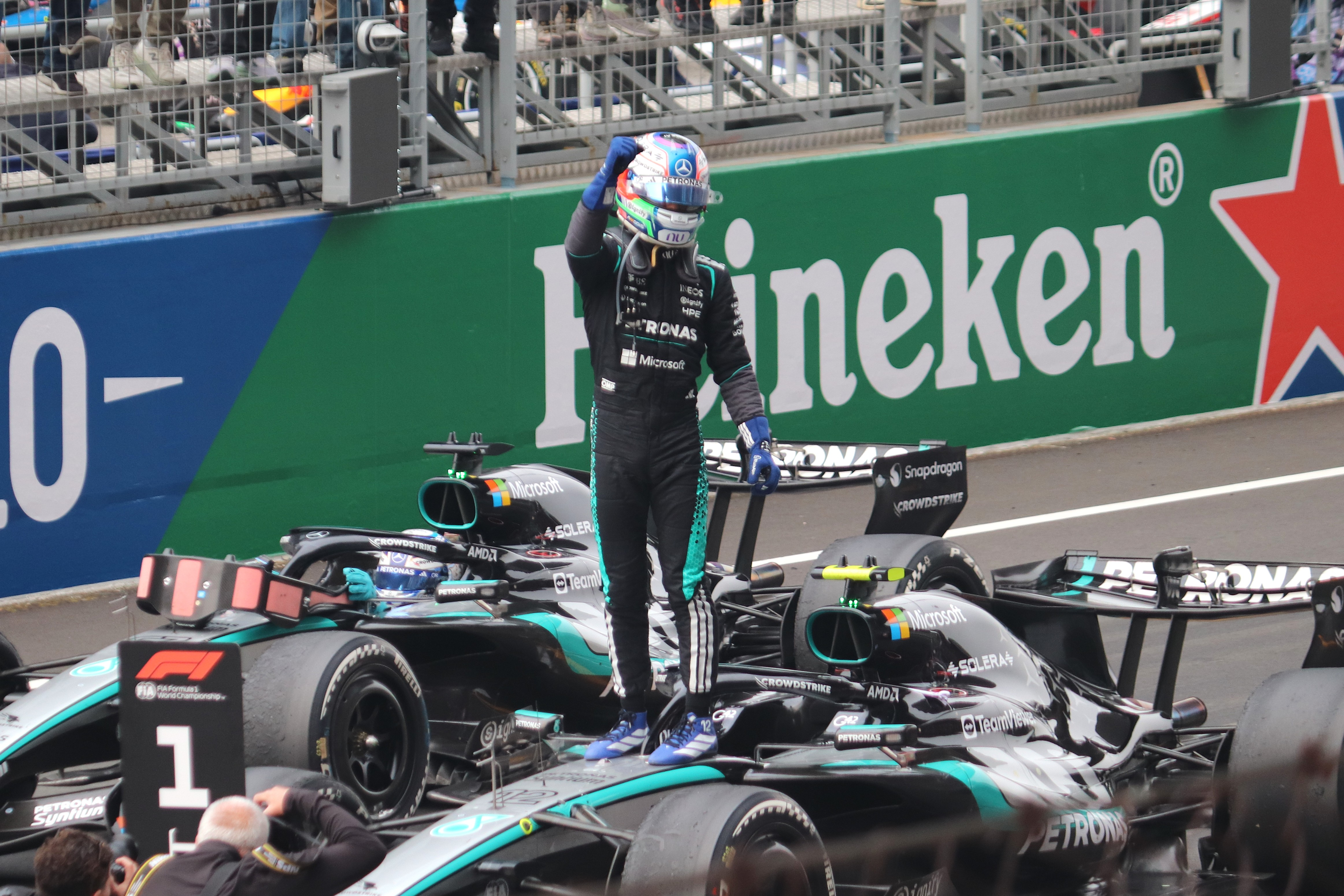
At the Chinese Grand Prix, Antonelli became the youngest polesitter in Formula One, and the first Italian driver to win a Grand Prix since 2006.

Going into the 2026 season, pundits and bookies predicted that Mercedes would have a strong season amidst new regulations. The Mercedes W17 was indeed dominant in the first two races it has entered, both times securing 1-2 finishes; Russell won ahead of Antonelli at the Australian Grand Prix after surviving an early attack from the Ferraris of Hamilton and Charles Leclerc, he won the Chinese sprint ahead of both Ferraris after Antonelli hit early trouble, and Antonelli claimed his maiden win ahead of Russell and Hamilton in the Grand Prix. Antonelli then became the youngest driver in F1 history to lead the World Championship after his victory in the Japanese Grand Prix, and furthermore, at the Miami Grand Prix, became the first driver in Formula One history to convert his first three consecutive pole positions into wins at the same events.

==== Hybrid era statistics ====
| Season | Chassis | Races | Wins | Pole positions | 1–2 finishes | Podiums | Fastest laps | Average winning margin | Points | Percentage of available points | WDC | WCC |
|---|---|---|---|---|---|---|---|---|---|---|---|---|
| 2014 | Mercedes F1 W05 Hybrid | 19 | 16 | 18 | 11 | 31 | 12 | 23.2 seconds | 701 | 82% | 1st, 2nd | 1st |
| 2015 | Mercedes F1 W06 Hybrid | 19 | 16 | 18 | 12 | 32 | 13 | 19.7 seconds | 703 | 86% | 1st, 2nd | 1st |
| 2016 | Mercedes F1 W07 Hybrid | 21 | 19 | 20 | 8 | 33 | 9 | 14.6 seconds | 765 | 85% | 1st, 2nd | 1st |
| 2017 | Mercedes AMG F1 W08 EQ Power+ | 20 | 12 | 15 | 4 | 26 | 9 | 13.1 seconds | 668 | 78% | 1st, 3rd | 1st |
| 2018 | Mercedes AMG F1 W09 EQ Power+ | 21 | 11 | 13 | 4 | 25 | 10 | 6.8 seconds | 655 | 73% | 1st, 5th | 1st |
| 2019 | Mercedes AMG F1 W10 EQ Power+ | 21 | 15 | 10 | 9 | 32 | 9 | 11.8 seconds | 739 | 80% | 1st, 2nd | 1st |
| 2020 | Mercedes-AMG F1 W11 EQ Performance | 17 | 13 | 15 | 5 | 25 | 9 | 15.6 seconds | 573 | 77% | 1st, 2nd | 1st |
| 2021 | Mercedes-AMG F1 W12 E Performance | 22 | 9 | 9 | 0 | 28 | 10 | 19.5 seconds | 613.5 | 64% | 2nd, 3rd | 1st |
| 2022 | Mercedes-AMG F1 W13 E Performance | 22 | 1 | 1 | 1 | 17 | 6 | 1.5 seconds | 515 | 49% | 4th, 6th | 3rd |
| 2023 | Mercedes-AMG F1 W14 E Performance | 22 | 0 | 1 | 0 | 8 | 5 | N/A | 409 | 39% | 3rd, 8th | 2nd |
| 2024 | Mercedes-AMG F1 W15 E Performance | 24 | 4 | 4 | 1 | 9 | 4 | 2.8 seconds | 468 | 41% | 6th, 7th | 4th |
| 2025 | Mercedes-AMG F1 W16 E Performance | 24 | 2 | 3 | 0 | 12 | 6 | 2.9 seconds | 469 | 42% | 4th, 7th | 2nd |

== Engine supplier ==
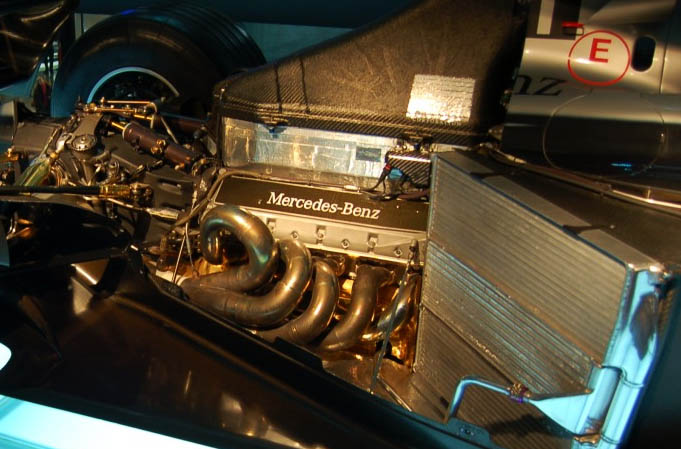
The Mercedes-Benz FO110J V10 engine which was built in Brixworth.

Mercedes-Benz returned to Formula One as an engine supplier in 1994 in partnership with Ilmor, a British independent high-performance autosport engineering company with its manufacturing centre based in Brixworth, Northamptonshire. After acquisition by Mercedes, the company is now called Mercedes AMG High Performance Powertrains. It supplied Sauber for one season, then switched to McLaren in 1995 for a highly successful 20-year partnership. In 2009, Mercedes also became suppliers of Brawn GP (later acquired to become the Mercedes-Benz factory team) and Force India, later known as Racing Point and eventually, Aston Martin F1, until the 2025 season. A fourth team was added to the supplying program in 2014, Williams. The 20-year long partnership with McLaren ended in advance of the 2015 season, before resuming in 2021. Mercedes supplied engines to the Lotus F1 Team for one season in 2015, and Manor for one season in 2016.

For the 2026 season, Mercedes supplies engines to Alpine, McLaren, and Williams, in addition to their own team.

== Junior team ==
As of 2026, there have been twenty-two drivers linked to the Mercedes junior team, of which ten are still members.

Four of the graduates of the Mercedes junior team have driven in Formula One. Pascal Wehrlein was the first graduate to race in F1 from 2016 to 2017. As of 2026, George Russell and Kimi Antonelli are the only drivers to have driven for Mercedes, with the former having done so since 2022 and the latter starting in 2025. Esteban Ocon is the only other former driver to be participating in the 2026 season.

== Sponsorships ==
In December 2009, the team suffered an early setback when it was discovered that a planned £80m sponsorship arrangement that had been signed by predecessor Brawn GP with Henkel in July was invalid. Henkel claimed they were unaware of the deal and had no interest in Formula One; the deal allegedly was made by a former Henkel employee on stolen company stationery for the purposes of defrauding the company. On 22 December, Henkel announced that the dispute with the team had been resolved with a mutual agreement and that legal action would not be pursued, although the team would work with the German prosecutor's office to clarify the matter.

On 21 December, the team confirmed that the number one Malaysian oil and gas company Petronas would join the team as title sponsor. Petronas was based in Kuala Lumpur where the Sepang International Circuit (SIC) is located. From 2010, the team competed under the full title of Mercedes GP Petronas Formula One Team. According to some reports, the arrangement is valued at €30m each year. On 28 September 2022, Mercedes and Petronas announced a multi-year renewal of the title and technical partnership from the 2026 season onwards.

On 25 January 2010, the team's livery was unveiled publicly at the Mercedes-Benz Museum in Stuttgart, with Schumacher and Rosberg in attendance. The cars race in the traditional silver colours of Mercedes-Benz and retains Brawn GP sponsor MIGfx. In 2013, the team signed a multi-year deal with mobile company BlackBerry which ended after the 2015 season. The team also had other major partners such as Monster Energy, Puma, Swissquote (until 2014). Qualcomm, UBS, Epson, Bose & Hugo Boss were added as sponsors in 2015, while Wihuri joined Mercedes together with Bottas in 2017. Before the 2017 Bahrain Grand Prix, Mercedes added software company Tibco as one of their partners. In 2018, Tommy Hilfiger took over from Hugo Boss as the team's clothing supplier with Hamilton becoming a brand ambassador for the company and participating in the #WhatsYourDrive Promotion. For 2019, the team made a global partnership with CrowdStrike and Marriott Bonvoy. For the 2020 Formula One World Championship, the team welcomed two new partners; Ineos and AMD. In 2021, the team signed a sponsorship deal with TeamViewer, a German technology company, which became the first partner of both Mercedes F1 and FE teams.

In 2025, Adidas took over from Tommy Hilfiger as the team's clothing supplier.

=== FTX sponsorship and lawsuit filing ===
The Mercedes F1 team had previously partnered with FTX, a Bahamas-based cryptocurrency exchange company. Mercedes suspended its sponsorship deal with FTX and removed the company's logos from their cars prior to the 2022 São Paulo Grand Prix due to FTX's financial difficulties, with the cryptocurrency firm filing for chapter 11 bankruptcy soon after, thereby formally ending the sponsorship deal. The activities of FTX were subsequently revealed to have resulted in a multi-billion dollar fraud. A lawsuit against Mercedes F1 team for promoting FTX was filed to a federal court in Miami in November 2023.

=== Kingspan Group sponsorship controversy ===
On 1 December 2021, the team initially signed a sponsorship deal with the Kingspan Group. This announcement proved controversial due to Kingspan being under scrutiny in the Grenfell Tower inquiry, an inquiry about the 2017 Grenfell Tower Fire where 72 people lost their lives. The Mercedes-Kingspan Group deal led to criticism from Grenfell United (made up of survivors and families of victims of the Grenfell Tower fire) and then-UK government minister Michael Gove. Mercedes subsequently agreed to review its decision with Mercedes F1 team boss, Toto Wolff even offering to meet and listen to the Grenfell fire survivors. On 8 December 2021, it was announced the deal between Kingspan and Mercedes F1 Team had been terminated with immediate effect.

== Racing record ==
- Constructors' Championships winning percentage: 52.9%
- Drivers' Championships winning percentage: 52.6%
- Winning percentage: 39.6%

(Bold indicates championships won.)

| Year | Name | Car | Engine | Tyres | No. | Drivers | Points | WCC |
|---|---|---|---|---|---|---|---|---|
| 1954 | (Germany) Daimler-Benz AG | W196 | M196 2.5 L8 | C | —N/a (Note: Individual driver numbers were not allocated at the time, as numbers differed by event.) | (Argentina) **Juan Manuel Fangio** (West Germany) Hans Herrmann (West Germany) Karl Kling (West Germany) Hermann Lang | —N/a (Note: The Constructors' Championship was not awarded until the 1958 season.) | |
| 1955 | (Germany) Daimler-Benz AG | W196 | M196 2.5 L8 | C | —N/a | (Argentina) **Juan Manuel Fangio** (West Germany) Hans Herrmann (West Germany) Karl Kling (United Kingdom) Stirling Moss (France) André Simon (Italy) Piero Taruffi | —N/a | |
1956 – 2009: Mercedes-Benz did not compete as a constructor.
| 2010 | (Germany) Mercedes GP Petronas F1 Team | MGP W01 | FO 108X 2.4 V8 | B | 3. 4. | (Germany) Michael Schumacher (Germany) Nico Rosberg | 214 | 4th |
| 2011 | (Germany) Mercedes GP Petronas F1 Team | MGP W02 | FO 108Y 2.4 V8 | P | 7. 8. | (Germany) Michael Schumacher (Germany) Nico Rosberg | 165 | 4th |
| 2012 | (Germany) Mercedes-AMG Petronas F1 Team | F1 W03 | FO 108Z 2.4 V8 | P | 7. 8. | (Germany) Michael Schumacher (Germany) Nico Rosberg | 142 | 5th |
| 2013 | (Germany) Mercedes-AMG Petronas F1 Team | F1 W04 | FO 108F 2.4 V8 | P | 9. 10. | (Germany) Nico Rosberg (United Kingdom) Lewis Hamilton | 360 | 2nd |
| 2014 | (Germany) Mercedes-AMG Petronas F1 Team | F1 W05 Hybrid | PU106A Hybrid 1.6 V6 t | P | 6. 44. | (Germany) Nico Rosberg (United Kingdom) **Lewis Hamilton** | **701** | **1st** |
| 2015 | (Germany) Mercedes-AMG Petronas F1 Team | F1 W06 Hybrid | PU106B Hybrid 1.6 V6 t | P | 6. 44. | (Germany) Nico Rosberg (United Kingdom) **Lewis Hamilton** | **703** | **1st** |
| 2016 | (Germany) Mercedes-AMG Petronas F1 Team | F1 W07 Hybrid | PU106C Hybrid 1.6 V6 t | P | 6. 44. | (Germany) **Nico Rosberg** (United Kingdom) Lewis Hamilton | **765** | **1st** |
| 2017 | (Germany) Mercedes-AMG Petronas Motorsport | F1 W08 EQ Power+ | M08 EQ Power+ 1.6 V6 t | P | 44. 77. | (United Kingdom) **Lewis Hamilton** (Finland) Valtteri Bottas | **668** | **1st** |
| 2018 | (Germany) Mercedes-AMG Petronas Motorsport | F1 W09 EQ Power+ | M09 EQ Power+ 1.6 V6 t | P | 44. 77. | (United Kingdom) **Lewis Hamilton** (Finland) Valtteri Bottas | **655** | **1st** |
| 2019 | (Germany) Mercedes AMG Petronas Motorsport | F1 W10 EQ Power+ | M10 EQ Power+ 1.6 V6 t | P | 44. 77. | (United Kingdom) **Lewis Hamilton** (Finland) Valtteri Bottas | **739** | **1st** |
| 2020 | (Germany) Mercedes-AMG Petronas F1 Team | F1 W11 EQ Performance | M11 EQ Performance 1.6 V6 t | P | 44. 63. 77. | (United Kingdom) **Lewis Hamilton** (United Kingdom) George Russell (Finland) Valtteri Bottas | **573** | **1st** |
| 2021 | (Germany) Mercedes-AMG Petronas F1 Team | F1 W12 E Performance | M12 E Performance 1.6 V6 t | P | 44. 77. | (United Kingdom) Lewis Hamilton (Finland) Valtteri Bottas | **613.5** | **1st** |
| 2022 | (Germany) Mercedes-AMG Petronas F1 Team | F1 W13 E Performance | M13 E Performance 1.6 V6 t | P | 44. 63. | (United Kingdom) Lewis Hamilton (United Kingdom) George Russell | 515 | 3rd |
| 2023 | (Germany) Mercedes-AMG Petronas F1 Team | F1 W14 E Performance | M14 E Performance 1.6 V6 t | P | 44. 63. | (United Kingdom) Lewis Hamilton (United Kingdom) George Russell | 409 | 2nd |
| 2024 | (Germany) Mercedes-AMG Petronas F1 Team | F1 W15 E Performance | M15 E Performance 1.6 V6 t | P | 44. 63. | (United Kingdom) Lewis Hamilton (United Kingdom) George Russell | 468 | 4th |
| 2025 | (Germany) Mercedes-AMG Petronas F1 Team | F1 W16 E Performance | M16 E Performance 1.6 V6 t | P | 12. 63. | (Italy) Kimi Antonelli (United Kingdom) George Russell | 469 | 2nd |
| 2026 | (Germany) Mercedes-AMG Petronas F1 Team | F1 W17 E Performance | M17 E Performance 1.6 V6 t | P | 12. 63. | (Italy) **Kimi Antonelli** (United Kingdom) George Russell | 652* | 1st |

* Season still in progress.

=== Drivers' Champions ===
The following drivers won the Formula One Drivers' Championship for Mercedes:

- (Argentina) Juan Manuel Fangio (1954, 1955)
- (United Kingdom) Lewis Hamilton (2014, 2015, 2017, 2018, 2019, 2020)
- (Germany) Nico Rosberg (2016)
- (Italy) Kimi Antonelli (2026)

=== Esports ===
| Year | Name | No. | Drivers | Points | WCC |
|---|---|---|---|---|---|
| 2018 | (Germany) Mercedes-AMG Petronas Esports Team | 72. 12. | (United Kingdom) **Brendon Leigh** (Hungary) Daniel Bereznay | **382** | **1st** |
| 2019 | (Germany) Mercedes-AMG Petronas Esports Team | 72. 95. n/a | (United Kingdom) Brendon Leigh (Poland) Patryk Krutyi (Australia) Daniel Shields | 83 | 8th |
| 2020 | (Germany) Mercedes-AMG Petronas Esports Team | 72. 94. 20. | (United Kingdom) Brendon Leigh (Netherlands) Bono Huis (Iran) Bardia Boroumand | 107 | 4th |
| 2021 | (Germany) Mercedes-AMG Petronas Esports Team | 34. 95. | (Netherlands) **Jarno Opmeer** (Spain) Dani Moreno | **295** | **1st** |
| 2022 | (Germany) Mercedes-AMG Petronas Esports Team | 34. 26. 25. | (Netherlands) Jarno Opmeer (Spain) Dani Moreno (United Kingdom) Jake Benham | 158 | 4th |
| 2023–24 | (Germany) Mercedes-AMG Petronas Esports Team | 5. 25. 15. | (Netherlands) Jarno Opmeer (United Kingdom) Jake Benham (Hungary) Daniel Bereznay | 197 | 4th |
| 2025 | (Germany) Mercedes-AMG Petronas Esports Team | 15. 62. 25. | (Hungary) Daniel Bereznay (Hungary) István Puki (United Kingdom) Jake Benham | **198** | **3rd** |
| 2026 | (Germany) Mercedes-AMG Petronas Esports Team | 11. 39. 74. | (Austria) Julian Klaffenböck (Netherlands) Thomas Ronhaar (Netherlands) Tycho Hardy | 61 | 8th |

==== Esports Drivers' Champions ====
The following drivers won the Formula One Esports Drivers' Championship for Mercedes:

- (United Kingdom) Brendon Leigh (2018).
- (Netherlands) Jarno Opmeer (2021).

=== Complete F1 Esports Series results ===
(key (results in bold indicate pole position; results in italics indicate fastest lap)

| Year | Chassis | Drivers | 1 | 2 | 3 | 4 | 5 | 6 | 7 | 8 | 9 | 10 | 11 | 12 | Points | WCC |
|---|---|---|---|---|---|---|---|---|---|---|---|---|---|---|---|---|
| 2018 | F1 W09 EQ Power+ | | AUS | CHN | AZE | FRA | GBR | BEL | GER | SIN | USA | ABU | | | 382 | 1st |
| 2018 | F1 W09 EQ Power+ | (United Kingdom) Brendon Leigh | **1** | 1 | 2 | **1** | **1** | 5 | 2 | 1 | **1** | 5 | | | 382 | 1st |
| 2018 | F1 W09 EQ Power+ | (Hungary) Daniel Bereznay | 6 | **2** | **3** | 4 | 12 | **1** | 6 | 4 | 2 | 1 | | | 382 | 1st |
| 2018 | F1 W09 EQ Power+ | (United Kingdom) Harry Jacks | | | | | | | | | | | | | 382 | 1st |
| 2019 | F1 W10 EQ Power+ | | BHR | CHN | AZE | CAN | RBR | GBR | GER | BEL | ITA | JPN | USA | BRA | 83 | 8th |
| 2019 | F1 W10 EQ Power+ | (United Kingdom) Brendon Leigh | 5 | 11 | 4 | 2 | 14 | 6 | 17 | 11 | 6 | 7 | 3 | 11 | 83 | 8th |
| 2019 | F1 W10 EQ Power+ | (Poland) Patryk Kutryj | 15 | 8 | 11 | 20 | 9 | 19 | 11 | 18 | | 14 | 12 | | 83 | 8th |
| 2019 | F1 W10 EQ Power+ | (Australia) Daniel Shields | | | | | | | | | 17 | | | 13 | 83 | 8th |
| 2020 | F1 W11 EQ Performance | | BHR | VIE | CHN | NED | CAN | RBR | GBR | BEL | ITA | JPN | MEX | BRA | 107 | 4th |
| 2020 | F1 W11 EQ Performance | (United Kingdom) Brendon Leigh | 7 | 4 | 17 | 6 | 17 | 13 | 10 | 4 | 3 | 15 | 2 | 4 | 107 | 4th |
| 2020 | F1 W11 EQ Performance | (Netherlands) Bono Huis | 11 | 13 | | 8 | 16 | 8 | 12 | 7 | 7 | 11 | 10 | 9 | 107 | 4th |
| 2020 | F1 W11 EQ Performance | (Iran) Bari Broumand | | | 11 | | | | | | | | | | 107 | 4th |
| 2021 | F1 W11 E Performance | | BHR | CHN | RBR | GBR | ITA | BEL | POR | NED | USA | EMI | MEX | BRA | 295 | 1st |
| 2021 | F1 W11 E Performance | (Netherlands) Jarno Opmeer | 4 | 1 | **1** | 9 | **2** | 2 | 7 | 6 | 1 | 2 | 1 | 4 | 295 | 1st |
| 2021 | F1 W11 E Performance | (Spain) Dani Moreno | 5 | 8 | 10 | 2 | 7 | 16 | 4 | 1 | 7 | 7 | 4 | Ret | 295 | 1st |
| 2021 | F1 W11 E Performance | (Netherlands) Bono Huis | | | | | | | | | | | | | 295 | 1st |
| 2022 | F1 W13 E Performance | | BHR | EMI | GBR | RBR | BEL | NED | ITA | MEX | USA | JPN | BRA | UAE | 158 | 4th |
| 2022 | F1 W13 E Performance | (Netherlands) Jarno Opmeer | 2 | 11 | 5 | 4 | 6 | 4 | 11 | 1 | 1 | Ret | 8 | 6 | 158 | 4th |
| 2022 | F1 W13 E Performance | (Spain) Dani Moreno | 5 | 5 | 13 | 8 | 13 | 7 | | | | | | | 158 | 4th |
| 2022 | F1 W13 E Performance | (United Kingdom) Jake Benham | | | | | | | 13 | 8 | 12 | 15 | 9 | 12 | 158 | 4th |
| 2023–24 | F1 W14 E Performance | | BHR | JED | RBR | GBR | BEL | NED | USA | MEX | BRA | LVG | QAT | UAE | 197 | 4th |
| 2023–24 | F1 W14 E Performance | (Hungary) Daniel Bereznay | 6 | | | **3** | 6 | | | 12 | 10 | | | 3 | 197 | 4th |
| 2023–24 | F1 W14 E Performance | (Netherlands) Jarno Opmeer | 2 | 7 | Ret | 1 | 5 | 7 | 8 | 8 | 3 | 3 | 6 | 6 | 197 | 4th |
| 2023–24 | F1 W14 E Performance | (United Kingdom) Jake Benham | | 5 | 4 | | | 8 | 13 | | | 19 | 17 | | 197 | 4th |
| 2025 | F1 W15 E Performance | | AUS | CHN | BHR | SAU | GBR | BEL | NED | USA | MXC | SAP | QAT | ABU | 198 | 3rd |
| 2025 | F1 W15 E Performance | (Hungary) Daniel Bereznay | 3 | 3 | 9 | Ret | 2 | 5 | | 8 | 14 | 10 | | 8 | 198 | 3rd |
| 2025 | F1 W15 E Performance | (Hungary) István Puki | 2 | 8 | 2 | | | 2 | 17 | 12 | 16 | | 7 | | 198 | 3rd |
| 2025 | F1 W15 E Performance | (United Kingdom) Jake Benham | | | | 3 | 3 | | 4 | | | 5 | 15 | 4 | 198 | 3rd |
| 2026 | F1 W17 E Performance | | CHN | JPN | BHR | SAU | CAT | GBR | BEL | NED | USA | MXC | SAP | ABU | 61 | 8th |
| 2026 | F1 W17 E Performance | (Austria) Julian Klaffenböck | 14 | 16 | 11 | 7 | | 10 | 18 | | 18 | 12 | | | 61 | 8th |
| 2026 | F1 W17 E Performance | (Netherlands) Thomas Ronhaar | 11 | 13 | 4 | 11 | 7 | 2 | 17 | 18 | 6 | 6 | 9 | 13 | 61 | 8th |
| 2026 | F1 W17 E Performance | (Netherlands) Tycho Hardy | | | | | 14 | | | 14 | | | 16 | 14 | 61 | 8th |

== See also ==
- Mercedes AMG High Performance Powertrains, manufacturer of Mercedes-Benz's Formula One engines.
- Mercedes-Benz in motorsport, Daimler AG has entered Mercedes-Benz into other forms of motorsport.

== Footnotes ==
Achievements
| Preceded by Red Bull Racing | Formula One Constructors' Champion; 2014–2015–2016–2017–2018–2019–2020–2021 | Succeeded by Red Bull Racing |
| Preceded by McLaren | Formula One Constructors' Champion; 2026 | Succeeded by TBD |
Awards
| Preceded by Daniel Ricciardo | Lorenzo Bandini Trophy; 2015 | Succeeded by Max Verstappen |
| Preceded by Chicago Cubs | Laureus World Team of the Year; 2018 | Succeeded by France national football team |
