= Turkish Karting Championship =

The Turkish Karting Championship is a kart racing series based in Turkey. The series was debuted in 2001, In 2020 it was run as a cup due to COVID.

== Champions ==
=== ICA/KF2/125cc Open/Formula Senior ===
Season	Driver
2006	(Turkey) Ercan Önder
2007	(Turkey) Canberk Yaras
2008	(Turkey) Ziya Dokucu
2009	(Turkey) Gun Tasdelen
2011	(Turkey) Gun Tasdelen
2013	(Turkey) Orchun Aydemir
2014	(Turkey) Berkay Besler

=== ICA Junior/KF3/Formula Junior ===
Season	Driver
2001	(Turkey) Cemil Çipa
2002	(Turkey) Cemil Çipa
2005	(Turkey) Ercan Önder
2006	(Turkey) Batu Ergokcen
2007	(Turkey) Ziya Dokucu
2008	(Turkey) Kaan Önder
2009	(Turkey) Kaan Önder
2010	(Turkey) Soyhan Cuvalcioglu
2011	(Turkey) Batuhan Ünlü
2012	(Turkey) Berkay Besler
2013	(Turkey) Berkay Besler
2014	(Turkey) Mert Dalkiran

=== Mini ===
Season	Driver
2004	(Turkey) Emir Zümrüt
2005	(Turkey) Emre Senturk
2006	(Turkey) Emre Senturk
2007	(Turkey) Emir Kalafatoglu
2008	(Turkey) Emre Senturk
2009	(Turkey) Batuhan Ünlü
2010	(Turkey) Ayhancan Güven
2011	(Turkey) Can Luca Ünsal
2012	(Turkey) Mert Dalkiran
2013	(Turkey) Sarp Atasever
2014	(Turkey) Zekai Özen

=== Formula Master ===
Season	Driver
2013	(Turkey) Kamil Kerem Zengin
2014	(Turkey) Mehmet Yaman
