= RB VCARB 01 =

2024 Formula One car

- Yuki Tsunoda driving a VCARB 01 during the Dutch Grand Prix
- Category: Formula One
- Constructor: RB
- Designers: Jody Egginton (Technical Director); Paolo Marabini (Chief Designer); Trygve Rangen (Chief Designer, Mechanical and Systems); Guillaume Dezoteux (Head of Vehicle Performance); Claudio Balestri (Head of Vehicle Dynamics); Guru Johl (Head of Aerodynamics); Peter Machin (Chief Aerodynamicist)
- Predecessor: AlphaTauri AT04
- Successor: Racing Bulls VCARB 02

Technical specifications
- Chassis: Carbon-fibre monocoque and Halo safety cockpit protection device
- Suspension (front): Multi-link pull-rod actuated dampers and anti-roll bar
- Suspension (rear): Double wishbone push-rod springs, dampers, and anti-roll bar
- Engine: Honda RBPTH002 1.6 L (98 cu in) direct injection (jointly developed and supplied by Honda and Hitachi Astemo) V6 turbocharged engine limited to 15,000 rpm in a rear mid-mounted, rear-wheel-drive layout
- Electric motor: Honda Kinetic and thermal energy recovery systems
- Transmission: Red Bull Technology Hydraulically actuated multiplate
- Battery: Honda-Lithium-ion-battery
- Power: 1080hp (805kW)
- Weight: 798 kg (1,759 lbs)
- Fuel: Esso / Mobil Synergy (Note: Orlen branding appeared on the VCARB 01, but the car used ExxonMobil fuels)
- Lubricants: Ravenol
- Brakes: Brembo 6-piston aluminium-lithium calipers, Brembo carbon discs and carbon pads
- Tyres: Pirelli P Zero (Dry); Pirelli Cinturato (Wet)
- Clutch: Hydraulically-activated carbon multiplate

Competition history
- Notable entrants: Visa Cash App RB F1 Team
- Notable drivers: 3. (Australia) Daniel Ricciardo; 22. (Japan) Yuki Tsunoda; 30. (New Zealand) Liam Lawson
- Debut: 2024 Bahrain Grand Prix
- Last event: 2024 Abu Dhabi Grand Prix
Races	Wins	Podiums	Poles	F/Laps
24	0	0	0	1

The RB VCARB 01 (originally known as the AlphaTauri AT05) is a Formula One car constructed by RB for the 2024 Formula One World Championship. It is the first chassis built and designed by the team. The car was driven by Daniel Ricciardo and Yuki Tsunoda, with Liam Lawson replacing Ricciardo, who departed the team after the Singapore Grand Prix, for the final six races of the season. Ayumu Iwasa held reserve driver duties. The car made its competitive debut at the Bahrain Grand Prix. The car achieved one fastest lap from Ricciardo in Singapore.

== Background ==
The Visa Cash App RB F1 Team is a Formula One racing team that made its debut in the 2024 Formula One season. The team was previously named AlphaTauri and Toro Rosso due to their affiliations with Red Bull Racing as a feeder outfit since 2006. AlphaTauri competed from 2020 to 2023 in Formula One before announcing a rebranding in December 2023 alongside a new deal with Red Bull. The new team aimed to improve their competitiveness in the grid, with major sponsors Visa Inc. and Cash App to provide stability in finance and marketing, and a closer technical partnership to Red Bull.

Laurent Mekies was the team principal for RB, replacing Franz Tost who retired in 2023, as the team underwent significant operation restructure. The RB F1 team, which is based in Faenza, Italy, moved part of its operation in Bicester, England into a new facility in Milton Keynes. The team plans to operate the aerodynamics department in the facility by the end of the 2024 season. Mekies stated that RB would utilise the front and rear suspensions and gearbox from Red Bull in addition to the Honda RBPT power unit and engine.

The drivers' lineup was Daniel Ricciardo and Yuki Tsunoda with Liam Lawson named reserve driver for the 2024 season. All three drivers competed in the previous season of Formula One, earning 25 points to help AlphaTauri finish eighth in the constructors' standings. Ricciardo joined the team in July 2023 to replace Nyck de Vries, who was released after the British Grand Prix, and started in two races before sustaining a broken hand. As a result, Lawson filled in five races for the Australian and made his F1 debut at the 2023 Dutch Grand Prix. The predecessor of the VCARB 01, the AlphaTauri AT04, was cited as "one of the worst cars on the grid" by critics in the 2023 season.

== Development ==
=== Launch and pre-season ===
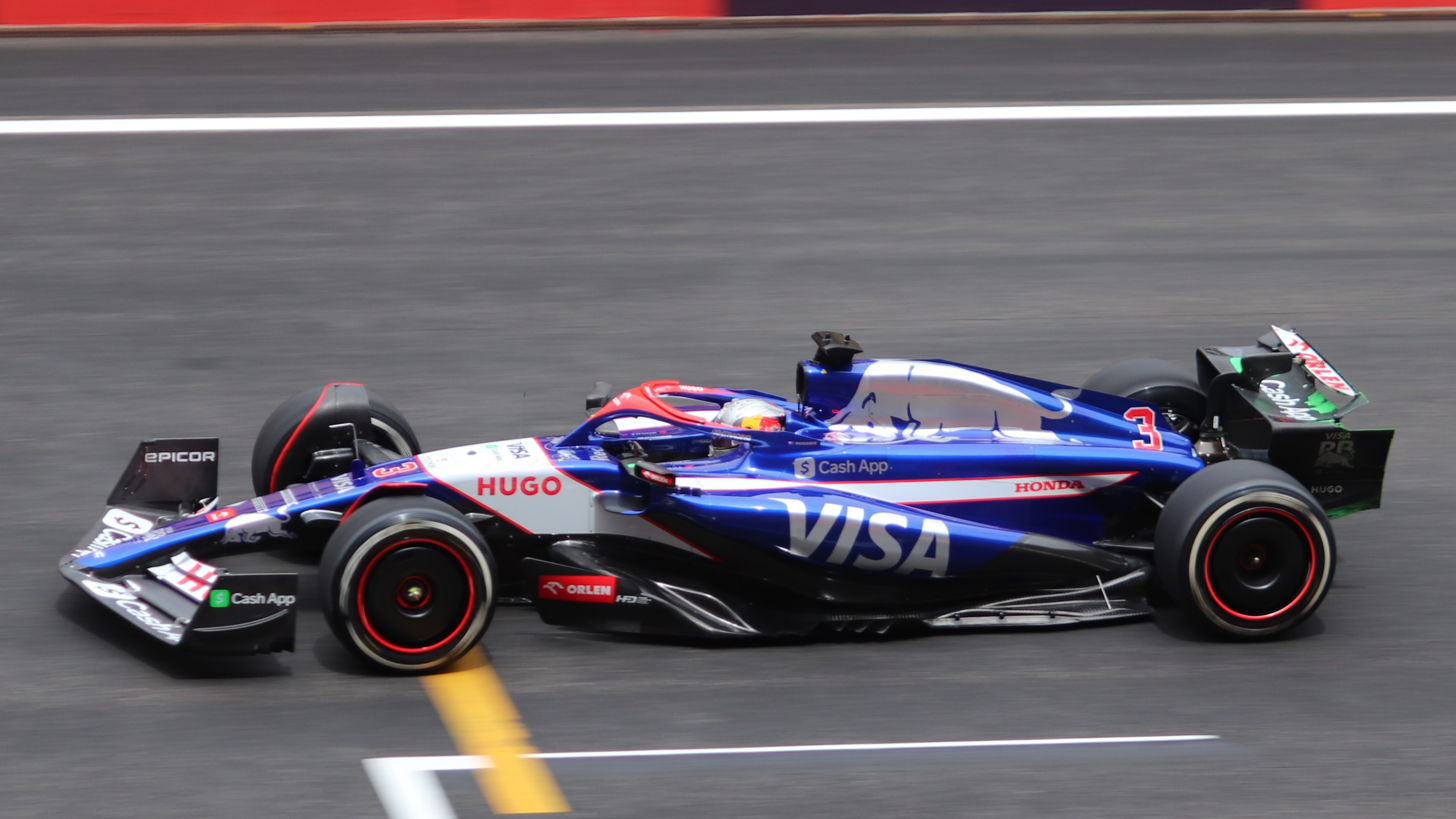
Ricciardo at the Chinese Grand Prix.

Laurent Mekies signed for RB, then known as AlphaTauri, as team principal in April 2023. Tim Goss, Alan Permane and Guillaume Cattelani were announced in January 2024 by RB as "key technical hires" ahead of the 2024 season. Permane was responsible for engineering operations on race weekends while Cattelani managed aerodynamics, vehicle performance, and technology on the car. The VCARB 01, the first Formula One car constructed by RB, was unveiled in a launch event at Las Vegas in February 2024. The car used Honda, as a named engine supplier to Red Bull Racing and RB, the latter since 2023, with both teams' engines badged as Honda RBPT.

Critics said the car displayed "some likeness" to the RB18 and RB19 of Red Bull Racing in the last two seasons. RB changed to a pull-rod front suspension, similar to Red Bull, with a different sidepod design in the lower and upper sections to allow more airflow towards the car's rear. The car, at the start of the season, mainly carried modified components from the AlphaTauri AT04 with the aerodynamic design brought in the 2023 Singapore Grand Prix. The upgrades involved a modification of the floor to lower static pressure to the floor edge and increase mass flow under the forward floor. The drum brake scoop inlets and rear suspensions were also redesigned.

After criticism to Red Bull GmbH, who owns RB and Red Bull Racing, for distributing information between teams, Mekies said the car "is not the Red Bull of last year" and that the shared parts do not benefit in performances. Testing began on 21 February 2024 in Sakhir at the Bahrain International Circuit and went for three days before the Bahrain Grand Prix on 2 March. Both Daniel Ricciardo and Yuki Tsunoda completed 367 laps in total during the testing period.

== Sponsorship and livery ==
The VCARB 01's livery was predominantly painted in blue with red pinstriping overlaid on the white stripes and silver charging bull logos. When the car was launched, some fans mocking the livery as a "tribute" to the Toro Rosso STR12, Toro Rosso STR13 and Toro Rosso STR14 due to its close resemblance to the liveries.

The VCARB 01 were also ran on special liveries throughout the season:

- In Miami, the cars were run in a striking pink and orange livery.
- In Singapore, the cars were run in a jeans livery.
- In Las Vegas, the cars were run in a glitter bluish livery. This livery was jokingly referred to the vibes of the Sauber Petronas era days by fans.

== Complete Formula One results ==
Key

Key
Colour	Result
Gold	Winner
Silver	Second place
Bronze	Third place
Green	Other points position
Blue	Other classified position
Blue	Not classified, finished (NC)
Purple	Not classified, retired (Ret)
Red	Did not qualify (DNQ)
Black	Disqualified (DSQ)
White	Did not start (DNS)
White	Race cancelled (C)
Blank	Did not practice (DNP)
Blank	Excluded (EX)
Blank	Did not arrive (DNA)
Blank	Withdrawn (WD)
Blank	Did not enter (empty cell)
Annotation	Meaning
P	Pole position
F	Fastest lap
Superscript number	Points-scoring position in sprint

Year	Entrant	Engine	Tyres	Drivers	Grands Prix																								Points	WCC
Year	Entrant	Engine	Tyres	Drivers	BHR	SAU	AUS	JPN	CHN	MIA	EMI	MON	CAN	ESP	AUT	GBR	HUN	BEL	NED	ITA	AZE	SIN	USA	MXC	SAP	LVG	QAT	ABU	Points	WCC
2024	Visa Cash App RB F1 Team	Honda RBPTH002	P	(Japan) Yuki Tsunoda	14	15	7	10	Ret	7^{8}	10	8	14	19	14	10	9	16	17	Ret	Ret	12	14	Ret	7	9	13	12	46	8th
2024	Visa Cash App RB F1 Team	Honda RBPTH002	P	(Australia) Daniel Ricciardo	13	16	12	Ret	Ret	15^{4}	13	12	8	15	9	13	12	10	12	13	13	18^{F}							46	8th
2024	Visa Cash App RB F1 Team	Honda RBPTH002	P	(New Zealand) Liam Lawson																			9	16	9	16	14	17†	46	8th
