= AlphaTauri AT02 =

Scuderia AlphaTauri racing car for the 2021 Formula One season

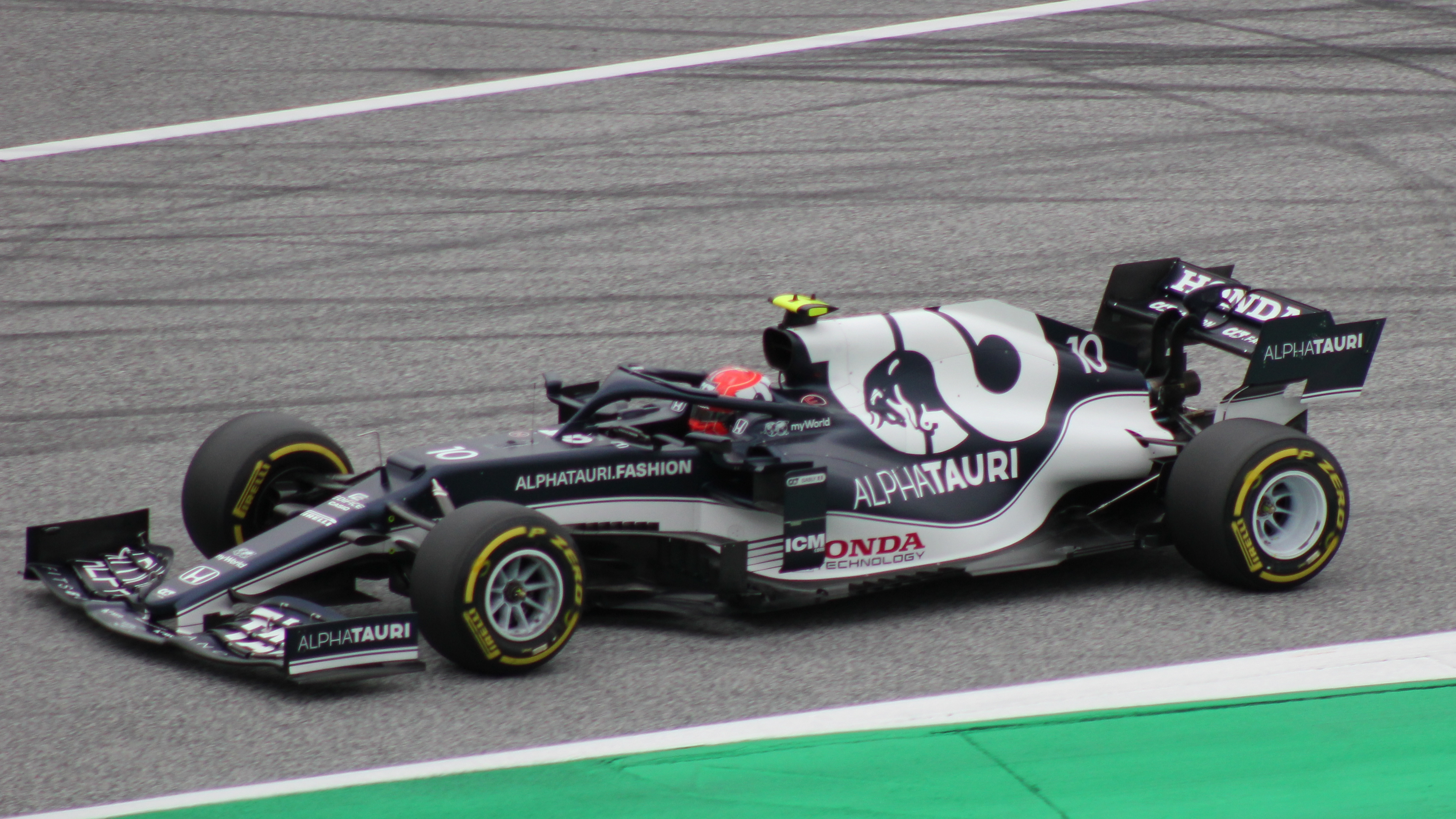
- Pierre Gasly in the AT02 during practice at the Austrian Grand Prix
- Category: Formula One
- Constructor: AlphaTauri
- Designers: Jody Egginton (Technical Director); Paolo Marabini (Chief Designer – Composites and Structures); Trygve Rangen (Chief Designer – Mechanical and Systems); Guillaume Dezoteux (Head of Vehicle Performance); Claudio Balestri (Head of Vehicle Dynamics); Dickon Balmforth (Head of Aerodynamics); Peter Machin (Chief Aerodynamicist)
- Predecessor: AlphaTauri AT01
- Successor: AlphaTauri AT03

Technical specifications
- Chassis: Carbon-fibre monocoque and Halo safety cockpit protection device
- Suspension (front): Scuderia AlphaTauri/Red Bull Technology carbon composite wishbones and upright assemblies with pushrod-operated inboard torsion bars and ZF Sachs dampers
- Suspension (rear): Red Bull Technology carbon composite wishbones with pullrod-operated inboard torsion bars and ZF Sachs dampers
- Length: 5,500 mm (217 in) including rear wing
- Width: 2,000 mm (79 in)
- Height: 950 mm (37 in)
- Wheelbase: 3,700 mm (146 in)
- Engine: Honda RA621H 1.6 L (98 cu in) direct injection (jointly developed and supplied by Honda and Hitachi Astemo) V6 turbocharged engine limited to 15,000 rpm in a mid-mounted, rear-wheel drive layout
- Electric motor: Honda kinetic and thermal energy recovery systems
- Transmission: Red Bull Technology sequential gearbox with eight forward and one reverse gears, longitudinally mounted with hydraulic system for power shift and clutch operation and limited-slip differential
- Weight: 743 kg (1,638 lb) (including driver, excluding fuel)
- Fuel: Esso Synergy
- Lubricants: Mobil 1
- Brakes: Brembo 6-piston aluminium-lithium calipers, Brembo carbon discs and carbon pads
- Tyres: Pirelli P Zero (dry); Pirelli Cinturato (wet)
- Clutch: ZF Sachs hydraulically-activated carbon multi-plate

Competition history
- Notable entrants: Scuderia AlphaTauri Honda
- Notable drivers: 10. (France) Pierre Gasly; 22. (Japan) Yuki Tsunoda
- Debut: 2021 Bahrain Grand Prix
- Last event: 2021 Abu Dhabi Grand Prix
Races	Wins	Podiums	Poles	F/Laps
22	0	1	0	1

The AlphaTauri AT02 is a Formula One racing car designed and constructed by Scuderia AlphaTauri to compete in the 2021 Formula 1 World Championship. The car was driven by F1 rookie Yuki Tsunoda and Pierre Gasly. The AT02 is the second car to be built and run under the AlphaTauri name.

== Season summary ==
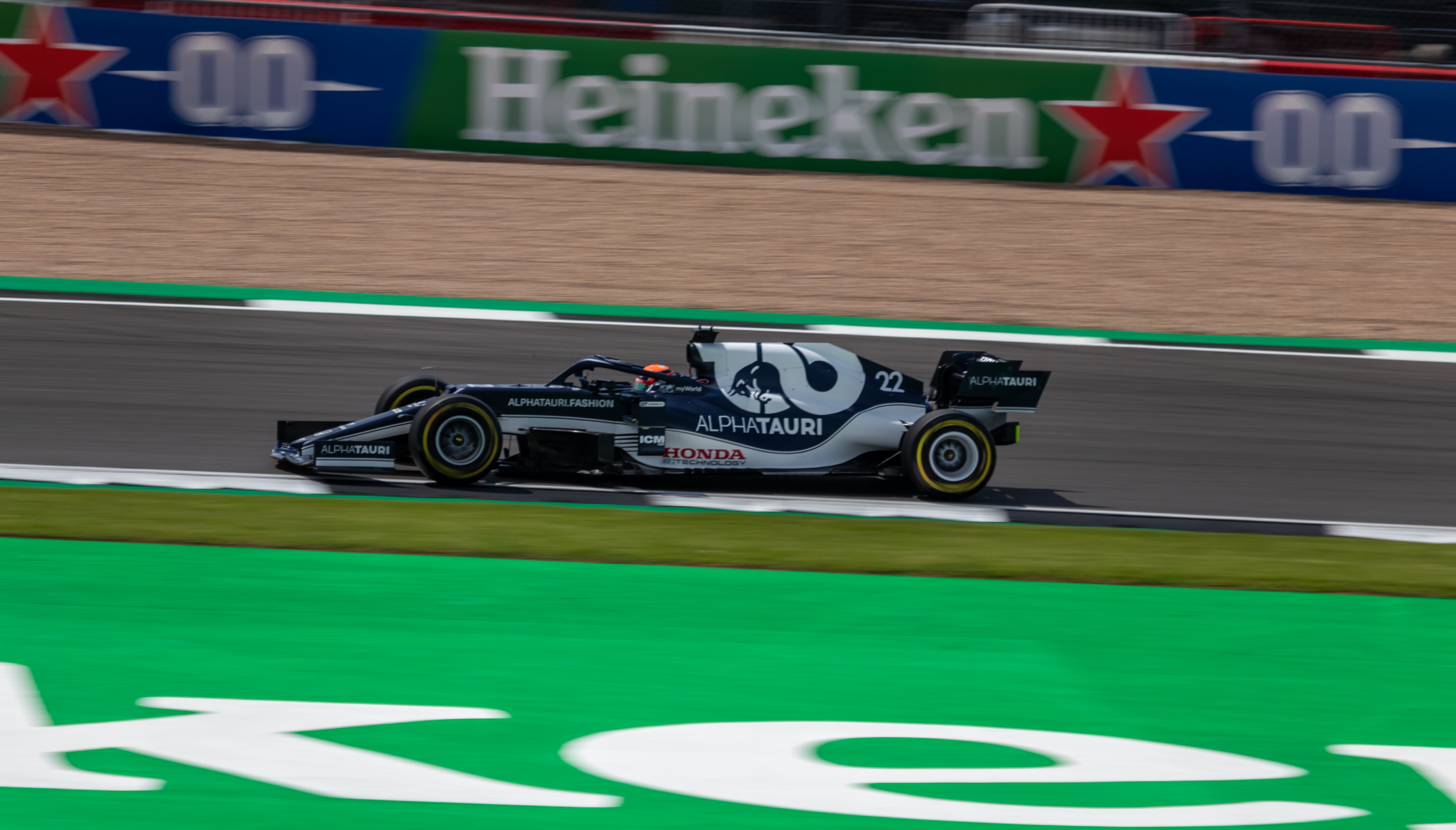
Yuki Tsunoda during the British Grand Prix

2021 confirmed AlphaTauri's position as a respectable midfield runner unable to make the final breakthrough needed to become a top team. The team's package was quick and reliable, but not quite enough to regularly score podiums. Indeed, Gasly and Tsunoda finished just outside the points, no less than two times. The highlight of the year was Gasly's run to third at the Azerbaijan Grand Prix to score the team's fifth podium since their F1 début in 1985 (as Minardi). This capped an encouraging season for the Frenchman, who was duly kept on for another year. Tsunoda, despite a points finish in the first race of the season, lost his motivation after a sequence of bad luck and narrowly missing out on further points until Abu Dhabi Grand Prix where Tsunoda finished fourth in his career.

The team finished sixth in the Constructors' Championship with 142 points, the cars best finish since entering the Formula 1 World Championship.

== Sponsorship and livery ==
The livery of the AT02 differs from that of its predecessor, the AT01: while retaining the white and dark blue color scheme, the blue is now a lighter shade and covers the entire upper section of the car including the nose and the wing while white now also features on the side bargeboards. The logo of engine supplier Honda also appears in new locations; it is no longer confined to the sidepods but is now also displayed on the rear wing, on both the front and rear faces.

For the Turkish Grand Prix, the two AT02 cars featured the inscription "ありがとう" (Japanese for "thank you") on their rear wings, replacing the usual Honda logo. This minor livery adjustment was intended to mark the conclusion of the technical partnership between the Italian team and the Japanese engine manufacturer, which would be leaving Formula 1 at the end of the season.

For the United States Grand Prix, the Honda engine supplier logos on the wing were replaced with those of Acura a brand used by Honda for the North American market.

== Complete Formula One results ==
(key)

Year	Entrant	Power unit	Tyres	Driver name	Grands Prix																						Points	WCC pos.
Year	Entrant	Power unit	Tyres	Driver name	BHR	EMI	POR	ESP	MON	AZE	FRA	STY	AUT	GBR	HUN	BEL^{‡}	NED	ITA	RUS	TUR	USA	MXC	SAP	QAT	SAU	ABU	Points	WCC pos.
2021	Scuderia AlphaTauri	Honda RA621H	P	(France) Pierre Gasly	17†	7	10	10	6	3	7	Ret	9	11	5^{F}	6	4	Ret	13	6	Ret	4	7	11	6	5	142	6th
2021	Scuderia AlphaTauri	Honda RA621H	P	(Japan) Yuki Tsunoda	9	12	15	Ret	16	7	13	10	12	10	6	15	Ret	DNS	17	14	9	Ret	15	13	14	4	142	6th

Notes

^{†} Driver failed to finish the race, but was classified as they had completed over 90% of the winner's race distance.
^{‡} Half points awarded as less than 75% of race distance completed.
