= AlphaTauri AT03 =

2022 Formula One race car

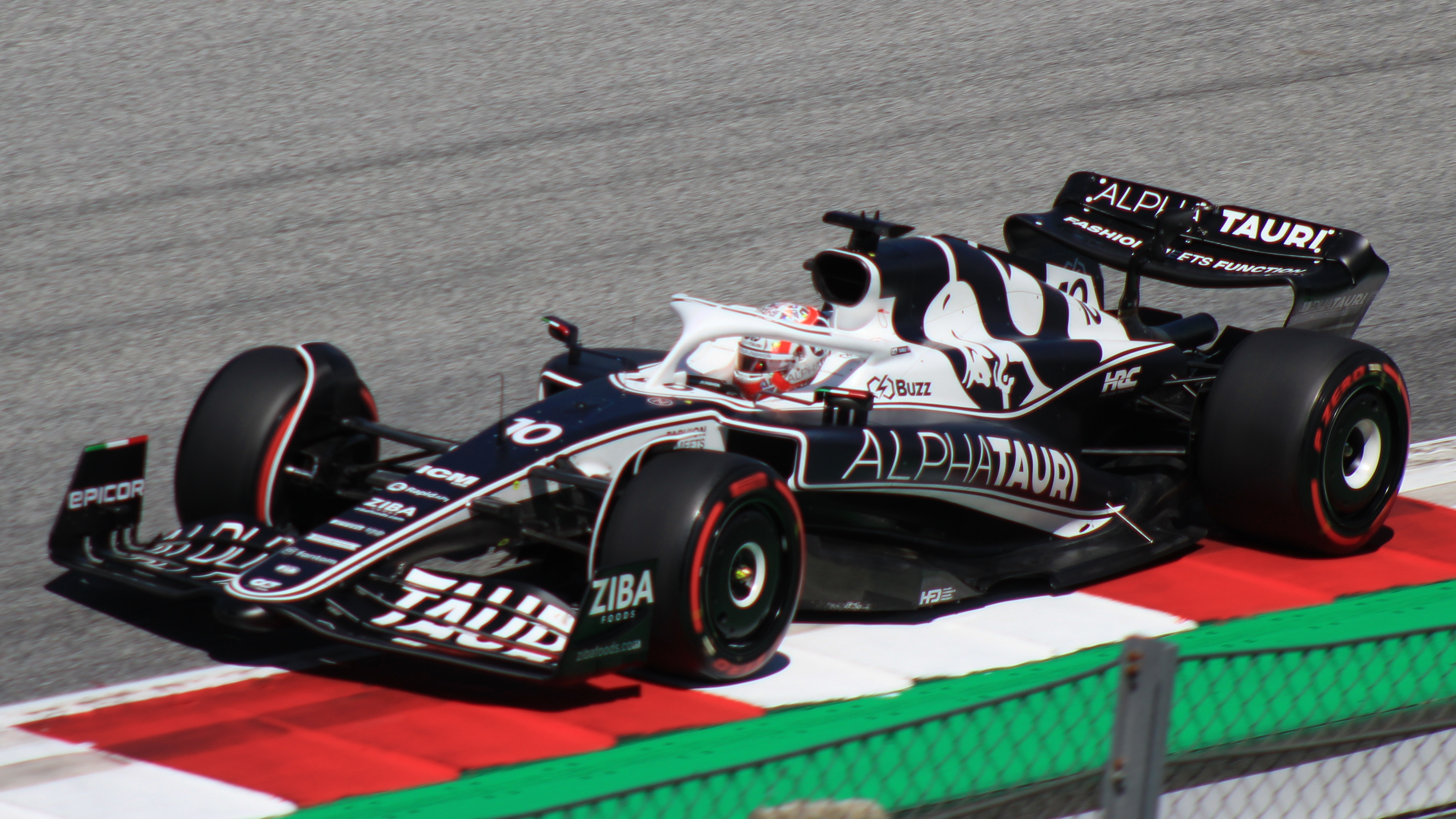
- Pierre Gasly driving the AlphaTauri AT03 during free practice at the Austrian Grand Prix
- Category: Formula One
- Constructor: AlphaTauri
- Designers: Jody Egginton (Technical Director); Paolo Marabini (Chief Designer – Composites and Structures); Trygve Rangen (Chief Designer – Mechanical and Systems); Guillaume Dezoteux (Head of Vehicle Performance); Claudio Balestri (Head of Vehicle Dynamics; Dickon Balmforth (Head of Aerodynamics); Peter Machin (Chief Aerodynamicist)
- Predecessor: AlphaTauri AT02
- Successor: AlphaTauri AT04

Technical specifications
- Chassis: Carbon-fibre monocoque and Halo safety cockpit protection device
- Suspension (front): Scuderia AlphaTauri/Red Bull Technology carbon composite wishbones and upright assemblies with pushrod-operated inboard torsion bars and dampers
- Suspension (rear): Red Bull Technology carbon composite wishbones with pushrod-operated inboard torsion bars and dampers
- Engine: Red Bull RBPTH001 1.6 L (98 cu in) direct injection (jointly developed and supplied by Honda and Hitachi) V6 turbocharged engine limited to 15,000 rpm in a mid-mounted, rear-wheel drive layout
- Electric motor: Red Bull Powertrains kinetic and thermal energy recovery systems
- Transmission: Red Bull Technology sequential gearbox with eight forward and one reverse gears, longitudinally mounted with hydraulic system for power shift and clutch operation and limited-slip differential
- Battery: Honda lithium-ion batteries
- Fuel: Esso Synergy
- Lubricants: Ravenol
- Brakes: Brembo 6-piston aluminium-lithium calipers, Brembo carbon discs and carbon pads
- Tyres: Pirelli P Zero (dry); Pirelli Cinturato (wet)
- Clutch: ZF Sachs hydraulically-activated carbon multi-plate

Competition history
- Notable entrants: Scuderia AlphaTauri
- Notable drivers: 10. (France) Pierre Gasly; 22. (Japan) Yuki Tsunoda
- Debut: 2022 Bahrain Grand Prix
- Last event: 2022 Abu Dhabi Grand Prix
Races	Wins	Podiums	Poles	F/Laps
22	0	0	0	0

The AlphaTauri AT03 is a Formula One car constructed by Scuderia AlphaTauri and racing in the 2022 Formula One World Championship. The car was driven by Pierre Gasly and Yuki Tsunoda. The AT03 is the third chassis built and designed by AlphaTauri and their first car under the 2022 technical regulations.

== Season summary ==
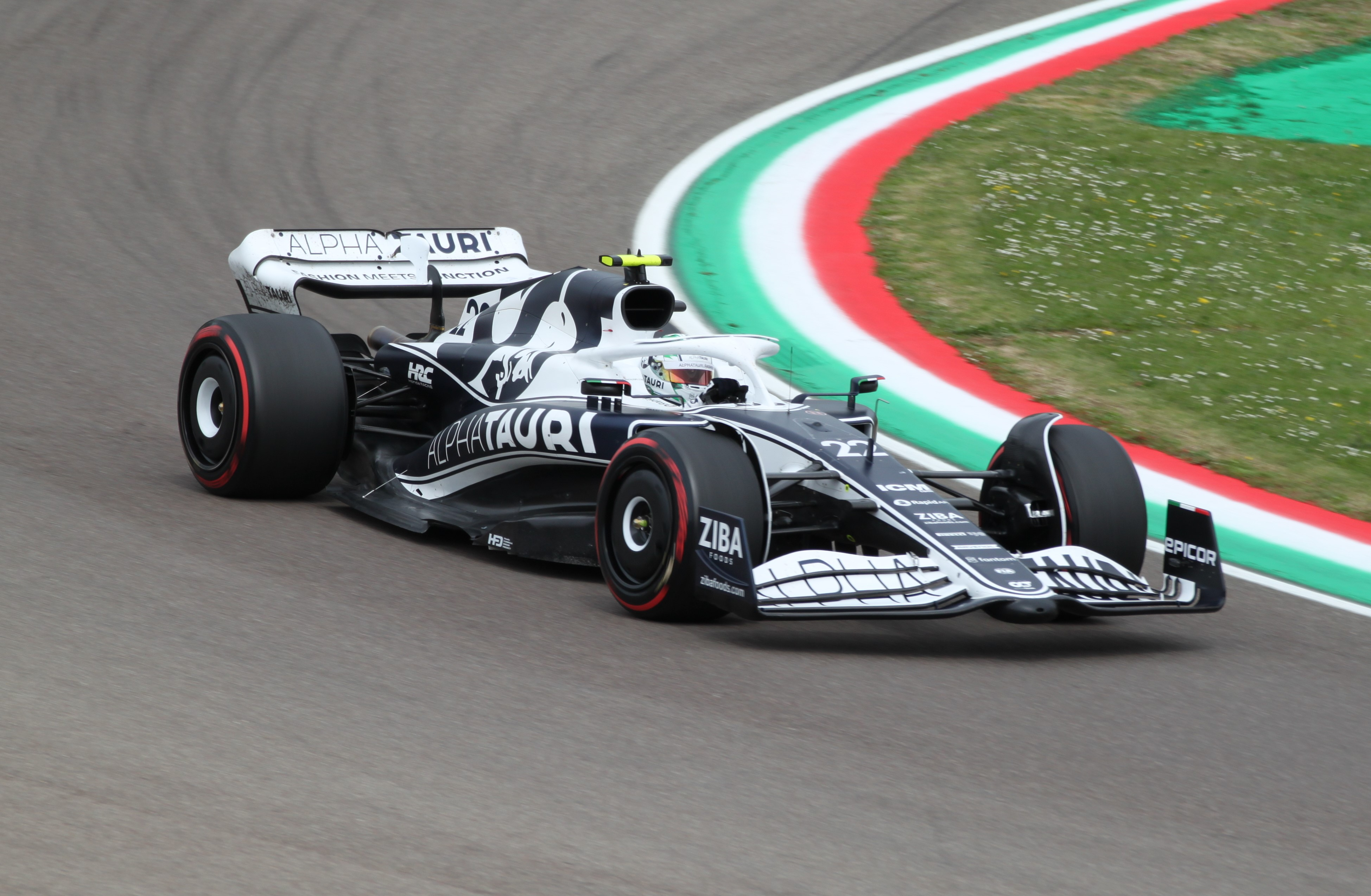
Tsunoda at the Emilia Romagna Grand Prix where he finished seventh

The car proved to be reasonably competitive initially, but not enough to escape from the large midfield group. As the season progressed however, the car gradually got worse. Gasly scored 23 points, but could not resist an offer from the fledgling Alpine team and left after the season finished, whilst Tsunoda endured his worst season to date, scoring just 12 points. The team finished in a lowly ninth in the Constructors' Championship – the same position as in 2018 (under Toro Rosso branding), but with more points.

== Sponsorship and livery ==
For the Miami Grand Prix, in honour of the first-ever race in Miami, the headrests of the two AT03 cars featured a design inspired by the livery of a show car created for the occasion by the artist Remote.

Starting from the Spanish Grand Prix, in an effort to reduce the car's weight, the paint was removed from the wings, leaving them in the black colour of the carbon fibre. The sponsor decals on these parts were all changed to white.

Starting from the Japanese Grand Prix, Honda logos reappeared on the engine cover, replacing the HRC ones.

== Complete Formula One results ==
Key

Key
Colour	Result
Gold	Winner
Silver	Second place
Bronze	Third place
Green	Other points position
Blue	Other classified position
Blue	Not classified, finished (NC)
Purple	Not classified, retired (Ret)
Red	Did not qualify (DNQ)
Black	Disqualified (DSQ)
White	Did not start (DNS)
White	Race cancelled (C)
Blank	Did not practice (DNP)
Blank	Excluded (EX)
Blank	Did not arrive (DNA)
Blank	Withdrawn (WD)
Blank	Did not enter (empty cell)
Annotation	Meaning
P	Pole position
F	Fastest lap
Superscript number	Points-scoring position in sprint

Year	Entrant	Power unit	Tyres	Driver name	Grands Prix																						Points	WCC pos.
Year	Entrant	Power unit	Tyres	Driver name	BHR	SAU	AUS	EMI	MIA	ESP	MON	AZE	CAN	GBR	AUT	FRA	HUN	BEL	NED	ITA	SIN	JPN	USA	MXC	SAP	ABU	Points	WCC pos.
2022	Scuderia AlphaTauri	Red Bull RBPTH001	P	(France) Pierre Gasly	Ret	8	9	12	Ret	13	11	5	14	Ret	15	12	12	9	11	8	10	18	14	11	14	14	35	9th
2022	Scuderia AlphaTauri	Red Bull RBPTH001	P	(Japan) Yuki Tsunoda	8	DNS	15	7	12	10	17	13	Ret	14	16	Ret	19	13	Ret	14	Ret	13	10	Ret	17	11	35	9th
