= AlphaTauri AT04 =

Formula One race car

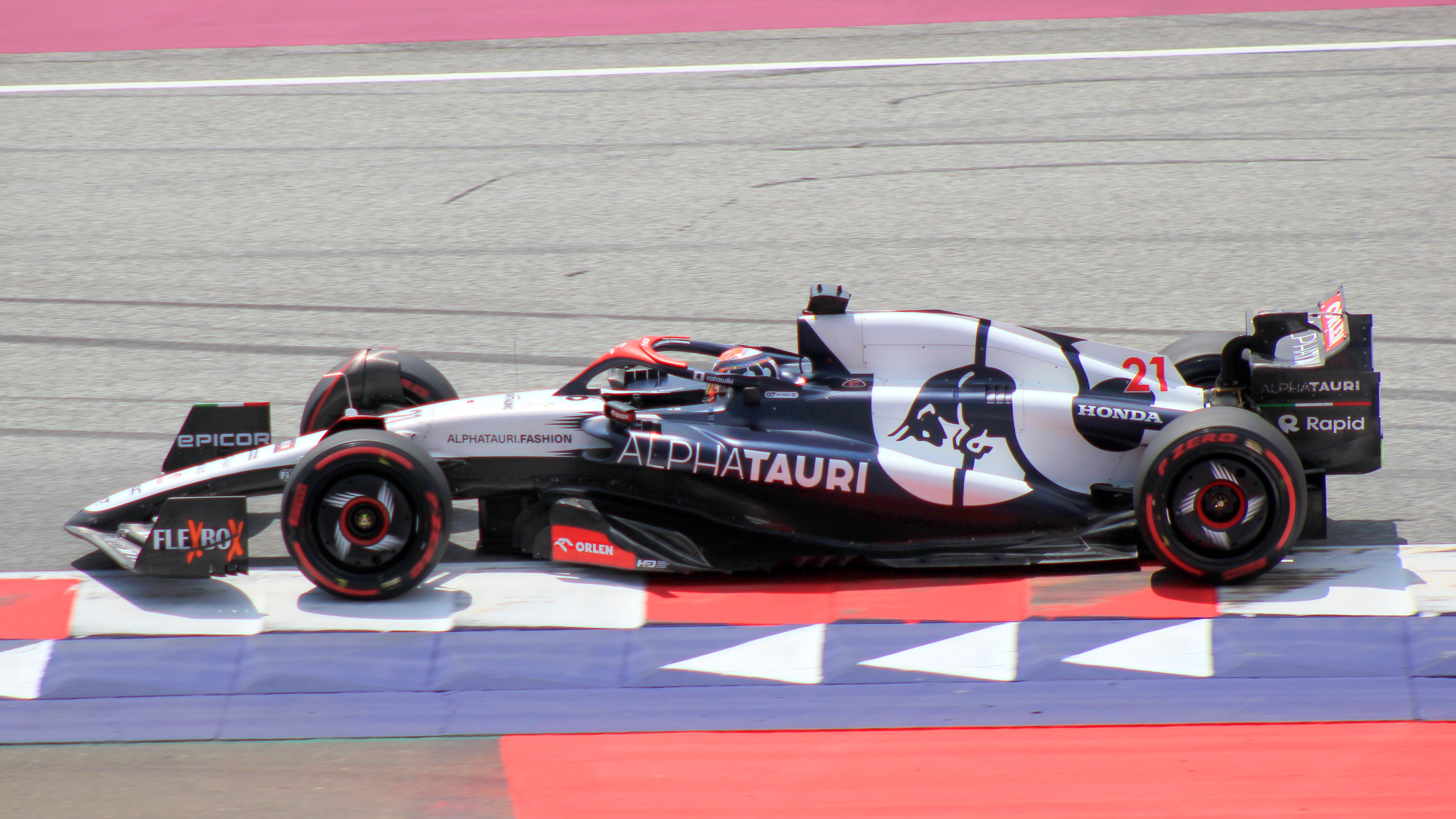
- Nyck de Vries driving an AT04 during the Austrian Grand Prix.
- Category: Formula One
- Constructor: AlphaTauri
- Designers: Jody Egginton (Technical Director); Paolo Marabini (Chief Designer – Composites and Structures); Trygve Rangen (Chief Designer – Mechanical and Systems); Phillip Eldred (Head of Concept Design; Guillaume Dezoteux (Head of Vehicle Performance); Claudio Balestri (Head of Vehicle Dynamics); Dickon Balmforth (Head of Aerodynamics); Peter Machin (Chief Aerodynamicist)
- Predecessor: AlphaTauri AT03
- Successor: RB VCARB 01

Technical specifications
- Chassis: Carbon-fibre monocoque and Halo safety cockpit protection device
- Suspension (front): Scuderia AlphaTauri/Red Bull Technology carbon composite wishbones and upright assemblies with pushrod-operated inboard torsion bars and dampers
- Suspension (rear): Red Bull Technology carbon composite wishbones with pushrod-operated inboard torsion bars and dampers
- Engine: Honda RBPTH001 1.6 L (98 cu in) direct injection (jointly developed and supplied by Honda and Hitachi Astemo) V6 turbocharged engine limited to 15,000 rpm in a mid-mounted, rear-wheel drive layout
- Electric motor: Honda kinetic and thermal energy recovery systems
- Transmission: Red Bull Technology sequential gearbox with eight forward and one reverse gears, longitudinally mounted with hydraulic system for power shift and clutch operation and limited-slip differential
- Fuel: Esso Synergy (Note: Orlen branding appeared on the AT04, but the car used ExxonMobil fuels)
- Lubricants: Ravenol
- Brakes: Brembo 6-piston aluminium-lithium calipers, Brembo carbon discs and carbon pads
- Tyres: Pirelli P Zero (dry); Pirelli Cinturato (wet)
- Clutch: Hydraulically-activated carbon multiplate

Competition history
- Notable entrants: Scuderia AlphaTauri
- Notable drivers: 3. (Australia) Daniel Ricciardo; 21. (Netherlands) Nyck de Vries; 22. (Japan) Yuki Tsunoda; 40. (New Zealand) Liam Lawson
- Debut: 2023 Bahrain Grand Prix
- Last event: 2023 Abu Dhabi Grand Prix
Races	Wins	Podiums	Poles	F/Laps
22	0	0	0	1

The AlphaTauri AT04 is a Formula One car constructed by Scuderia AlphaTauri for the 2023 Formula One World Championship. The car was driven by Nyck de Vries and Yuki Tsunoda up to the 2023 British Grand Prix, then Tsunoda and Daniel Ricciardo from the 2023 Hungarian Grand Prix onwards with Red Bull Racing and Scuderia AlphaTauri reserve driver Liam Lawson also driving the car from the 2023 Dutch Grand Prix to the 2023 Qatar Grand Prix after Ricciardo broke a bone in his hand in the second free practice session of the Dutch event requiring Lawson to replace him. The AT04 is the fourth and final chassis built and designed by AlphaTauri and was unveiled on 11 February 2023 in New York City. The car also marked the return of Honda as a named engine supplier to Red Bull Racing and AlphaTauri, with both teams' engines badged as Honda RBPT.

== Season summary ==
=== First 10 races ===
The AT04 appeared to be off the pace during testing and practice for the Bahrain Grand Prix with Yuki Tsunoda and Nyck de Vries qualifying 14th and 19th for the race respectively. de Vries finished 14th, whilst Tsunoda just missed out on the points with 11th place. At the Saudi Arabian Grand Prix de Vries and Tsunoda qualified 18th and 16th and finished the race 14th and 11th again respectively. The car got its first points of the season in Australia with Tsunoda being classified 10th after Carlos Sainz's penalty for colliding with Fernando Alonso at the lap 57 restart. de Vries however was taken out at the restart by fellow rookie Logan Sargeant. Tsunoda qualified 8th for the Azerbaijan Grand Prix whilst de Vries crashed before he could set a time during the session. The cars qualified at the back for the sprint race; during this race Tsunoda hit the wall receiving a puncture (after a collision with de Vries damaged his steering slightly) ending his chance for a good result and de Vries lacked pace all race. in the main race de Vries crashed at turn 5 on lap 10 ending his race whilst Tsunoda scored another point with 10th place moving AlphaTauri up to 9th in the Constructors' Championship.

The next 2 races would consist of 18th for de Vries and 11th for Tsunoda in Miami and 12th and 15th for de Vries and Tsunoda respectively in Monaco. At the next race in Spain de Vries would qualify 14th and Tsunoda qualified 15th. During the race de Vries would finish 14th whilst Tsunoda finished 9th but lost the points due to a time penalty for forcing Zhou Guanyu off track late in the race (he was classified 12th). Both cars were eliminated in Q1 in Canada, Tsunoda finished 14th and de Vries finished 18th and last of the runners. Due to Alex Albon's 7th-place finish, the team fell back to last in the Constructors' Championship.

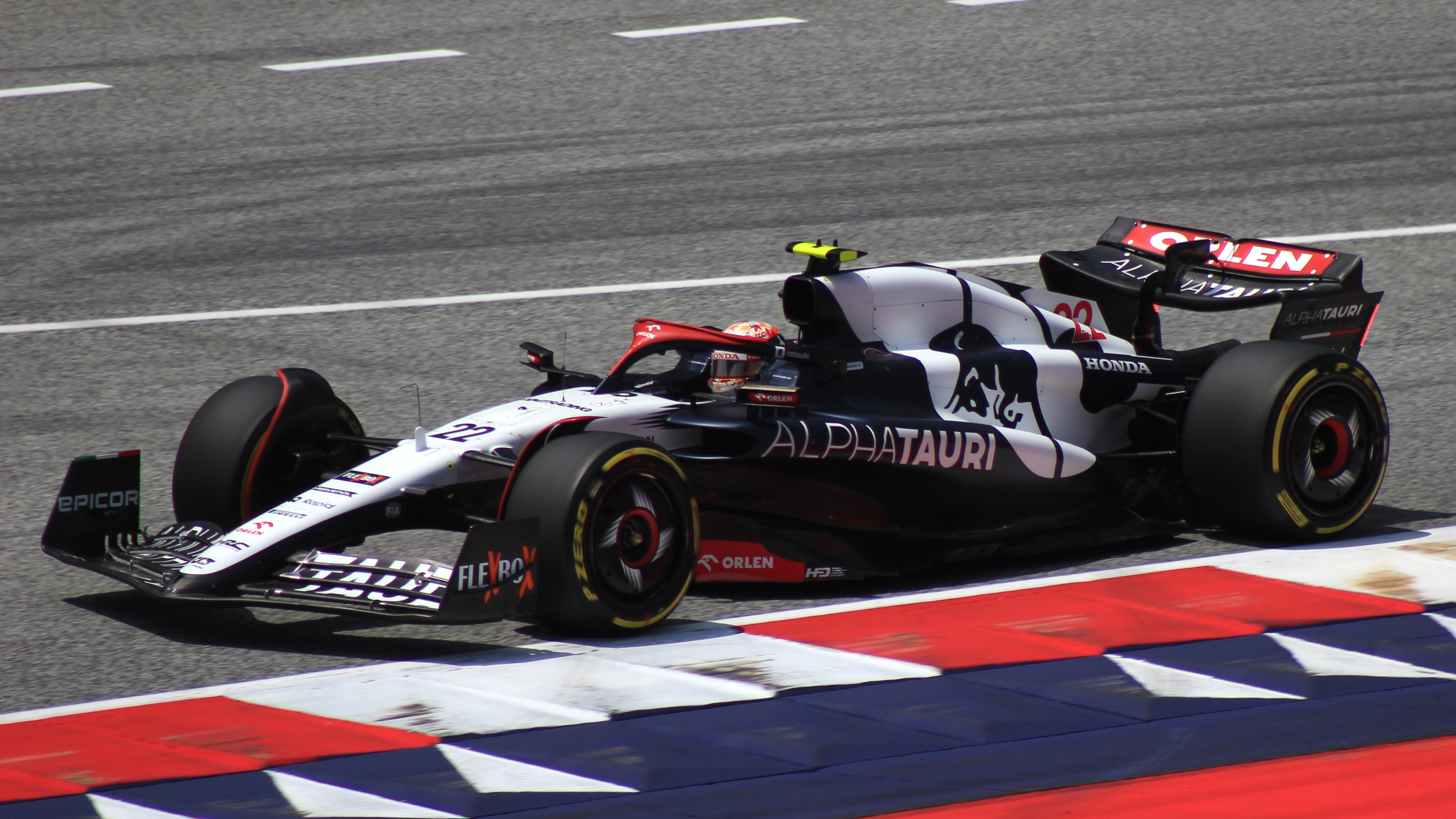
Tsunoda at the Austrian Grand Prix

Both drivers were eliminated in Q1 at the Austrian Grand Prix and both were eliminated in SQ2 and Tsunoda and de Vries finished 16th and 17th in the sprint respectively. In the main race both drivers got a large amounts of penalties for track limits with Tsunoda getting 15 seconds worth of penalties and de Vries also receiving a 15 second time penalty for track limits and a 5 second time penalty for forcing Kevin Magnussen off track during the race leading to 17th place for De Vries and 19th place for Tsunoda. Tsunoda qualified 16th and De Vries qualified 18th for the British Grand Prix, the race wouldn't go any better as the Tsunoda and De Vries finished 16th and 17th respectively.

After the first 10 races AlphaTauri were 10th in the Constructors' Championship with 2 points all scored by Tsunoda who was 17th in the Drivers' Championship whilst de Vries sat 20th and last having scored no points during the 10 races he had competed in.

=== Hungary and Belgium: a driver change and a return to points ===
Due to his poor results and failure to score during the first 10 races De Vries was dismissed by the team. Daniel Ricciardo who had raced for the team when it was known as Toro Rosso in 2012 and 2013 was chosen to replace de Vries for the rest of the season. The change came ahead of the Hungarian Grand Prix. Ricciardo on his return to F1 qualified 13th whilst Tsunoda qualified 17th. In the race Riccardo was rear ended by Zhou Guanyu causing him to smash into Esteban Ocon leading to a multi car collision. Despite the incident which left him in last place Ricciardo finished 13th beating Tsunoda who finished 15th.

Tsunoda qualified 11th for the Belgian Grand Prix whilst Ricciardo qualified 19th after having his lap deleted for track limits. Sprint qualifying was a reverse of fortunes as Riccardo qualified 11th whilst Tsunoda qualified 16th. Tsunoda finished the sprint 18th whilst Riccardo just missed out on points in 10th place. In the race Ricciardo had a disappointing day finishing 16th whilst Tsunoda finished 10th scoring the AT04's first points since the Azerbaijan Grand Prix in April. AlphaTauri ended the first half of the season 10th in the Constructors' Championship with three points.

=== Netherlands to Qatar: another driver change and results improve ===
At the Dutch Grand Prix Ricciardo suffered a crash during FP2 trying to avoid Oscar Piastri's crashed car at turn 3. During the accident the steering wheel of his car snapped on his hand with Ricciardo in pain when he got out the car forcing Ricciardo to go to the medical centre. Later the medical centre tests showed Ricciardo had broken a metacarpal bone in his hand forcing him to miss the next few races. Liam Lawson was chosen to replace Ricciardo until he was fit to return.

Lawson qualified 20th and last for his debut qualifying. Tsunoda qualified 14th. During the race Lawson had a wheel-to-wheel battle with Ferrari's Charles Leclerc and also overtook Max Verstappen to unlap himself. Tsunoda during the race had contact with George Russell earning a penalty dropping him to 15th whilst Lawson finished his first race 13th place.

At the team's home grand prix at Monza Tsunoda qualified 11th and Lawson 12th, however Tsunoda didn't start the race due to an engine failure on the formation lap; the second time he failed to start the race at Monza. Lawson however in his second race just missed out on the points in 11th-place finishing, 6 seconds behind 10th-place finisher Valtteri Bottas.

Tsunoda qualified 15th for the Singapore Grand Prix whilst Lawson qualified 10th, most notably knocking championship leader and Red Bull driver Max Verstappen out of qualifying which meant neither Red Bull car made Q3 for the first time since the 2018 Russian Grand Prix. Tsunoda got taken out on lap one of the race by Sergio Pérez whilst Lawson scored his first points by finishing 9th which was the team's highest finish at that point of the season.

Ahead of the Japanese Grand Prix the team announced that Ricciardo and Tsunoda would drive for the team in 2024, with Lawson being the team's reserve driver.

Tsunoda qualified 9th for his home Grand Prix in Japan with Lawson qualifying 11th. Lawson finished the race 11th ahead of Tsunoda who finished 12th. Lawson qualified 18th for the Qatar Grand Prix whilst Tsunoda qualified 11th. Lawson qualified 14th and Tsunoda qualified 18th for the sprint. Lawson spun out of the sprint on lap 1 and Tsunoda finished 11th. Tsunoda finished 15th whilst Lawson finished 17th and last of the runners during the main race. AlphaTauri ended these 5 races last in the Constructors' Championship with 5 points.

=== Closing rounds: USA to Abu Dhabi ===
Ricciardo returned to the team for the United States Grand Prix so Lawson went back to his reserve driver role. Ricciardo qualified 15th with Tsunoda qualifying 11th for the race. In sprint qualifying Ricciardo qualified 11th and Tsunoda qualified 19th. The sprint saw Ricciardo end up 12th and Tsunoda end up 14th. in the main race Ricciardo struggled to 15th place but Tsunoda finished 10th with the fastest lap securing two points. Tsunoda then would be promoted to eighth place after Lewis Hamilton and Charles Leclerc were disqualified for their skid blocks being worn, the three extra points allowed AlphaTauri to close up to Haas and Alfa Romeo in the fight for 8th in the Constructors' Championship as they sat one point behind their rivals.

Ricciardo qualified 4th for the Mexico City Grand Prix whilst Tsunoda qualified 15th. During the race, Tsunoda benefitted from the red flag caused by Kevin Magnussen's crash to move into the top 10 but made a mistake trying to pass Oscar Piastri, spinning off at turn 1 and throwing away an 8th-place finish, Ricciardo finished 7th marking the team's best finish of the season. The result moved the team up into 8th in the Constructors' Championship, leaping ahead of Haas and drawing level on points with Alfa Romeo. During FP1 to fulfill the regulations of a rookie driver having experience of driving an F1 car, F2 driver and Red Bull junior Isack Hadjar took Tsunoda's place for the session where he finished 17th fastest, second highest of the rookies driving in the session.

The team had a poor qualifying session for the final sprint weekend at São Paulo qualifying 16th and 17th. Both cars made Q3 for the sprint with Tsunoda finishing 6th after a brilliant overtake on the Mercedes of Lewis Hamilton whilst Ricciardo finished 9th. During the race Ricciardo's rear wing was damaged in a start line crashing involving Alex Albon, Kevin Magnussen, Oscar Piastri and himself. Ricciardo despite being able to stay in the race had no pace due to the damage finishing a lap down on the field. Meanwhile, Tsunoda finished 9th securing two more points. This allowed the team to extend their lead over Alfa Romeo in the fight for 8th in the Constructors' Championship and close up to 7th placed Williams sitting 7 points behind the Grove outfit. The drivers had a poor weekend at the first ever Las Vegas Grand Prix qualifying 20th and 15th, Ricciardo finished 15th and Tsunoda retired with gearbox problems. Ricciardo qualified 15th whilst Tsunoda qualified 6th for the season finale in Abu Dhabi. The team needed a minimum of 6th place to take 7th in the Constructors' Championship off Williams. Riccardo had a hard race finishing 11th whilst Tsunoda led the race for three laps but his one stop strategy failed to work and he just about held off Lewis Hamilton for 8th place in the race which secured AlphaTauri 8th in the Constructors' Championship in their last season in F1.

AlphaTauri finished 2023 8th in the Constructors' Championship with 25 points. Tsunoda finished 14th in the Drivers' Championship with 17 points, Ricciardo was 17th with 6 points, Lawson finished 20th with 2 points and Nyck de Vries came 22nd with 0 points.

== Complete Formula One results ==
Key

Key
Colour	Result
Gold	Winner
Silver	Second place
Bronze	Third place
Green	Other points position
Blue	Other classified position
Blue	Not classified, finished (NC)
Purple	Not classified, retired (Ret)
Red	Did not qualify (DNQ)
Black	Disqualified (DSQ)
White	Did not start (DNS)
White	Race cancelled (C)
Blank	Did not practice (DNP)
Blank	Excluded (EX)
Blank	Did not arrive (DNA)
Blank	Withdrawn (WD)
Blank	Did not enter (empty cell)
Annotation	Meaning
P	Pole position
F	Fastest lap
Superscript number	Points-scoring position in sprint

Year	Entrant	Power unit	Tyres	Driver name	Grands Prix																						Points	WCC pos.
Year	Entrant	Power unit	Tyres	Driver name	BHR	SAU	AUS	AZE	MIA	MON	ESP	CAN	AUT	GBR	HUN	BEL	NED	ITA	SIN	JPN	QAT	USA	MXC	SAP	LVG	ABU	Points	WCC pos.
2023	Scuderia AlphaTauri	Honda RBPTH001	P	(Japan) Yuki Tsunoda	11	11	10	10	11	15	12	14	19	16	15	10	15	DNS	Ret	12	15	8^{F}	12	9^{6}	18†	8	25	8th
2023	Scuderia AlphaTauri	Honda RBPTH001	P	(Netherlands) Nyck de Vries	14	14	15†	Ret	18	12	14	18	17	17													25	8th
2023	Scuderia AlphaTauri	Honda RBPTH001	P	(Australia) Daniel Ricciardo											13	16	WD					15	7	13	14	11	25	8th
2023	Scuderia AlphaTauri	Honda RBPTH001	P	(New Zealand) Liam Lawson													13	11	9	11	17						25	8th
