= Racing Bulls VCARB 02 =

2025 Formula One car

- Liam Lawson driving the VCARB 02 during the Austrian Grand Prix
- Category: Formula One
- Constructor: Racing Bulls
- Designers: Tim Goss (Chief Technical Officer); Jody Egginton (Technical Director); Guillaume Cattelani (Deputy Technical Director - Performance); Andrea Landi (Deputy Technical Director - Car Design); Paolo Marabini (Chief Designer); Guillaume Dezoteux (Head of Vehicle Performance); Guru Johl (Head of Aerodynamics); Pete Machin (Chief Aerodynamicist)
- Predecessor: RB VCARB 01
- Successor: Racing Bulls VCARB 03

Technical specifications
- Chassis: Carbon-fibre monocoque and Halo safety cockpit protection device
- Suspension (front): Multi-link pull-rod actuated dampers and anti-roll bar
- Suspension (rear): Double wishbone push-rod springs, dampers, and anti-roll bar
- Engine: Honda RBPTH003 1.6 L (98 cu in) direct injection (jointly developed and supplied by Honda and Hitachi Astemo) V6 turbocharged engine limited to 15,000 rpm in a rear mid-mounted, rear-wheel-drive layout
- Electric motor: Honda Kinetic and thermal energy recovery systems
- Transmission: Red Bull Technology 8 plus 1 reverse
- Battery: Honda-Lithium-ion-battery
- Power: 1080hp (805kW)
- Weight: 800 kg (including driver, excluding fuel)
- Fuel: Esso / Mobil Synergy
- Lubricants: Mobil 1
- Brakes: Brembo 6-piston aluminium-lithium calipers, Brembo carbon discs and carbon pads
- Tyres: Pirelli P Zero (Dry); Pirelli Cinturato (Wet)
- Clutch: Hydraulically-activated carbon multiplate

Competition history
- Notable entrants: Visa Cash App Racing Bulls F1 Team
- Notable drivers: 6. (France) Isack Hadjar; 22. (Japan) Yuki Tsunoda; 30. (New Zealand) Liam Lawson
- Debut: 2025 Australian Grand Prix
- Last event: 2025 Abu Dhabi Grand Prix
Races	Wins	Podiums	Poles	F/Laps
24	0	1	0	0

The Racing Bulls VCARB 02 is a Formula One car constructed by Racing Bulls that competed in the 2025 Formula One World Championship. The car was driven by Yuki Tsunoda and Isack Hadjar, with Liam Lawson (who drove 11 races for the team in 2023 and 2024) later returning to replace Tsunoda from the 2025 Japanese Grand Prix after being demoted from the main Red Bull outfit after the first two rounds of the 2025 season (the Australian Grand Prix and the Chinese Grand Prix). The VCARB 02, which is powered by the Honda RBPTH003 power unit, is the last Racing Bulls car to be powered by Honda RBPT-badged engines; from the 2026 season, Racing Bulls and its sister team Red Bull Racing will utilise Red Bull Powertrains engines.

== Background ==
=== Design and technical ===
Technically, the VCARB 02 was slightly improved compared to its predecessor with a new body design, sidepods, ground effect and a boxy airbox shape design. Other parts are visually not interchangeable.

=== Livery ===
The livery was unveiled on 18 February 2025 during the F1 75 Live event at The O2 Arena along with the other teams. Compared to the previous season, the livery was drastically changed into a solid white paint with a smaller blue charging bull patterns on the rear of the car. The livery was positively received as it was voted by fans as "a fan favourite livery" and mimicking the 2021 White Bull livery used on the Red Bull RB16B at the 2021 Turkish Grand Prix.

In Miami, the cars ran in a special livery inspired by the Red Bull Summer Edition white peach flavour, with the wheel covers representing the top of the can. A graffiti livery was used during the British Grand Prix, and a "chameleon" livery designed to promote Visa's Chameleon Card was run for the United States Grand Prix.

== Competition history ==
Isack Hadjar finished third at the Dutch Grand Prix, scoring his first podium in Formula One. This was the team's first overall podium finish since the 2021 Azerbaijan Grand Prix, when they were known as Scuderia AlphaTauri.

== Complete Formula One results ==
Key

Key
Colour	Result
Gold	Winner
Silver	Second place
Bronze	Third place
Green	Other points position
Blue	Other classified position
Blue	Not classified, finished (NC)
Purple	Not classified, retired (Ret)
Red	Did not qualify (DNQ)
Black	Disqualified (DSQ)
White	Did not start (DNS)
White	Race cancelled (C)
Blank	Did not practice (DNP)
Blank	Excluded (EX)
Blank	Did not arrive (DNA)
Blank	Withdrawn (WD)
Blank	Did not enter (empty cell)
Annotation	Meaning
P	Pole position
F	Fastest lap
Superscript number	Points-scoring position in sprint

Year	Entrant	Power unit	Tyres	Driver name	Grands Prix																								Points	WCC pos.
Year	Entrant	Power unit	Tyres	Driver name	AUS	CHN	JPN	BHR	SAU	MIA	EMI	MON	ESP	CAN	AUT	GBR	BEL	HUN	NED	ITA	AZE	SIN	USA	MXC	SAP	LVG	QAT	ABU	Points	WCC pos.
2025	Visa Cash App Racing Bulls F1 Team	Honda RBPTH003	P	(France) Isack Hadjar	DNS	11	8	13	10	11	9	6	7	16	12	Ret	20^{8}	11	3	10	10	11	16	13	8	6	18†	17	92	6th
2025	Visa Cash App Racing Bulls F1 Team	Honda RBPTH003	P	(Japan) Yuki Tsunoda	12	16^{6}																							92	6th
2025	Visa Cash App Racing Bulls F1 Team	Honda RBPTH003	P	(New Zealand) Liam Lawson			17	16	12	Ret	14	8	11	Ret	6	Ret	8	8	12	14	5	15	11	Ret	7	14	9	18	92	6th
