= Scuderia Toro Rosso STR14 =

2019 Formula One racing car

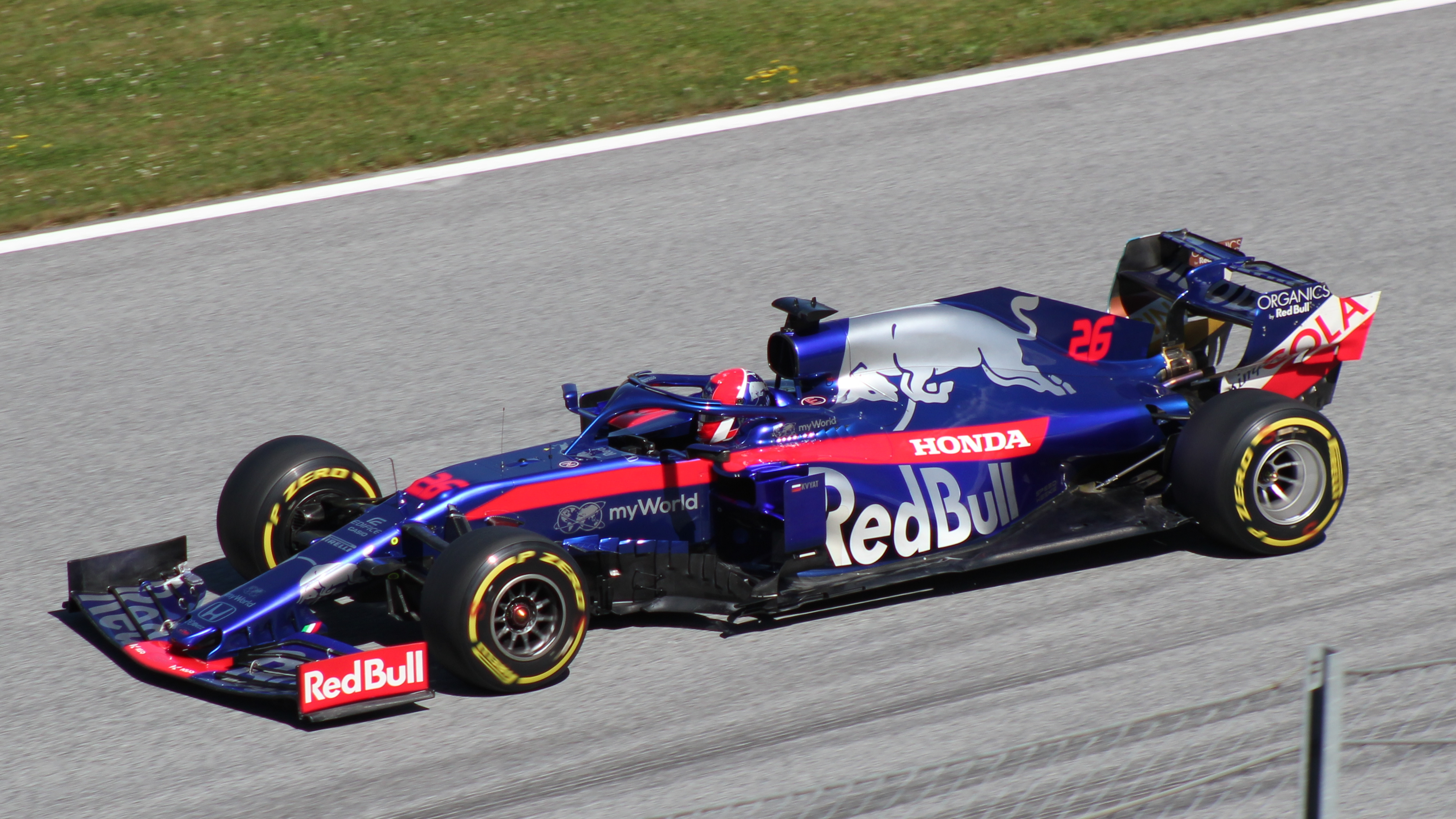
- Daniil Kvyat driving the STR14 during the Austrian Grand Prix
- Category: Formula One
- Constructor: Scuderia Toro Rosso
- Designers: James Key (Technical Director); Jody Egginton (Deputy Technical Director); Paolo Marabini (Chief Designer – Composites and Structures); Trygve Rangen (Chief Designer – Mechanical and Systems); Phil Arnaboldi (Chief Designer – Concept Design); Guillaume Dezoteux (Head of Vehicle Performance); Claudio Balestri (Head of Vehicle Dynamics); Dickon Balmforth (Head of Aerodynamics); Ben Mallock (Deputy Head of Aerodynamics)
- Predecessor: Scuderia Toro Rosso STR13
- Successor: AlphaTauri AT01

Technical specifications
- Chassis: Carbon-fibre monocoque with honeycomb structure and Halo safety cockpit protection
- Suspension (front): Scuderia Toro Rosso/Red Bull Technology Carbon Composite wishbones with pushrod operated inboard torsion bar and ZF Sachs dampers
- Suspension (rear): Red Bull Technology Carbon Composite wishbones with Pullrod operated inboard torsion bar and ZF Sachs dampers
- Length: 5,500 mm (217 in) including rear wing
- Width: 2,000 mm (79 in)
- Height: 950 mm (37 in)
- Wheelbase: 3,700 mm (146 in)
- Engine: Honda RA619H 1.6 L (98 cu in) direct injection (jointly developed and supplied by Honda and Hitachi) V6 turbocharged engine limited to 15,000 rpm in a mid-mounted, rear-wheel drive layout
- Electric motor: Honda kinetic and thermal energy recovery systems
- Transmission: Red Bull Technology 8-speed sequential semi-automatic, longitudinally mounted with hydraulic system for power shift and clutch operation + 1 reverse
- Battery: Honda Racing F1 lithium-ion battery
- Weight: 743 kg (1,638 lb) including driver
- Fuel: Esso Synergy
- Lubricants: Mobil 1
- Brakes: Brembo brake-by-wire system with 6-piston calipers, carbon discs and pads
- Tyres: Pirelli P Zero (dry); Pirelli Cinturato (wet); O.Z. Racing forged magnesium wheels: 13"
- Clutch: ZF Sachs hydraulically-activated carbon multi-plate

Competition history
- Notable entrants: Red Bull Toro Rosso Honda
- Notable drivers: 10. (France) Pierre Gasly; 23. (Thailand) Alexander Albon; 26. (Russia) Daniil Kvyat
- Debut: 2019 Australian Grand Prix
- Last event: 2019 Abu Dhabi Grand Prix
Races	Wins	Podiums	Poles	F/Laps
21	0	2	0	0

The Scuderia Toro Rosso STR14 is a Formula One racing car designed and constructed by Scuderia Toro Rosso to compete in the 2019 FIA Formula One World Championship. The car made its debut at the 2019 Australian Grand Prix.

The car was initially driven by Daniil Kvyat, and F1 debutant Alexander Albon. In August 2019, in between the Hungarian and Belgian Grands Prix, it was announced that Albon would be promoted to Red Bull Racing for the remainder of the season, while Pierre Gasly would return to Toro Rosso, due to the poor performance of the Frenchman at the senior team Red Bull Racing. In addition to this Naoki Yamamoto drove during the first practice session of the Japanese Grand Prix.

The car is the second Toro Rosso car to be powered by a Honda engine, and is the first Toro Rosso car to score a podium finish since the Toro Rosso STR3 of 2008, with two podium finishes, scored by Daniil Kvyat in Germany, and Pierre Gasly in Brazil. The STR14 ended the 2019 season in 6th place in the constructor standings with 85 points, achieving their highest championship position since finishing 6th in 2008, and while also scoring the highest number of points in a single season in the team's history. Owing to the team's rebranding to Scuderia AlphaTauri after the 2019 season, the STR14 was the last car produced by the Faenza-based team to bear the Toro Rosso name.

== Design and development ==
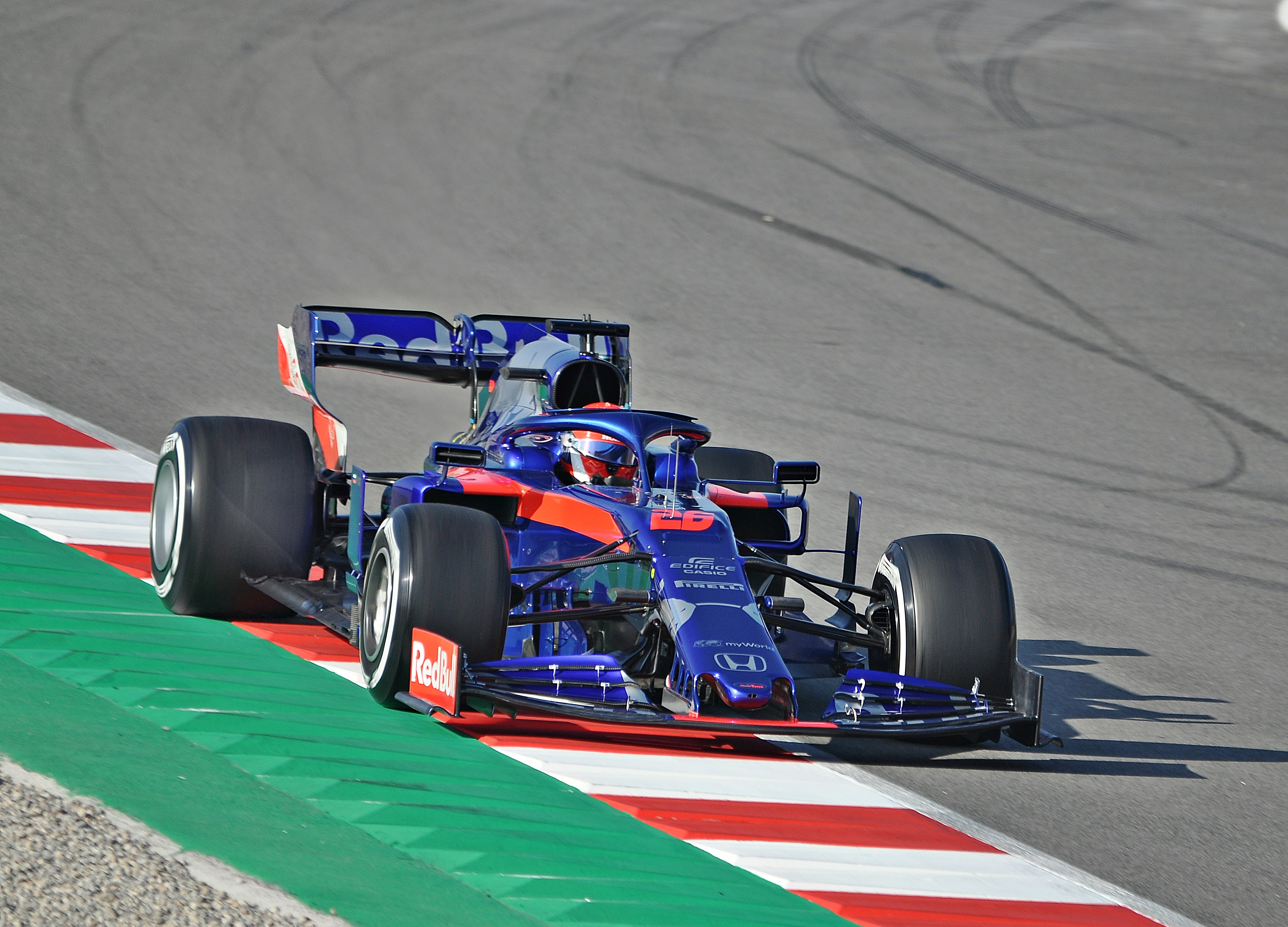
Kvyat during pre-season testing in Barcelona

The car was launched online, on 11 February 2019. This was the last car to be designed by the outgoing Technical Director of the team, James Key, ahead of his departure to McLaren. The car features a number of shared components with the Red Bull RB15, with the full rear end, including the rear suspension, as well as a number of front suspension components coming from the senior team's car. It had its shakedown completed at the Misano World Circuit Marco Simoncelli, with Daniil Kvyat, and Alexander Albon at the wheel, ahead of pre-season testing, on 13 February 2019.

The online launch specifications appeared to be for a greatly simplified version of the previous year's car, most notably at its front. However, significant changes were observed throughout the remainder of the car. The nose appeared to be the 2018 specification carried from its predecessor due to several cues, such as the thumb tip, louvered mounting pylons and the S-Duct. The monocoque of the car saw the sloped front section become more pronounced, due to the added hump formed over the front suspension rockers, similar to that on the Force India VJM11. The wishbones of the front suspension were lowered compared to the Toro Rosso chassis used for the previous two seasons; previously they had been raised due to aerodynamic reasons. Compared to the rest of the car, the sidepods saw the most number of changes, with the team switching from a conventional sidepod design to a new high-top design that had first been seen on the Ferrari SF70H, before appearing on a number of other cars on the grid.

== Competition history ==
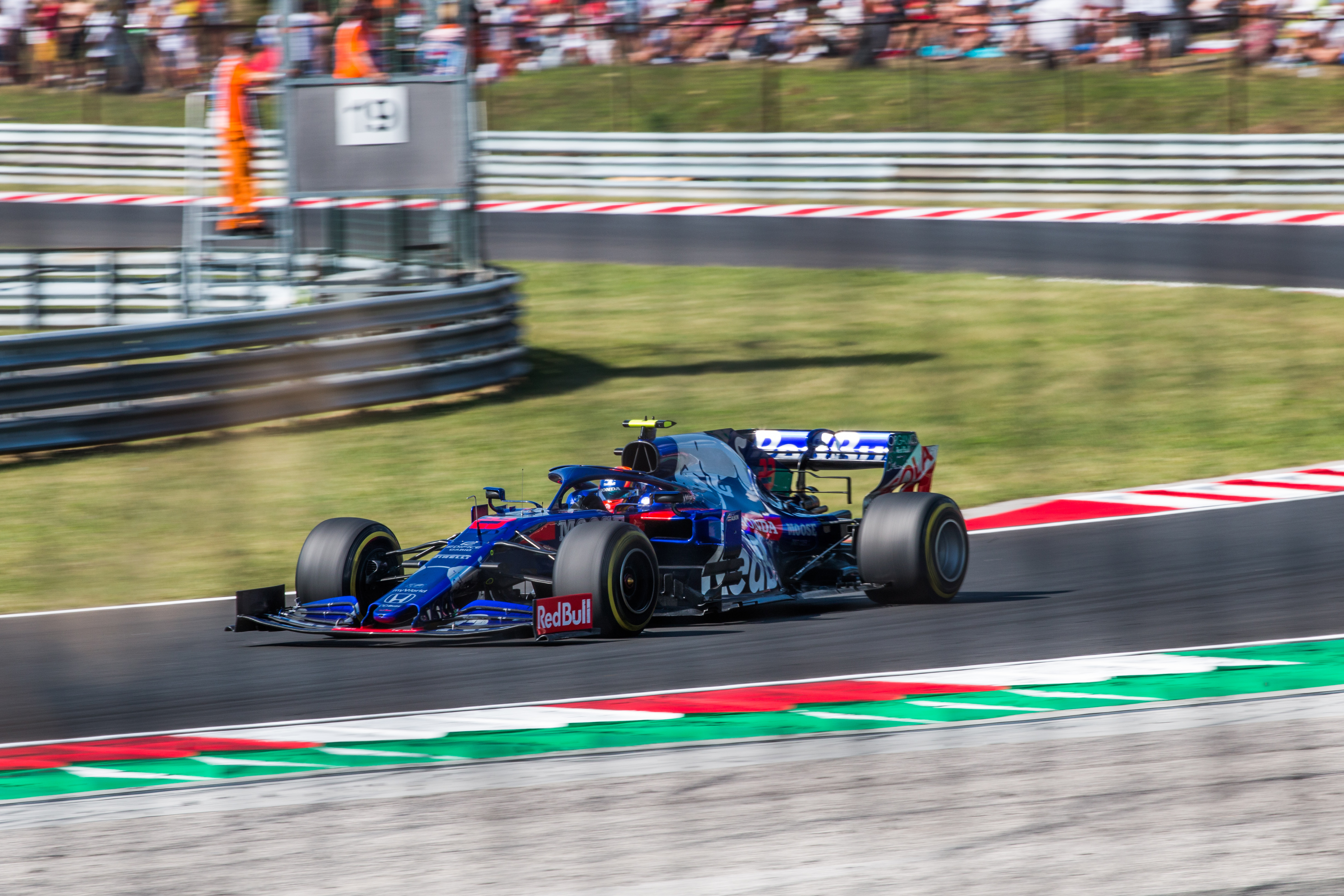
Albon driving the STR14 at the Hungarian Grand Prix; his last race with Toro Rosso before moving to Red Bull after the summer break

The car has proven to be more competitive compared to its predecessor, with the car showing much one-lap pace, in Qualifying on Saturday, with the drivers reaching Q3 regularly. The car would receive its first engine upgrade of the year at the power demanding Baku City Circuit, where the Azerbaijan Grand Prix was held, with the upgrade focusing on improving the reliability, as well as power improvements. The team would score its first double points finish for the car at the Monaco Grand Prix, with Kvyat in P7 and Albon in P8. At the chaotic German Grand Prix, Kvyat scored a shock podium for the team, in what was the team's first podium finish since 2008, when Sebastian Vettel won the 2008 Italian Grand Prix.

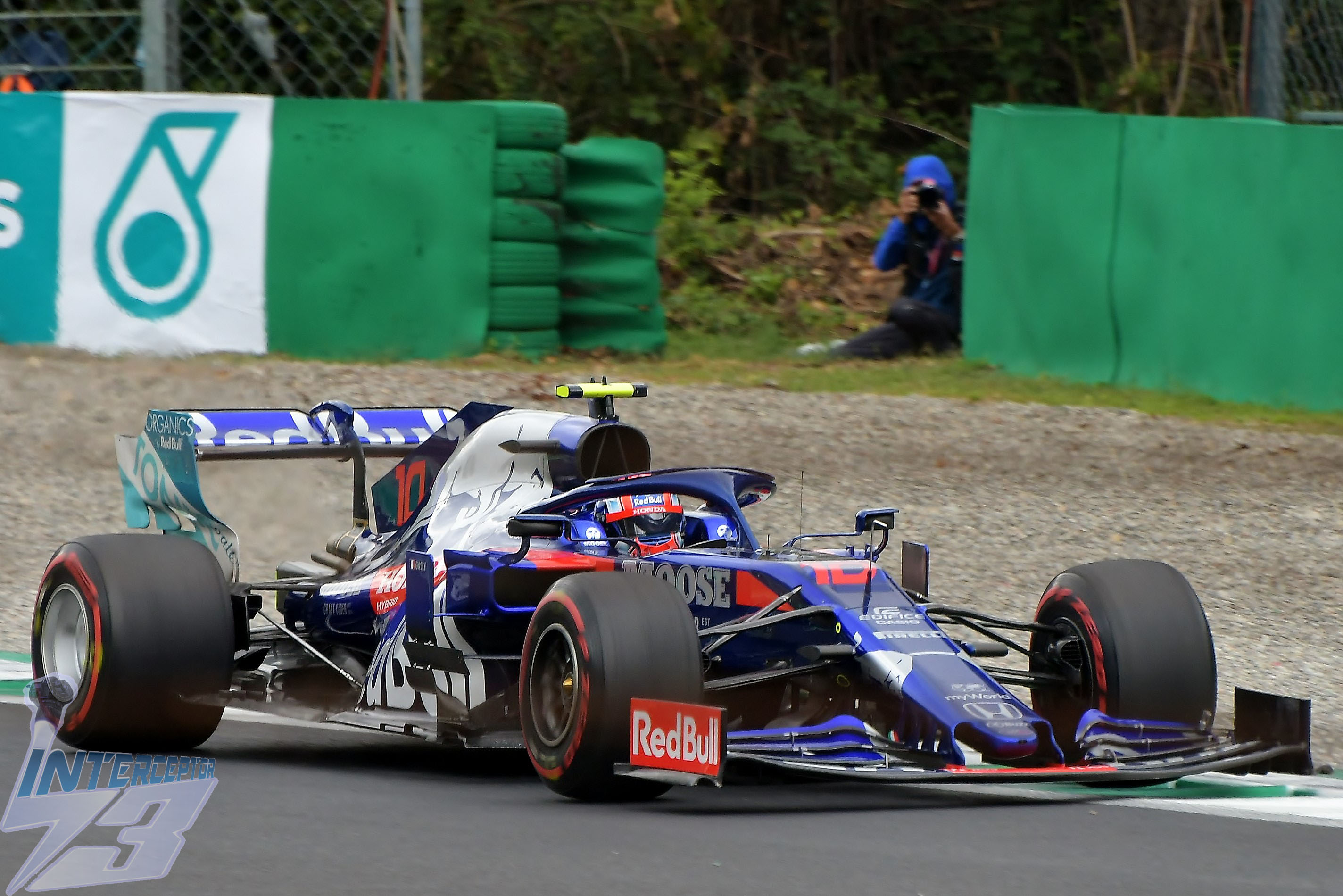
Gasly pictured at the Italian Grand Prix on his second stint with the team, following his demotion from Red Bull after the summer break

Later that year, Pierre Gasly finished second at the Brazilian Grand Prix by 0.062 seconds ahead of Mercedes driver Lewis Hamilton taking the team's third podium, its second of the year, and also his maiden podium finish. This would prove to be the team's most successful season yet, scoring more points than in any other season previously.

== Livery ==
The STR14 sported a very similar blue livery and red accents along with a Red Bull Cola multicoloured flavour branding on the rear wing, which had been applied on its two predecessors with subtle changes. When Albon joined the team, he brought the Thai oil and gas company PTT as well with Moose.

Throughout the season, Toro Rosso had made several tributes and commemorations:

- In Australia, the team paid tribute to Charlie Whiting.
- In China, the team commemorated their 250th Grand Prix entry.
- In Monaco, the team paid tribute to Niki Lauda. His image and the words "Danke Niki" were present on the sidepods, the same as with its senior team.
- The team paid tribute to Anthoine Hubert by bearing "Always with me #AH19" on the halo device (This appeared on Gasly's car during the Belgian and Italian Grands Prix).

== Complete Formula One results ==
(key)

Year	Entrant	Engine	Tyres	Drivers	Grands Prix																					Points	WCC
Year	Entrant	Engine	Tyres	Drivers	AUS	BHR	CHN	AZE	ESP	MON	CAN	FRA	AUT	GBR	GER	HUN	BEL	ITA	SIN	RUS	JPN	MEX	USA	BRA	ABU	Points	WCC
2019	Red Bull Toro Rosso Honda	Honda RA619H	P	(Thailand) Alexander Albon	14	9	10	11	11	8	Ret	15	15	12	6	10										85	6th
2019	Red Bull Toro Rosso Honda	Honda RA619H	P	(France) Pierre Gasly													9	11	8	14	7	9	16^{†}	2	18	85	6th
2019	Red Bull Toro Rosso Honda	Honda RA619H	P	(Russia) Daniil Kvyat	10	12	Ret	Ret	9	7	10	14	17	9	3	15	7	Ret	15	12	10	11	12	10	9	85	6th

^{†} Driver failed to finish the race, but was classified as they had completed over 90% of the winner's race distance.
