= AlphaTauri AT01 =

Scuderia AlphaTauri racing car for the 2020 Formula One season

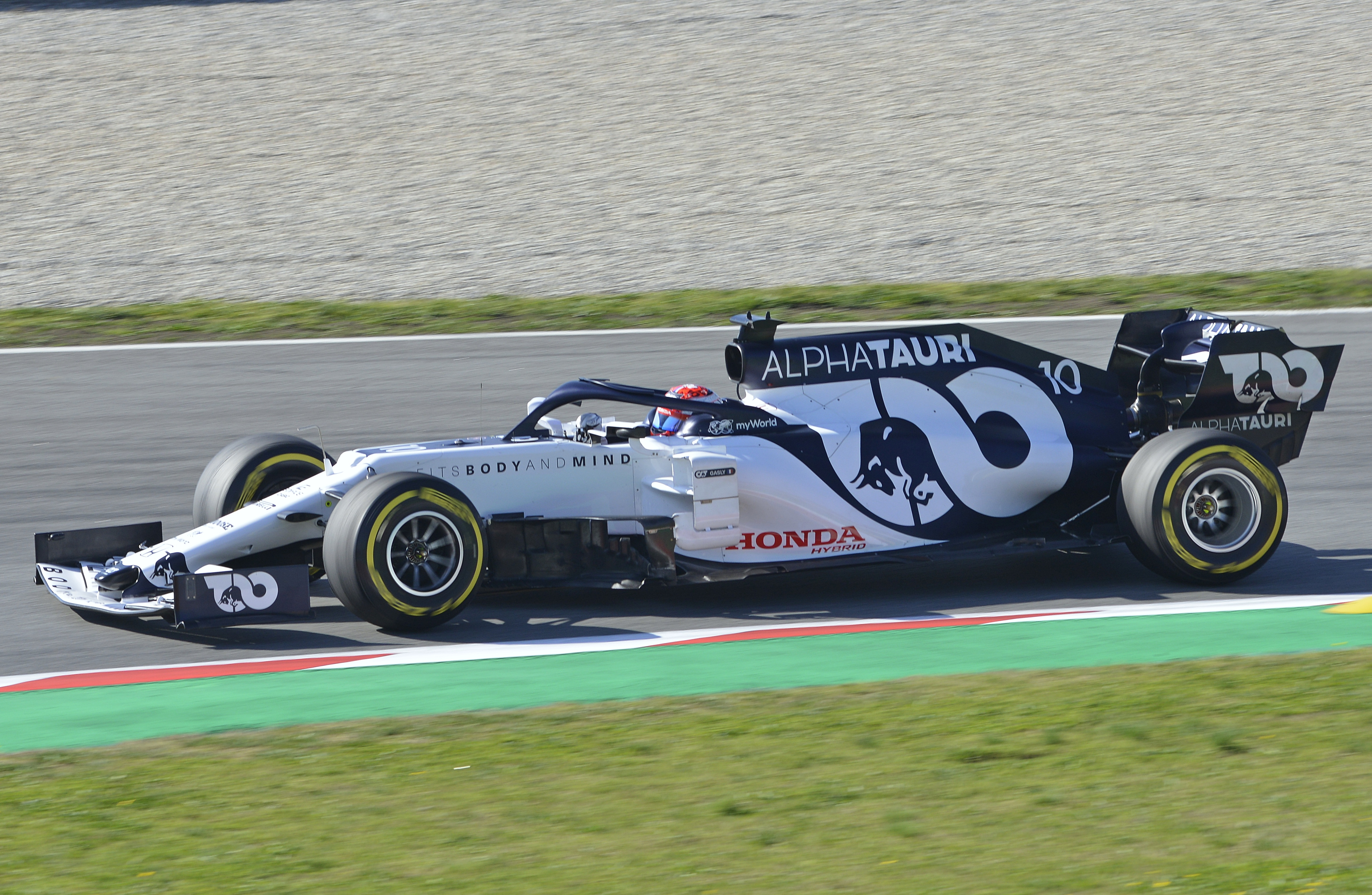
- The AlphaTauri AT01, driven by Pierre Gasly during pre-season testing at Circuit de Barcelona-Catalunya
- Category: Formula One
- Constructor: AlphaTauri
- Designers: Jody Egginton (Technical Director); Paolo Marabini (Chief Designer – Composites and Structures); Trygve Rangen (Chief Designer – Mechanical and Systems); Guillaume Dezoteux (Head of Vehicle Performance); Claudio Balestri (Head of Vehicle Dynamics; Dickon Balmforth (Head of Aerodynamics); Franck Sanchez (Head of Aerodynamic Development)
- Predecessor: Scuderia Toro Rosso STR14
- Successor: AlphaTauri AT02

Technical specifications
- Chassis: Carbon-fibre monocoque and Halo safety cockpit protection device
- Suspension (front): Scuderia AlphaTauri/Red Bull Technology carbon composite wishbones and upright assemblies with pushrod-operated inboard torsion bars and ZF Sachs dampers
- Suspension (rear): Red Bull Technology carbon composite wishbones with pullrod-operated inboard torsion bars and ZF Sachs dampers
- Length: 5,500 mm (217 in) including rear wing
- Width: 2,000 mm (79 in)
- Height: 950 mm (37 in)
- Wheelbase: 3,700 mm (146 in)
- Engine: Honda RA620H 1.6 L (98 cu in) direct injection (jointly developed and supplied by Honda and Hitachi) V6 turbocharged engine limited to 15,000 rpm in a mid-mounted, rear-wheel drive layout
- Electric motor: Honda kinetic and thermal energy recovery systems
- Transmission: Red Bull Technology sequential gearbox with 8 forward and 1 reverse gears, longitudinally mounted with hydraulic system for power shift and clutch operation and limited-slip differential
- Weight: 743 kg (1,638 lb) (including driver, excluding fuel)
- Fuel: Esso Synergy
- Lubricants: Mobil 1
- Brakes: Brembo 6-piston aluminium-lithium calipers, Brembo carbon discs and carbon pads
- Tyres: Pirelli P Zero (dry); Pirelli Cinturato (wet)
- Clutch: ZF Sachs hydraulically-activated carbon multiplate

Competition history
- Notable entrants: Scuderia AlphaTauri Honda
- Notable drivers: 10. (France) Pierre Gasly; 26. (Russia) Daniil Kvyat
- Debut: 2020 Austrian Grand Prix
- First win: 2020 Italian Grand Prix
- Last win: 2020 Italian Grand Prix
- Last event: 2020 Abu Dhabi Grand Prix
Races	Wins	Podiums	Poles	F/Laps
17	1	1	0	0

The AlphaTauri AT01 is a Formula One car designed and constructed by Scuderia AlphaTauri to compete in the 2020 Formula 1 World Championship. The car was driven by Pierre Gasly and Daniil Kvyat. The AT01 was the first car to be built and run under the AlphaTauri name; the team, previously known as Scuderia Toro Rosso, was renamed ahead of the 2020 championship.

The car was planned to make its competitive debut at the 2020 Australian Grand Prix, but this was delayed when the race was cancelled and the next nine events in the championship were postponed or cancelled in response to the COVID-19 pandemic. The AT01 made its debut at the Austrian Grand Prix. The car saw AlphaTauri achieve their only Grand Prix victory, with Pierre Gasly at the Italian Grand Prix.

== Initial design and testing ==
As AlphaTauri is the sister team of Red Bull Racing, the AT01 shares several components—including the suspension, gearbox and hydraulics—with the Red Bull Racing RB16. The car had its first shakedown at the Misano World Circuit Marco Simoncelli. The nose of the AT01 has evolved slightly from the nose of its predecessor, the STR14 with several minor changes relating to air inlets and the bodywork along the side of the front nose.

== Competition history ==
At the season opener at the Austrian Grand Prix, Gasly finished 7th with his teammate, Kvyat, finishing 12th. The rest of the season, Gasly outperformed his teammate and went on to win his first Grand Prix at the Italian Grand Prix. Over the season's 17 races, the car was able to achieve 1 win and 1 podium and finished 7th in the constructors' championship.

== Later use ==
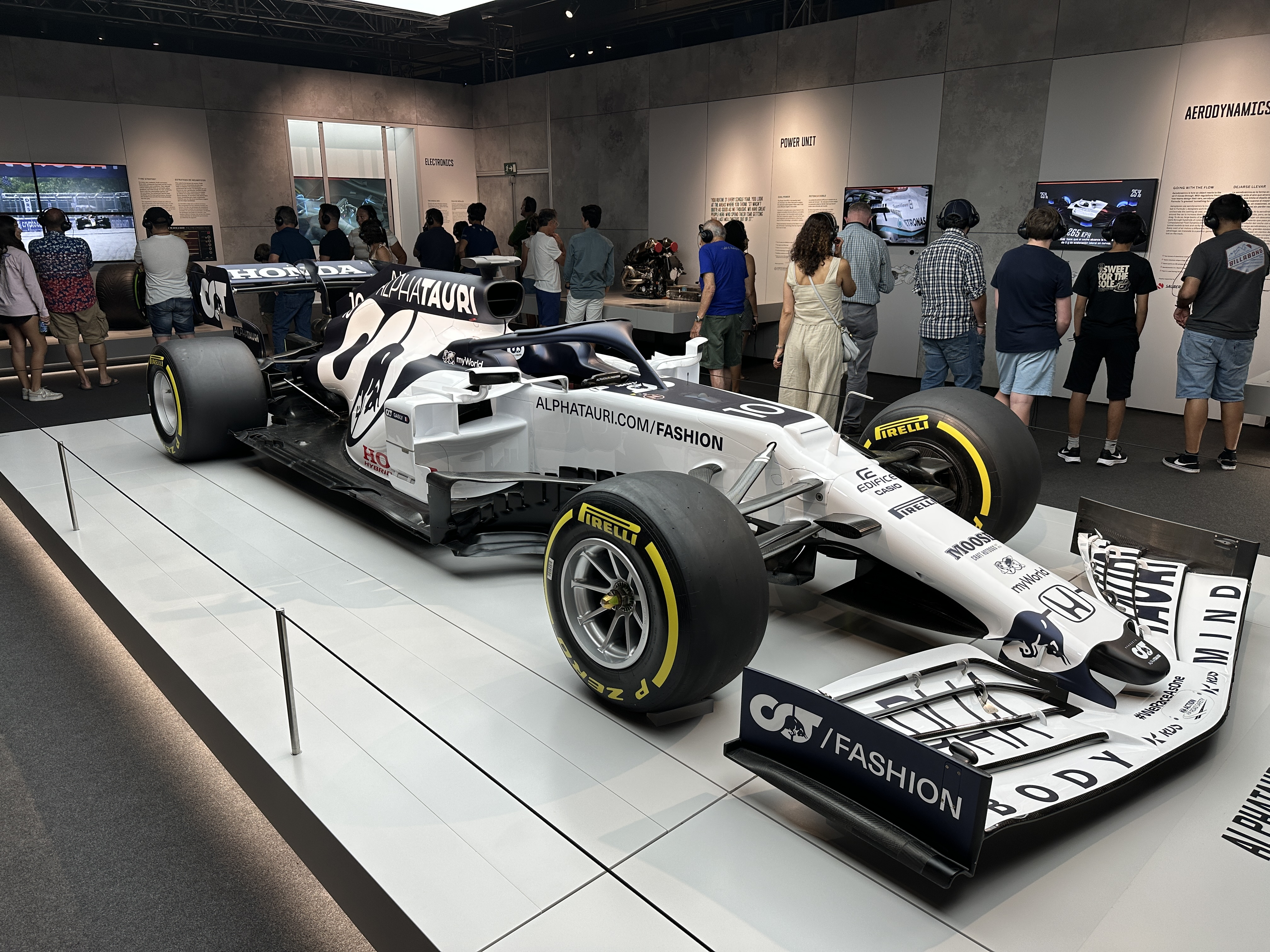
Gasly's race-winning AT01 on display at the F1 Exhibition in Madrid

A modified AT01 was used during testing of the 2022 tyre compounds after the 2021 Abu Dhabi Grand Prix.

== Complete Formula One results ==
(key)

Year	Entrant	Power unit	Tyres	Driver	Grands Prix																	Points	WCC
2020	Scuderia AlphaTauri Honda	Honda RA620H	P		AUT	STY	HUN	GBR	70A	ESP	BEL	ITA	TUS	RUS	EIF	POR	EMI	TUR	BHR	SKH	ABU	107	7th
2020	Scuderia AlphaTauri Honda	Honda RA620H	P	(France) Pierre Gasly	7	15	Ret	7	11	9	8	1	Ret	9	6	5	Ret	13	6	11	8	107	7th
2020	Scuderia AlphaTauri Honda	Honda RA620H	P	(Russia) Daniil Kvyat	12†	10	12	Ret	10	12	11	9	7	8	15	19	4	12	11	7	11	107	7th

Notes

- ^{†} Driver failed to finish the race, but was classified as they had completed over 90% of the winner's race distance.
