= Scuderia Toro Rosso STR13 =

2018 Formula One racing car

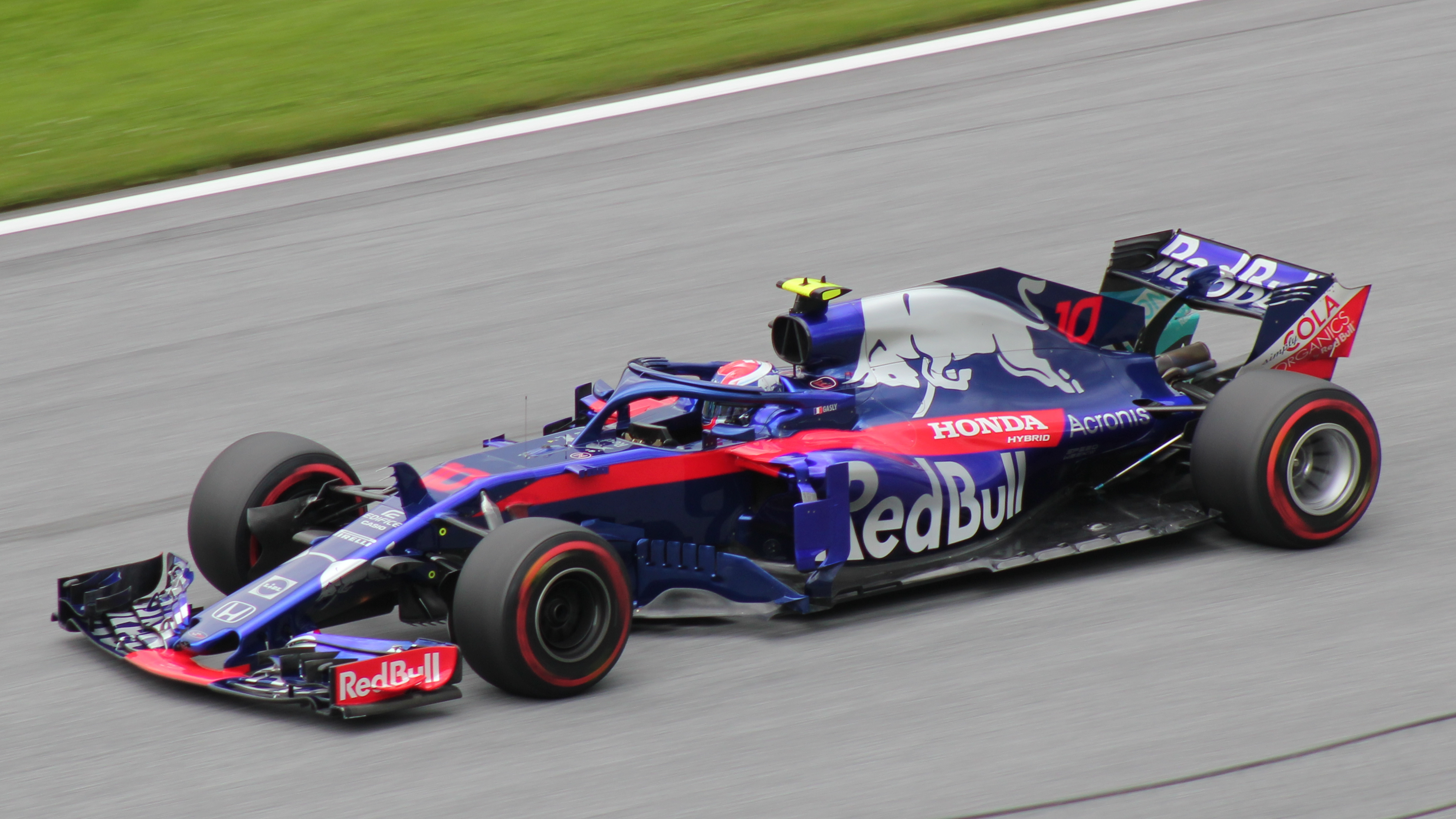
- The STR13, driven by Pierre Gasly, during the Austrian Grand Prix
- Category: Formula One
- Constructor: Scuderia Toro Rosso
- Designers: James Key (Technical Director); Jody Egginton (Deputy Technical Director); Paolo Marabini (Chief Designer – Composites and Structures); Mark Tatham (Chief Designer – Mechanical and Systems); Phil Arnaboldi (Chief Designer – Concept Design); Guillaume Dezoteux (Head of Vehicle Performance); Claudio Balestri (Head of Vehicle Dynamics); Brendan Gilhome (Head of Aerodynamics); Ben Mallock (Deputy Head of Aerodynamics)
- Predecessor: Toro Rosso STR12
- Successor: Scuderia Toro Rosso STR14

Technical specifications
- Chassis: Carbon-fibre monocoque with honeycomb structure and Halo safety cockpit protection
- Suspension (front): Upper and lower carbon wishbones, pushrod, torsion bar springs, anti roll bars. ZF Sachs dampers and springs
- Suspension (rear): Upper and lower carbon wishbones, pullrod, torsion bar springs, anti roll bars. ZF Sachs dampers and springs
- Length: 5,420 mm (213 in) including rear wing
- Width: 2,000 mm (79 in)
- Height: 950 mm (37 in)
- Wheelbase: 3,700 mm (146 in)
- Engine: Honda RA618H 1,600 cc (98 cu in) direct injection (jointly developed and supplied by Honda and Hitachi) V6 turbocharged engine limited to 15,000 rpm in a mid-mounted, rear-wheel drive layout
- Electric motor: Honda kinetic and thermal energy recovery systems
- Transmission: Red Bull Technology 8-speed + 1 reverse sequential semi-automatic, longitudinally mounted with hydraulic system for power shift and clutch operation
- Battery: Honda Racing F1 lithium-ion
- Weight: 734 kg (1,618 lb) including driver
- Fuel: Esso
- Lubricants: Mobil 1
- Brakes: Brembo brake-by-wire system with 6-piston calipers, carbon discs and pads
- Tyres: Pirelli P Zero (dry); Pirelli Cinturato (wet); APP-Tech forged magnesium wheels: 13"
- Clutch: ZF Sachs hydraulically-activated carbon multiplate

Competition history
- Notable entrants: Red Bull Toro Rosso Honda
- Notable drivers: 10. (France) Pierre Gasly; 28. (New Zealand) Brendon Hartley
- Debut: 2018 Australian Grand Prix
- Last event: 2018 Abu Dhabi Grand Prix
| Races | Wins | Podiums | Poles | F/Laps |
|---|---|---|---|---|
| 21 | 0 | 0 | 0 | 0 |

The Scuderia Toro Rosso STR13 is a Formula One racing car designed and constructed by Scuderia Toro Rosso to compete in the 2018 FIA Formula One World Championship. The car was driven by Pierre Gasly and Brendon Hartley, both of whom were retained by the team after contesting selected events in 2017. The STR13 made its competitive début at the 2018 Australian Grand Prix and is the first car built by Scuderia Toro Rosso to use a Honda engine after the team agreed to end its engine partnership deal with Renault to allow the French manufacturer to partner McLaren.

== Design and development ==
=== Engine partnership ===
In September 2017, McLaren Honda announced they were terminating their partnership with effect from the close of the 2017 season. During negotiations to secure a new supplier, Renault disclosed that they did not have the capacity to supply McLaren whilst meeting their commitments to customer teams Red Bull Racing and Scuderia Toro Rosso. As part of a discussion between Renault, McLaren, Toro Rosso and Red Bull, Toro Rosso announced it would end their customer relationship with Renault and instead form a factory works partnership with Honda in a deal lasting through to 2021.

==== Engine development ====
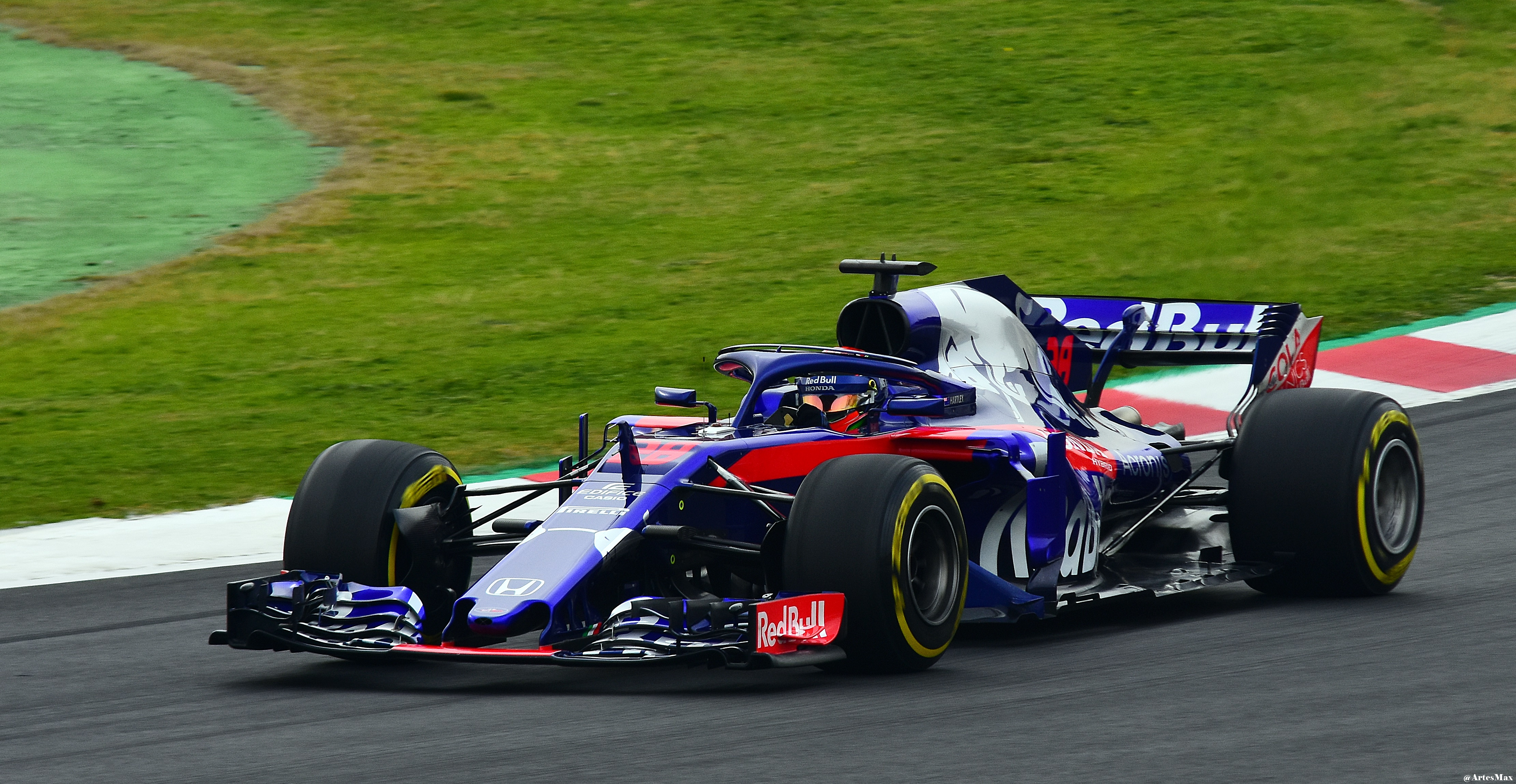
Brendon Hartley driving the STR13 during the pre-season testing

In a departure from the last three seasons with McLaren, at pre-season testing in Barcelona, Honda showed significant progress with its power unit completing the second highest lap tally of 93 in the first day without any issue with Brendon Hartley at the helm. The second day of testing went just as well, with STR completing 82 laps, the third highest tally again with no issue, this time with Pierre Gasly in the driver's seat. At the close of the first test, Toro Rosso topped the total mileage charts finishing off with Pierre Gasly completing 147 laps on the final day, this showed that Honda with Toro Rosso, had completed more laps in week one than Honda had completed with McLaren in the entire test fortnight in 2017. Following the close of testing, Hartley claimed the Honda PU was easier to drive and felt more powerful than the units supplied by Renault at the end of last season.

Following a PU failure in Gasly's car during the Australian Grand Prix following a hit from a curb, Honda revealed he had suffered from an MGU-H failure, an issue which was well known to be Honda's Achilles heel for the last few years. Honda responded with a fix to the issue making note that both drivers were still using the flawed 2017 MGU-H as the brand new system they had developed for the 2018 power unit was not going to be ready in time for the first round. In Bahrain, both drivers took the new MGU-H specification, however Gasly required an entire new PU due to collateral damage caused from the MGU-H failure in Australia. After making significant progress with the PU mapping during the practice sessions at Bahrain, Pierre Gasly managed a 6th place during qualifying which he was able to turn into a 4th-place result during the race. This was the highest finishing position for Honda since returning to F1 in 2015.

At the Canadian Grand Prix, Honda debuted its Spec 2 PU which they revealed was focused on developments to the ICE with the aim of improving power without compromising reliability, it is believed the area of improvement was around the cylinder head, specifically the combustion chamber design. The update was praised by driver Gasly who noted it was immediately more driveable and punchier than the previous iteration. Comparisons in lap times during practice between the previous unit and the updated unit were showing a near 0.5-second improvement at the Circuit Gilles Villeneuve. Honda claimed the unit should only improve with further analysis and adjustments made to the mapping as the season progresses, however after an initially strong debut for the upgrade, reliability issues appeared on Pierre Gasly's PU which Honda remarked seemed to be isolated issues not related to the upgrade and would investigate further.

After several lacklustre performances at a variety of track layouts, Toro Rosso said they were trying to figure out their entire package with correlation issues on the aero updates and even Honda's upgraded unit and what its actual potential could be as it seemed to run reliably but was sensitive to conditions and track layout. Red Bull's race director Christian Horner, who announced that Red Bull Racing had signed a 2-year engine supply deal with Honda starting from 2019 to replace Renault, citing Honda's enormous improvement in Canada showing great potential in their development pace, claimed the Honda and Renault PU were within 1% of each other in race trim.

Honda's F1 Technical Director, Toyoharu Tanabe, made mention that Honda's PU upgrade plan for 2018 was on track and going well and that with the introduction of Spec 2 in Canada and its subsequent improvements in the following races they were focused sharply on the Spec 3 upgrade which has since been revealed to be a brand new combustion process in which Honda plans to patent (further details Honda refuses to divulge), a redesigned MGU-K and battery, with a tentative debut around the Russian Grand Prix.

After showing promising pace amongst the midfield with strong finishes at both the Belgian and the Hungarian Grand Prix, while also demonstrating relative strength at power sensitive circuits such as Spa and Monza Circuit where the team believed they may struggle, following the Italian Grand Prix at Monza, German publication Auto Motor und Sport released a report claiming they had calculated an estimate for the power figures of each manufacturer using the latest GPS data gathered from Monza. The data revealed Honda's Spec 2 PU, which debuted in Canada, to produce 715 hp without electrical assistance, which put it ahead of Renault's Spec B used by the Renault works team and McLaren, however behind by a margin of 15 hp to Renault's newly introduced Spec C PU (Italian GP) which is only utilised by Red Bull Racing. However AMuS also reported that Honda had made great strides with the development of their Spec 3 PU with initial tests suggesting a power output of around 750 hp and that it may be ready for introduction at the Russian Grand Prix in Sochi, two race weekends earlier than planned.

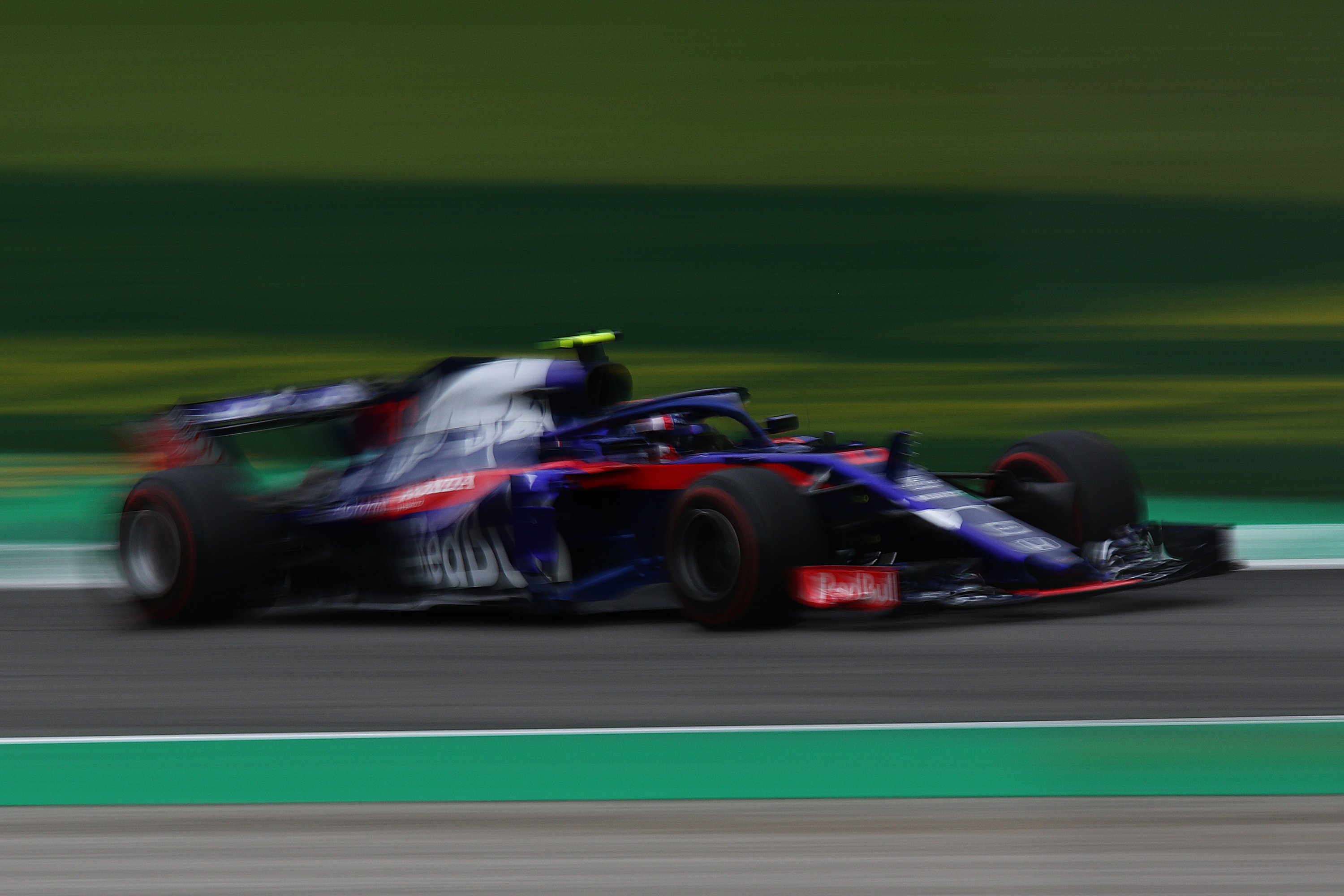
Gasly at the team's home race, the Italian Grand Prix

At the Russian Grand Prix, Honda debuted their much-anticipated Spec 3 PU in the practice sessions. Initial comments from the drivers were highly promising, both describing a noticeable jump in outright power. As the practice sessions progressed, Honda kept improving the mapping, finding more power each outing. Towards the end, the drivers noted that there were some fairly prominent vibrations on upshift with the new unit and despite the power increase, was disconcerting to continue driving it. Post-practice, Honda told media representatives the engine had provided more power than originally expected so early on; however this had a knock-on effect when paired to the STR gearbox in the car. Honda then opted to revert to the Spec 2 units for the rest of the weekend while engineers from Toro Rosso and Honda made further refinements to the Spec 3 at Milton Keynes in order to have the engine competition ready by next round in Japan (Honda's home race).

At the Japanese Grand Prix, STR made the competitive debut with the brand new Spec 3 unit. Honda claimed to of made even further improvements since the last GP after spending much of the time between refining the unit on the dyno. The results on track reflected the claims, with qualifying proving to be one of Honda's best results since returning to F1, both cars making it to Q3 to place 6th and 7th respectively.

Toro Rosso finished ninth in the Constructors' Championship, scoring just 33 points throughout the whole season - the team's worst season since 2012.

=== Personnel ===
In January 2018, the team announced that their Head of Aerodynamics, Brendon Gilhorne, would be leaving the team.

== Later use ==
In 2020, Yuki Tsunoda test drove the STR13 in AlphaTauri AT01 livery at the Imola Circuit, prior to his debut with the team.

== Complete Formula One results ==
(key) (results in bold indicate pole position; results in italics indicate fastest lap)

| Year | Entrant | Engine | Tyres | Drivers | Grands Prix | | | | | | | | | | | | | | | | | | | | | Points | WCC |
| Year | Entrant | Engine | Tyres | Drivers | AUS | BHR | CHN | AZE | ESP | MON | CAN | FRA | AUT | GBR | GER | HUN | BEL | ITA | SIN | RUS | JPN | USA | MEX | BRA | ABU | Points | WCC |
|---|---|---|---|---|---|---|---|---|---|---|---|---|---|---|---|---|---|---|---|---|---|---|---|---|---|---|---|
| 2018 | Red Bull Toro Rosso Honda | Honda RA618H | **P** | (France) Pierre Gasly | Ret | 4 | 18 | 12 | Ret | 7 | 11 | Ret | 11 | 13 | 14 | 6 | 9 | 14 | 13 | Ret | 11 | 12 | 10 | 13 | Ret | 33 | 9th |
| 2018 | Red Bull Toro Rosso Honda | Honda RA618H | **P** | (New Zealand) Brendon Hartley | 15 | 17 | 20^{†} | 10 | 12 | 19^{†} | Ret | 14 | Ret | Ret | 10 | 11 | 14 | Ret | 17 | Ret | 13 | 9 | 14 | 11 | 12 | 33 | 9th |

^{†} Driver failed to finish the race, but was classified as they had completed over 90% of the winner's race distance.
