= 2019 Italian Grand Prix =

2019 Formula 1 motor race in Monza, Italy

Race 14 of 21 in the 2019 Formula One World Championship
| ← Previous race | Next race → |
- Layout of the Monza circuit

Race details
- Date: 8 September 2019
- Official name: Formula 1 Gran Premio Heineken d'Italia 2019
- Location: Autodromo Nazionale di Monza; Monza, Italy
- Course: Permanent racing facility
- Course length: 5.793 km (3.600 miles)
- Distance: 53 laps, 306.720 km (190.587 miles)
- Weather: Partly cloudy
- Attendance: 200,000

Pole position
| Driver | (Monaco) Charles Leclerc | Ferrari |
- Time: 1:19.307

Fastest lap
| Driver | (United Kingdom) Lewis Hamilton | Mercedes |
- Time: 1:21.779 on lap 51

Podium
| First | (Monaco) Charles Leclerc | Ferrari |
| Second | (Finland) Valtteri Bottas | Mercedes |
| Third | (United Kingdom) Lewis Hamilton | Mercedes |

The 2019 Italian Grand Prix (formally known as the Formula 1 Gran Premio Heineken d'Italia 2019) was a Formula One motor race held on 8 September 2019 at the Autodromo Nazionale di Monza in Monza, Italy. The race was the 14th round of the 2019 Formula One World Championship and marked the 89th running of the Italian Grand Prix and the 84th time the race had been held at Monza. The Grand Prix ended with Leclerc claiming his second consecutive race win and Ferrari's first win in Italy since Fernando Alonso won the 2010 edition of the race. Ferrari would not see another win in Italy until 2024, won again by Leclerc.

== Background ==
=== Championship standings before the race ===
Mercedes driver Lewis Hamilton entered the round with a 65-point lead over teammate Valtteri Bottas in the Drivers' Championship. In the Constructors' World Championship, Mercedes led Ferrari by 145 points.

=== Entries ===
The drivers and teams entered were the same as those for the previous race with no additional stand-in drivers for the race or practice.

== Practice ==
The first practice session was affected by rain and saw Charles Leclerc finish the session fastest followed by Carlos Sainz Jr. and Lando Norris. The session was interrupted three times, firstly when Kimi Räikkönen spun and got stuck in the gravel trap at turn 11. Sergio Pérez also crashed his car on the exit of turn 10 and finally when Pierre Gasly beached his car on the kerbs at turn 2. The session was also filled with spins from a number of other drivers.

The second practice session was dry for the first hour before it started raining and the session once again saw Leclerc set the fastest time but this time it was Lewis Hamilton who was second fastest and Sebastian Vettel was third. The third practice session was delayed and shortened by 10 minutes following an accident during the support Formula 3 race and finished with Vettel fastest followed by Max Verstappen and Valtteri Bottas.

== Qualifying ==
=== Qualifying report ===
==== Q1 and Q2 ====
The first 18-minute qualifying session, Q1, was temporarily red-flagged with 4:34 remaining, when Sergio Pérez's car lost power on the inside of turn 3. Max Verstappen, already facing grid penalties for replacing power unit components, did not set a time in the session. Verstappen and Pérez were eliminated in Q1, as were both Williams drivers, Robert Kubica and George Russell, and the Haas of Romain Grosjean. The session finished with Charles Leclerc fastest for Scuderia Ferrari. In the second qualifying (Q2) session, the other Haas of Kevin Magnussen was eliminated, as were both Toro Rosso drivers, Pierre Gasly and Daniil Kvyat. Alfa Romeo's Antonio Giovinazzi was the final driver eliminated in Q2, beaten by his teammate Kimi Räikkönen for the last spot for the third qualifying session (Q3) by 0.002 seconds. Racing Point driver Lance Stroll made it into Q3 for the first time in 2019. Lewis Hamilton set the fastest time of Q2 which meant that Mercedes led a session for the first time in the weekend.

==== Q3 ====
Q3, only 12 minutes long, was red-flagged at 6:35 left when Räikkönen lost control of his car and spun out wide into the tyre barriers at turn 11. After Räikkönen's car was cleared and the session resumed, two of the remaining nine drivers had still not set a time; Red Bull's Alexander Albon, and Stroll. When the session restarted, no team wanted to be the first to send their driver out as Monza is a track where slipstreaming is a significant advantage. As time began to wind down, speculation grew as to who would leave the pit lane first. The Q3 drivers did not make their way out of their garages until there were two minutes left in the session, with Renault driver Nico Hülkenberg leading the pack.

When he got to turn 1, Hülkenberg missed the turn and instead navigated through the run-off slip road past Turn 1. This action led to him being accused of deliberately taking the run-off in an effort to let other drivers past. Stroll and Carlos Sainz Jr, the next two drivers back, slowed their traversal of Turn 1, allowing enough time for Hülkenberg to again enter the track ahead of them. By the time the tight pack of drivers, led by Sainz and Hülkenberg, reached turn 3 on their out-laps, the margin of error allowing for drivers to reach the start line by the end of the Q3 session time was virtually gone. Ultimately, only Sainz and Leclerc successfully completed their out laps. All seven drivers behind them were caught out and thus crossed the line too late to have an opportunity to set a time in the second half of Q3. Sainz, the only driver who made a meaningful attempt, was unable to improve his first Q3 time enough to move out of seventh. The result meant that neither Albon or Stroll set a lap time.

There was strong criticism of what had happened in the final minutes of Q3. Red Bull's team principal Christian Horner's interpretation of Hülkenberg's move was that it was "obviously done on purpose", and beyond stating that the result was "all just a bit silly", described the qualifying as a 'complete clusterfuck'. Mercedes team principal Toto Wolff described Hülkenberg's chicane cut and the collective drivers' out-lap slowdowns as "junior class", and "not worthy of Formula 1."

Hülkenberg, Sainz, and Stroll were called in by the race stewards to be investigated for "driving unnecessarily slowly" on their Q3 out laps. The stewards further investigated Hülkenberg for potentially "leaving the track without a justifiable reason". Hülkenberg was cleared of wrongdoing with respect to leaving the track. The stewards stated, "In this case we are unable to determine that the driver deliberately left the track." All three of the drivers were reprimanded for driving too slowly, which they admitted they did do, and which the stewards concluded "played a significant role in the backing up of cars at a critical stage of the final out lap for Q3". The race stewards concluded the investigation of the three drivers with the remark, "The Stewards strongly recommend that the FIA expedite a solution to this type of situation".

=== Qualifying classification ===
| Pos. | Car no. | Driver | Constructor | Qualifying times | | | Final grid |
| Pos. | Car no. | Driver | Constructor | Q1 | Q2 | Q3 | Final grid |
|---|---|---|---|---|---|---|---|
| 1 | 16 | (Monaco) Charles Leclerc | Ferrari | 1:20.126 | 1:19.553 | 1:19.307 | 1 |
| 2 | 44 | (United Kingdom) Lewis Hamilton | Mercedes | 1:20.272 | 1:19.464 | 1:19.346 | 2 |
| 3 | 77 | (Finland) Valtteri Bottas | Mercedes | 1:20.156 | 1:20.018 | 1:19.354 | 3 |
| 4 | 5 | (Germany) Sebastian Vettel | Ferrari | 1:20.378 | 1:19.715 | 1:19.457 | 4 |
| 5 | 3 | (Australia) Daniel Ricciardo | Renault | 1:20.374 | 1:19.833 | 1:19.839 | 5 |
| 6 | 27 | (Germany) Nico Hülkenberg | Renault | 1:20.155 | 1:20.275 | 1:20.049 | 6 |
| 7 | 55 | (Spain) Carlos Sainz Jr. | McLaren-Renault | 1:20.413 | 1:20.202 | 1:20.455 | 7 |
| 8 | 23 | (Thailand) Alexander Albon | Red Bull Racing-Honda | 1:20.382 | 1:20.021 | No time | 8 |
| 9 | 18 | (Canada) Lance Stroll | Racing Point-BWT Mercedes | 1:20.643 | 1:20.498 | No time | 9 |
| 10 | 7 | (Finland) Kimi Räikkönen | Alfa Romeo Racing-Ferrari | 1:20.634 | 1:20.515 | No time | PL^{a} |
| 11 | 99 | (Italy) Antonio Giovinazzi | Alfa Romeo Racing-Ferrari | 1:20.657 | 1:20.517 | N/A | 10 |
| 12 | 20 | (Denmark) Kevin Magnussen | Haas-Ferrari | 1:20.616 | 1:20.615 | N/A | 11 |
| 13 | 26 | (Russia) Daniil Kvyat | Scuderia Toro Rosso-Honda | 1:20.723 | 1:20.630 | N/A | 12 |
| 14 | 4 | (United Kingdom) Lando Norris | McLaren-Renault | 1:20.646 | 1:21.068 | N/A | 16^{b} |
| 15 | 10 | (France) Pierre Gasly | Scuderia Toro Rosso-Honda | 1:20.508 | 1:21.125 | N/A | 17^{b} |
| 16 | 8 | (France) Romain Grosjean | Haas-Ferrari | 1:20.784 | N/A | N/A | 13 |
| 17 | 11 | (Mexico) Sergio Pérez | Racing Point-BWT Mercedes | 1:21.291 | N/A | N/A | 18^{b} |
| 18 | 63 | (United Kingdom) George Russell | Williams-Mercedes | 1:21.800 | N/A | N/A | 14 |
| 19 | 88 | (Poland) Robert Kubica | Williams-Mercedes | 1:22.356 | N/A | N/A | 15 |
107% time: 1:25.734
| — | 33 | (Netherlands) Max Verstappen | Red Bull Racing-Honda | No time | N/A | N/A | 19^{c} |

Notes

- ^a – Kimi Räikkönen was required to start from the pit lane for changing power unit components under parc fermé conditions.
- ^b – Lando Norris, Pierre Gasly and Sergio Pérez were all demoted to the back of the grid for exceeding their quota for power unit components.
- ^c – Max Verstappen was initially required to start from the back of the grid for exceeding his quota for power unit components, but failed to set a lap time during qualifying. He was allowed to race at the stewards' discretion.

== Race ==
=== Race report ===
The top four drivers on the grid maintained their positions through turn 1 as the race began, with Charles Leclerc turning pole position into an early race lead. Max Verstappen, who started 19th on the grid, made contact with Sergio Pérez, damaging his front wing and requiring an early pit stop to replace it.

On lap 6, Sebastian Vettel, running a strong 4th, lost control and spun to a stop at turn 9, his car halfway onto the grass. In an attempt to rejoin as quickly as possible, Vettel veered into the path of Lance Stroll, who was in 7th. Vettel struck Stroll, damaging his own front wing, and further causing Stroll to spin out. When Stroll tried to rejoin the track, he in turn forced Pierre Gasly to drive through the gravel run off to in an attempt to avoid Stroll. Vettel was forced to replace his front wing at the end of lap 6, leaving him in last place. Stroll was pushed down to 13th. Race stewards investigated the double-incident. They penalised Vettel with a ten-second stop-go penalty, and Stroll with a drive-through penalty. Neither driver would recover to finish in the top ten. Vettel also received three penalty points on his FIA Super Licence for the incident.

==== Pit stops ====
By lap 19, the top three drivers (Leclerc, Lewis Hamilton, and Valtteri Bottas, in order) were in a pit window to replace the aging soft tyres they started their races on. Hamilton was the first to do so, replacing his with medium tyres. Leclerc pitted on lap 20, but elected instead to use the longer lasting but slower hard tyre. Bottas, who also chose the medium tyre, would not pit until lap 27. All three drivers returned to racing in the same order they'd been in before their pit stops. Carlos Sainz retired from the race on lap 29, after an error fitting his right front tyre in the pits forced him to stop near the exit to pit lane; this caused a brief virtual safety car. Shortly after, Daniil Kvyat's Toro Rosso suffered a mechanical breakdown just past turn 1, causing a second virtual safety car while his car was pushed to safety.

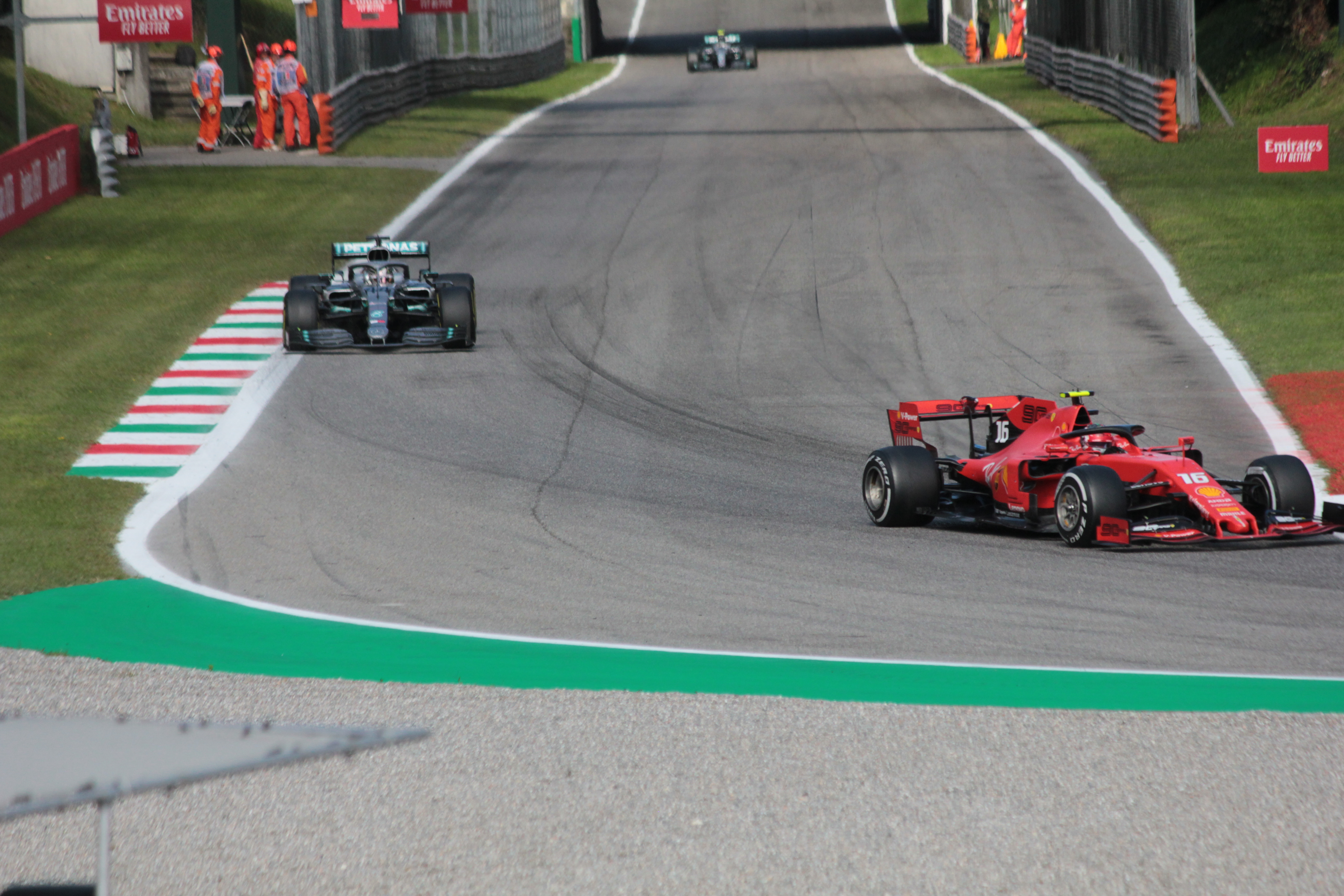
Charles Leclerc (right) leads, followed by Lewis Hamilton (left) and Valtteri Bottas (background)

In the meantime, Leclerc's lead would be challenged for the remainder of the race by the Mercedes drivers behind him. After Leclerc and Hamilton's pit stops, Hamilton came close on several occasions to overtaking Leclerc, more than once less than one second behind and enabling him to use DRS. Both drivers exchanged occasional driving errors and Leclerc was warned once for pushing Hamilton off track. Hamilton consistently stayed close to Leclerc, but was unable to overtake him for the race lead. On lap 42, Hamilton locked up his tyres at turn 1, allowing Bottas to pass him into 2nd position. Bottas, who had medium tyres eight laps younger than Hamilton's, was able to challenge Leclerc for the lead just as Hamilton had done. Bottas came within one second of Leclerc on multiple occasions in the race's later stages, but, like Hamilton, he could not overtake Leclerc.

==== Race finish ====
The Grand Prix ended with Leclerc claiming his second consecutive race win and Ferrari's first win in Italy since Fernando Alonso won the 2010 edition of the race. It would be Leclerc's last victory until the 2022 Bahrain Grand Prix. Bottas was less than a second behind to take 2nd, and Hamilton, who made a late-race pit stop for soft tyres set the fastest lap of the race and took the last step of the podium. Renault's Daniel Ricciardo and Nico Hülkenberg finished strong in 4th and 5th positions, promoting Renault into 5th in the Constructor's championship. This also meant that they were only 18 points behind fourth placed McLaren. Alexander Albon managed a 6th-place finish for Red Bull, finishing one second behind Hülkenberg. Pérez and Verstappen, who both started at the back of the grid, ended in 7th and 8th. Antonio Giovinazzi (Alfa Romeo) finished 9th and Lando Norris (McLaren) finished in tenth, the final points position.

=== Race classification ===
| Pos. | No. | Driver | Constructor | Laps | Time/Retired | Grid | Points |
|---|---|---|---|---|---|---|---|
| 1 | 16 | (Monaco) Charles Leclerc | Ferrari | 53 | 1:15:26.665 | 1 | 25 |
| 2 | 77 | (Finland) Valtteri Bottas | Mercedes | 53 | +0.835 | 3 | 18 |
| 3 | 44 | (United Kingdom) Lewis Hamilton | Mercedes | 53 | +35.199 | 2 | 16^{1} |
| 4 | 3 | (Australia) Daniel Ricciardo | Renault | 53 | +45.515 | 5 | 12 |
| 5 | 27 | (Germany) Nico Hülkenberg | Renault | 53 | +58.165 | 6 | 10 |
| 6 | 23 | (Thailand) Alexander Albon | Red Bull Racing-Honda | 53 | +59.315 | 8 | 8 |
| 7 | 11 | (Mexico) Sergio Pérez | Racing Point-BWT Mercedes | 53 | +1:13.802 | 18 | 6 |
| 8 | 33 | (Netherlands) Max Verstappen | Red Bull Racing-Honda | 53 | +1:14.492 | 19 | 4 |
| 9 | 99 | (Italy) Antonio Giovinazzi | Alfa Romeo Racing-Ferrari | 52 | +1 lap | 10 | 2 |
| 10 | 4 | (United Kingdom) Lando Norris | McLaren-Renault | 52 | +1 lap | 16 | 1 |
| 11 | 10 | (France) Pierre Gasly | Scuderia Toro Rosso-Honda | 52 | +1 lap | 17 | |
| 12 | 18 | (Canada) Lance Stroll | Racing Point-BWT Mercedes | 52 | +1 lap | 9 | |
| 13 | 5 | (Germany) Sebastian Vettel | Ferrari | 52 | +1 lap | 4 | |
| 14 | 63 | (United Kingdom) George Russell | Williams-Mercedes | 52 | +1 lap | 14 | |
| 15 | 7 | (Finland) Kimi Räikkönen | Alfa Romeo Racing-Ferrari | 52 | +1 lap | PL | |
| 16 | 8 | (France) Romain Grosjean | Haas-Ferrari | 52 | +1 lap | 13 | |
| 17 | 88 | (Poland) Robert Kubica | Williams-Mercedes | 51 | +2 laps | 15 | |
| Ret | 20 | (Denmark) Kevin Magnussen | Haas-Ferrari | 43 | Hydraulics | 11 | |
| Ret | 26 | (Russia) Daniil Kvyat | Scuderia Toro Rosso-Honda | 29 | Oil leak | 12 | |
| Ret | 55 | (Spain) Carlos Sainz Jr. | McLaren-Renault | 27 | Wheel | 7 | |
Fastest lap: (United Kingdom) Lewis Hamilton (Mercedes) – 1:21.779 (lap 51)

Notes

- ^1 – Includes one point for fastest lap.

== Championship standings after the race ==
Drivers' Championship standings

| | Pos. | Driver | Points |
|---|---|---|---|
| | 1 | (United Kingdom) Lewis Hamilton | 284 |
| | 2 | (Finland) Valtteri Bottas | 221 |
| | 3 | (Netherlands) Max Verstappen | 185 |
| 1 | 4 | (Monaco) Charles Leclerc | 182 |
| 1 | 5 | (Germany) Sebastian Vettel | 169 |

Constructors' Championship standings

| | Pos. | Constructor | Points |
|---|---|---|---|
| | 1 | (Germany) Mercedes | 505 |
| | 2 | (Italy) Ferrari | 351 |
| | 3 | (Austria) Red Bull Racing-Honda | 266 |
| | 4 | (United Kingdom) McLaren-Renault | 83 |
| 1 | 5 | (France) Renault | 65 |

Note

- Only the top five positions for each set of standings are shown

== See also ==
- 2019 Monza Formula 2 round
- 2019 Monza Formula 3 round

| Previous race: 2019 Belgian Grand Prix | FIA Formula One World Championship; 2019 season | Next race: 2019 Singapore Grand Prix |
| Previous race: 2018 Italian Grand Prix | Italian Grand Prix | Next race: 2020 Italian Grand Prix |
