= Dickon Balmforth =

British aerodynamicist

- Citizenship: British
- Education: University of Cambridge
- Years active: 2003–2023
- Known for: Formula One aerodynamicist

Dickon Balmforth is a British Formula One and motorsport aerodynamicist. He is best known for serving as the Head of Aerodynamics at the Scuderia Alpha Tauri and Scuderia Toro Rosso teams.

== Career ==
Balmforth studied engineering at the University of Cambridge, graduating with a Master of Engineering degree in 2001. He began his professional career in aerodynamics in 2002 as a CFD engineer, before joining Williams Racing in 2003 as an aerodynamicist. During his time at Grove he worked on wind-tunnel development and aerodynamic performance analysis. In 2005 Balmforth joined Red Bull Racing as an aerodynamics engineer during the team's formative years following its acquisition of Jaguar Racing. He progressed through a series of senior roles, becoming Aerodynamics Development Team Leader in 2008 and later Principal Aerodynamicist in 2014. During this period he played a key role in the aerodynamic development of the cars that secured four consecutive Drivers’ and Constructors’ Championships between 2010 and 2013.

In 2018 he moved to Scuderia Toro Rosso as Head of Aerodynamics, leading the department's design and development activities from its Bicester facility. He remained with the team when it rebranded into Scuderia AlphaTauri for the 2020 season. Under his leadership the team achieved its most competitive modern period, including a victory at the 2020 Italian Grand Prix and multiple podium finishes, alongside record points totals across successive seasons. Balmforth departed AlphaTauri in 2023 and, in 2024, was appointed Head of Aerodynamics at the Aircraft Research Association (ARA) in Bedford, applying his experience in aerodynamic development to advanced research and industrial programmes.
