= Pete Machin =

British aerodynamicist

- Citizenship: British
- Education: Queen's University Belfast
- Occupation: Aerodynamicist
- Years active: 1997–present
- Employer: Audi F1 Team
- Title: Principal Aerodynamicist

Peter Machin is a Northern Irish Formula One and motorsports aerodynamicist. He is currently the Principal Aerodynamicist for the Audi F1 Team.

== Career ==
Machin studied aeronautical engineering at Queen's University Belfast. He began his engineering career in the aerospace sector with Bombardier Aerospace in 1991, working as an aerodynamicist before moving into motorsport in 1997 when he joined Arrows as a Senior CFD Engineer. There he specialised in computational fluid dynamics and aerodynamic development during a period in which Formula One teams were rapidly expanding the use of simulation-led design tools.

In 2002 he joined Jaguar Racing as CFD Team Leader, remaining with the organisation following its transformation into Red Bull Racing. During his tenure he contributed to the development of the team's aerodynamic capability and was part of the engineering structure that produced the cars which secured four consecutive Drivers’ and Constructors’ Championships between 2010 and 2013.

Seeking a new challenge, Machin moved to Enstone in 2017 to become Head of Aerodynamics for Renault F1 Team, overseeing aerodynamic development during the squad's rebuilding phase. He remained in this role until 2020, after which he was succeeded by Dirk de Beer. Machin subsequently joined Scuderia AlphaTauri as Chief Aerodynamicist, leading aerodynamic design and performance programmes at the team's Bicester aerodynamic facility, and continued in the position when the team was rebranded as Racing Bulls.

In 2025, Machin relocated to Hinwil to take up the position of Principal Aerodynamicist with the Audi F1 Team, joining the organisation during its transition from Sauber Motorsport to the full Audi works entry.
