= Trygve Rangen =

Canadian engineer

- Citizenship: Canadian
- Occupation: Engineer
- Employer: Racing Bulls
- Title: Principal engineer, engineering strategy

Trygve Rangen is a Canadian Formula One engineer. He is the Principal Engineer at the Racing Bulls Formula One team.

== Career ==
Rangen began his motorsport career in the early 2000s after graduating in mechanical engineering from the University of Calgary. He worked in junior engineering and race team roles with Gelles Racing between 2003 and 2005, initially as lead mechanic before progressing to race engineer and team manager. He then moved into Formula One with Super Aguri F1, where he worked in research and development and trackside aerodynamics analysis.

In 2008, Rangen moved to McLaren Racing as a design engineer, contributing to mechanical design projects during a period that included multiple race-winning campaigns. After nearly seven years at McLaren, he joined Scuderia Toro Rosso in 2015 as Design Office Co-ordinator, helping manage the integration of mechanical design groups.

He was later promoted to Chief Designer – Mechanical and Systems at Toro Rosso which later transitioned into Scuderia AlphaTauri, overseeing the development of key mechanical architectures including suspension, hydraulics, and power-unit integration. In this role he managed multidisciplinary engineering teams responsible for translating aerodynamic and regulatory concepts into manufacturable race-car systems.

In 2023, Rangen transitioned into a broader technical planning position as Principal Engineer – Engineering Strategy, focusing on long-term vehicle architecture, development pathways, and cross-departmental coordination. He continued this role after moving into the Racing Bulls Formula One Team structure in 2024.
