= Jody Egginton =

British engineer

- Born: 28 January 1974 (age 52); Coventry, United Kingdom
- Occupation: Engineer
- Years active: 2005–2025
- Employer: Red Bull Advanced Technologies
- Known for: Formula One engineer
- Title: Engineering Director

Jody Egginton (born 28 January 1974) is a British Formula One engineer who currently serves as the Engineering Director at Red Bull Advanced Technologies and was formerly the technical director at the RB Formula One Team.

== Career ==
Egginton started his career in motorsport at the Tyrrell F1 team as a Junior Designer in 1996, for a one-year stint at the team. He subsequently went on to work for Xtrac as a Gearbox Design Engineer before moving to Germany to work for Opel Team Holzer as a Design, Race, and Test Team Engineer, where he spent the following five years. Egginton momentarily worked for Aston Martin Racing as a Race & Design Engineer before returning to Formula One as a Race Engineer with Midland F1 which evolved into Spyker and later Force India. During his time he was the race engineer to Christijan Albers, Sakon Yamamoto and Giancarlo Fisichella.

In 2010, Egginton left the Silverstone outfit and joined the fledging Team Lotus as Chief Engineer. Two years later he was promoted to Operations Director, a position he held for another two years until he joined Scuderia Toro Rosso as its Head of Vehicle Performance in 2014. Three years later, Egginton was promoted to Deputy Technical Director and afterwards to Technical Director as the team became Scuderia AlphaTauri. Egginton spends his time working between the two factories in Faenza and Bicester, having overall technical responsibility for all technical and car performance activities.

In March 2025, it was announced that Egginton would depart as Racing Bull's Technical Director at the end of the month, moving to Red Bull Advanced Technologies as Engineering Director. His duties would be covered by Chief Technical Officer Tim Goss and Deputy Technical Directors Guillaume Cattelani and Andrea Landi.
