= Paolo Marabini =

Italian engineer

- Citizenship: Italian
- Education: University of Bologna
- Occupation: Engineer
- Years active: 1995-present
- Employer: Racing Bulls
- Title: Chief Designer

Paolo Marabini is an Italian Formula One engineer. He is the chief designer at the Racing Bulls Formula One team.

== Career ==
Marabini graduated in mechanical engineering from the University of Bologna. He began his Formula One career with Minardi in the mid-1990s as a stress engineer, later becoming Chief Engineer for Structures and Calculations. In this role he was responsible for structural design, analysis, and validation of the team’s chassis during a period defined by limited resources but high engineering efficiency.

Following the transformation of Minardi into Scuderia Toro Rosso in 2006, Marabini became Head of R&D and Structures, overseeing composite design, structural development, and research programmes. At the start of 2014, he was appointed Chief Designer – Composite and Structures, leading the conception and integration of chassis structures and materials technology across multiple generations of the team’s cars.

As the Faenza outfit evolved into Scuderia AlphaTauri and subsequently Racing Bulls, Marabini continued in senior design roles, including Chief Designer for Current Car projects before being promoted to overall Chief Designer. His work has focused on structural architecture, composite performance, and translating aerodynamic and mechanical requirements into manufacturable race-car designs.
