= Guillaume Dezoteux =

French Formula One engineer

- Occupation: Engineer
- Employer: Scuderia Ferrari
- Known for: Formula One engineer
- Title: Head of Performance operations

Guillaume Dezoteux is a French Formula One engineer. He is currently the Head of Performance Operations for the Scuderia Ferrari Formula One team.

== Career ==
Dezoteux graduated as an engineer in automotive engineering from ESTACA (École Supérieure des Techniques Aéronautiques et de Construction Automobile). He began his career in Formula One with Scuderia Toro Rosso in 2006 as a control systems engineer, later moving into performance engineering roles within the race team. During this period he contributed to vehicle dynamics analysis and simulation work supporting car development.

In 2011 he joined Michelin as a tyre performance engineer, working on competition tyre analysis and trackside support before returning to Toro Rosso in 2013. Back at Faenza, Dezoteux took on increasing responsibility, becoming Head of Simulation and Tyres and later Chief Engineer – Vehicle Performance, overseeing correlation between simulation tools, tyre usage and on-track behaviour.

From 2017 to 2016 he served as Head of Vehicle Performance, a role he continued through the team’s transition from Toro Rosso to Scuderia AlphaTauri and then to Racing Bulls, leading the department responsible for car performance analysis, simulator methodology, and race-weekend engineering support.

In January 2026 Dezoteaux moved to Ferrari as Head of Performance Operations.
