= 2008 Monaco Grand Prix =

Formula One motor race

Coordinates: 43°44′5″N 7°25′14″E

Race 6 of 18 in the 2008 Formula One World Championship
← Previous race	Next race →

Race details
- Date: 25 May 2008
- Official name: Formula 1 Grand Prix de Monaco 2008
- Location: Circuit de Monaco
- Course: Street circuit
- Course length: 3.34 km (2.08 miles)
- Distance: 76 laps, 253.84 km (158.08 miles)
- Scheduled distance: 78 laps, 260.52 km (162.24 miles)
- Weather: Wet, drying later.

Pole position
Driver	(Brazil) Felipe Massa	Ferrari
- Time: 1:15.787

Fastest lap
Driver	(Finland) Kimi Räikkönen	Ferrari
- Time: 1:16.689 on lap 74

Podium
First	(United Kingdom) Lewis Hamilton	McLaren-Mercedes
Second	(Poland) Robert Kubica	BMW Sauber
Third	(Brazil) Felipe Massa	Ferrari

The 2008 Monaco Grand Prix (formally the Formula 1 Grand Prix de Monaco 2008) was a Formula One motor race held on 25 May 2008 at the Circuit de Monaco; contested over 76 laps, it was the sixth race of the 2008 Formula One World Championship. The race was won by the season's eventual World Drivers' Champion, Lewis Hamilton, for the McLaren team. BMW Sauber driver Robert Kubica finished second, and Felipe Massa, who started from pole position, was third in a Ferrari.

Conditions were wet at the start of the race. Massa maintained his lead into the first corner, but his teammate Kimi Räikkönen was passed for second by Hamilton, who had started in third position on the grid. Hamilton suffered a punctured tyre on lap six, forcing him to make a pit stop from which he re-entered the race in fifth place. As the track dried and his rivals made their own pit stops Hamilton became the race leader, a position he held until the end of the race. Kubica's strategy allowed him to pass Massa during their second pit stops, after the latter's Ferrari was forced to change from wet to dry tyres. Räikkönen dropped back from fifth position to ninth after colliding with Adrian Sutil's Force India late in the race. Sutil had started from 18th on the grid and was in fourth position before the incident, which allowed Red Bull driver Mark Webber to finish fourth, ahead of Toro Rosso driver Sebastian Vettel in fifth.

The race was Hamilton's second win of the season, his first in Monaco, and the result meant that he led the Drivers' Championship, three points ahead of Räikkönen and four ahead of Massa. Ferrari maintained their lead in the World Constructors' Championship, 16 points ahead of McLaren and 17 ahead of BMW Sauber, with 12 races of the season remaining. It was McLaren's last win in Monaco until 2025.

== Background ==
The Grand Prix was contested by 20 drivers, in ten teams of two. The teams, also known as "constructors", were Ferrari, McLaren-Mercedes, Renault, Honda, Force India-Ferrari, BMW Sauber, Toyota, Red Bull-Renault, Williams-Toyota and Toro Rosso-Ferrari. Tyre supplier Bridgestone brought four different tyre types to the race: two dry-weather tyre compounds, the softer marked by a single white stripe down one of the grooves, and two wet-weather compounds, the extreme wet also marked by a single white stripe.

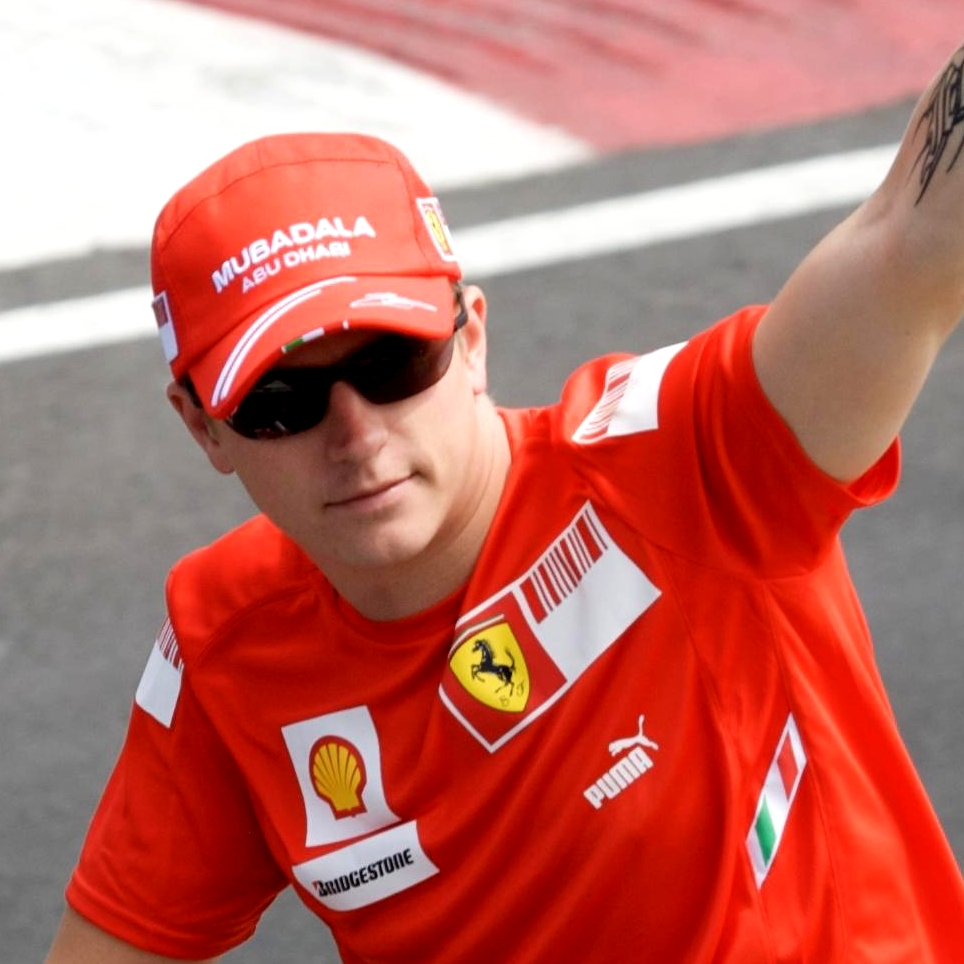
Ferrari driver Kimi Räikkönen said his team would have a competitive car for the Monaco circuit.

Before the race, Ferrari driver Kimi Räikkönen led the Drivers' Championship with 35 points, and his teammate Felipe Massa was second with 28 points. McLaren driver Lewis Hamilton was third, also on 28 points, with one win fewer than Massa; BMW driver Robert Kubica was fourth on 24 points, ahead of his teammate Nick Heidfeld on 20 points. In the Constructors' Championship, Ferrari were leading with 63 points, 19 points ahead of BMW Sauber, and 21 points ahead of McLaren-Mercedes.

Ferrari had responded to Hamilton's win in the opening round of the season in Australia by winning each of the subsequent four races, giving them a commanding lead in the Constructors' Championship. Ferrari's dominance had been highlighted by two one-two finishes: Massa ahead of Räikkönen in Bahrain and Räikkönen's win over Massa at the following round in Spain. A strong drive despite an unfavourable strategy had helped Hamilton to split the Ferrari drivers on the podium in Turkey, coming second, behind Massa but ahead of Räikkönen. Ferrari had not won in Monaco since 2001, and had been unable to match McLaren's pace in 2007. After tests at the Circuit Paul Ricard in mid-May, Räikkönen said his team had developed a strong car for the tight, low-speed Monaco circuit, but they still expected a challenge from McLaren and BMW Sauber. Hamilton claimed that McLaren would be competitive at Monaco, but Kubica played down his team's chances, saying "I think a win will be very difficult."

Toro Rosso's main 2008 car, the STR3, was also introduced that weekend; the team had used a modified version of their 2007 car, the STR2, for the opening five races. Originally due to be introduced at the previous race in Turkey, a crash in testing had left the team short of spare parts, delaying the car's race debut. As the STR3 used a different transmission than that used in the STR2, Toro Rosso driver Sebastian Vettel was forced to take a five-place penalty on the grid for an unscheduled change of gearbox. His teammate Sébastien Bourdais escaped a similar penalty because he had failed to finish the race in Turkey, allowing him a free gearbox change.

== Practice ==
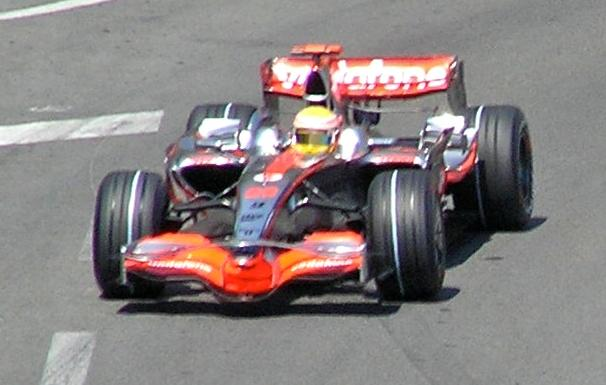
Lewis Hamilton during Thursday practice

Three practice sessions were held before the Sunday race – two on Thursday, and one on Saturday. The Thursday morning and afternoon sessions each lasted 90 minutes; the third session, on Saturday morning, lasted for an hour. One hour into the first session, officials noticed a loose drain cover in the run through Beau Rivage, and suspended practice. Ferrari and McLaren took the top four spots after the resumption – Räikkönen ahead of Hamilton, McLaren driver Heikki Kovalainen, and Massa. Behind Williams driver Nico Rosberg, Kubica was the best of the BMW Saubers in sixth; his teammate Heidfeld was forced to retire because of an engine failure, and stopped his car in Casino Square after just 13 laps. Despite further delays during the second session – both Renault drivers crashed in separate incidents at Sainte Devote, requiring the marshals to sweep the track of debris – Hamilton again proved strong, fastest ahead of Rosberg, Räikkönen, Massa, Kovalainen and Kubica. Apart from the Renault drivers, two more cars struck the barriers: Toyota driver Jarno Trulli scraped the wall out of Piscine; Adrian Sutil's Force India lost its front wing after tagging the barrier at Rascasse. While light rain fell on Saturday morning, Kovalainen set the fastest time in the final session, before losing control at Piscine and damaging the rear of his car. The rain increased as the marshals cleared the debris, and in the ensuing poor track conditions Kovalainen's time remained unbeaten. Hamilton managed second fastest, ahead of Räikkönen, Rosberg, Kubica and Massa.

== Qualifying ==
Saturday afternoon's qualifying session was divided into three parts. In the first 20-minute period, cars finishing 16th or lower were eliminated. The second qualifying period lasted for 15 minutes, at the end of which the fastest ten cars went into the final period, to determine their grid positions for the race. Cars failing to make the final period were allowed to be refuelled before the race but those competing in it were not, and so carried more fuel than they had done in the earlier qualifying sessions.

Incredible! I have got pole on a track where I have always struggled. Now I am beginning to like it a bit more ... I managed to do a perfect lap with a great car: this result shows that, if you work hard and with attention to detail, you can do it everywhere ... Starting at the front means I have the best possible conditions, but we will have to do everything perfectly. We worked a lot on the set-up to improve on the situation compared to past years and I think this decision has paid off.

— Felipe Massa, following the third qualifying session.

Massa clinched his third pole position of the season with a time of 1:15.787, and was joined on the front row by teammate Räikkönen. Hamilton took third place on the grid, with a qualifying time just 0.052 seconds slower than Massa's. Kovalainen edged out Kubica to take fourth, the latter struggling to get heat into his tyres for his final run. Rosberg's attacking style took him to sixth; Renault driver Fernando Alonso, Trulli and Red Bull driver Mark Webber occupied the next three places. Webber's teammate David Coulthard ended his second session in the barriers after the tunnel, after his car jerked sideways at the crest under braking. Although Coulthard was unhurt, the position of his stricken car and the subsequent caution flags surrounding it denied many drivers the opportunity to make their final flying laps in the session. Honda driver Jenson Button, who took 12th behind Timo Glock of Toyota, blamed the disruption for his performance, having prepared his car specifically for the final run. Heidfeld suffered from similar tyre problems to his teammate and managed 13th; Williams driver Kazuki Nakajima and Honda driver Rubens Barrichello took the next two places ahead of Bourdais in the new STR3. Renault driver Nelson Piquet Jr. lined up from 17th and Vettel managed 18th before his gearbox penalty demoted him to 19th. The Force Indias of Sutil and Giancarlo Fisichella qualified slowest; Fisichella's penalty for a change of gearbox after morning practice meant he started from 20th on the grid.

=== Qualifying classification ===
Pos	No	Driver	Constructor	Q1	Q2	Q3	Grid
1	2	(Brazil) Felipe Massa	Ferrari	1:15.190	1:15.110	1:15.787	1
2	1	(Finland) Kimi Räikkönen	Ferrari	1:15.717	1:15.404	1:15.815	2
3	22	(United Kingdom) Lewis Hamilton	McLaren-Mercedes	1:15.582	1:15.322	1:15.839	3
4	23	(Finland) Heikki Kovalainen	McLaren-Mercedes	1:15.295	1:15.389	1:16.165	4
5	4	(Poland) Robert Kubica	BMW Sauber	1:15.977	1:15.483	1:16.171	5
6	7	(Germany) Nico Rosberg	Williams-Toyota	1:15.935	1:15.287	1:16.548	6
7	5	(Spain) Fernando Alonso	Renault	1:16.646	1:15.827	1:16.852	7
8	11	(Italy) Jarno Trulli	Toyota	1:16.306	1:15.598	1:17.203	8
9	10	(Australia) Mark Webber	Red Bull-Renault	1:16.074	1:15.745	1:17.343	9
10	9	(United Kingdom) David Coulthard	Red Bull-Renault	1:16.086	1:15.839	No time^{1}	15^{2}
11	12	(Germany) Timo Glock	Toyota	1:16.285	1:15.907		10
12	16	(United Kingdom) Jenson Button	Honda	1:16.259	1:16.101		11
13	3	(Germany) Nick Heidfeld	BMW Sauber	1:16.650	1:16.455		12
14	8	(Japan) Kazuki Nakajima	Williams-Toyota	1:16.756	1:16.479		13
15	17	(Brazil) Rubens Barrichello	Honda	1:16.208	1:16.537		14
16	14	(France) Sébastien Bourdais	Toro Rosso-Ferrari	1:16.806			16
17	6	(Brazil) Nelson Piquet Jr.	Renault	1:16.933			17
18	15	(Germany) Sebastian Vettel	Toro Rosso-Ferrari	1:16.955			19^{2}
19	20	(Germany) Adrian Sutil	Force India-Ferrari	1:17.225			18
20	21	(Italy) Giancarlo Fisichella	Force India-Ferrari	1:17.823			20^{2}

Notes

- ^1 – David Coulthard failed to set a time in Q3 following an accident at the end of Q2.
- ^2 – David Coulthard, Sebastian Vettel and Giancarlo Fisichella were each given five place grid penalties for changing their gearboxes.

== Race ==
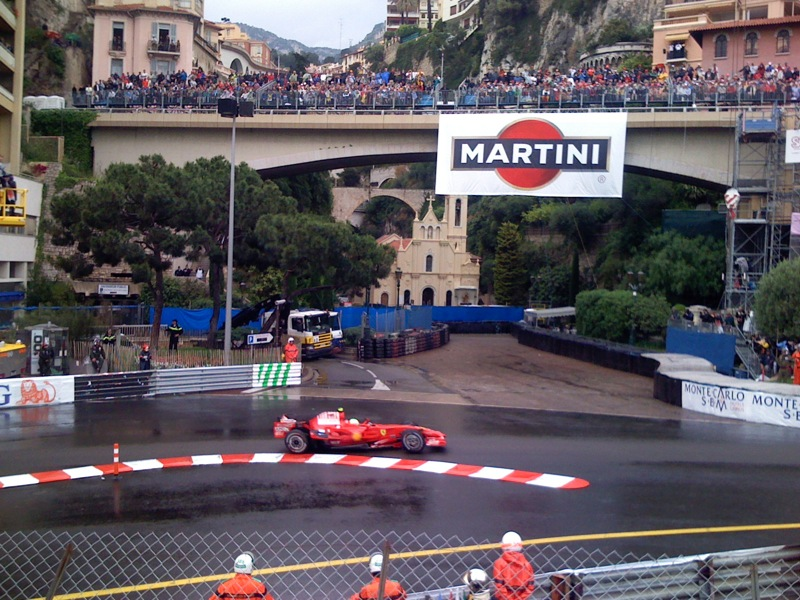
Felipe Massa drives through Sainte-Dévote

On Sunday morning Coulthard became the third driver to incur a gearbox penalty, after changing his transmission following his crash during qualifying. The penalty moved him from 10th to 15th on the grid. In contrast to Saturday's dry qualifying session, frequent showers soaked the track on Sunday morning, making racing slippery and potentially hazardous. Although the showers subsided by early afternoon, they resumed 20 minutes before the start, the changeable conditions forcing teams to delay tyre choices for as long as possible. By the time of the three-minute warning most drivers had opted for the standard wet tyre; only Piquet started the race on the extreme wet. Kovalainen's engine stalled as the cars set off on their formation lap; his car was pushed back to the pit lane by his mechanics, where it was restarted and a new steering wheel fitted to solve the problem.

Massa held his lead into the first corner at Sainte Devote, while behind him Hamilton used the pit lane exit to pass Räikkönen down the inside. Kovalainen's vacated fourth position was filled by Kubica, as Alonso moved into fifth, passing Rosberg. The latter made a pit stop soon after for a new front wing after making contact with Alonso at the hairpin, promoting Trulli to sixth. These positions were maintained for several laps, but the distances between the cars increased, in part because the spray thrown up by their wheels made close racing difficult. The conditions proved to be crucial when Hamilton made contact with barriers on the outside of Tabac on lap six, necessitating his return to the pit lane for a new set of tyres. The McLaren mechanics fuelled the car for a longer second stint and Hamilton emerged in fifth, the distances between his competitors' cars resulting in him losing only three places during the pit stop. Alonso had a similar accident to Hamilton's at Massenet two laps later, and emerged in seventh after pitting and taking on extreme wets.

Massa's lead – 12 seconds over the second-placed Räikkönen by lap six – was reduced to nothing when the safety car was deployed on the eighth lap. Coulthard and Bourdais had crashed into the barriers at Massenet just seconds apart, requiring the marshals to separate the cars and lift them off the track. When the safety car pulled off after three laps, Massa consolidated his lead over his teammate. Räikkönen, however, was called into the pit lane for a drive-through penalty after to failing to have his tyres attached by the three-minute warning before the race, dropping him back to fourth. Kubica, now second, took the lead when Massa slid off down the escape road at Sainte Devote, the undamaged Ferrari rejoining in second as the rain eased. The two swapped positions again after their pit stops – Kubica on lap 26 and Massa on lap 33 – but Hamilton, carrying more fuel than his rivals, took the lead.

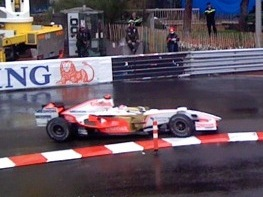
Adrian Sutil early in the race

As a dry line appeared on the track, Hamilton extended his lead over Massa, from 13 to 37 seconds, by the time he made a pit stop for the second time on lap 54. His timing proved fortunate, as he changed to dry tyres just as such a strategy emerged as the strongest, and he emerged 13 seconds ahead of Massa. The Ferrari's own pit stop two laps later dropped Massa behind Kubica. Hamilton's lead was reduced when the safety car once again deployed on lap 62 after Rosberg crashed at Piscine, hitting both sides of the track and scattering debris. Rosberg was unhurt.

Of the 20 cars which started the race, Sutil had gained the most places by the second safety car period. The Force India started from 18th, rose one place after Kovalainen was pushed back to the pit lane, passed Piquet on the second lap and Bourdais a lap later. Sutil benefited as Button, Rosberg, Glock and Trulli made pit stops for repairs over the following laps, to sit in 11th by lap 14. Alonso, on extreme wet tyres behind Heidfeld, attempted to pass the BMW at the hairpin, but succeeded only in damaging his front wing and forming a stationary queue behind him. He also benefitted by overtaking three cars under yellow flags and would have been penalised if he had finished the race. Sutil took advantage of the situation and passed four cars to take seventh, behind Heidfeld and Webber. Running a long first stint until lap 53, he moved to fourth as the cars ahead of him made pit stops. Vettel gained 12 places from the start, battling with Barrichello and Nakajima early on before jumping several places on his first stint as his rivals made pit stops, eventually switching to dry tyres when he stopped on lap 52. Webber improved three places from the start to sit in sixth, ahead of Vettel, Barrichello and Nakajima.

The safety car was withdrawn on lap 68. Later on the same lap, Räikkönen lost control of his car under braking out of the tunnel, and by the time he regained control his speed was too great to avoid a collision with Sutil. The Ferrari damaged its front wing and made a pit stops for a replacement before resuming, but the damage to Sutil's rear suspension led to his retirement. Webber benefited from the incident and moved to fourth place, while Räikkönen dropped back to ninth.

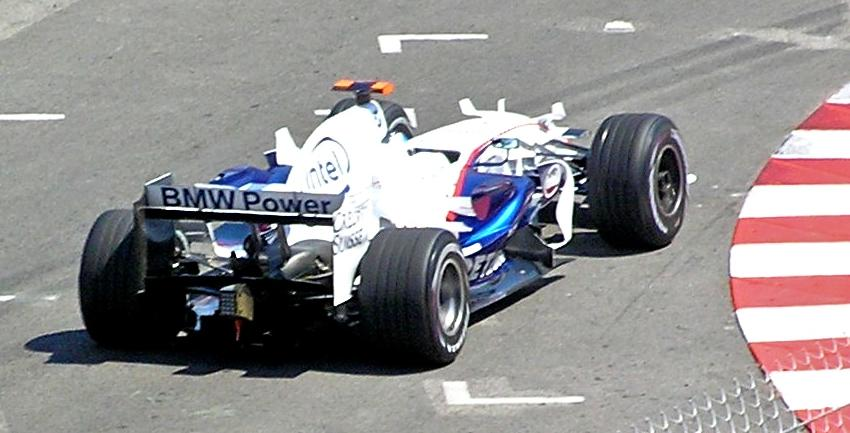
Nick Heidfeld finished the race four laps behind race winner Lewis Hamilton.

The slow pace during the opening laps meant the race ended after two hours, or 76 laps, rather than the 78 laps originally scheduled. Hamilton, despite suffering a slow puncture on the final lap, crossed the finish line to take his first win in Monaco. Kubica followed in second, ahead of Massa and Webber. Vettel took the STR3 to its first points in its maiden race, coming fifth, ahead of Barrichello and Nakajima. Kovalainen recovered from his stall to finish eighth, one place ahead of Räikkönen, who set the fastest lap of the race on lap 74, a 1:16.689. He was followed by Alonso, Button, Glock and Trulli. Heidfeld was the last of the classified finishers, in 14th position, four laps behind Hamilton. Fisichella retired with a gearbox failure after 36 laps; Piquet – two laps after he switched to dry tyres on lap 46 – finished his race in the barriers at Sainte Devote. Sutil, Rosberg, Coulthard and Bourdais were the four other retirements.

=== Post-race ===
This has got to be the highlight of my career and I am sure it will continue to be the highlight for the rest of my life. I remember on the last few laps I was just thinking that Ayrton Senna won here a lot of times and to win here would be amazing ... [From] the last corner onwards, I was screaming my head off basically, making sure the radio was off, but just so happy that I was able to pull it off.

— Lewis Hamilton, speaking after the race.

The top three finishers appeared in Prince Albert II of Monaco's Royal box to collect their trophies. In the subsequent press conference Hamilton said that conditions early in the race made driving difficult: "When the weather is like this, when it starts to rain and we had an idea it was going to start to dry, the important thing is to keep it on the track but I can't explain how difficult it was for all of us. You were aquaplaning all the time and you were tip-toeing almost." Hamilton also said that his crash at Tabac had been the result of a stream of water running over the track, causing his car to oversteer and resulting in a puncture to his right rear tyre. Nevertheless, he praised his team and strategy for helping him take the victory. Kubica said that tyre problems in his middle stint meant he was unable to overtake Massa, who was driving a heavier car. Noticing Glock's success on dry tyres, Kubica asked his team to make a similar change, resulting in his pass on Massa. During the post-race interview Massa said that although he was fuelled to the end of the race after his first pit stop, the drying track forced him to pit again for new tyres: "It was a shame that we made a little mistake on the strategy but it is good to be on the podium."

Sutil expressed his disappointment after being knocked out of the race when he was on course to record his team's first points:

I can't believe it, it was so close. It feels like a pain in my heart. It is like a dream gone to a nightmare – suddenly you are in the car and it looks all fantastic, then you have to accept it is not going to happen ... It was after the restart after the final safety car that Kimi had a problem under braking and crashed into the back of my car. The race was over and it was a real shock. A few tears came out as the adrenaline was high – I just can't explain it.

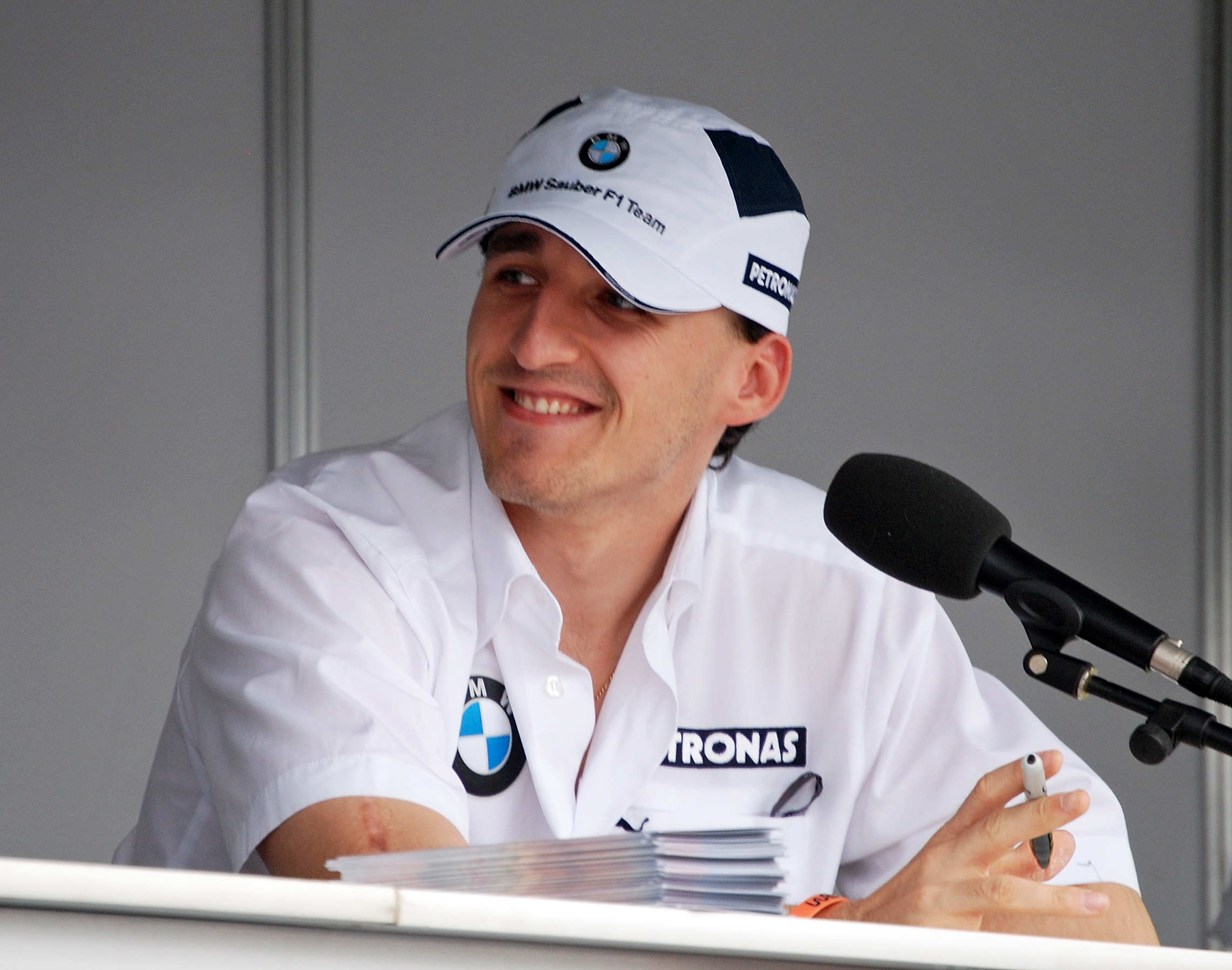
Robert Kubica finished second and credited his strategy for his performance.

Räikkönen apologised to Sutil for their collision, blaming cold brakes for his loss of control. Mike Gascoyne, Force India's technical chief, called for the stewards to investigate the incident, but after deliberation no action was taken. "The frustration is that if that was a Force India driver hitting a world champion we'd expect to get a one or two-race ban, but the other way round nothing ever seems to happen" said Gascoyne. Sutil was called to the stewards' room and reprimanded for passing three cars under yellow flags on lap 13. Because he had retired, he was issued with merely a warning, but had he finished the race he would have been given a 25-second time penalty, which would have dropped him out of the point-scoring positions.

Hamilton's win was praised by Jackie Stewart, a three-time winner of the Monaco Grand Prix. "At his age, Lewis can win this race many times," he said. "This is the first, I hope, of many victories for him in Monaco so that he can join the greats of Formula One." Damon Hill, the 1996 World Champion, said Hamilton "did very well indeed. I was most impressed, and the race as a whole was also a great advertisement for what F1 should be about." McLaren would not win the race again until 2025, when Lando Norris took victory from pole position ahead of Ferrari’s Charles Leclerc. The race result left Hamilton leading the Drivers' Championship with 38 points. Räikkönen, who failed to score in Monaco, was second on 35 points, one point ahead of Massa and three ahead of Kubica. Heidfeld was sixth on 20 points. In the Constructors' Championship, Ferrari maintained their lead with 69 points, McLaren jumped to second on 53 points, and BMW Sauber dropped to third on 52 points, with 12 races of the season remaining.

=== Race classification ===
Pos	No	Driver	Constructor	Laps	Time/Retired	Grid	Points
1	22	(United Kingdom) Lewis Hamilton	McLaren-Mercedes	76	2:00:42.742	3	10
2	4	(Poland) Robert Kubica	BMW Sauber	76	+3.064	5	8
3	2	(Brazil) Felipe Massa	Ferrari	76	+4.811	1	6
4	10	(Australia) Mark Webber	Red Bull-Renault	76	+19.295	9	5
5	15	(Germany) Sebastian Vettel	Toro Rosso-Ferrari	76	+24.657	19	4
6	17	(Brazil) Rubens Barrichello	Honda	76	+28.408	14	3
7	8	(Japan) Kazuki Nakajima	Williams-Toyota	76	+30.180	13	2
8	23	(Finland) Heikki Kovalainen	McLaren-Mercedes	76	+33.191	PL^{3}	1
9	1	(Finland) Kimi Räikkönen	Ferrari	76	+33.792	2	
10	5	(Spain) Fernando Alonso	Renault	75	+1 Lap	7	
11	16	(United Kingdom) Jenson Button	Honda	75	+1 Lap	11	
12	12	(Germany) Timo Glock	Toyota	75	+1 Lap	10	
13	11	(Italy) Jarno Trulli	Toyota	75	+1 Lap	8	
14	3	(Germany) Nick Heidfeld	BMW Sauber	72	+4 Laps	12	
Ret	20	(Germany) Adrian Sutil	Force India-Ferrari	67	Collision damage	18	
Ret	7	(Germany) Nico Rosberg	Williams-Toyota	59	Accident	6	
Ret	6	(Brazil) Nelson Piquet Jr.	Renault	47	Accident	17	
Ret	21	(Italy) Giancarlo Fisichella	Force India-Ferrari	36	Gearbox	20	
Ret	9	(United Kingdom) David Coulthard	Red Bull-Renault	7	Accident	15	
Ret	14	(France) Sébastien Bourdais	Toro Rosso-Ferrari	7	Collision	16	

Notes

- ^3 – Heikki Kovalainen started the race from the pitlane.

== Championship standings after the race ==
Drivers' Championship standings

+/−	Pos.	Driver	Points
2	1	(United Kingdom) Lewis Hamilton	38
1	2	(Finland) Kimi Räikkönen	35
1	3	(Brazil) Felipe Massa	34
	4	(Poland) Robert Kubica	32
	5	(Germany) Nick Heidfeld	20

Constructors' Championship standings

+/−	Pos.	Driver	Points
	1	(Italy) Ferrari	69
1	2	(United Kingdom) McLaren-Mercedes	53
1	3	(Germany) BMW Sauber	52
	4	(United Kingdom) Williams-Toyota	15
	5	(Austria) Red Bull-Renault	15

- Note: Only the top five positions are included for both sets of standings.

== See also ==
- 2008 Monaco GP2 Series round

Previous race: 2008 Turkish Grand Prix	FIA Formula One World Championship; 2008 season	Next race: 2008 Canadian Grand Prix
Previous race: 2007 Monaco Grand Prix	Monaco Grand Prix	Next race: 2009 Monaco Grand Prix
