= Toro Rosso STR2 =

Formula One racing car

Toro Rosso STR2 Toro Rosso STR2B
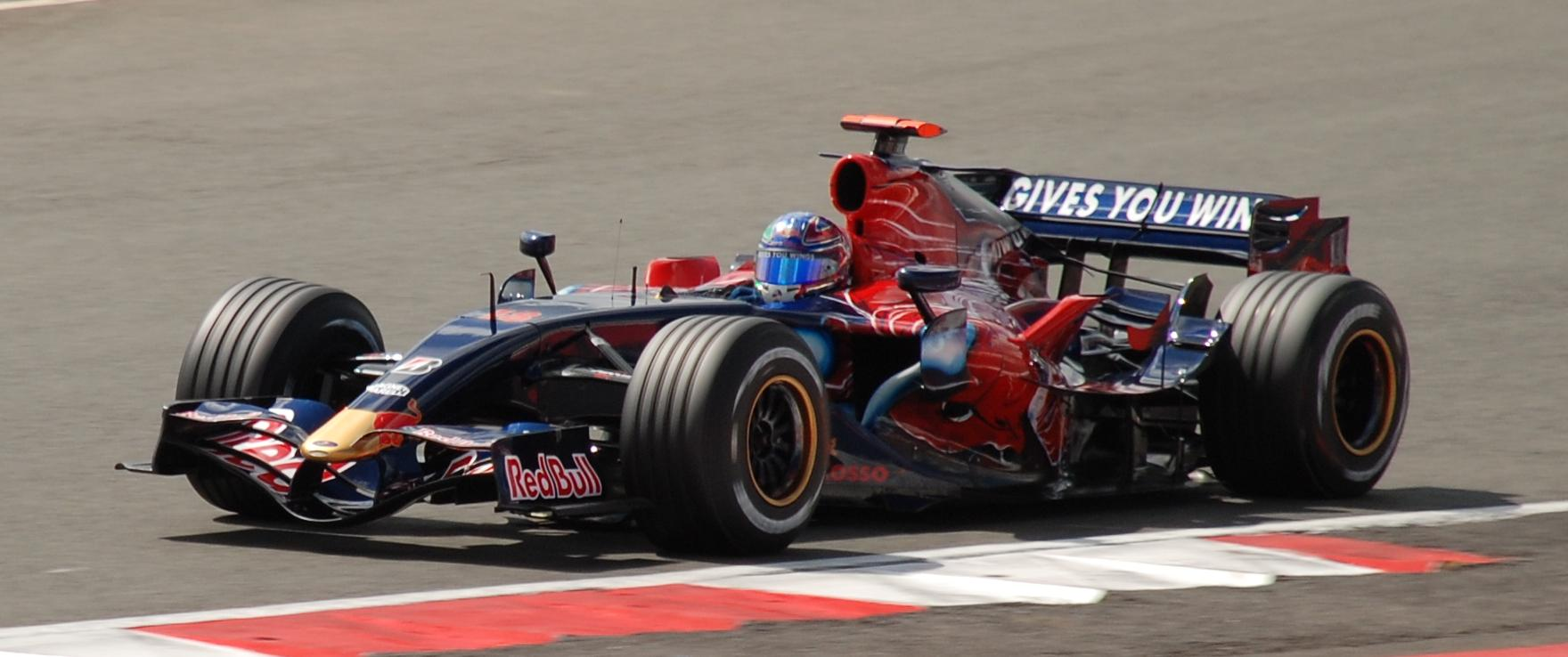
- Vitantonio Liuzzi driving the STR2 during the 2007 British Grand Prix
- Category: Formula One
- Constructor: Toro Rosso
- Designers: Alex Hitzinger (Technical Director); Adrian Newey (Chief Technical Officer - Red Bull); Mark Smith (Technical Director - Red Bull); Rob Marshall (Chief Designer - Red Bull); Alessandro Poggi (Head of Electronics); Peter Prodromou (Head of Aerodynamics - Red Bull)
- Predecessor: STR1
- Successor: STR3

Technical specifications
- Chassis: carbon-fibre and honeycomb composite structure
- Suspension (front): cast titanium uprights, pushrods, carbon-fibre upper and lower wishbones
- Suspension (rear): cast titanium uprights, pushrods, carbon-fibre upper and lower wishbones
- Engine: Ferrari 056 (2006-spec in 2007, 2007-spec in early 2008) 2398cc V8, 19,000 RPM Limited
- Transmission: 7-speed sequential longitudinally mounted high-pressure hydraulic system for power shift and clutch operation AP Racing triple-plate-type clutch
- Fuel: Shell
- Tyres: Bridgestone Potenza; AVUS Racing Front: 12.0 to 12.7in x 13in Wheels; AVUS Racing Rear: 13.7in x 13in Wheels

Competition history
- Notable entrants: Scuderia Toro Rosso
- Notable drivers: 18. (Italy) Vitantonio Liuzzi; 19. (United States) Scott Speed; 19./15. (Germany) Sebastian Vettel; 14. (France) Sébastien Bourdais
- Debut: 2007 Australian Grand Prix
- Last event: 2008 Turkish Grand Prix
Races	Wins	Podiums	Poles	F/Laps
22	0	0	0	0

The Toro Rosso STR2 is the car with which the Scuderia Toro Rosso team competed in the 2007 Formula One season. It was unveiled on 13 February 2007 at the Circuit de Catalunya. The car is, controversially, a variant of the Red Bull RB3 chassis (although powered by a Ferrari instead of a Renault engine). It was initially driven by Vitantonio Liuzzi and Scott Speed, until Speed was replaced by Sebastian Vettel at the Hungaroring for the remainder of the season. The car in a modified form was also used to compete in the first five races of the 2008 Formula One season. The modified car was driven by Sébastien Bourdais, four-consecutive-time Champ Car winner, and Vettel. The STR2 was the first-ever Toro Rosso F1 car to use the mandatory 90-degree Formula One V8 engine configuration but Toro Rosso opted for the 2006-spec Ferrari 056 instead of the 2007-spec because of the 1-year old Toro Rosso customer engine policy and as a cost-saving measure.

The STR2 was the first Faenza-based Formula One car to utilize Ferrari engine since the Minardi M191 in 1991 and the first V8-powered Faenza-based Formula One car since the Minardi M197 in 1997.

== Customer car protests ==
Spyker and Williams before and throughout the season repeatedly stated their belief that the STR2 was in fact identical to the Red Bull RB3. Central to their objection was their belief that the Concorde Agreement clearly requires all teams to construct their own individual chassis. Both teams threatened legal action over the possible breach of regulations, particularly Colin Kolles, the Spyker team principal.

== Launch ==
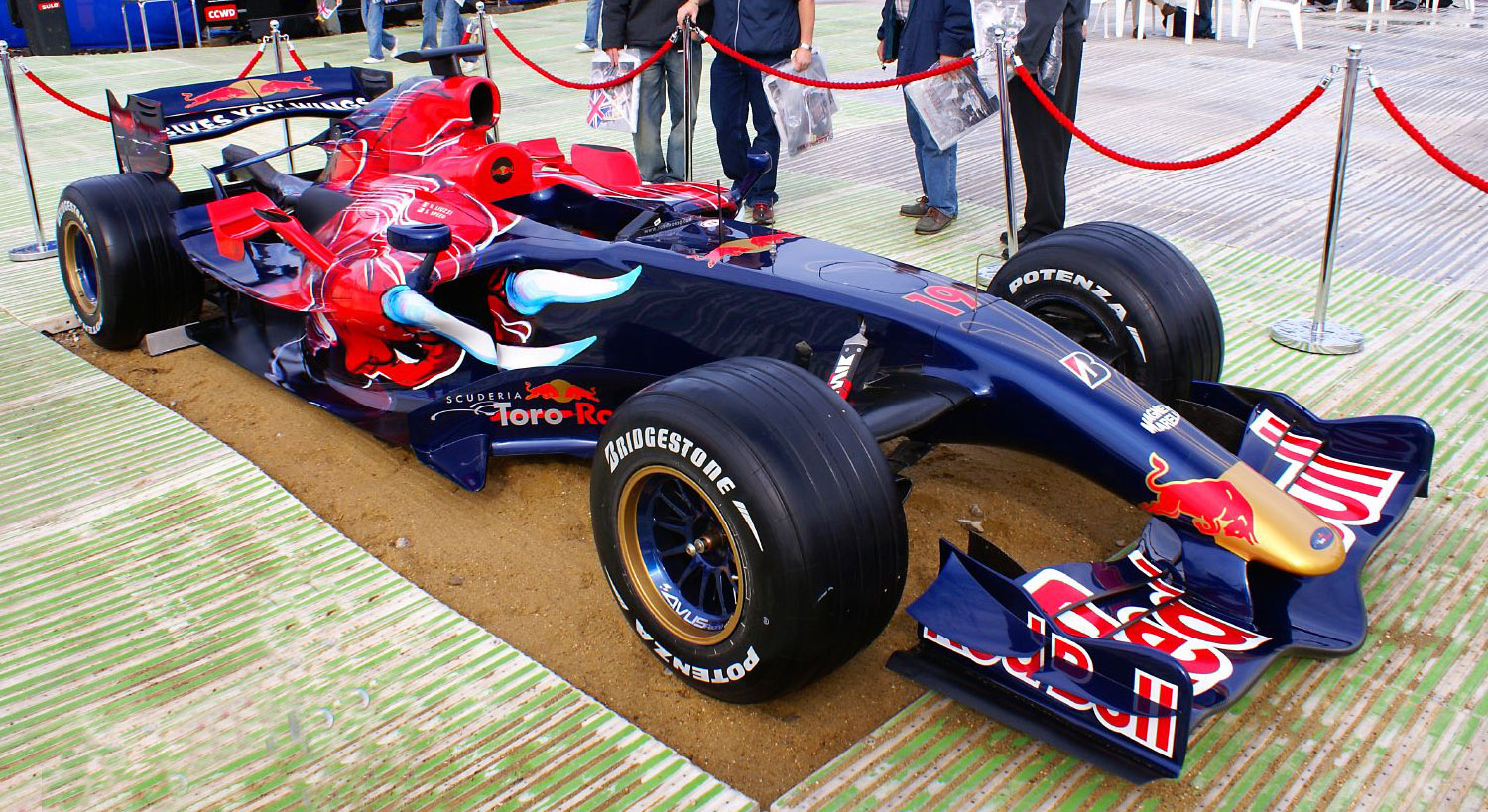
A STR2 at the 2007 Red Bull Air Race London.

The car was launched in a low key event on a test day at the Circuit de Catalunya on 13 February 2007, and immediately attracted the expected controversy when photos were released. There was a pre-event fear of the car not being ready but work through the previous night by the mechanics ensured that it was unveiled on time. Liuzzi was confirmed as one of the team's drivers at the launch but the announcement of his teammate was delayed due to 'contractual issues'. Scott Speed, who partnered Liuzzi at the team in 2006, was believed to be the most likely choice, and his re-appointment was later confirmed. The car itself was, as explained, a development version of Red Bull Racing's RB3. The Red Bull RB3 was designed by Adrian Newey, who earned a reputation as one of the most successful F1 designers with Championship-winning cars at both Williams and McLaren. In order for Red Bull Racing and Toro Rosso to use the chassis, Newey was employed by 'new' consortium named Red Bull Technology. This provided a loop-hole for STR around the prohibition of chassis sharing, as both teams were legally using a car developed by an 'independent' third party. Team Principal Franz Tost commented at the launch that "We are quite optimistic, I think we can make a step forward with the new car and the new engine. We have one very experienced driver and the second we will see [...] Therefore it is becoming better and better and we expect a quite successful season."

== STR2 and STR2B development ==
=== 2007 STR2 car development ===
Generally the STR2 and RB3 received aerodynamic revisions at different stages through the season. The STR2 was fitted with a new front wing in Monaco, similar to the one that sister team Red Bull implemented in the previous round, with 2 curved upper profiles that improve airflow over the car and increase downforce. The team further developed the STR2 in Turkey with a new barge board development. The STR2 was fitted with a "arch" over the nose on the front wing around the Italian Grand Prix, the Red Bull RB3s did not sport such a wing design until around the Japanese Grand Prix.

=== 2008 STR2B car development ===
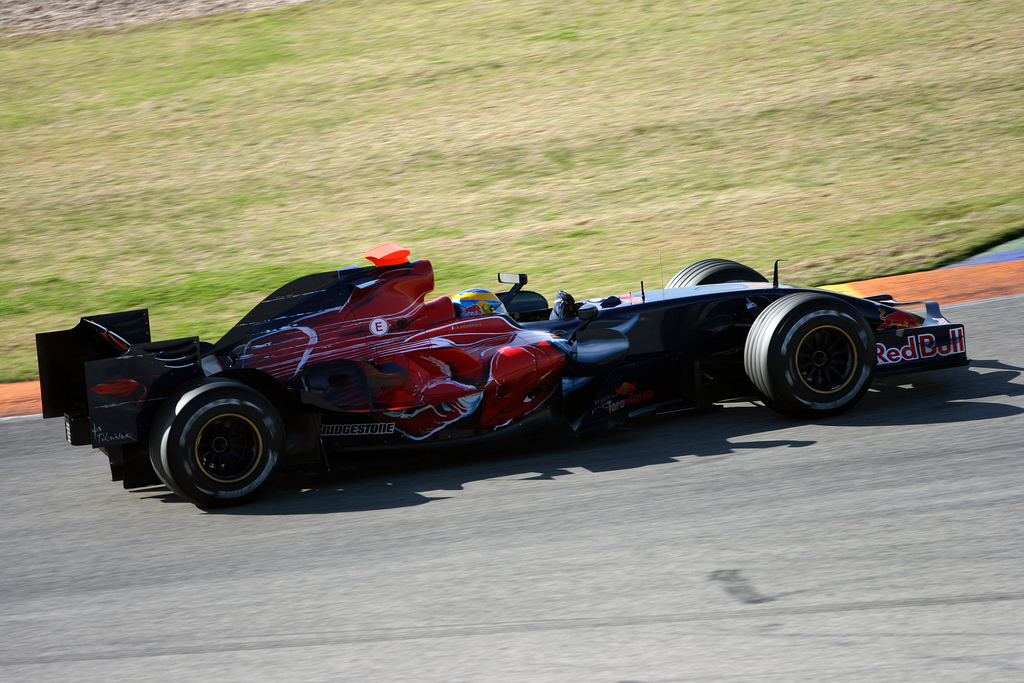
An STR2B driven by Sébastien Bourdais at Valencia in January 2008.

The STR2 was developed further to include the new McLaren Electronic Systems "Standardised Electronic Control Unit" that prevented the cars having electronic driver aids like engine braking and traction control. The car was also adapted for the new rules on driver safety with higher headrests around the cockpit. Another development was a new gearbox, as the 2008 rules stated that cars must have a gearbox that lasts for four races: if one failed, the driver faced a penalty of five places on the starting grid. The STR2B car was utilized 2007-spec Ferrari 056 engine rather than 2008.

The STR2B underwent a total re-working of the front suspension at the Barcelona test on 1–3 February, This was to make better use of the Bridgestone Potenza tyres, but also to clean up the area from the front wing to under the drivers seat, improving the efficiency of the rear diffuser, thus providing more grip.

== Competition history ==
=== 2007 season ===
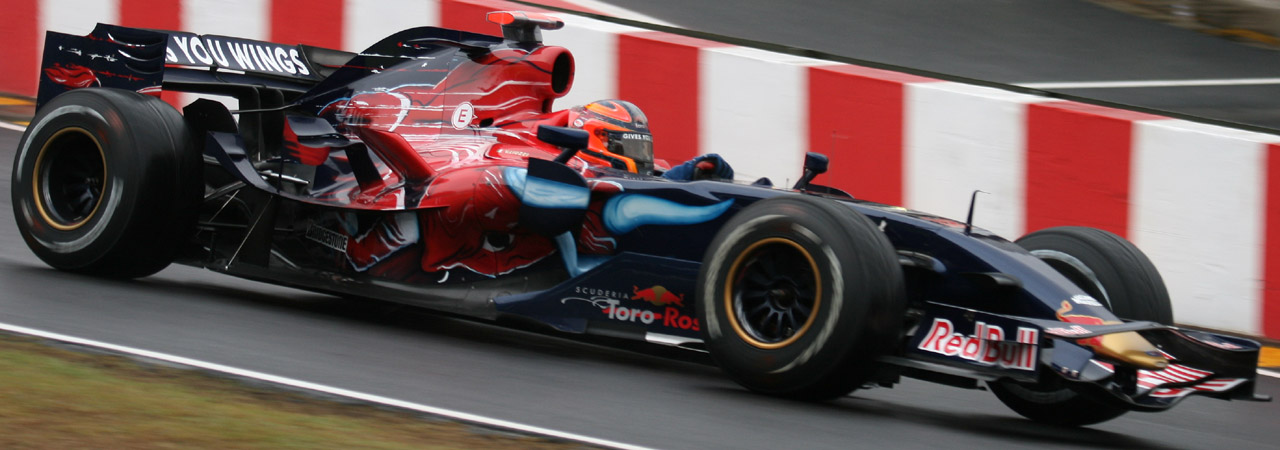
Liuzzi's STR2 during the 2007 Brazilian Grand Prix, the last race of the season. In the latter half of the season, the arch shaped wing was installed over the front wing and front nose.

The team's results during the season were generally poor compared to its rivals. For the first half of the season, the STR2 did not reach the level of competitiveness expected, especially when compared to the 'sister' Red Bull Racing team. The car's main weakness, which it shared with the RB3, was the new seamless shift gearbox, which frequently failed during races. Results did pick up slightly in the second half of the season, as both Red Bull Racing and Toro Rosso started to find more reliability with the car. A double points finish in China, with Vettel fourth and Liuzzi sixth, gave the team a total of eight world championship points. This gave Toro Rosso a 7th-place finish in the Constructors' Standings after the disqualification of McLaren.

=== 2008 season ===
The STR2Bs of Vettel and Bourdais failed to finish the 2008 Australian Grand Prix. Bourdais scored points, however, as he was classified in seventh position, albeit that while he did not finish the race he had completed 90% of the race distance. However, at the 2008 Malaysian Grand Prix both cars failed to score any points; Bourdais spun off in the first lap and Vettel retired with an engine failure. Bourdais finished 15th at the 2008 Bahrain Grand Prix, while Vettel retired on the first lap with engine failure.

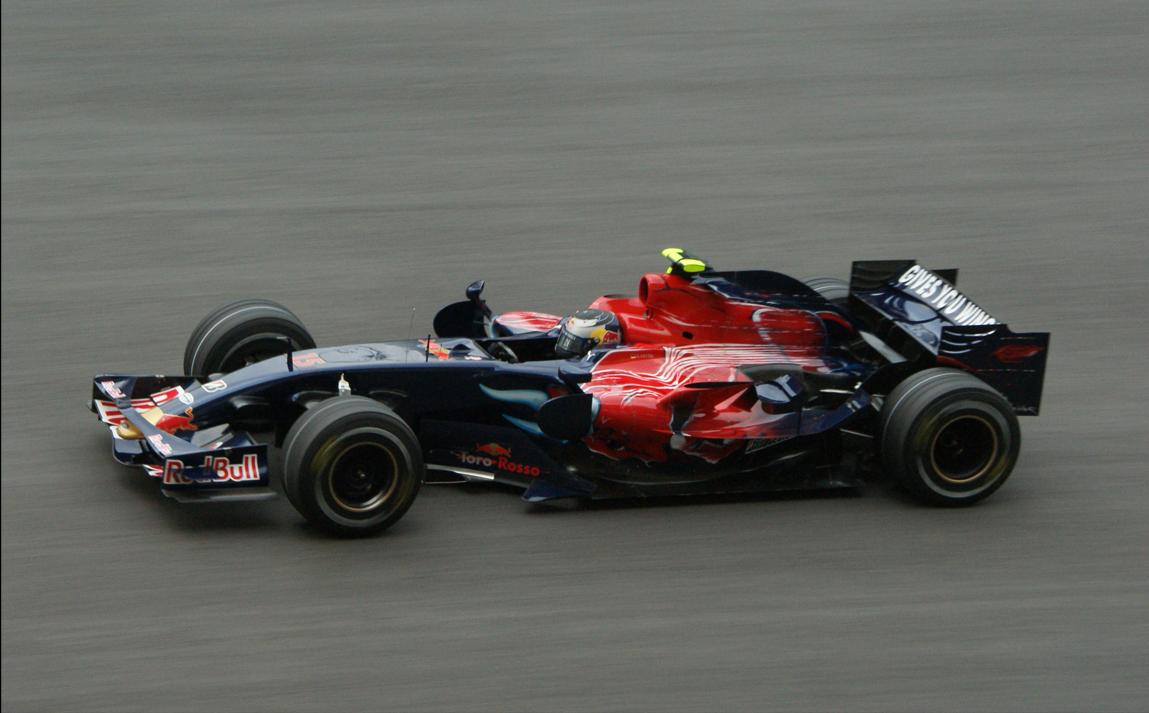
Vettel driving the STR2B at the 2008 Malaysian Grand Prix

Coming back to Europe for the start of the European season, Toro Rosso hoped that the STR2B would have its last race at the 2008 Spanish Grand Prix, with the STR3 being raced for the first time at the 2008 Turkish Grand Prix. The new car's debut was later delayed until the 2008 Monaco Grand Prix, as Chief Engineer Laurent Mekies, who would eventually become team principal of Toro Rosso's successor Racing Bulls and then Red Bull, stated that the team did not have enough parts to run the team in a professional manner over the weekend of the Turkish Grand Prix.

At the 2008 Spanish Grand Prix, both drivers again failed to finish the race, after they were involved in separate collisions in the opening laps; Force India driver Adrian Sutil hit Vettel on lap one, while Bourdais collided with Nelson Piquet Jr. on the second lap. Bourdais retired on the seventh lap due to suspension damage sustained in this coming together. Fortunes did not improve during the following round in Turkey, where Bourdais spun off the track and Vettel finished in 17th, and last, position after suffering a puncture in the opening laps.

== Complete Formula One results ==
(key)

Year	Entrant	Engine	Tyres	Drivers	1	2	3	4	5	6	7	8	9	10	11	12	13	14	15	16	17	18	Points	WCC
2007	Scuderia Toro Rosso	Ferrari V8	B		AUS	MAL	BHR	ESP	MON	CAN	USA	FRA	GBR	EUR	HUN	TUR	ITA	BEL	JPN	CHN	BRA		8	7th
2007	Scuderia Toro Rosso	Ferrari V8	B	(Italy) Vitantonio Liuzzi	14	17	Ret	Ret	Ret	Ret	17^{†}	Ret	16^{†}	Ret	Ret	15	17	12	9	6	13		8	7th
2007	Scuderia Toro Rosso	Ferrari V8	B	(United States) Scott Speed	Ret	14	Ret	Ret	9	Ret	13	Ret	Ret	Ret									8	7th
2007	Scuderia Toro Rosso	Ferrari V8	B	(Germany) Sebastian Vettel											16	19	18	Ret	Ret	4	Ret		8	7th
2008	Scuderia Toro Rosso	Ferrari V8	B		AUS	MAL	BHR	ESP	TUR	MON	CAN	FRA	GBR	GER	HUN	EUR	BEL	ITA	SIN	JPN	CHN	BRA	39*	6th
2008	Scuderia Toro Rosso	Ferrari V8	B	(France) Sébastien Bourdais	7^{†}	Ret	15	Ret	Ret														39*	6th
2008	Scuderia Toro Rosso	Ferrari V8	B	(Germany) Sebastian Vettel	Ret	Ret	Ret	Ret	17														39*	6th

* Only 2 points scored using the STR2B.

^{†} Did not finish the race but was classified as they completed more than 90% of the race distance.
