= Toro Rosso STR3 =

Formula One racing car

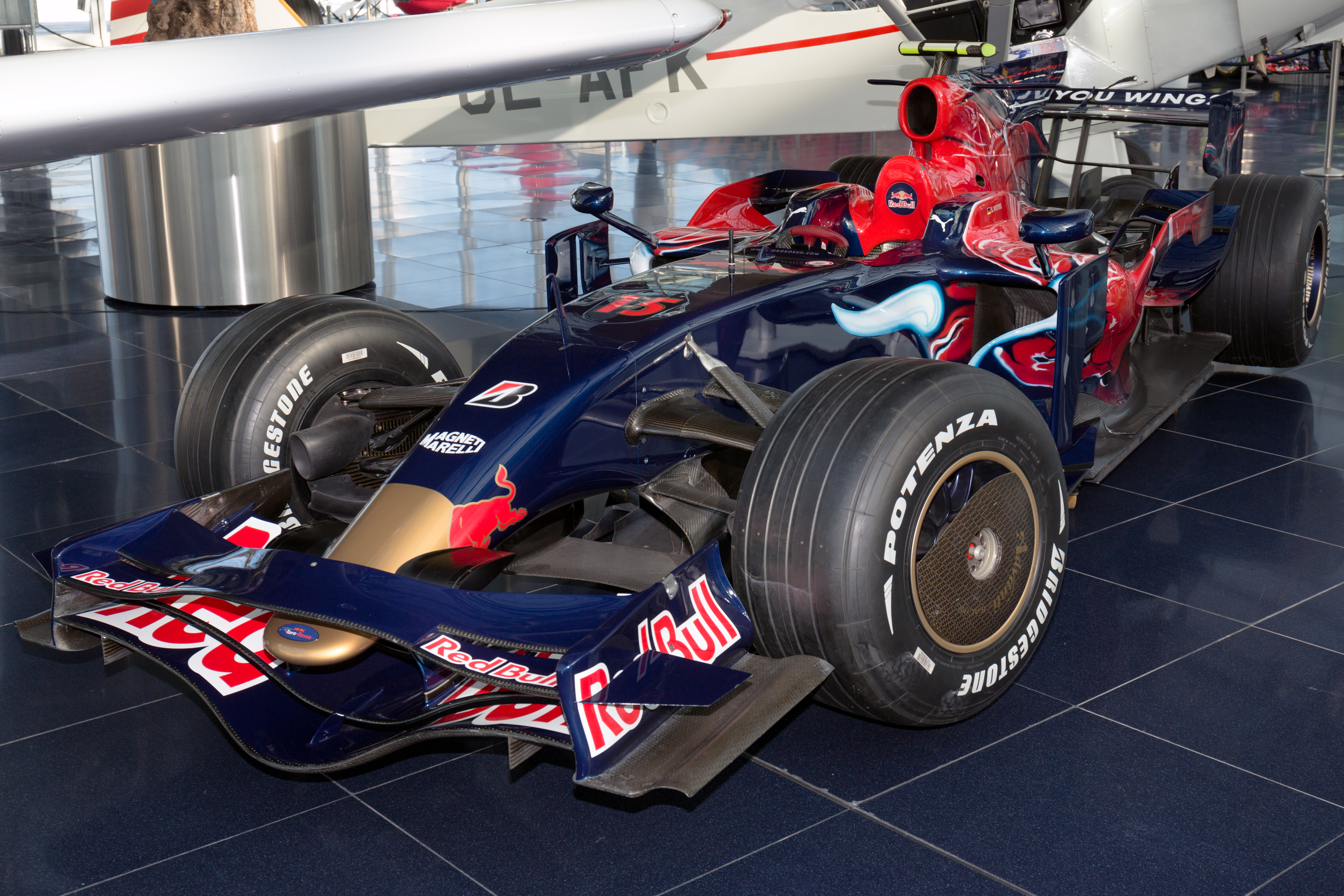
- The STR3 of Sebastian Vettel on display at the Hangar-7 in 2017
- Category: Formula One
- Constructor: Toro Rosso
- Designers: Giorgio Ascanelli (Technical Director); Adrian Newey (Chief Technical Officer - Red Bull); Geoff Willis (Technical Director - Red Bull); Rob Marshall (Chief Designer - Red Bull); Peter Prodromou (Head of Aerodynamics - Red Bull)
- Predecessor: STR2B
- Successor: STR4

Technical specifications
- Chassis: carbon-fibre and honeycomb composite structure
- Suspension (front): cast titanium uprights, pushrods, carbon-fibre upper and lower wishbones
- Suspension (rear): cast titanium uprights, pushrods, carbon-fibre upper and lower wishbones
- Engine: Ferrari 056 (2007-spec) 2398cc V8 19,000 RPM Limited
- Transmission: Ferrari 7-speed sequential with hydraulic actuation
- Fuel: Shell
- Tyres: Bridgestone Potenza; AVUS Racing Front: 12.0 to 12.7in x 13in Wheels; AVUS Racing Rear: 13.7in x 13in Wheels

Competition history
- Notable entrants: Scuderia Toro Rosso
- Notable drivers: 14. (France) Sébastien Bourdais; 15. (Germany) Sebastian Vettel
- Debut: 2008 Monaco Grand Prix
- First win: 2008 Italian Grand Prix
- Last win: 2008 Italian Grand Prix
- Last event: 2008 Brazilian Grand Prix
Races	Wins	Podiums	Poles	F/Laps
13	1	1	1	0

The Toro Rosso STR3 is a Formula One car which Scuderia Toro Rosso used in the second half of the 2008 Formula One season designed by Adrian Newey, the Red Bull Racing designer.

Sebastian Vettel, who (since joining Scuderia Toro Rosso) made it a habit to give his racing cars names, named his STR3 'Julie'.

== Overview ==
It was first tested by Red Bull junior driver, Brendon Hartley in Italy on 2 April and publicly launched on 16 April 2008 at the Circuit de Catalunya, where it was driven by Sébastien Bourdais.

Toro Rosso had started the 2008 season with an updated B specification version of their 2007 STR2 car, originally stating that the STR3 would make its début at the fourth or fifth round. From the Monaco Grand Prix onwards, both cars had a shark fin attached to the engine cover.

The car was first raced at the 6th round of the season, the Monaco Grand Prix, driven by Sébastien Bourdais and Sebastian Vettel. It was driven by Vettel to victory in the Italian Grand Prix, Vettel's first victory and the only victory for the team under the Toro Rosso name (the successor team identity, Scuderia AlphaTauri, achieved the team’s second victory with Pierre Gasly at the 2020 Italian Grand Prix). The Toro Rosso STR3 resembled the Renault-powered Red Bull RB4.

Toro Rosso finished sixth in the Constructors' Championship, scoring 39 points throughout the whole season - the team's best season since 1991 season under Minardi branding.

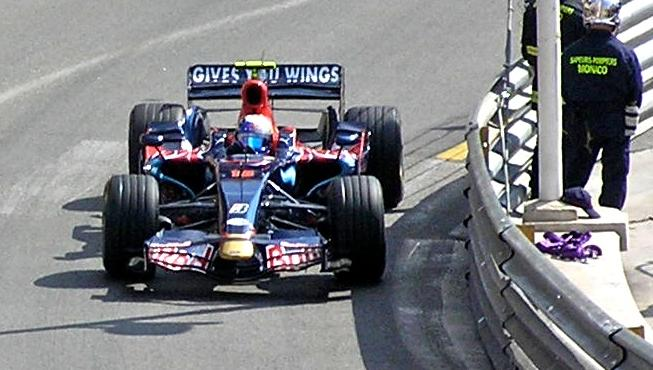
The STR3 made its racing début at the 2008 Monaco Grand Prix, driven by Sébastien Bourdais and Sebastian Vettel (pictured).

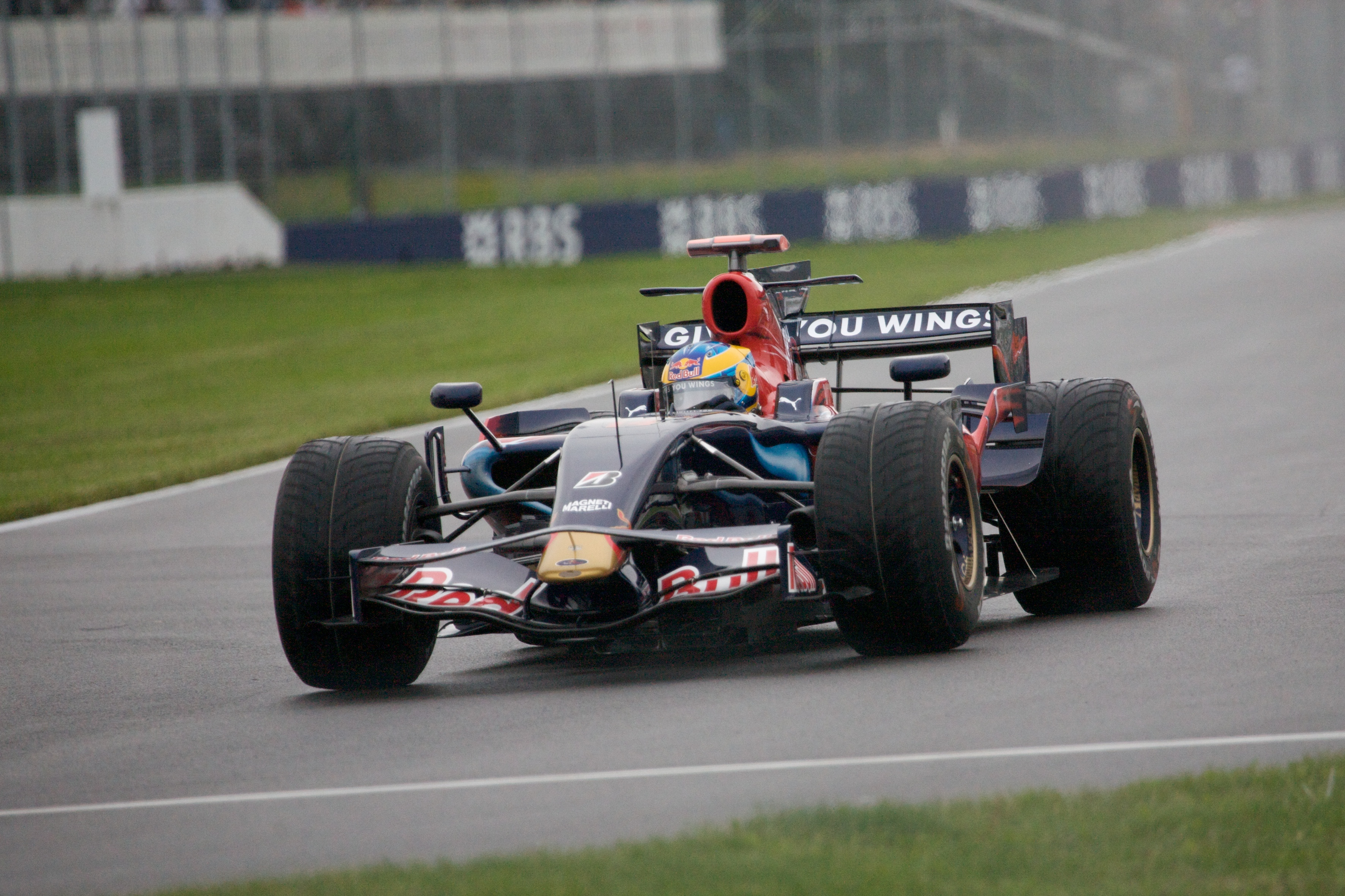
Bourdais driving the STR3 at the 2008 Canadian Grand Prix.

== BOSS GP ==
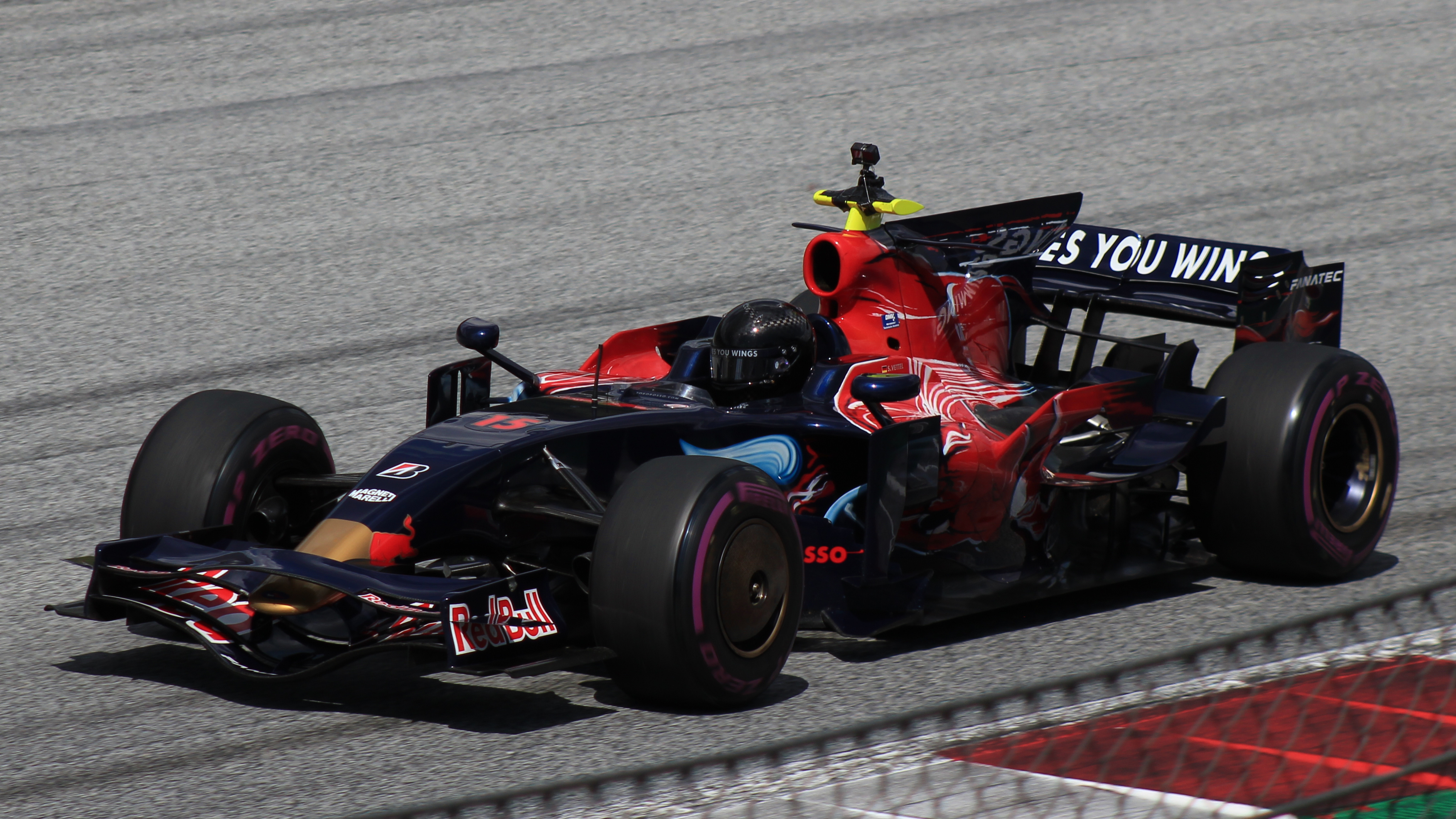
Thomas Jackermeier driving the STR3 at the Red Bull Ring.

The STR3 driven by Vettel made its debut in the 2022 BOSS GP Series, driven by Thomas Jackermeier, the CEO of German sim racing hardware company Fanatec. He scored two second place finishes in the F1 Class at the Red Bull Ring.

== Complete Formula One results ==
(key) (results in bold indicate pole position)

Year	Entrant	Engine	Tyres	Drivers	1	2	3	4	5	6	7	8	9	10	11	12	13	14	15	16	17	18	Points	WCC
2008	Scuderia Toro Rosso	Ferrari V8	**B**		AUS	MAL	BHR	ESP	TUR	MON	CAN	FRA	GBR	GER	HUN	EUR	BEL	ITA	SIN	JPN	CHN	BRA	**39***	**6th***
2008	Scuderia Toro Rosso	Ferrari V8	**B**	(France) Sébastien Bourdais						Ret	13	17	11	12	18	10	7	18	12	10	13	14	**39***	**6th***
2008	Scuderia Toro Rosso	Ferrari V8	**B**	(Germany) Sebastian Vettel						5	8	12	Ret	8	Ret	6	5	**1**	5	6	9	4	**39***	**6th***

* 37 points scored with the STR3.
