= 2008 Turkish Grand Prix =

Coordinates: 40°57′20.5″N 29°24′29.7″E

Race 5 of 18 in the 2008 Formula One World Championship
← Previous race	Next race →

Race details
- Date: 11 May 2008
- Official name: 2008 Formula 1 Petrol Ofisi Turkish Grand Prix
- Location: Istanbul Racing Circuit, Tuzla, Turkey
- Course: Permanent racing facility
- Course length: 5.338 km (3.317 miles)
- Distance: 58 laps, 309.396 km (192.250 miles)
- Weather: Sunny with temperatures reaching up to 17 °C (63 °F)
- Attendance: 40,000

Pole position
Driver	(Brazil) Felipe Massa	Ferrari
- Time: 1:27.617

Fastest lap
Driver	(Finland) Kimi Räikkönen	Ferrari
- Time: 1:26.506 on lap 20

Podium
First	(Brazil) Felipe Massa	Ferrari
Second	(United Kingdom) Lewis Hamilton	McLaren-Mercedes
Third	(Finland) Kimi Räikkönen	Ferrari

The 2008 Turkish Grand Prix (officially the 2008 Formula 1 Petrol Ofisi Turkish Grand Prix) was a Formula One motor race held on 11 May 2008 at the Istanbul Racing Circuit, Tuzla, Turkey. The 58-lap race, the fifth of the 2008 Formula One World Championship, was won by Felipe Massa for the Ferrari team from pole position. Lewis Hamilton finished second in a McLaren, with Kimi Räikkönen third in the second Ferrari.

Massa claimed pole, with teammate Räikkönen fourth, the two Ferrari cars sandwiching the McLarens of Heikki Kovalainen and Hamilton. At the first corner Räikkönen clipped Kovalainen's rear tyre and gave him a puncture. The safety car was deployed on the first lap, after a collision, but only remained out for one lap. During the course of the race, Hamilton, intending to make one more pit stop than both Ferrari drivers, was faster than Massa due to carrying a lighter fuel load and overtook him on lap 24. After Hamilton had made his third pit stop, he rejoined in second behind Massa but in front of the Championship leader, Räikkönen. Massa won the race, with Hamilton 3.779 seconds behind, and Räikkönen a further half-second behind. The two BMW Sauber cars of Robert Kubica and Nick Heidfeld took fourth and fifth.

In the week running up to the grand prix, the Super Aguri team had withdrawn from Formula One, due to financial problems, leaving the sport with only ten teams. Massa's victory was his third consecutive pole position and victory in Turkey, having also won the race from pole in 2006 and 2007. Rubens Barrichello celebrated his 257th Grand Prix start, breaking Riccardo Patrese's previous record of 256. Due to the race result, Räikkönen's lead in the Drivers' Championship was lowered to seven points. Massa rose to second from fourth, whilst Hamilton dropped to third, both drivers tying on 28 points but separated by Massa's two wins thus far to Hamilton's one. In the Constructors' Championship, Ferrari increased their lead to 19 points ahead of BMW Sauber, with McLaren a further two points behind in third.

== Background ==
The Grand Prix was contested by 20 drivers, in ten teams of two. The teams, also known as "constructors", were Ferrari, BMW Sauber, Renault, Williams, Red Bull Racing, Toyota, Toro Rosso, Honda, Force India and McLaren. This was two drivers fewer than in previous rounds of the 2008 season, due to the withdrawal of the Super Aguri team from the sport following the previous race.

Going into the race, Kimi Räikkönen was leading the Drivers' Championship, on 29 points; nine points ahead of Lewis Hamilton, with Räikkönen's teammate, Felipe Massa, in fourth 11 points behind. BMW Sauber drivers Robert Kubica and Nick Heidfeld were third and fifth, on 19 and 16 points respectively. In the Constructors' Championship Ferrari were leading on 47 points; 12 points ahead of BMW Sauber on 35 points, with McLaren just one further point behind them. The race was also Rubens Barrichello's 257th Grand Prix, which broke the record for the number of Grand Prix starts previously held by Riccardo Patrese. The particular Grand Prix at which he broke this record was disputed, as there was some disagreement about what constituted a "start", such as the 2002 Spanish Grand Prix, where Barrichello entered but did not actually take part in the race on Sunday. Barrichello and Honda decided to make Turkey the site for their celebrations, issuing a statement that said, "In view of the lack of consensus regarding which specific race marks Rubens's 257th Grand Prix, Rubens will celebrate the milestone of 257 Grand Prix appearances at the Turkish Grand Prix". His Honda team gave him a special anniversary livery and helmet, both of which prominently featured the number 257. Patrese said that he would feel some sadness at having his record broken.

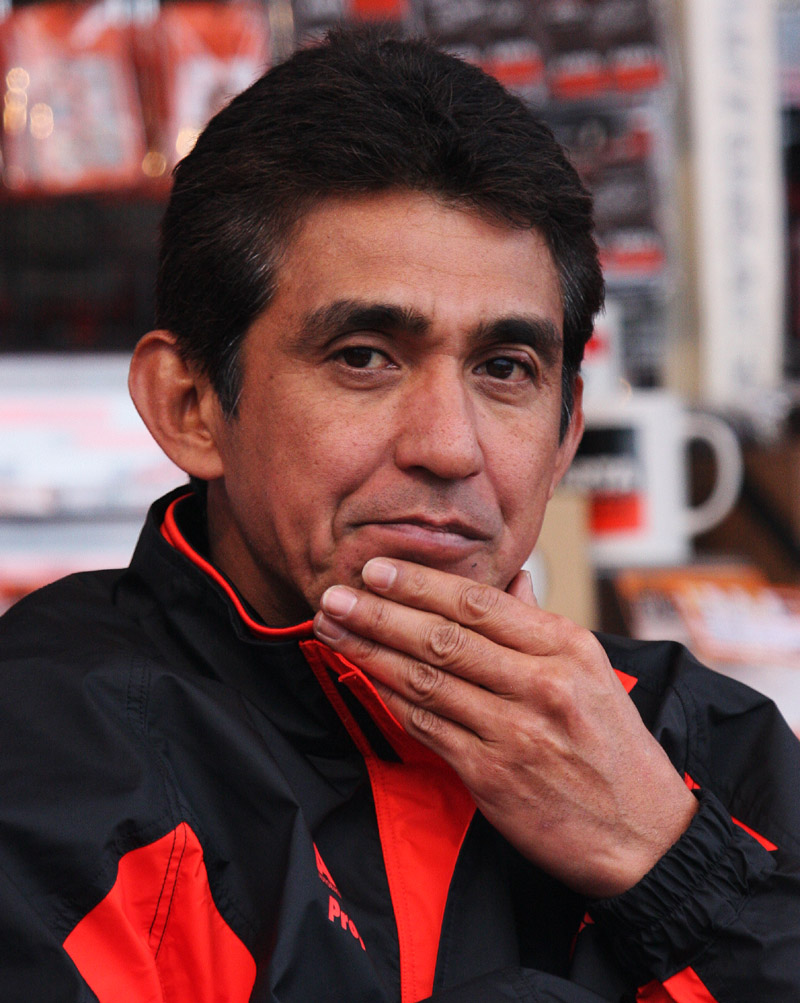
Super Aguri's founder, Aguri Suzuki. It was announced that the team would withdraw from Formula One with immediate effect before the Turkish Grand Prix.

The Super Aguri team had been in financial trouble since a proposed takeover deal backed by equity firm Dubai International Capital, under the "Magma Group" banner, failed to take effect. Early in the week before the Grand Prix, after team owner Aguri Suzuki revealed the extent of his difficulties, the team's trucks were blocked from entering the paddock by the Fédération Internationale de l'Automobile (FIA), Formula One's governing body. This decision was taken by the FIA after being informed by Honda's Formula One team CEO, Nick Fry, that Super Aguri, who used Honda engines and Honda-derived chassis, would not be racing at Istanbul Park. Suzuki then admitted that his financial troubles could not be solved by existing primary sponsor SS United Group Oil & Gas Company, leaving the team with no choice but to withdraw from Formula One as of May 6.

The Toro Rosso team's plan to introduce its new car, the STR3, at this race were postponed due to a lack of spare parts. This was due to an accident suffered by driver Sébastien Bourdais during testing prior to the previous race, which had resulted in the chassis sustaining heavy damage. Toro Rosso had already used an updated version of its 2007 car, the STR2, for the first four races of the season, and were now forced to race with it in Turkey as well. The team's other driver, Sebastian Vettel, said that he was "disappointed" that the new car was not ready. However, this was the last race in which the STR2 competed, as the STR3 subsequently made its début at the next race.

Ferrari decided not to use a new nose for their car that had made its début at the previous race due to the low-downforce nature of the Turkish circuit. According to team manager Luca Baldisserri, "The cars used by Kimi [Räikkönen] and Felipe [Massa] are basically to the same specification as those that were used in Spain, with the exception that at Istanbul Park we will not use the slotted nose. This is because this solution is much more efficient at medium to high downforce levels, whereas Turkey requires less downforce. The new nose worked very well, but as we said when we gave it its race debut in Barcelona, we would only use it at circuits where we deem it will bring us an advantage over a more conventional component."

McLaren's Heikki Kovalainen was passed fit to race in the days leading up to the race. At the previous race, Kovalainen had suffered a serious crash, although he escaped uninjured apart from minor concussion. Kovalainen said that he felt ready to race again: "I arrived here today feeling confident that I would pass the FIA test as I feel 100% and if I had not felt 100% I would have told the team already and stayed at home. My preparation for this weekend has gone well and we have done a lot of fitness training."

== Practice ==
Three practice sessions were held before the Sunday race – two on Friday, and a third on Saturday. The Friday morning and afternoon sessions each lasted 90 minutes. The third session was held on Saturday morning and lasted an hour. In the first free practice session, several large damp patches around the circuit – caused by late track cleaning rather than rain – dissuaded drivers from attempting laps and left the frustrated teams sitting in the pits waiting for the surface to dry as low track temperatures made the situation worse. When the cars did take to the track, many of the drivers either went off the road or spun. Räikkönen only did three laps, before retiring with a gearbox problem, causing him to finish last. Massa set the session's fastest time, ahead of McLaren duo Heikki Kovalainen and Hamilton. After the session had ended, Fisichella was given a three-place grid penalty by the stewards for exiting the pit lane whilst the light at its exit was still red.

The second free practice session was held in dry conditions, but the track was still damp from earlier drizzle. After 30 minutes, Red Bull's Mark Webber crashed at turn six, his car sustaining serious damage. Webber was unhurt, although the crash meant that he finished the session in 19th position as he was unable to complete any further laps. The session was briefly stopped as a result while the marshals cleared away the debris. In this session, Räikkönen set the fastest time, with Hamilton next up. Massa was third, while David Coulthard of Red Bull broke up the Ferrari-McLaren domination by setting the fourth-fastest time, ahead of Kovalainen. The third and final practice session was held on the Saturday morning in dry conditions, but with damp patches on the track from earlier rain. As was the pattern for the season, the championship contenders appeared to work on preparations for the final part of qualifying and the race in this session and thus carry heavier fuel loads. Webber set the fastest time in the session, with Renault's Fernando Alonso in second, and Coulthard in third. Massa was fifth, Hamilton seventh, Räikkönen 11th and Kovalainen 12th.

== Qualifying ==
Following the withdrawal of the Super Aguri team's two entries, minor changes were made to the qualifying procedure. In the first qualifying session, which would run for 20 minutes, the five slowest cars (a reduction from the previous number of six) would be eliminated, leaving 15 drivers to continue into the second session. In the second session, which would last 15 minutes, the five slowest runners (again reduced from six) were to once again be eliminated, leaving the ten fastest drivers to compete in session three, as had previously been the case. The time taken for each session remained the same. The third session would determine the positions from first to tenth, and would decide pole position. Cars which failed to make the final session could refuel before the race, so ran lighter in first and second sessions. Cars which competed in the final session of qualifying were not allowed to refuel before the race, and as such carried more fuel than in the previous sessions.

"I am very happy to have taken a third consecutive pole at this circuit: it is really motivating and it would be fantastic to do the same again tomorrow in the race."

— Ferrari driver Felipe Massa, after qualifying.

Qualifying was a two-way battle between Ferrari and McLaren, with BMW Sauber not showing as strong a pace as they had in previous qualifying sessions, and Alonso not on as light a fuel load as he had in Spain. Massa qualified on pole with a time of 1:27.617, ahead of Kovalainen and Hamilton. Hamilton elected not to run a lap on the softer option of the two tyre compounds, feeling that they were running low on grip in the later stages of the lap. He completed his final lap of the session on a "scrubbed" set of the harder tyre compound and it got him third place. Afterwards Hamilton said that he felt that his tyre choice had been incorrect. However, he changed his mind the following day, having made an examination of the relevant telemetry data. Championship leader Räikkönen qualified fourth, ahead of Kubica and Webber. Alonso, Trulli, Heidfeld and Coulthard completed the top 10. Nico Rosberg driving for Williams qualified 11th, ahead of Barrichello and his teammate Jenson Button. Vettel qualified 14th, followed by Timo Glock for Toyota. Nakajima qualified in 16th, ahead of Nelson Piquet Jr. (Renault) and Bourdais. Afterward Bourdais said that his low position was due to being held up by both Force India drivers: "Bad traffic, basically the Force India guys, ruined my afternoon: on my first run I was held up by Sutil as early as Turn 3 and on the second, I came up behind Fisichella in Turn 8". Fisichella qualified 19th but his three-place penalty saw him drop behind teammate Sutil to 20th and last place on the grid.

=== Qualifying classification ===
Pos	No	Driver	Constructor	Part 1	Part 2	Part 3	Grid
1	2	(Brazil) Felipe Massa	Ferrari	1:25.994	1:26.192	1:27.617	1
2	23	(Finland) Heikki Kovalainen	McLaren-Mercedes	1:26.736	1:26.290	1:27.808	2
3	22	(United Kingdom) Lewis Hamilton	McLaren-Mercedes	1:26.192	1:26.477	1:27.923	3
4	1	(Finland) Kimi Räikkönen	Ferrari	1:26.457	1:26.050	1:27.936	4
5	4	(Poland) Robert Kubica	BMW Sauber	1:26.761	1:26.129	1:28.390	5
6	10	(Australia) Mark Webber	Red Bull-Renault	1:26.773	1:26.466	1:28.417	6
7	5	(Spain) Fernando Alonso	Renault	1:26.836	1:26.522	1:28.422	7
8	11	(Italy) Jarno Trulli	Toyota	1:26.695	1:26.822	1:28.836	8
9	3	(Germany) Nick Heidfeld	BMW Sauber	1:27.107	1:26.607	1:28.882	9
10	9	(United Kingdom) David Coulthard	Red Bull-Renault	1:26.939	1:26.520	1:29.959	10
11	7	(Germany) Nico Rosberg	Williams-Toyota	1:27.367	1:27.012		11
12	17	(Brazil) Rubens Barrichello	Honda	1:27.355	1:27.219		12
13	16	(United Kingdom) Jenson Button	Honda	1:27.428	1:27.298		13
14	15	(Germany) Sebastian Vettel	Toro Rosso-Ferrari	1:27.442	1:27.412		14
15	12	(Germany) Timo Glock	Toyota	1:26.614	1:27.806		15
16	8	(Japan) Kazuki Nakajima	Williams-Toyota	1:27.547			16
17	6	(Brazil) Nelson Piquet Jr.	Renault	1:27.568			17
18	14	(France) Sébastien Bourdais	Toro Rosso-Ferrari	1:27.621			18
19	21	(Italy) Giancarlo Fisichella	Force India-Ferrari	1:27.807			20^{1}
20	20	(Germany) Adrian Sutil	Force India-Ferrari	1:28.325			19

Notes

- ^1 – Giancarlo Fisichella got a three place grid penalty for exiting the pitlane whilst the red lights were still on during Friday's first practice session.

== Race ==
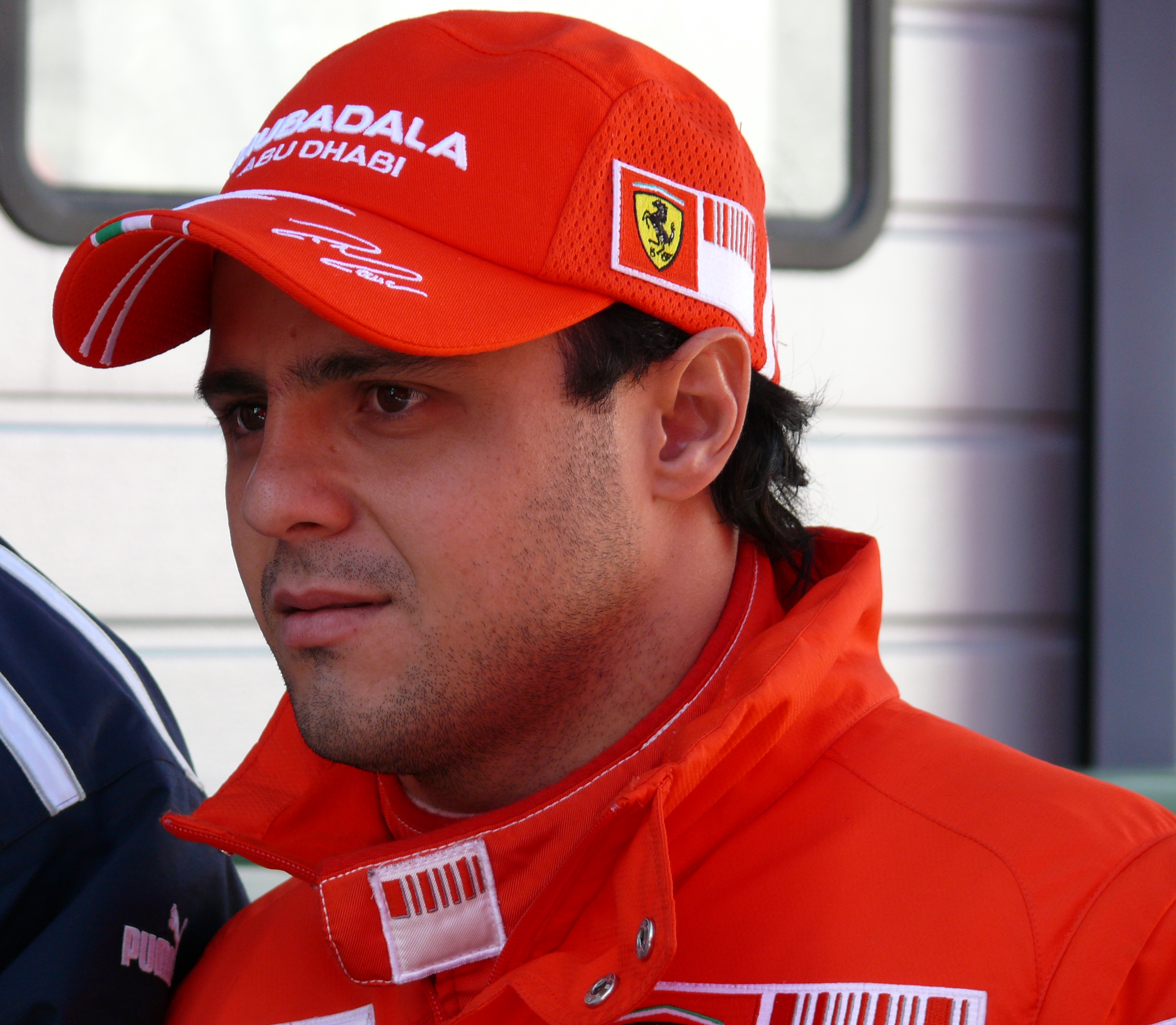
Felipe Massa won the race, after starting from pole position.

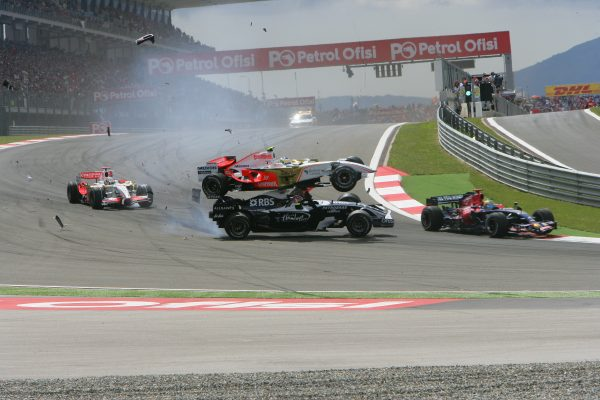
Giancarlo Fisichella flies over Kazuki Nakajima

At the start, Hamilton immediately overtook Kovalainen to claim second behind Massa. Räikkönen had a bad start and was squeezed into the first corner by Kovalainen. The two cars made light contact, with Räikkönen's front wing touching Kovalainen's left rear tyre. This resulted in a puncture for the McLaren driver which forced him to make an unscheduled pit stop on the second lap, which dropped him to 18th and last position. Räikkönen damaged his front wing but continued the entire race distance without changing the nose section of his car. Meanwhile, Kubica took advantage to move up into third position, whilst Räikkönen was also passed by Alonso. Further back, Vettel collided with Sutil and both were forced to pit, Vettel with a puncture and Sutil for a new front wing. Sutil's teammate Fisichella and Nakajima collided at the first turn as well, after Fisichella braked too late and could not avoid the Williams driver. Fisichella retired on the spot but Nakajima, despite losing both his front and rear wing in the incident, was able to make it back to his pit box before retiring. The incident resulted in the safety car being deployed.

"I thought he [Hamilton] was light – He pushed me hard"

— Felipe Massa, speaking after the race.

The safety car was withdrawn at the end of the second lap and the race got underway again with Massa in the lead. Räikkönen, meanwhile, overtook Alonso for fourth place. Between lap four and lap eleven, Massa and Hamilton exchanged fastest laps and the McLaren driver managed to hold the gap between him and the leader at one and a half seconds. The two drivers left third-placed Kubica behind, who in turn was being caught quickly by Räikkönen. Further back, Kovalainen passed Sutil on lap 12 and Vettel on lap 17. Hamilton then began to close the gap between himself and Massa, posting consecutive quick lap times and was within seven–tenths of a second by lap fifteen. Alonso was the first of the leading runners to make a pit stop on lap 15, dropping to tenth. Hamilton pitted one lap later and dropped to sixth, while Massa stayed out for another three laps. Both he and Kubica pitted at the same time, leaving Räikkönen temporarily in the lead. On lap 20, he set the fastest lap of the race, a 1:21.506, before he himself pitted at the end of lap 21, as did the then second-placed Heidfeld. Räikkönen rejoined ahead of Kubica, while Heidfeld came out ahead of both Alonso and Webber, to elevate himself to fifth. Massa was now back in the lead, but with Hamilton just 0.8 seconds behind. Running lighter on fuel with a view to making an additional pit stop to the Ferrari driver, Hamilton was able to close the gap on Massa and on lap 24, he overtook him at turn twelve. Hamilton now led, with Massa second and Räikkönen third.

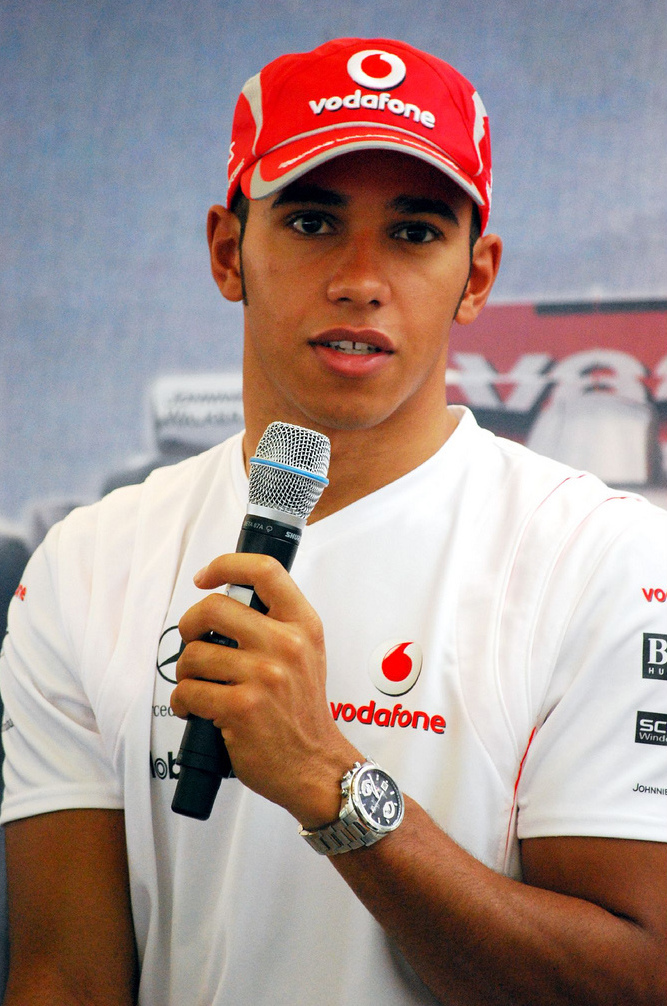
Lewis Hamilton finished second.

Hamilton soon broke away from Massa, lapping over a second quicker than the Ferrari driver. Further back, Bourdais spun off at turn twelve, with a rear suspension failure that put him out of the race. The top five in the race were now Hamilton, Massa, Räikkönen, Kubica and Heidfeld. Over the next six laps, Hamilton stretched his lead to over six seconds before pitting on lap 32. He rejoined the race in third, 2.6 seconds behind second-placed Räikkönen. Further back, on lap 34, Kovalainen passed Glock, only to be immediately re-passed. He did succeed up the main straight, on the same lap. Two laps later, he passed Button.

Eight laps after Hamilton's pit stop, Ferrari called Massa in for his final stop of the afternoon, making Räikkönen the leader of the race once more. This lead, however, only lasted for a couple of laps as the Finn pitted on lap 43, also making his final stop of the afternoon. On lap 43, Hamilton led by 14.4 seconds from Massa with Räikkönen a further seven seconds behind. Two laps later Hamilton was forced to make his third and final pit stop. The McLaren driver rejoined the track behind Massa but crucially ahead of championship leader Räikkönen. The top three would remain this way for the remainder of the race.

Further back in fourth and fifth were the two BMW Saubers of Kubica and Heidfeld and behind them were Alonso, Trulli, Webber, Rosberg and Coulthard, with Kovalainen pursuing closely behind them. Kovalainen passed Coulthard on lap 48, and then on the next lap passed Rosberg. However, Rosberg immediately overtook Kovalainen to regain his position, and Kovalainen was forced to pit on lap 50. After his final pit stop, Kovalainen rejoined the circuit in 13th position. Felipe Massa won the race, making it his third consecutive win at the circuit, 3.7 seconds ahead of Hamilton, with Räikkönen a further half-second behind in third. The two BMWs of Kubica and Heidfeld finished fourth and fifth respectively while further back Alonso, Webber and Rosberg completed the top eight. Coulthard finished ninth, Trulli 10th and Button 11th. After his puncture at the start, Kovalainen had managed to recover to 12th by the end of the race, passing Glock in the closing stages. Glock, Barrichello, Piquet, Sutil and Vettel were the last of the classified finishers.

=== Post-race ===
I am so thrilled with today's result, and I think this is the best race ever for me. It's not about winning, it's about feeling that you extract 100% from yourself and the car and I did that today. Before the race our prediction was that all being well I would finish fifth, so second is such a bonus. I was not happy with my performance yesterday and perhaps if I had managed to get the car on pole I could have won. However, we knew that we would have to use a three stop strategy as a precaution as we had some issues with our tyres.

— Lewis Hamilton, speaking after the race.

The race victory was Massa's third win in Turkey in as many years, having won in both 2006 and 2007. The top three finishers appeared in the subsequent press conference. Massa said that:

It was a very tough race but the team work magnificently, giving me a great car. When Hamilton came underneath me at an incredible pace, I preferred not to take too many risks: the pit wall informed me that he was clearly running a lighter fuel load even if we were not certain he was on a three stop strategy. When that became clear, we were calmer, knowing we had everything in place to go for the win.

Ron Dennis, McLaren's team principal, commented on Hamilton's drive: "Today we saw a truly phenomenal drive from Lewis [Hamilton], in which he optimised a three-stop strategy that we were forced to adopt as a consequence of concerns we had with his tyres." Hamilton said that he felt that McLaren had closed the gap on Ferrari, and that he was "very excited" about the next race in Monaco.

Räikkönen said: "It was a difficult weekend for me but six points are definitely better than nothing. At the start, I was almost alongside Heikki but then he slowed and I had to brake too to avoid a heavy crash. We touched just enough to damage the end plate of the front wing on my car: it was not a very serious problem, but it definitely didn't help my race." Räikkönen also said that he decided not to change his front wing, which was damaged after his collision with Kovalainen, the process would have taken too long.

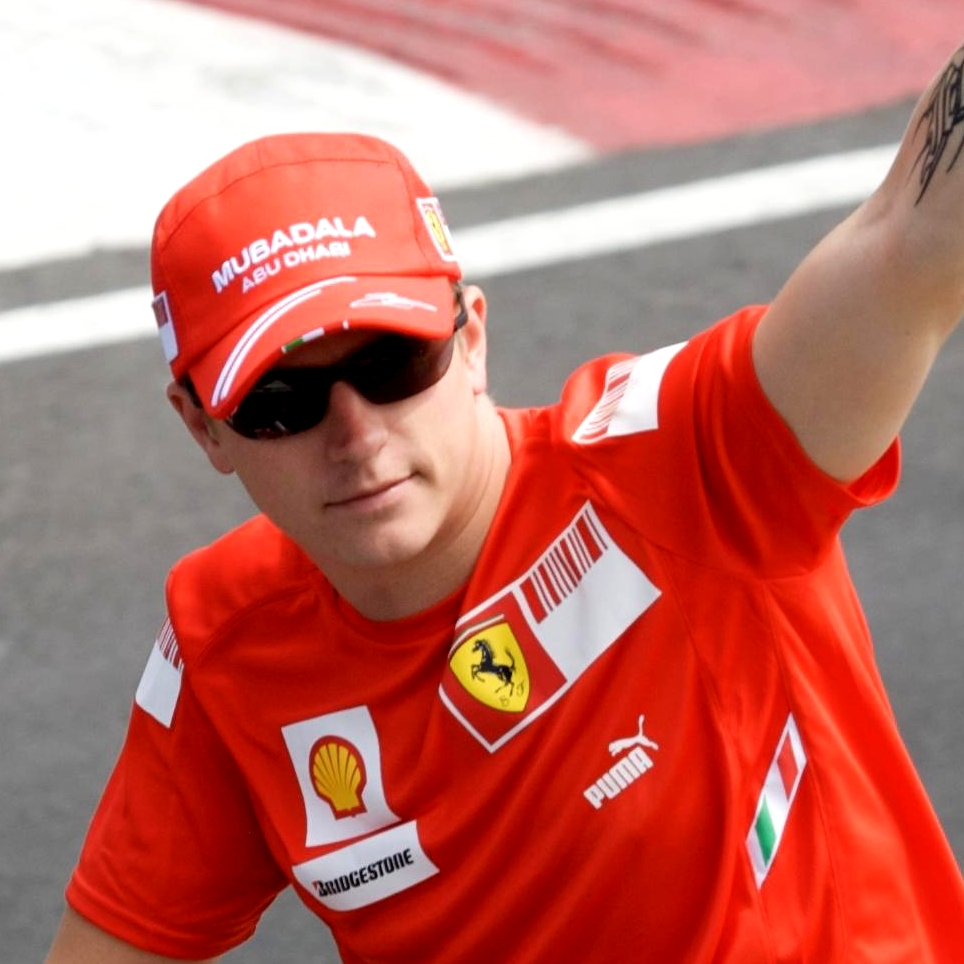
Kimi Räikkönen finished third.

Fisichella, who had collided with Nakajima on the first lap, which caused both drivers to retire, blamed Bourdais: "I made a good start but then under braking Bourdais changed direction twice and I couldn't brake in time and went into the back of the Williams." Nakajima said that, "I don't know exactly what happened; I just went into the first corner following the guy in front. I didn't change my line and I was suddenly hit from behind."

Bourdais commented on his retirement: "Something broke at the back of the car... Going into Turn 12, I braked at the usual point and the car went sideways, I felt the right rear corner of the car drop and it spun me round."

Räikkönen's lead in the Drivers' World Championship was reduced by two points to seven, ahead of Massa and Hamilton, the latter two on 28 points each. Kubica was in fourth, on 24 points, followed by his teammate Heidfeld on 20 points. In the Constructors' Championship, the Ferrari team increased its lead with a total of 66 points, whilst BMW Sauber were second with 44 points. McLaren were third with 42 points, Williams fourth with 13 points, and Red Bull were fifth, on ten.

=== Race classification ===
Pos	No	Driver	Constructor	Laps	Time/Retired	Grid	Points
1	2	(Brazil) Felipe Massa	Ferrari	58	1:26:49.451	1	10
2	22	(United Kingdom) Lewis Hamilton	McLaren-Mercedes	58	+3.779	3	8
3	1	(Finland) Kimi Räikkönen	Ferrari	58	+4.271	4	6
4	4	(Poland) Robert Kubica	BMW Sauber	58	+21.945	5	5
5	3	(Germany) Nick Heidfeld	BMW Sauber	58	+38.741	9	4
6	5	(Spain) Fernando Alonso	Renault	58	+53.724	7	3
7	10	(Australia) Mark Webber	Red Bull-Renault	58	+1:04.229	6	2
8	7	(Germany) Nico Rosberg	Williams-Toyota	58	+1:11.406	11	1
9	9	(United Kingdom) David Coulthard	Red Bull-Renault	58	+1:15.270	10	
10	11	(Italy) Jarno Trulli	Toyota	58	+1:16.344	8	
11	16	(United Kingdom) Jenson Button	Honda	57	+1 Lap	13	
12	23	(Finland) Heikki Kovalainen	McLaren-Mercedes	57	+1 Lap	2	
13	12	(Germany) Timo Glock	Toyota	57	+1 Lap	15	
14	17	(Brazil) Rubens Barrichello	Honda	57	+1 Lap	12	
15	6	(Brazil) Nelson Piquet Jr.	Renault	57	+1 Lap	17	
16	20	(Germany) Adrian Sutil	Force India-Ferrari	57	+1 Lap	19	
17	15	(Germany) Sebastian Vettel	Toro Rosso-Ferrari	57	+1 Lap	14	
Ret	14	(France) Sébastien Bourdais	Toro Rosso-Ferrari	24	Suspension	18	
Ret	8	(Japan) Kazuki Nakajima	Williams-Toyota	1	Collision damage	16	
Ret	21	(Italy) Giancarlo Fisichella	Force India-Ferrari	0	Collision	20	

== Championship standings after the race ==
Drivers' Championship standings

	Pos.	Driver	Points
	1	(Finland) Kimi Räikkönen	35
2	2	(Brazil) Felipe Massa	28
1	3	(United Kingdom) Lewis Hamilton	28
1	4	(Poland) Robert Kubica	24
	5	(Germany) Nick Heidfeld	20

Constructors' Championship standings

	Pos.	Constructor	Points
	1	(Italy) Ferrari	63
	2	(Germany) BMW Sauber	44
	3	(United Kingdom) McLaren-Mercedes	42
	4	(United Kingdom) Williams-Toyota	13
1	5	(Austria) Red Bull-Renault	10

- Note: Only the top five positions are included for both sets of standings.

== See also ==
- 2008 Istanbul Park GP2 Series round

Previous race: 2008 Spanish Grand Prix	FIA Formula One World Championship; 2008 season	Next race: 2008 Monaco Grand Prix
Previous race: 2007 Turkish Grand Prix	Turkish Grand Prix	Next race: 2009 Turkish Grand Prix
