= 2008 Spanish Grand Prix =

Coordinates: 41°34′9.9″N 2°15′26.9″E

Race 4 of 18 in the 2008 Formula One World Championship
← Previous race	Next race →

Race details
- Date: 27 April 2008
- Official name: Formula 1 Gran Premio de España Telefónica 2008
- Location: Circuit de Catalunya, Montmeló, Catalonia, Spain
- Course: Permanent racing facility
- Course length: 4.655 km (2.892 miles)
- Distance: 66 laps, 307.104 km (190.826 miles)
- Weather: Sunny
- Attendance: 128,000

Pole position
Driver	(Finland) Kimi Räikkönen	Ferrari
- Time: 1:21.813

Fastest lap
Driver	(Finland) Kimi Räikkönen	Ferrari
- Time: 1:21.670 on lap 46

Podium
First	(Finland) Kimi Räikkönen	Ferrari
Second	(Brazil) Felipe Massa	Ferrari
Third	(United Kingdom) Lewis Hamilton	McLaren-Mercedes

The 2008 Spanish Grand Prix (formally the Formula 1 Gran Premio de España Telefónica 2008) was a Formula One motor race held on 27 April 2008 at the Circuit de Catalunya, Montmeló, Spain. It was the fourth race of the 2008 Formula One World Championship. Kimi Räikkönen for the Ferrari team won the 66-lap race starting from pole position. Felipe Massa finished second in the other Ferrari, and Lewis Hamilton was third in a McLaren.

Räikkönen began the race from pole position alongside Renault driver Fernando Alonso. Massa began from third, alongside BMW Sauber driver Robert Kubica. Hamilton, the eventual World Drivers' Champion, began from fifth and passed Kubica into the first corner, as Massa passed Alonso. Räikkönen maintained his lead through most of the race, leading to Ferrari's one-two finish. The safety car was deployed several times throughout the race, including for a serious crash involving McLaren driver Heikki Kovalainen, though the Finn escaped with only a minor concussion.

Prior to the race weekend, the event was put on probation by the Fédération Internationale de l'Automobile, the sport's governing body, for racist taunting during pre-season testing at the circuit. Subsequently, no such racism was reported during the race weekend. The event was Super Aguri's final Grand Prix, withdrawing afterwards due to financial pressures, leaving the sport with ten teams; this was also the last race for both of the team's drivers, Takuma Sato and Anthony Davidson.

The result promoted Ferrari to the lead in the World Constructors' Championship, twelve ahead of BMW Sauber and thirteen ahead of McLaren. Räikkönen maintained his lead in the Drivers' Championship with 29 points, nine and ten clear from Hamilton and Kubica. Massa moved into fourth place on 18 points, with 14 races remaining in the season.

== Background ==
The Grand Prix was contested by 22 drivers, in 11 teams of two. The teams, also known as "constructors", were Ferrari, McLaren-Mercedes, Renault, Honda, Force India, BMW Sauber, Toyota, Red Bull Racing, Williams, Toro Rosso and Super Aguri. Tyre supplier Bridgestone brought two different tyre compounds to the race; the softer of the two marked by a single white stripe down one of the grooves.

Prior to the race, Ferrari driver Kimi Räikkönen led the Drivers' Championship with 19 points, and BMW Sauber driver Nick Heidfeld was second with 16 points. McLaren driver Lewis Hamilton, BMW driver Robert Kubica and Hamilton's teammate Heikki Kovalainen held the next three positions, all with 14 points. In the Constructors' Championship, BMW Sauber were leading with 30 points, one point ahead of Ferrari, and two ahead of McLaren-Mercedes.

After Hamilton won the season opener in Australia, Ferrari had dominated the next two races in Malaysia and Bahrain. In the Malaysian Grand Prix, Ferrari driver Felipe Massa had claimed pole position, and while he later spun off and retired, his teammate Räikkönen went on to win the race. Ferrari's form had continued at the Bahrain Grand Prix, where Massa had led Räikkönen to a one-two finish. Despite the promising start to the season, Ferrari team principal Stefano Domenicali said the team was not celebrating prematurely:

The real Ferrari is not the one we've seen at the Australian GP. The team reacted immediately and has shown the great potential of our package, which is extremely competitive. Having said that, we have to be aware. We're approaching the Spanish GP with a maximum effort, keeping our feet on the ground: we were not depressed after the first race and we are not euphoric after Bahrain. We need absolute motivation and we are aware of the fact that our competitors are getting better.

With his team leading the Constructors' Championship, Heidfeld said BMW was outperforming expectations: "It's better than expected after the winter time, of course, but it could also be better. It can always be better." BMW had opened the season with podium finishes in each of the first three races, which team principal Mario Theissen said put his team amongst the top three, along with Ferrari and McLaren.

After a poor race in Bahrain, where he narrowly avoided stalling on the grid before colliding with Renault's Fernando Alonso a lap later, Hamilton said he would return stronger in Spain: "I approach it in the same way and obviously I won't be making the same mistake again. This weekend being here, feeling fresh after a good break from racing, and making sure we come here fresh has been important. I feel good." His team said that they had made significant improvements to their car, the McLaren MP4-23, in the three-week break, but were reserving judgement until the race to see how their performance had improved in comparison to their rivals.

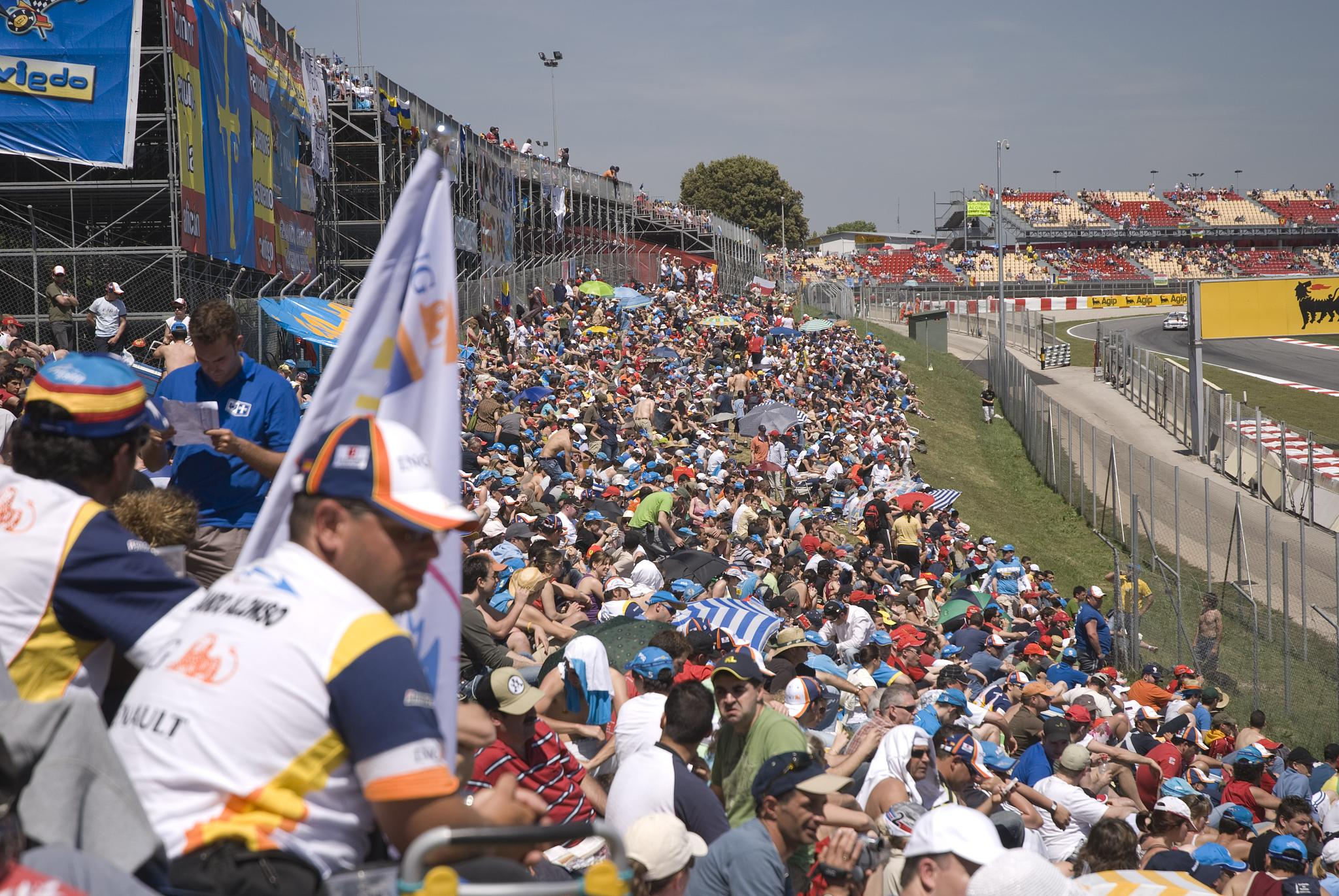
Fernando Alonso supporters at the Grand Prix

The event also took place under the shadow of incidents that had taken place at the same circuit during pre-season testing. At one of the test sessions, Hamilton was subjected to racist taunting by some of the spectators. In response, the Fédération Internationale de l'Automobile (FIA) launched a "Racing Against Racism" programme, and placed the Spanish and European Grands Prix on probation, the latter event being held in the Spanish city of Valencia. During the course of the event itself, no such incidents were reported. Hamilton was particularly unpopular with the country's Formula One fans due to his acrimonious inter-team rivalry with Spaniard Alonso during the previous year's championship, which had resulted in the latter leaving the McLaren team and returning to Renault for 2008.

The Super Aguri team had been in financial trouble since a proposed takeover deal backed by equity firm Dubai International Capital, under the "Magma Group" banner, failed to take effect. The team narrowly avoided folding in mid-April, and were only given confirmation to compete by team owners Honda on the Friday prior to the race. This would be the team's final Grand Prix, withdrawing after two years in Formula One prior to the Turkish Grand Prix, leaving the sport with ten teams for the first time since the 2005 season.

== Practice ==
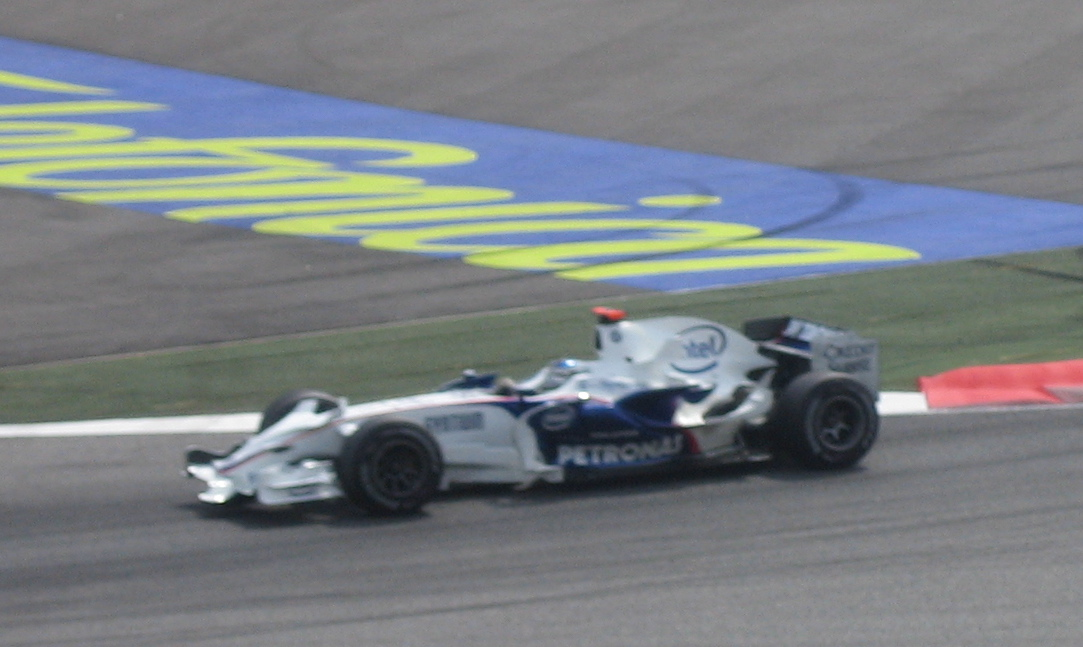
Nick Heidfeld was quickest in the final session of practice.

Three practice sessions were held before the Sunday race—two on Friday, and a third on Saturday. The Friday morning and afternoon sessions each lasted 90 minutes. The third session was held on Saturday morning and lasted an hour. The Ferraris were fastest in the first session; Räikkönen was quickest with a time of 1:20.649, ahead of Massa, who recovered from a spin and an off-track excursion on his first two laps to take second. Hamilton, Kubica and Kovalainen took the next three positions, ahead of home driver Alonso in sixth. Räikkönen repeated his morning effort in the second session, with a time of 1:21.935, as the frontrunners experimented with higher fuel loads. Renault driver Nelson Piquet was next quickest, ahead of Alonso, Williams driver Kazuki Nakajima, Massa and Red Bull driver Mark Webber. The McLarens had a less successful session; Kovalainen struggled with gearbox problems, and difficulty with Hamilton's set-up meant he managed 11th after suffering from excessive oversteer. Heidfeld was quickest in the final session, his 1:21.269 benefiting from use of the quicker soft compound tyre. Webber's teammate David Coulthard was next quickest, ahead of Alonso, Kubica, Toyota driver Jarno Trulli and Sébastien Bourdais of Toro Rosso. Ferrari and McLaren again ran heavier cars, and neither team managed better than ninth quickest. Mechanical problems meant Webber failed to set a time, his car coming to a halt in the pit-lane exit after two installation laps.

== Qualifying ==
The qualifying session on Saturday afternoon was split into three parts. The first part ran for 20 minutes, and cars that finished the session 17th or lower were eliminated from qualifying. The second part of qualifying lasted 15 minutes and eliminated cars that finished in positions 11 to 16. The final part of qualifying determined the positions from first to tenth, and decided pole position. Cars which failed to make the final session could refuel before the race, so ran lighter in those sessions. Cars which competed in the final session of qualifying were not allowed to refuel before the race, and as such carried more fuel than in the previous sessions.

I've been chasing pole for a while now, but for one reason or another, it always escaped me. But today I got it. There is no better place to start so I will try and make the most of that tomorrow. It will be important to get off the line well, getting through the first corner without any problems. Then it will be down to exploiting the car's potential and that is definitely good. The race is what matters and tomorrow I want to bring home a nice result.

— Kimi Räikkönen, following the third qualifying session.

Räikkönen clinched his first pole position of the season with a time of 1:21.813. Alonso would start alongside him on the grid, amid suspicions the Spaniard was fuelled light for the race. Massa, Kubica and Hamilton qualified next quickest; just 0.2 seconds separated Hamilton's time from that of Räikkönen. Kovalainen would line up on the third row of the grid next to his teammate; Webber and Trulli would start from the fourth row. Heidfeld was disappointed with his ninth place, after suffering from tyre problems on his final lap; Piquet, who made it into the final session for the first time in his career, qualified just ahead of Honda driver Rubens Barrichello and Nakajima. Honda driver Jenson Button and Timo Glock of Toyota would occupy the seventh row; Williams driver Nico Rosberg was outqualified by his teammate for the first time in the season, and would start from 15th, ahead of Bourdais. Coulthard failed to make it through the first session after failing to get sufficient heat into his tyres; Toro Rosso driver Sebastian Vettel and the two Force Indias of Giancarlo Fisichella and Adrian Sutil took positions 18 to 20. The Super Aguris of Anthony Davidson and Takuma Sato would line up on the back row of the grid in their final race.

=== Qualifying classification ===
Pos	No	Driver	Constructor	Part 1	Part 2	Part 3	Grid
1	1	(Finland) Kimi Räikkönen	Ferrari	1:20.701	1:20.784	1:21.813	1
2	5	(Spain) Fernando Alonso	Renault	1:21.347	1:20.804	1:21.904	2
3	2	(Brazil) Felipe Massa	Ferrari	1:21.528	1:20.584	1:22.058	3
4	4	(Poland) Robert Kubica	BMW Sauber	1:21.423	1:20.597	1:22.065	4
5	22	(United Kingdom) Lewis Hamilton	McLaren-Mercedes	1:21.366	1:20.825	1:22.096	5
6	23	(Finland) Heikki Kovalainen	McLaren-Mercedes	1:21.430	1:20.817	1:22.231	6
7	10	(Australia) Mark Webber	Red Bull-Renault	1:21.494	1:20.984	1:22.429	7
8	11	(Italy) Jarno Trulli	Toyota	1:21.158	1:20.907	1:22.529	8
9	3	(Germany) Nick Heidfeld	BMW Sauber	1:21.466	1:20.815	1:22.542	9
10	6	(Brazil) Nelson Piquet Jr.	Renault	1:21.409	1:20.894	1:22.699	10
11	17	(Brazil) Rubens Barrichello	Honda	1:21.548	1:21.049		11
12	8	(Japan) Kazuki Nakajima	Williams-Toyota	1:21.690	1:21.117		12
13	16	(United Kingdom) Jenson Button	Honda	1:21.757	1:21.211		13
14	12	(Germany) Timo Glock	Toyota	1:21.427	1:21.230		14
15	7	(Germany) Nico Rosberg	Williams-Toyota	1:21.472	1:21.349		15
16	14	(France) Sébastien Bourdais	Toro Rosso-Ferrari	1:21.540	1:21.724		16
17	9	(United Kingdom) David Coulthard	Red Bull-Renault	1:21.810			17
18	15	(Germany) Sebastian Vettel	Toro Rosso-Ferrari	1:22.108			18
19	21	(Italy) Giancarlo Fisichella	Force India-Ferrari	1:22.516			19
20	20	(Germany) Adrian Sutil	Force India-Ferrari	1:23.224			20
21	19	(United Kingdom) Anthony Davidson	Super Aguri-Honda	1:23.318			21
22	18	(Japan) Takuma Sato	Super Aguri-Honda	1:23.496			22

== Race ==
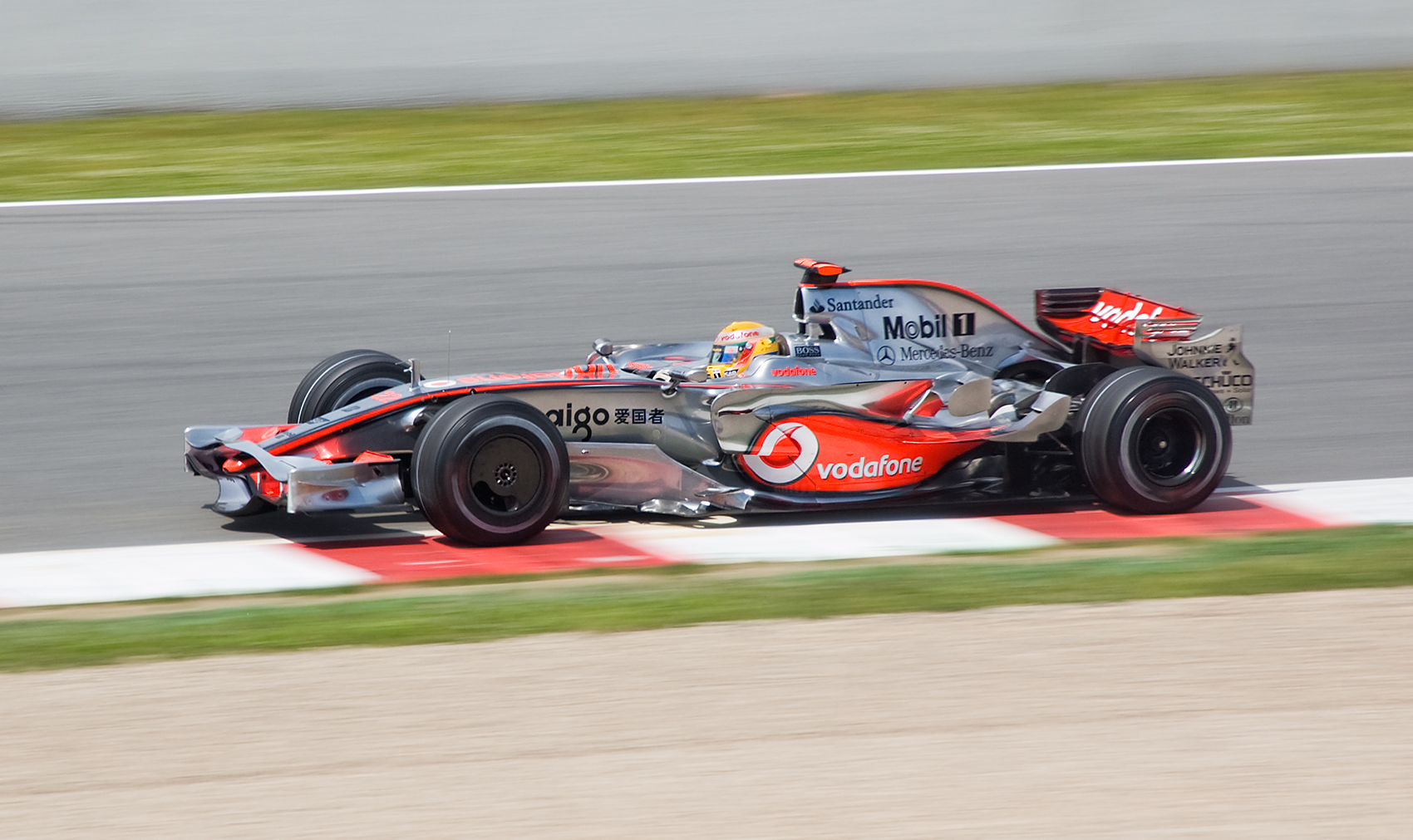
Lewis Hamilton started from fifth on the grid.

The conditions on the grid were dry before the race. The air temperature was 23 °C (73 °F) and the track temperature was 38 °C (100 °F); weather forecasts indicated a light wind, but otherwise calm conditions. Räikkönen held his lead into the first corner, as Massa passed Alonso to take second; Hamilton passed Kubica to take fourth. However, an incident further down the field brought out the safety car. Sutil's car entered a spin after attempting to pass Coulthard; the resulting collision eliminated Sutil and Vettel from the Grand Prix. The race restarted on lap four when the safety car peeled off, Räikkönen quickly increased his lead over Massa to more than a second. The gap between the Ferraris increased as Räikkönen continued to lap the quickest on track; Hamilton began to close in on Alonso, only to see the Renault pit on lap 16, promoting the McLaren to third place.

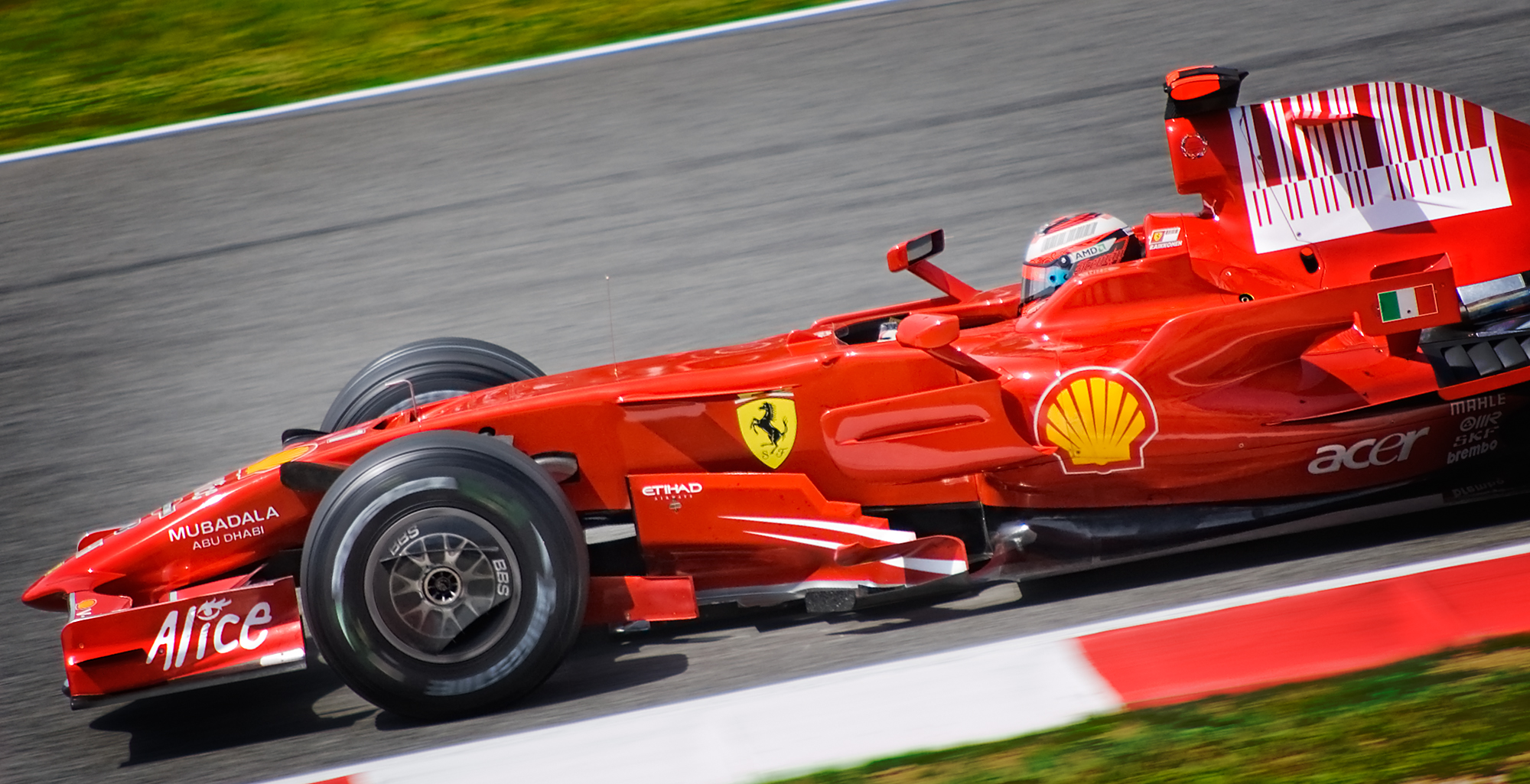
Kimi Räikkönen took the win from pole position.

Further down the field, several incidents reduced the field to 15 cars. Piquet, after running off the track on lap five, collided with Bourdais two laps later while attempting to pass at turn 10. The Renault retired from the race immediately; Bourdais struggled back to the pit lane before Toro Rosso decided to retire his car. The resulting debris ended Davidson's race when he retired on lap eight after sustaining radiator damage. On lap 22 Kovalainen's front left tyre suffered a rapid deflation, hurling his car into the barriers at an estimated 210 kilometres per hour (130 mph), with an impact of 26 g. As the track marshals extracted the McLaren from the barriers, the safety car was once again deployed. Heidfeld was forced to pit immediately as he was low on fuel, incurring a ten-second stop-go penalty for coming in before the pit-lane was officially re-opened. Barrichello and Fisichella then collided in the pit-lane on lap 26, heavily damaging the Honda's front wing, and requiring Barrichello to drive the whole lap with a disintegrating car, before retiring into his team's garage.

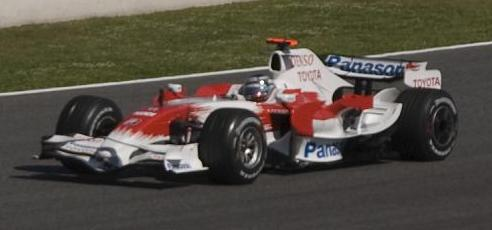
Jarno Trulli dropped several places when his team mistakenly called him in for a pit stop.

Räikkönen, Massa, Hamilton, Kubica and Alonso, having already made their pit stops, trailed the safety car until it peeled off on lap 29. As Räikkönen again increased his lead over Massa to more than two seconds, Alonso pulled over to the side of the track, smoke billowing from his engine, and retired. Rosberg's engine also suffered a failure, and the Williams retired on lap 42 from seventh place. Four laps later, Räikkönen set the fastest lap of the race, a 1:21.670, as Massa pitted from behind him. Räikkönen, Hamilton and Kubica followed into the pit-lane on lap 47. Coulthard and Glock collided on lap 53 after the Toyota driver attempted to pass the Red Bull at the first corner. Glock sustained front wing damage, and Coulthard suffered a puncture to his left rear tyre; both pitted soon after for repairs.

Räikkönen took his second win of the season when he crossed the line at the end of the 66th lap, 3.2 seconds ahead of the second-placed Massa. Hamilton took third, ahead of Kubica, Webber and Button, who scored Honda's first points for the season. Nakajima finished in seventh place, ahead of Trulli, who was running in sixth place before his team mistakenly called him into the pit-lane. Toyota had mistaken Glock's damaged car for Trulli, dropping the latter down the order after the stop. Heidfeld, recovering after his penalty, finished in ninth place ahead of Fisichella. Glock and Coulthard filled the next two positions after their late collision, ahead of Sato in 13th. Rosberg, Alonso, Barrichello, Kovalainen, Davidson, Bourdais, Piquet, Vettel and Sutil were the retirements from a punishing Spanish Grand Prix.

=== Post-race ===
If we had wanted we could have gone a bit faster but there is no point to push it when you don't need to. I think it was closer than we expected but saying that there were many safety cars, so without them maybe it would have been looking a little bit different. It was a good day – everything was brilliant. I am happy that Heikki [Kovalainen] seems to be okay after his accident. I cannot ask anything more as the guys did perfect work.

— Kimi Räikkönen, speaking after the race.

The top three finishers appeared on the podium and in the subsequent press conference, where Räikkönen said his pole position start was an important factor in his victory: "This circuit is very difficult to overtake. The start is the best place and when you have a lot of things going with the safety car you might be lucky or very unlucky, so the best place to try to win is always from the front. It was good yesterday and it really helped us today."

Massa said that the result was a good one for his team, as they moved ahead of BMW Sauber in the Constructors' Championship: "We did our homework and brought two Ferrari's in the front – first and second – which is very important for the Championship." Although Ferrari had performed well, Massa said their speed was not significantly better than their opponents, so "we need to keep working like crazy in the factory to improve the car in every area."

Hamilton agreed that the start was the most important part of the race: "Obviously when we qualified fifth we knew that it would be very difficult to beat the Ferraris. But the key was to get a good start and make as many places as possible and fortunately I was able to do that." Apart from the start of the race, only two passing manoeuvres were recorded: Heidfeld's lap 55 pass on Fisichella and Coulthard's lap 61 pass on Sato.

Despite his accident, Kovalainen suffered no physical injuries, except for minor concussion. After spending the night under observation in a nearby hospital, the McLaren driver was cleared to race in the next Grand Prix, two weeks later. McLaren said that the wheel failure was due to a faulty wheel clamp which made it vulnerable to the rapid changes in load and pressure that a Formula One car endures, eventually leading to the deflated tyre and Kovalainen's accident. Kovalainen praised Formula One's safety procedures and medical staff:

It was a serious accident and I managed to walk away. I was a bit lucky, but the safety standards the FIA has been pushing worked very well, ... The chassis, the impact, all the barriers took the impact well, the FIA medical team plus the marshals and the team took the job very well and did a fantastic job to get me out of there quickly in a short period of time ... I was able to make a recovery without any injuries. I think it is something that we must still keep working on, but the work paid off that day.

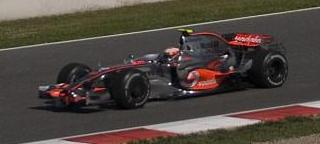
Heikki Kovalainen before his crash.

However, Mark Webber, a director of the Grand Prix Drivers' Association, said that standards at the track should have been better. Speaking in his regular BBC Online column, Webber said the "run-off on that corner is too tight and we need to have a look at it because any driver that has an error there is going to have a big crash. If Heikki's accident had happened two seconds later he would have been fine and controlled the car, but it probably happened on the worst section of that whole track."

Räikkönen's win increased his points tally in the Drivers' Championship to 29 points, nine ahead of second-placed Hamilton. Kubica and Massa were one and two points behind Hamilton, respectively; Heidfeld was fifth on 16 points, after failing to score. In the Constructors' Championship, Ferrari took the lead with 47 points, 12 points ahead of BMW Sauber and 13 points ahead of McLaren, with 14 races remaining in the season.

=== Race classification ===
Pos	No	Driver	Constructor	Laps	Time/Retired	Grid	Points
1	1	(Finland) Kimi Räikkönen	Ferrari	66	1:38:19.051	1	10
2	2	(Brazil) Felipe Massa	Ferrari	66	+ 3.228	3	8
3	22	(United Kingdom) Lewis Hamilton	McLaren-Mercedes	66	+ 4.187	5	6
4	4	(Poland) Robert Kubica	BMW Sauber	66	+ 5.694	4	5
5	10	(Australia) Mark Webber	Red Bull-Renault	66	+ 35.938	7	4
6	16	(United Kingdom) Jenson Button	Honda	66	+ 53.010	13	3
7	8	(Japan) Kazuki Nakajima	Williams-Toyota	66	+ 58.244	12	2
8	11	(Italy) Jarno Trulli	Toyota	66	+ 59.435	8	1
9	3	(Germany) Nick Heidfeld	BMW Sauber	66	+ 1:03.073	9	
10	21	(Italy) Giancarlo Fisichella	Force India-Ferrari	65	+ 1 lap	19	
11	12	(Germany) Timo Glock	Toyota	65	+ 1 lap	14	
12	9	(United Kingdom) David Coulthard	Red Bull-Renault	65	+ 1 lap	17	
13	18	(Japan) Takuma Sato	Super Aguri-Honda	65	+ 1 lap	22	
Ret	7	(Germany) Nico Rosberg	Williams-Toyota	41	Engine	15	
Ret	5	(Spain) Fernando Alonso	Renault	34	Engine	2	
Ret	17	(Brazil) Rubens Barrichello	Honda	34	Collision damage	11	
Ret	23	(Finland) Heikki Kovalainen	McLaren-Mercedes	21	Wheel rim/Crash	6	
Ret	19	(United Kingdom) Anthony Davidson	Super Aguri-Honda	8	Holed radiator	21	
Ret	14	(France) Sébastien Bourdais	Toro Rosso-Ferrari	7	Collision damage	16	
Ret	6	(Brazil) Nelson Piquet Jr.	Renault	6	Collision	10	
Ret	20	(Germany) Adrian Sutil	Force India-Ferrari	0	Collision	20	
Ret	15	(Germany) Sebastian Vettel	Toro Rosso-Ferrari	0	Collision	18	

== Championship standings after the race ==
Drivers' Championship standings

	Pos.	Driver	Points
	1	(Finland) Kimi Räikkönen	29
1	2	(United Kingdom) Lewis Hamilton	20
1	3	(Poland) Robert Kubica	19
2	4	(Brazil) Felipe Massa	18
3	5	(Germany) Nick Heidfeld	16

Constructors' Championship standings

	Pos.	Constructor	Points
1	1	(Italy) Ferrari	47
1	2	(Germany) BMW Sauber	35
	3	(United Kingdom) McLaren-Mercedes	34
	4	(United Kingdom) Williams-Toyota	12
	5	(Japan) Toyota	9

- Note: Only the top five positions are included for both sets of standings.

== See also ==
- 2008 Catalunya GP2 Series round

Previous race: 2008 Bahrain Grand Prix	FIA Formula One World Championship; 2008 season	Next race: 2008 Turkish Grand Prix
Previous race: 2007 Spanish Grand Prix	Spanish Grand Prix	Next race: 2009 Spanish Grand Prix
