= Ferrari V8 F1 engine =

Tipo DS50 2.5 L V8 engine Tipo 205/B 1.5 L V8 engine Tipo 056 2.4 L V8 engine
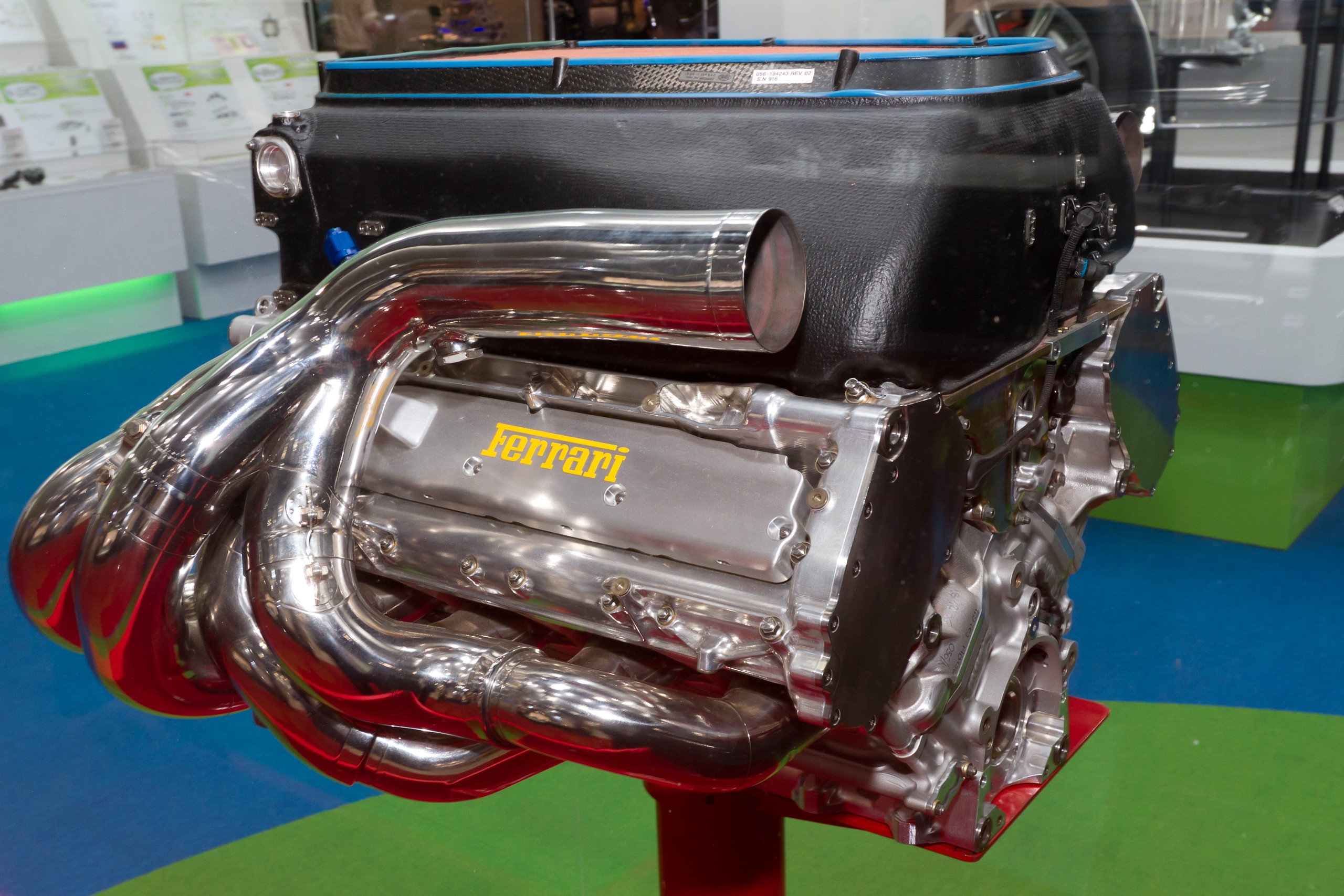

Overview
- Manufacturer: (Italy) Ferrari
- Designer: Vittorio Jano (1956–1958); Franco Rocchi (1964–1965); Angelo Bellei (1964–1965); Paolo Martinelli (Engine department director) (2006–2013); Gilles Simon (Chief designer) (2006–2013)
- Production: 1956–1958, 1964–1965, 2006–2013

Layout
- Configuration: 90° V8
- Displacement: 2.5 L (2,488 cc); 1.5 L (1,489 cc); 2.4 L (2,398 cc)
- Cylinder bore: 73.6 mm (2.9 in); 67 mm (2.6 in); 98 mm (3.9 in)
- Piston stroke: 73.1 mm (2.9 in); 52.8 mm (2.1 in); 39.75 mm (1.6 in)
- Compression ratio: 10.5:1–11.9:1 - 13.0:1/17.0:1

Combustion
- Fuel system: Carburetor/Electronic fuel injection
- Fuel type: Gasoline
- Cooling system: Water-cooled

Output
- Power output: 207–800 hp (154–597 kW; 210–811 PS)
- Torque output: approx. 120–243 lb⋅ft (163–329 N⋅m)

Dimensions
- Dry weight: approx. 95–130 kg (209.4–286.6 lb)

Chronology
- Predecessor: Ferrari V10 engine
- Successor: Ferrari V6 hybrid F1

Ferrari has manufactured three naturally-aspirated V8 racing engines, designed for Formula One racing. First, the Tipo DS50 engine introduced in 1956; with the 2.5 L engine configuration. Second, the Tipo 205/B engine, introduced in 1964; with the 1.5 L engine configuration; and was designed by Franco Rocchi and Angelo Bellei. Then, a 42-year hiatus; until the FIA imposed a 2.4 L engine V8 configuration for all Formula One teams in 2006, with Ferrari introducing their Tipo 056; designed by Gilles Simon.

== Tipo DS50 ==
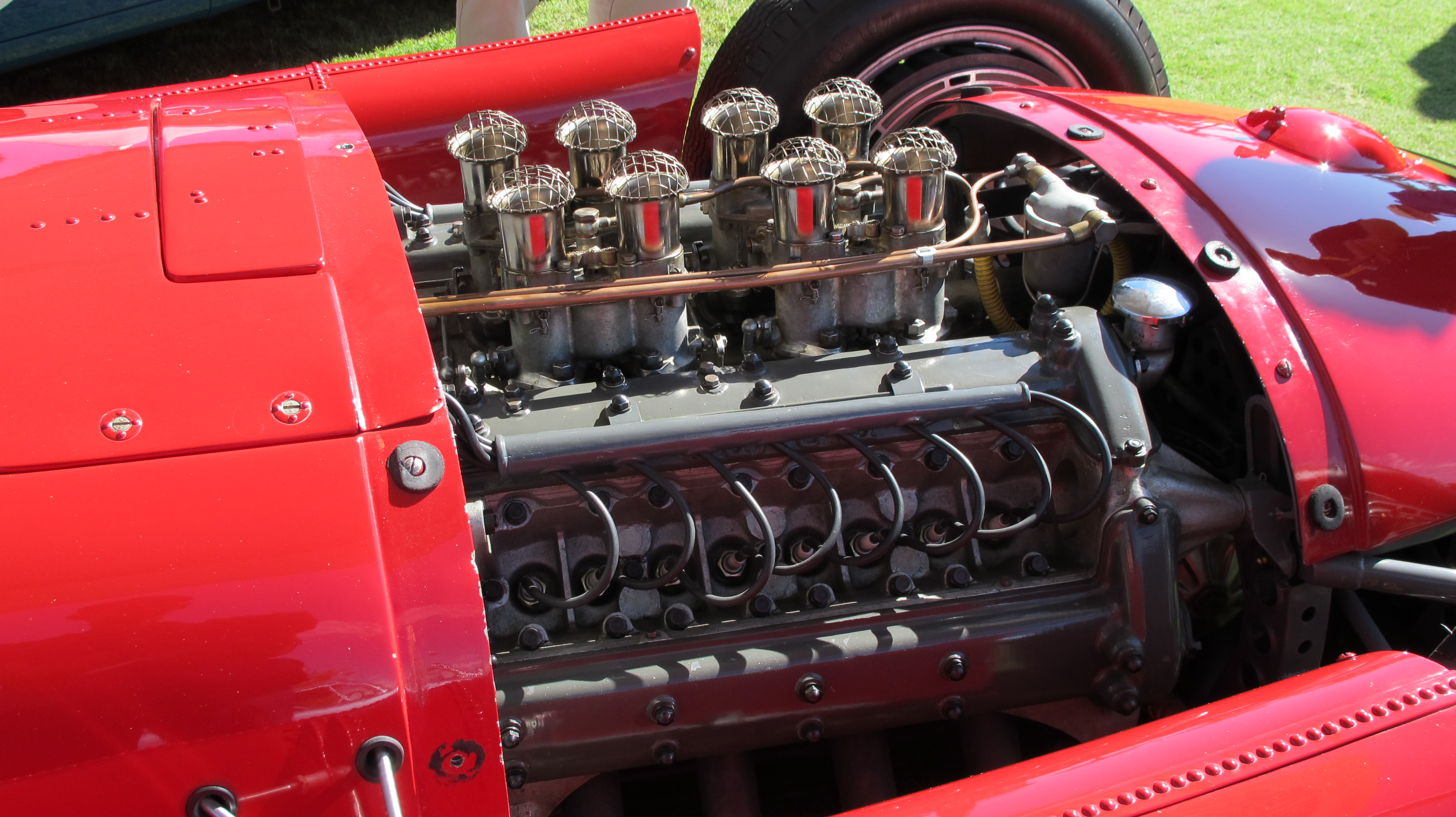
Tipo DS50 engine; used in the Ferrari D50.

The Tipo DS50 engine, used in the Ferrari D50, was introduced in 1954. This engine was a 2,488 cc (152 cu in), 90°, naturally aspirated, front-mounted V8; which produced between 260 bhp (194 kW) and 285 bhp (213 kW).

== Tipo 205/B ==
The Tipo 205/B engine developed 210 PS (154 kW; 207 hp) at 11,000 rpm; and had a bore and stroke of 67.0 mm × 52.8 mm (2.64 in × 2.08 in).

== Tipo 056 ==
Ferrari Type 056 was introduced by Ferrari, who used it in Formula 1 between 2006 and 2013. The V8 engine was developed under engine chief Paolo Martinelli and thus marked the return of Ferrari's usage of a V8 engine after a forty-year absence. Its predecessor is the Tipo 055 used in the 2005 season, successor type 059/3 from 2014.

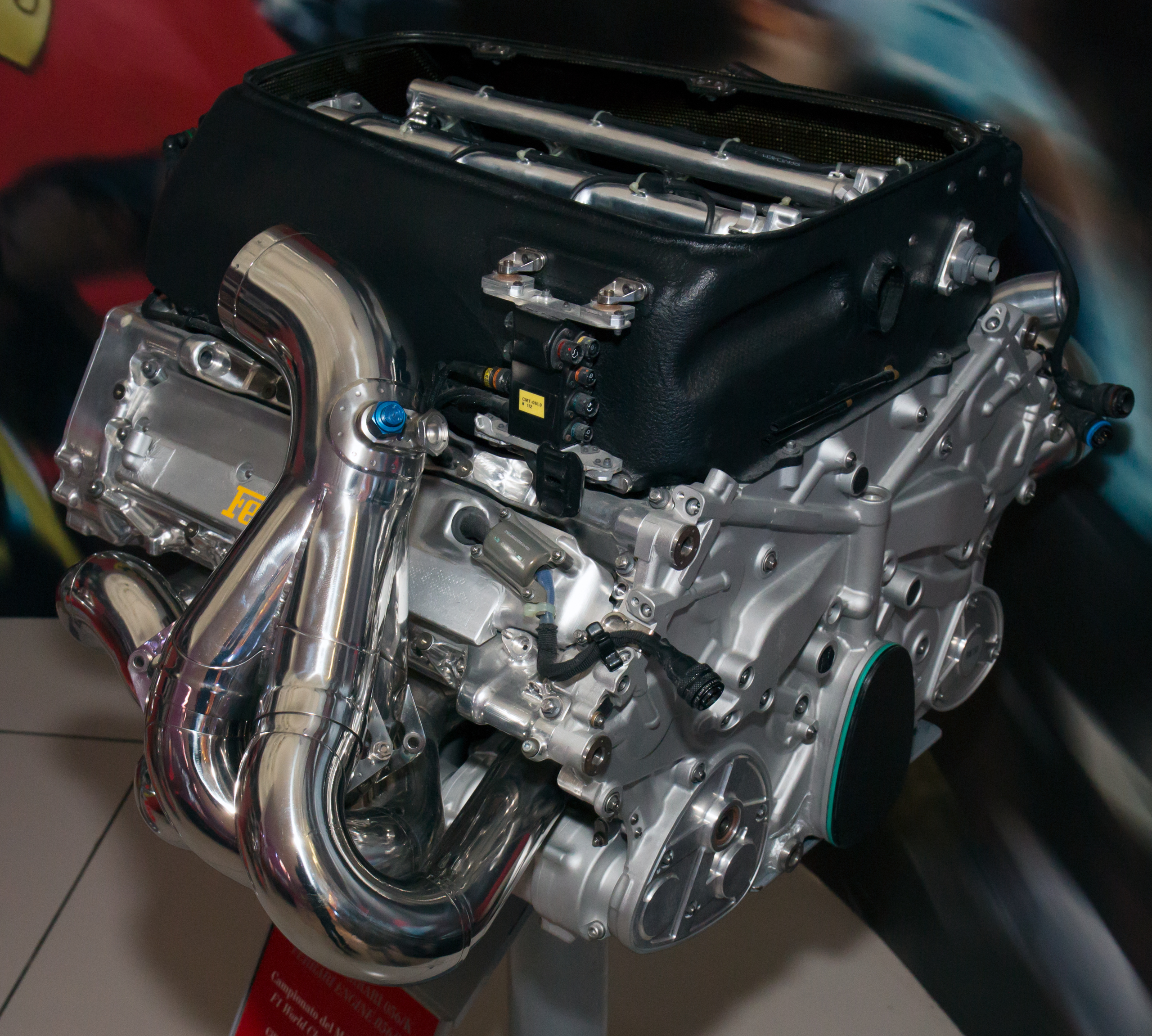
Ferrari Tipo 056 (2007).

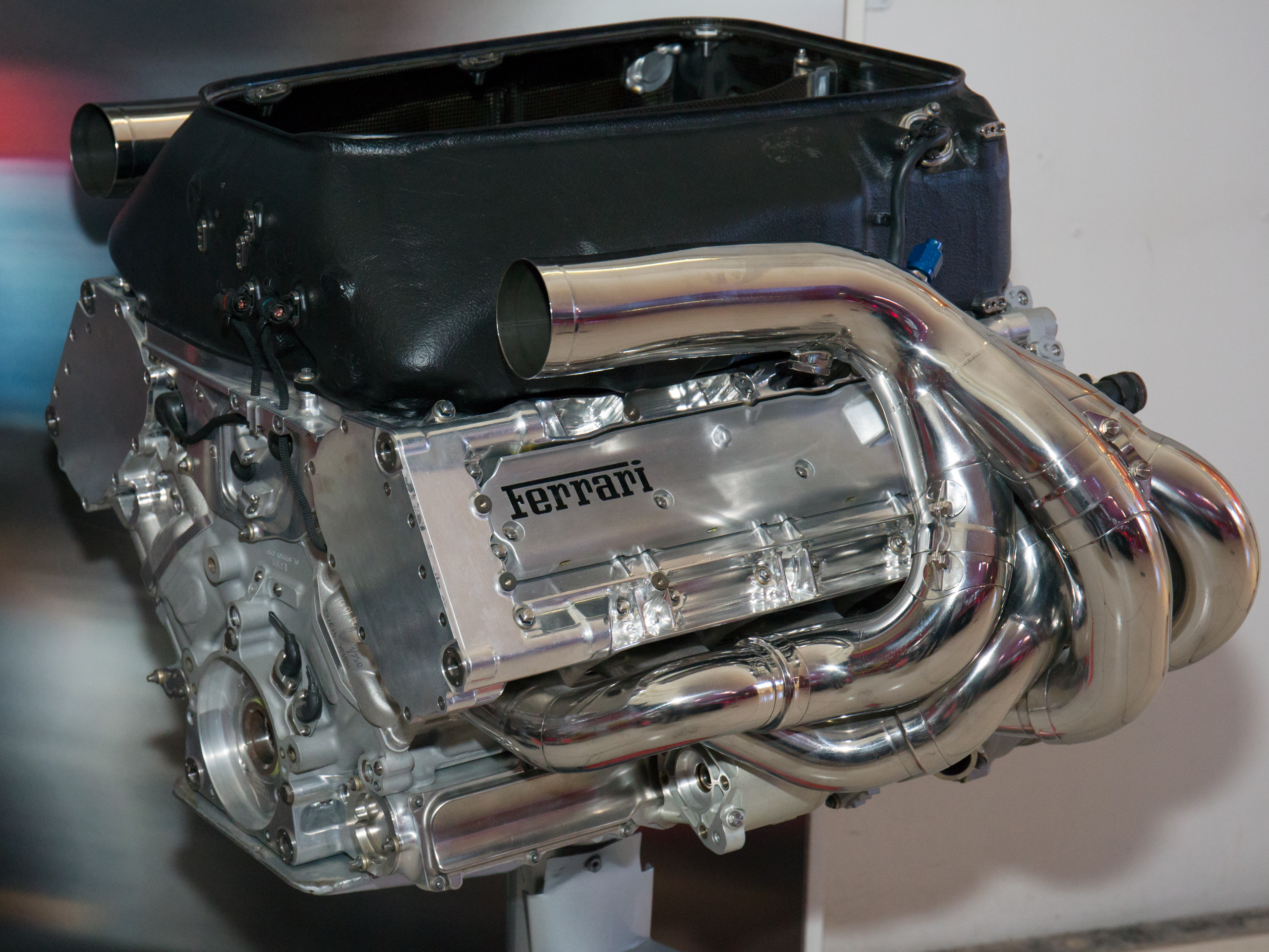
Ferrari Tipo 056 (2008).

=== Development ===
After the FIA had decided to introduce V8 engines from the 2006 season, Ferrari began developing such an engine for use in a Formula 1 car in mid-2004. In August 2005 the first test drives took place. For this purpose, the Tipo 056 was installed in a modified F2004. The road car engine department helped develop the Tipo 056. The engine management was by Magneti Marelli.

=== Usage ===
Ferrari used the engine from 2006 to 2013. In the 2009 and 2011 to 2013 seasons, Ferrari used the Tipo 056 in conjunction with KERS.

Red Bull also used the engine in 2006, but sourced its engines from Renault from the next season.

Scuderia Toro Rosso drove the Type 056 from 2007 to 2013, with KERS in the 2011 and 2013 seasons.

Spyker built the Type 056 in 2007, its successor Force India in 2008. For the 2009 season, Force India switched to Mercedes as the engine supplier.

From the 2010 to 2013 season, Sauber also obtained its engines from Ferrari. Sauber used KERS from the 2011 season.

On the very first race weekend in Bahrain in 2006, Michael Schumacher secured pole position in the Ferrari 248 F1 with the Tipo 056. The first victory followed three races later at the San Marino Grand Prix, also by Schumacher. Fernando Alonso 's last victory with the Tipo 056 came at the 2013 Spanish Grand Prix. The most victories per season were nine, which was achieved three times with the Type 056 – in 2006, 2007, and 2008.

The Tipo 056 claimed 39 victories in 147 races (including 38 by Ferrari and one by Toro Rosso). Its drivers took 29 pole positions and set the fastest laps in 48 races. A driver with Tipo 056 stood on the podium 122 times. With him, Ferrari won a drivers' and two constructors' world championships.

=== Specifications ===
Weight: 95 kg
Configuration: 90° V8
Valves: 4 per cylinder
Bore: 98mm
Stroke: 39.75mm
Displacement: 2.4 liters
No. of revolutions: Max. 19,000 rpm
Exhaust: Two outlet pipes
Power output: ~ 597 kW (801 hp)
Torque output: ~ 325 N⋅m (240 lb⋅ft)

== Types ==
- Tipo DS50 (1955–1957): 2,488 cc (152 cu in) - 250 hp (186 kW) at 8,100 rpm
- Tipo 205/B (1964–1965): 1,489 cc (90.9 cu in) - 207 hp (154 kW) at 11,000 rpm
- Tipo 056 (2006–2013): 2,398 cc (146.3 cu in) - 735–800 hp (548–597 kW) at 18,000-19,000 rpm

== Applications ==
- Ferrari D50
- Ferrari 158
- Ferrari 248 F1
- Ferrari F2007
- Ferrari F2008
- Ferrari F60
- Ferrari F10
- Ferrari 150º Italia
- Ferrari F2012
- Ferrari F138
- Red Bull RB2
- Toro Rosso STR2
- Toro Rosso STR3
- Toro Rosso STR4
- Toro Rosso STR5
- Toro Rosso STR6
- Toro Rosso STR7
- Toro Rosso STR8
- Spyker F8-VII / Force India VJM01
- Sauber C29
- Sauber C30
- Sauber C31
- Sauber C32

== Formula One World Championship results ==
- 3 World Constructors' Championships
- 3 World Drivers' Championships
- 47 race wins
- 51 fastest laps
- 143 podium finishes
