= Toro Rosso Grand Prix results =

These are the complete Grand Prix racing results for Scuderia Toro Rosso.

== Complete Formula One results ==
(key)

Year	Chassis	Engine	Tyres	Drivers	1	2	3	4	5	6	7	8	9	10	11	12	13	14	15	16	17	18	19	20	21	Points	WCC
2006	STR1	Cosworth TJ2005 3.0 V10	MI		BHR	MAL	AUS	SMR	EUR	ESP	MON	GBR	CAN	USA	FRA	GER	HUN	TUR	ITA	CHN	JPN	BRA				1	9th
2006	STR1	Cosworth TJ2005 3.0 V10	MI	(Italy) Vitantonio Liuzzi	11	11	Ret	14	Ret	15^{†}	10	13	13	8	13	10	Ret	Ret	14	10	14	13				1	9th
2006	STR1	Cosworth TJ2005 3.0 V10	MI	(United States) Scott Speed	13	Ret	9	15	11	Ret	13	Ret	10	Ret	10	12	11	13	13	14	18^{†}	11				1	9th
2007	STR2	Ferrari 056 2.4 V8	B		AUS	MAL	BHR	ESP	MON	CAN	USA	FRA	GBR	EUR	HUN	TUR	ITA	BEL	JPN	CHN	BRA					8	7th
2007	STR2	Ferrari 056 2.4 V8	B	(Italy) Vitantonio Liuzzi	14	17	Ret	Ret	Ret	Ret	17^{†}	Ret	16^{†}	Ret	Ret	15	17	12	9	6	13					8	7th
2007	STR2	Ferrari 056 2.4 V8	B	(United States) Scott Speed	Ret	14	Ret	Ret	9	Ret	13	Ret	Ret	Ret												8	7th
2007	STR2	Ferrari 056 2.4 V8	B	(Germany) Sebastian Vettel											16	19	18	Ret	Ret	4	Ret					8	7th
2008	STR2B	Ferrari 056 2.4 V8	B		AUS	MAL	BHR	ESP	TUR	MON	CAN	FRA	GBR	GER	HUN	EUR	BEL	ITA	SIN	JPN	CHN	BRA				39	6th
2008	STR2B	Ferrari 056 2.4 V8	B	(France) Sébastien Bourdais	7^{†}	Ret	15	Ret	Ret																	39	6th
2008	STR2B	Ferrari 056 2.4 V8	B	(Germany) Sebastian Vettel	Ret	Ret	Ret	Ret	17																	39	6th
2008	STR3	Ferrari 056 2.4 V8	B	(France) Sébastien Bourdais						Ret	13	17	11	12	18	10	7	18	12	10	13	14				39	6th
2008	STR3	Ferrari 056 2.4 V8	B	(Germany) Sebastian Vettel						5	8	12	Ret	8	Ret	6	5	1^{P}	5	6	9	4				39	6th
2009	STR4	Ferrari 056 2.4 V8	B		AUS	MAL	CHN	BHR	ESP	MON	TUR	GBR	GER	HUN	EUR	BEL	ITA	SIN	JPN	BRA	ABU					8	10th
2009	STR4	Ferrari 056 2.4 V8	B	(France) Sébastien Bourdais	8	10	11	13	Ret	8	18	Ret	Ret													8	10th
2009	STR4	Ferrari 056 2.4 V8	B	(Spain) Jaime Alguersuari										15	16	Ret	Ret	Ret	Ret	14	Ret					8	10th
2009	STR4	Ferrari 056 2.4 V8	B	(Switzerland) Sébastien Buemi	7	16^{†}	8	17	Ret	Ret	15	18	16	16	Ret	12	13^{†}	Ret	Ret	7	8					8	10th
2010	STR5	Ferrari 056 2.4 V8	B		BHR	AUS	MAL	CHN	ESP	MON	TUR	CAN	EUR	GBR	GER	HUN	BEL	ITA	SIN	JPN	KOR	BRA	ABU			13	9th
2010	STR5	Ferrari 056 2.4 V8	B	(Spain) Jaime Alguersuari	13	11	9	13	10	11	12	12	13	Ret	15	Ret	13	15	12	11	11	11	9			13	9th
2010	STR5	Ferrari 056 2.4 V8	B	(Switzerland) Sébastien Buemi	16^{†}	Ret	11	Ret	Ret	10	16	8	9	12	Ret	12	12	11	14	10	Ret	13	15			13	9th
2011	STR6	Ferrari 056 2.4 V8	P		AUS	MAL	CHN	TUR	ESP	MON	CAN	EUR	GBR	GER	HUN	BEL	ITA	SIN	JPN	KOR	IND	ABU	BRA			41	8th
2011	STR6	Ferrari 056 2.4 V8	P	(Spain) Jaime Alguersuari	11	14	Ret	16	16	Ret	8	8	10	12	10	Ret	7	21^{†}	15	7	8	15	11			41	8th
2011	STR6	Ferrari 056 2.4 V8	P	(Switzerland) Sébastien Buemi	8	13	14	9	14	10	10	13	Ret	15	8	Ret	10	12	Ret	9	Ret	Ret	12			41	8th
2012	STR7	Ferrari 056 2.4 V8	P		AUS	MAL	CHN	BHR	ESP	MON	CAN	EUR	GBR	GER	HUN	BEL	ITA	SIN	JPN	KOR	IND	ABU	USA	BRA		26	9th
2012	STR7	Ferrari 056 2.4 V8	P	(Australia) Daniel Ricciardo	9	12	17	15	13	Ret	14	11	13	13	15	9	12	9	10	9	13	10	12	13		26	9th
2012	STR7	Ferrari 056 2.4 V8	P	(France) Jean-Éric Vergne	11	8	16	14	12	12	15	Ret	14	14	16	8	Ret	Ret	13	8	15	12	Ret	8		26	9th
2013	STR8	Ferrari 056 2.4 V8	P		AUS	MAL	CHN	BHR	ESP	MON	CAN	GBR	GER	HUN	BEL	ITA	SIN	KOR	JPN	IND	ABU	USA	BRA			33	8th
2013	STR8	Ferrari 056 2.4 V8	P	(Australia) Daniel Ricciardo	Ret	18^{†}	7	16	10	Ret	15	8	12	13	10	7	Ret	19^{†}	13	10	16	11	10			33	8th
2013	STR8	Ferrari 056 2.4 V8	P	(France) Jean-Éric Vergne	12	10	12	Ret	Ret	8	6	Ret	Ret	12	12	Ret	14	18^{†}	12	13	17	16	15			33	8th
2014	STR9	Renault Energy F1-2014 1.6 V6 t	P		AUS	MAL	BHR	CHN	ESP	MON	CAN	AUT	GBR	GER	HUN	BEL	ITA	SIN	JPN	RUS	USA	BRA	ABU			30	7th
2014	STR9	Renault Energy F1-2014 1.6 V6 t	P	(Russia) Daniil Kvyat	9	10	11	10	14	Ret	Ret	Ret	9	Ret	14	9	11	14	11	14	15	11	Ret			30	7th
2014	STR9	Renault Energy F1-2014 1.6 V6 t	P	(France) Jean-Éric Vergne	8	Ret	Ret	12	Ret	Ret	8	Ret	10	13	9	11	13	6	9	13	10	13	12			30	7th
2015	STR10	Renault Energy F1-2015 1.6 V6 t	P		AUS	MAL	CHN	BHR	ESP	MON	CAN	AUT	GBR	HUN	BEL	ITA	SIN	JPN	RUS	USA	MEX	BRA	ABU			67	7th
2015	STR10	Renault Energy F1-2015 1.6 V6 t	P	(Spain) Carlos Sainz Jr.	9	8	13	Ret	9	10	12	Ret	Ret	Ret	Ret	11	9	10	Ret	7	13	Ret	11			67	7th
2015	STR10	Renault Energy F1-2015 1.6 V6 t	P	(Netherlands) Max Verstappen	Ret	7	17^{†}	Ret	11	Ret	15	8	Ret	4	8	12	8	9	10	4	9	9	16			67	7th
2016	STR11	Ferrari 060 1.6 V6 t	P		AUS	BHR	CHN	RUS	ESP	MON	CAN	EUR	AUT	GBR	HUN	GER	BEL	ITA	SIN	MAL	JPN	USA	MEX	BRA	ABU	63	7th
2016	STR11	Ferrari 060 1.6 V6 t	P	(Spain) Carlos Sainz Jr.	9	Ret	9	12	6	8	9	Ret	8	8	8	14	Ret	15	14	11	17	6	16	6	Ret	63	7th
2016	STR11	Ferrari 060 1.6 V6 t	P	(Netherlands) Max Verstappen	10	6	8	Ret																		63	7th
2016	STR11	Ferrari 060 1.6 V6 t	P	(Russia) Daniil Kvyat					10^{F}	Ret	12	Ret	Ret	10	16	15	14	Ret	9	14	13	11	18	13	Ret	63	7th
2017	STR12	Toro Rosso 1.6 V6 t	P		AUS	CHN	BHR	RUS	ESP	MON	CAN	AZE	AUT	GBR	HUN	BEL	ITA	SIN	MAL	JPN	USA	MEX	BRA	ABU		53	7th
2017	STR12	Toro Rosso 1.6 V6 t	P	(Russia) Daniil Kvyat	9	Ret	12	12	9	14^{†}	Ret	Ret	16	15	11	12	12	Ret			10					53	7th
2017	STR12	Toro Rosso 1.6 V6 t	P	(Spain) Carlos Sainz Jr.	8	7	Ret	10	7	6	Ret	8	Ret	Ret	7	10	14	4	Ret	Ret						53	7th
2017	STR12	Toro Rosso 1.6 V6 t	P	(France) Pierre Gasly															14	13		13	12	16		53	7th
2017	STR12	Toro Rosso 1.6 V6 t	P	(New Zealand) Brendon Hartley																	13	Ret	Ret	15		53	7th
2018	STR13	Honda RA618H 1.6 V6 t	P		AUS	BHR	CHN	AZE	ESP	MON	CAN	FRA	AUT	GBR	GER	HUN	BEL	ITA	SIN	RUS	JPN	USA	MEX	BRA	ABU	33	9th
2018	STR13	Honda RA618H 1.6 V6 t	P	(France) Pierre Gasly	Ret	4	18	12	Ret	7	11	Ret	11	13	14	6	9	14	13	Ret	11	12	10	13	Ret	33	9th
2018	STR13	Honda RA618H 1.6 V6 t	P	(New Zealand) Brendon Hartley	15	17	20^{†}	10	12	19^{†}	Ret	14	Ret	Ret	10	11	14	Ret	17	Ret	13	9	14	11	12	33	9th
2019	STR14	Honda RA619H 1.6 V6 t	P		AUS	BHR	CHN	AZE	ESP	MON	CAN	FRA	AUT	GBR	GER	HUN	BEL	ITA	SIN	RUS	JPN	MEX	USA	BRA	ABU	85	6th
2019	STR14	Honda RA619H 1.6 V6 t	P	(Thailand) Alexander Albon	14	9	10	11	11	8	Ret	15	15	12	6	10										85	6th
2019	STR14	Honda RA619H 1.6 V6 t	P	(France) Pierre Gasly													9	11	8	14	7	9	16^{†}	2	18	85	6th
2019	STR14	Honda RA619H 1.6 V6 t	P	(Russia) Daniil Kvyat	10	12	Ret	Ret	9	7	10	14	17	9	3	15	7	Ret	15	12	10	11	12	10	9	85	6th

Notes

- ^{†} – The driver did not finish the Grand Prix, but was classified as he completed over 90% of the race distance.
