= Ferrari engine customers' Grand Prix results =

The table below details the Grand Prix results of the other teams for which Ferrari was/is an engine supplier.

== Complete Formula One World Championship results ==
=== First supplies (1956–1966) ===
(key)

Year	Entrant	Chassis	Engine	Tyres	Drivers	1	2	3	4	5	6	7	8	9	10	Points	WCC
1956	Bardahl-Ferrari	Kurtis Kraft 500D	446 4.5 L6	F		ARG	MON	500	BEL	FRA	GBR	GER	ITA			—N/a^{1}	
1956	Bardahl-Ferrari	Kurtis Kraft 500D	446 4.5 L6	F	(Italy) Giuseppe Farina			DNQ								—N/a^{1}	
1956	Bardahl-Ferrari	Kurtis Kraft 500D	446 4.5 L6	F	(United States) Johnny Baldwin			DNQ								—N/a^{1}	
1957–1959: Ferrari did not supply engines to other teams.
1960	Fred Armbruster	Cooper T51	107 2.5 L4	D		ARG	MON	500	NED	BEL	FRA	GBR	POR	ITA	USA	0	NC
1960	Fred Armbruster	Cooper T51	107 2.5 L4	D	(United States) Pete Lovely										11	0	NC
1961–1962: Ferrari did not supply engines to other teams.
1963	Scuderia Settecolli	De Tomaso F1	178 1.5 V6	D		MON	BEL	NED	FRA	GBR	GER	ITA	USA	MEX	RSA	0	NC
1963	Scuderia Settecolli	De Tomaso F1	178 1.5 V6	D	(Italy) Roberto Lippi							DNQ				0	NC
1964–1965: Ferrari did not supply engines to other teams.
1966	J.A. Pearce Engineering	Cooper T73	Tipo 168 3.0 V12	D		MON	BEL	FRA	GBR	NED	GER	ITA	USA	MEX		0	NC
1966	J.A. Pearce Engineering	Cooper T73	Tipo 168 3.0 V12	D	(United Kingdom) Chris Lawrence				11		Ret					0	NC
1967–1990: Ferrari did not supply engines to other teams.

=== Support of the fellow Italian teams (1991–1993) ===
(key)

Year	Entrant	Chassis	Engine	Tyres	Drivers	1	2	3	4	5	6	7	8	9	10	11	12	13	14	15	16	Points	WCC
1991	Minardi Team	Minardi M191	037 3.5 V12	G		USA	BRA	SMR	MON	CAN	MEX	FRA	GBR	GER	HUN	BEL	ITA	POR	ESP	JPN	AUS	6	7th
1991	Minardi Team	Minardi M191	037 3.5 V12	G	(Italy) Pierluigi Martini	9	Ret	4	12	7	Ret	9	9	Ret	Ret	12	Ret	4	13	Ret	Ret	6	7th
1991	Minardi Team	Minardi M191	037 3.5 V12	G	(Italy) Gianni Morbidelli	Ret	8	Ret	Ret	Ret	7	Ret	11	Ret	13	Ret	9	9	14	Ret		6	7th
1991	Minardi Team	Minardi M191	037 3.5 V12	G	(Brazil) Roberto Moreno																16	6	7th
1992	Scuderia Italia	Dallara 192	037 3.5 V12	G		RSA	MEX	BRA	ESP	SMR	MON	CAN	FRA	GBR	GER	HUN	BEL	ITA	POR	JPN	AUS	2	10th
1992	Scuderia Italia	Dallara 192	037 3.5 V12	G	(Finland) JJ Lehto	Ret	8	8	Ret	11	9	9	9	13	10	DNQ	7	11	Ret	9	Ret	2	10th
1992	Scuderia Italia	Dallara 192	037 3.5 V12	G	(Italy) Pierluigi Martini	Ret	Ret	Ret	6	6	Ret	8	10	15	11	Ret	Ret	8	Ret	10	Ret	2	10th
1993	Lola BMS Scuderia Italia	Lola T93/30	040 3.5 V12	G		RSA	BRA	EUR	SMR	ESP	MON	CAN	FRA	GBR	GER	HUN	BEL	ITA	POR	JPN	AUS	0	NC
1993	Lola BMS Scuderia Italia	Lola T93/30	040 3.5 V12	G	(Italy) Michele Alboreto	Ret	11	11	DNQ	DNQ	Ret	DNQ	DNQ	DNQ	16	Ret	14	Ret	Ret			0	NC
1993	Lola BMS Scuderia Italia	Lola T93/30	040 3.5 V12	G	(Italy) Luca Badoer	Ret	12	DNQ	7	Ret	DNQ	15	Ret	Ret	Ret	Ret	13	10	14			0	NC
1994–2005: Ferrari did not supply Ferrari-badged engines to other teams.

=== Return to the role of supplier (2006–2009) ===
(key)

Year	Entrant	Chassis	Engine	Tyres	Drivers	1	2	3	4	5	6	7	8	9	10	11	12	13	14	15	16	17	18	Points	WCC
2006	Red Bull Racing	Red Bull RB2	056 2.4 V8	M		BHR	MAL	AUS	SMR	EUR	ESP	MON	GBR	CAN	USA	FRA	GER	HUN	TUR	ITA	CHN	JPN	BRA	16	7th
2006	Red Bull Racing	Red Bull RB2	056 2.4 V8	M	(United Kingdom) David Coulthard	10	Ret	8	Ret	Ret	14	3	12	8	7	9	11	5	15	12	9	Ret	Ret	16	7th
2006	Red Bull Racing	Red Bull RB2	056 2.4 V8	M	(Austria) Christian Klien	8	Ret	Ret	Ret	Ret	13	Ret	14	11	Ret	12	8	Ret	11	11				16	7th
2006	Red Bull Racing	Red Bull RB2	056 2.4 V8	M	(Netherlands) Robert Doornbos																12	13	12	16	7th
2007	Scuderia Toro Rosso	Toro Rosso STR2	056 2.4 V8	B		AUS	MAL	BHR	ESP	MON	CAN	USA	FRA	GBR	EUR	HUN	TUR	ITA	BEL	JPN	CHN	BRA		8	7th
2007	Scuderia Toro Rosso	Toro Rosso STR2	056 2.4 V8	B	(Italy) Vitantonio Liuzzi	14	17	Ret	Ret	Ret	Ret	17	Ret	16	Ret	Ret	15	17	12	9	6	13		8	7th
2007	Scuderia Toro Rosso	Toro Rosso STR2	056 2.4 V8	B	(United States) Scott Speed	Ret	14	Ret	Ret	9	Ret	13	Ret	Ret	Ret									8	7th
2007	Scuderia Toro Rosso	Toro Rosso STR2	056 2.4 V8	B	(Germany) Sebastian Vettel											16	19	18	Ret	Ret	4	Ret		8	7th
2007	Etihad Aldar Spyker F1 Team	Spyker F8-VII; Spyker F8-VIIB	056 2.4 V8	B	(Germany) Adrian Sutil	17	Ret	15	13	Ret	Ret	14	17	Ret	Ret	17	21	19	14	8	Ret	Ret		1	10th
2007	Etihad Aldar Spyker F1 Team	Spyker F8-VII; Spyker F8-VIIB	056 2.4 V8	B	(Netherlands) Christijan Albers	Ret	Ret	14	14	19	Ret	15	Ret	15										1	10th
2007	Etihad Aldar Spyker F1 Team	Spyker F8-VII; Spyker F8-VIIB	056 2.4 V8	B	(Germany) Markus Winkelhock										Ret									1	10th
2007	Etihad Aldar Spyker F1 Team	Spyker F8-VII; Spyker F8-VIIB	056 2.4 V8	B	(Japan) Sakon Yamamoto											Ret	20	20	17	12	17	Ret		1	10th
2008	Scuderia Toro Rosso	Toro Rosso STR2B; Toro Rosso STR3	056 2.4 V8	B		AUS	MAL	BHR	ESP	TUR	MON	CAN	FRA	GBR	GER	HUN	EUR	BEL	ITA	SIN	JPN	CHN	BRA	39	6th
2008	Scuderia Toro Rosso	Toro Rosso STR2B; Toro Rosso STR3	056 2.4 V8	B	(France) Sébastien Bourdais	7^{†}	Ret	15	Ret	Ret	Ret	13	17	11	12	18	10	7	18	12	10	13	14	39	6th
2008	Scuderia Toro Rosso	Toro Rosso STR2B; Toro Rosso STR3	056 2.4 V8	B	(Germany) Sebastian Vettel	Ret	Ret	Ret	Ret	17	5	8	12	Ret	8	Ret	6	5	1^{P}	5	6	9	4	39	6th
2008	Force India F1 Team	Force India VJM01	056 2.4 V8	B	(Germany) Adrian Sutil	Ret	Ret	19	Ret	16	Ret	Ret	19	Ret	15	Ret	Ret	13	19	Ret	Ret	Ret	16	0	10th
2008	Force India F1 Team	Force India VJM01	056 2.4 V8	B	(Italy) Giancarlo Fisichella	Ret	12	12	10	Ret	Ret	Ret	18	Ret	16	15	14	17	Ret	14	Ret	17	18	0	10th
2009	Scuderia Toro Rosso	Toro Rosso STR4	056 2.4 V8	B		AUS	MAL	CHN	BHR	ESP	MON	TUR	GBR	GER	HUN	EUR	BEL	ITA	SIN	JPN	BRA	ABU		8	10th
2009	Scuderia Toro Rosso	Toro Rosso STR4	056 2.4 V8	B	(France) Sébastien Bourdais	8	10	11	13	Ret	8	18	Ret	Ret										8	10th
2009	Scuderia Toro Rosso	Toro Rosso STR4	056 2.4 V8	B	(Spain) Jaime Alguersuari										15	16	Ret	Ret	Ret	Ret	14	Ret		8	10th
2009	Scuderia Toro Rosso	Toro Rosso STR4	056 2.4 V8	B	(Switzerland) Sébastien Buemi	7	16	8	17	Ret	Ret	15	18	16	16	Ret	12	13	Ret	Ret	7	8		8	10th

=== 2010s ===
(key)

Year	Entrant	Chassis	Engine	Tyres	Drivers	1	2	3	4	5	6	7	8	9	10	11	12	13	14	15	16	17	18	19	20	21	Points	WCC
2010	BMW Sauber F1 Team	Sauber C29	056 2.4 V8	B		BHR	AUS	MAL	CHN	ESP	MON	TUR	CAN	EUR	GBR	GER	HUN	BEL	ITA	SIN	JPN	KOR	BRA	ABU			44	8th
2010	BMW Sauber F1 Team	Sauber C29	056 2.4 V8	B	(Spain) Pedro de la Rosa	Ret	12	DNS	Ret	Ret	Ret	11	Ret	12	Ret	14	7	11	14								44	8th
2010	BMW Sauber F1 Team	Sauber C29	056 2.4 V8	B	(Germany) Nick Heidfeld															Ret	8	9	17	11			44	8th
2010	BMW Sauber F1 Team	Sauber C29	056 2.4 V8	B	(Japan) Kamui Kobayashi	Ret	Ret	Ret	Ret	12	Ret	10	Ret	7	6	11	9	8	Ret	Ret	7	8	10	14			44	8th
2010	Scuderia Toro Rosso	Toro Rosso STR5	056 2.4 V8	B	(Switzerland) Sébastien Buemi	16	Ret	11	Ret	Ret	10	16	8	9	12	Ret	12	12	11	14	10	Ret	13	15			13	9th
2010	Scuderia Toro Rosso	Toro Rosso STR5	056 2.4 V8	B	(Spain) Jaime Alguersuari	13	11	9	13	10	11	12	12	13	Ret	15	Ret	13	15	12	11	11	11	9			13	9th
2011	Sauber F1 Team	Sauber C30	056 2.4 V8	P		AUS	MAL	CHN	TUR	ESP	MON	CAN	EUR	GBR	GER	HUN	BEL	ITA	SIN	JPN	KOR	IND	ABU	BRA			44	7th
2011	Sauber F1 Team	Sauber C30	056 2.4 V8	P	(Japan) Kamui Kobayashi	DSQ	7	10	10	10	5	7	16	Ret	9	11	12	Ret	14	13	15	Ret	10	9			44	7th
2011	Sauber F1 Team	Sauber C30	056 2.4 V8	P	(Mexico) Sergio Pérez	DSQ	Ret	17	14	9	DNS	PO	11	7	11	15	Ret	Ret	10	8	16	10	11	13			44	7th
2011	Sauber F1 Team	Sauber C30	056 2.4 V8	P	(Spain) Pedro de la Rosa							12															44	7th
2011	Scuderia Toro Rosso	Toro Rosso STR6	056 2.4 V8	P	(Switzerland) Sébastien Buemi	8	13	14	9	14	10	10	13	Ret	15	8	Ret	10	12	Ret	9	Ret	Ret	12			41	8th
2011	Scuderia Toro Rosso	Toro Rosso STR6	056 2.4 V8	P	(Spain) Jaime Alguersuari	11	14	Ret	16	16	Ret	8	8	10	12	10	Ret	7	21	15	7	8	15	11			41	8th
2012	Sauber F1 Team	Sauber C31	056 2.4 V8	P		AUS	MAL	CHN	BHR	ESP	MON	CAN	EUR	GBR	GER	HUN	BEL	ITA	SIN	JPN	KOR	IND	ABU	USA	BRA		126	6th
2012	Sauber F1 Team	Sauber C31	056 2.4 V8	P	(Japan) Kamui Kobayashi	6	Ret	10^{F}	13	5	Ret	9	Ret	11	4	18^{†}	13	9	13	3	Ret	14	6	14	9		126	6th
2012	Sauber F1 Team	Sauber C31	056 2.4 V8	P	(Mexico) Sergio Pérez	8	2	11	11	Ret	11^{F}	3	9	Ret	6	14	Ret	2	10	Ret	11	Ret	15	11	Ret		126	6th
2012	Scuderia Toro Rosso	Toro Rosso STR7	056 2.4 V8	P	(Australia) Daniel Ricciardo	9	12	17	15	13	Ret	14	11	13	13	15	9	12	9	10	9	13	10	12	13		26	9th
2012	Scuderia Toro Rosso	Toro Rosso STR7	056 2.4 V8	P	(France) Jean-Éric Vergne	11	8	16	14	12	12	15	Ret	14	14	16	8	Ret	Ret	13	8	15	12	Ret	8		26	9th
2013	Sauber F1 Team	Sauber C32	056 2.4 V8	P		AUS	MAL	CHN	BHR	ESP	MON	CAN	GBR	GER	HUN	BEL	ITA	SIN	KOR	JPN	IND	ABU	USA	BRA			57	7th
2013	Sauber F1 Team	Sauber C32	056 2.4 V8	P	(Germany) Nico Hülkenberg	DNS	8	10	12	15	11	Ret	10	10	11	13	5	9	4	6	19^{†}	14	6	8			57	7th
2013	Sauber F1 Team	Sauber C32	056 2.4 V8	P	(Mexico) Esteban Gutiérrez	13	12	Ret	18	11^{F}	13	20^{†}	14	14	Ret	14	13	12	11	7	15	13	13	12			57	7th
2013	Scuderia Toro Rosso	Toro Rosso STR8	056 2.4 V8	P	(France) Jean-Éric Vergne	12	10	12	Ret	Ret	8	6	Ret	Ret	12	12	Ret	14	18^{†}	12	13	17	16	15			33	8th
2013	Scuderia Toro Rosso	Toro Rosso STR8	056 2.4 V8	P	(Australia) Daniel Ricciardo	Ret	18	7	16	10	Ret	15	8	12	13	10	7	Ret	19^{†}	13	10	16	11	10			33	8th
2014	Marussia F1 Team	Marussia MR03	059/3 1.6 V6 t	P		AUS	MAL	BHR	CHN	ESP	MON	CAN	AUT	GBR	GER	HUN	BEL	ITA	SIN	JPN	RUS	USA	BRA	ABU			2	9th
2014	Marussia F1 Team	Marussia MR03	059/3 1.6 V6 t	P	(United Kingdom) Max Chilton	13	15	13	19	19	14	Ret	17	16	17	16	16	Ret	17	18	Ret						2	9th
2014	Marussia F1 Team	Marussia MR03	059/3 1.6 V6 t	P	(France) Jules Bianchi	NC	Ret	16	17	18	9	Ret	15	14	15	15	18^{†}	18	16	20^{†}							2	9th
2014	Marussia F1 Team	Marussia MR03	059/3 1.6 V6 t	P	(United States) Alexander Rossi												PO				WD						2	9th
2014	Sauber F1 Team	Sauber C33	059/3 1.6 V6 t	P	(Mexico) Esteban Gutiérrez	12	Ret	Ret	16	16	Ret	14^{†}	19	Ret	14	Ret	15	20	Ret	13	15	14	14	15			0	10th
2014	Sauber F1 Team	Sauber C33	059/3 1.6 V6 t	P	(Germany) Adrian Sutil	11	Ret	Ret	Ret	17	Ret	13	13	13	Ret	11	14	15	Ret	21^{†}	16	Ret	16	16			0	10th
2015	Sauber F1 Team	Sauber C34	060 1.6 V6 t	P		AUS	MAL	CHN	BHR	ESP	MON	CAN	AUT	GBR	HUN	BEL	ITA	SIN	JPN	RUS	USA	MEX	BRA	ABU			36	8th
2015	Sauber F1 Team	Sauber C34	060 1.6 V6 t	P	(Sweden) Marcus Ericsson	8	Ret	10	14	14	13	14	13	11	10	10	9	11	14	Ret	Ret	12	16	14			36	8th
2015	Sauber F1 Team	Sauber C34	060 1.6 V6 t	P	(Brazil) Felipe Nasr	5	12	8	12	12	9	16	11	DNS	11	11	13	10	20^{†}	6	9	Ret	13	15			36	8th
2015	Manor Marussia F1 Team	Marussia MR03B	059/3 1.6 V6 t	P	(United Kingdom) Will Stevens	DNP	DNS	15	16	17	17	17	Ret	13	16^{†}	16	15	15	19	14	Ret	16	17	18			0	10th
2015	Manor Marussia F1 Team	Marussia MR03B	059/3 1.6 V6 t	P	(Spain) Roberto Merhi	DNP	15	16	17	18	16	Ret	14	12	15	15	16			13				19			0	10th
2015	Manor Marussia F1 Team	Marussia MR03B	059/3 1.6 V6 t	P	(United States) Alexander Rossi													14	18		12	15	18				0	10th
2016	Scuderia Toro Rosso	Toro Rosso STR11	060 1.6 V6 t	P		AUS	BHR	CHN	RUS	ESP	MON	CAN	EUR	AUT	GBR	HUN	GER	BEL	ITA	SIN	MAL	JPN	USA	MEX	BRA	ABU	63	7th
2016	Scuderia Toro Rosso	Toro Rosso STR11	060 1.6 V6 t	P	(Netherlands) Max Verstappen	10	6	8	Ret																		63	7th
2016	Scuderia Toro Rosso	Toro Rosso STR11	060 1.6 V6 t	P	(Russia) Daniil Kvyat					10^{F}	Ret	12	Ret	Ret	10	16	15	14	Ret	9	14	13	11	18	13	Ret	63	7th
2016	Scuderia Toro Rosso	Toro Rosso STR11	060 1.6 V6 t	P	(Spain) Carlos Sainz Jr.	9	Ret	9	12	6	8	9	Ret	8	8	8	14	Ret	15	14	11	17	6	16	6	Ret	63	7th
2016	Haas F1 Team	Haas VF-16	061 1.6 V6 t	P	(France) Romain Grosjean	6	5	19	8	Ret	13	14	13	7	Ret	14	13	13	11	DNS	Ret	11	10	20	DNS	11	29	8th
2016	Haas F1 Team	Haas VF-16	061 1.6 V6 t	P	(Mexico) Esteban Gutiérrez	Ret	Ret	14	17	11	11	13	16	11	16	13	11	12	13	11	Ret	20	Ret	19	Ret	12	29	8th
2016	Sauber F1 Team	Sauber C35	061 1.6 V6 t	P	(Sweden) Marcus Ericsson	Ret	12	16	14	12	Ret	15	17	15	Ret	20	18	Ret	16	17	12	15	14	11	Ret	15	2	10th
2016	Sauber F1 Team	Sauber C35	061 1.6 V6 t	P	(Brazil) Felipe Nasr	15	14	20	16	14	Ret	18	12	13	15	17	Ret	17	Ret	13	Ret	19	15	15	9	16	2	10th
2017	Haas F1 Team	Haas VF-17	062 1.6 V6 t	P		AUS	CHN	BHR	RUS	ESP	MON	CAN	AZE	AUT	GBR	HUN	BEL	ITA	SIN	MAL	JPN	USA	MEX	BRA	ABU		47	8th
2017	Haas F1 Team	Haas VF-17	062 1.6 V6 t	P	(France) Romain Grosjean	Ret	11	8	Ret	10	8	10	13	6	13	Ret	7	15	9	13	9	14	15	15	11		47	8th
2017	Haas F1 Team	Haas VF-17	062 1.6 V6 t	P	(Denmark) Kevin Magnussen	Ret	8	Ret	13	14	10	12	7	Ret	12	13	15	11	Ret	12	8	16	8	Ret	13		47	8th
2017	Sauber F1 Team	Sauber C36	061 1.6 V6 t	P	(Sweden) Marcus Ericsson	Ret	15	Ret	15	11	Ret	13	11	15	14	16	16	18^{†}	Ret	18	Ret	15	Ret	13	17		5	10th
2017	Sauber F1 Team	Sauber C36	061 1.6 V6 t	P	(Germany) Pascal Wehrlein	WD		11	16	8	Ret	15	10	14	17	15	Ret	16	12	17	15	Ret	14	14	14		5	10th
2017	Sauber F1 Team	Sauber C36	061 1.6 V6 t	P	(Italy) Antonio Giovinazzi	12	Ret																				5	10th
2018	Haas F1 Team	Haas VF-18	062 EVO 1.6 V6 t	P		AUS	BHR	CHN	AZE	ESP	MON	CAN	FRA	AUT	GBR	GER	HUN	BEL	ITA	SIN	RUS	JPN	USA	MEX	BRA	ABU	93	5th
2018	Haas F1 Team	Haas VF-18	062 EVO 1.6 V6 t	P	(France) Romain Grosjean	Ret	13	17	Ret	Ret	15	12	11	4	Ret	6	10	7	DSQ	15	11	8	Ret	16	8	9	93	5th
2018	Haas F1 Team	Haas VF-18	062 EVO 1.6 V6 t	P	(Denmark) Kevin Magnussen	Ret	5	10	13	6	13	13	6	5	9	11	7	8	16	18^{F}	8	Ret	DSQ	15	9	10	93	5th
2018	Alfa Romeo Sauber F1 Team	Sauber C37	062 EVO 1.6 V6 t	P	(Sweden) Marcus Ericsson	Ret	9	16	11	13	11	15	13	10	Ret	9	15	10	15	11	13	12	10	9	Ret	Ret	48	8th
2018	Alfa Romeo Sauber F1 Team	Sauber C37	062 EVO 1.6 V6 t	P	(Monaco) Charles Leclerc	13	12	19	6	10	18^{†}	10	10	9	Ret	15	Ret	Ret	11	9	7	Ret	Ret	7	7	7	48	8th
2019	Alfa Romeo Racing	Alfa Romeo Racing C38	064 1.6 V6 t	P		AUS	BHR	CHN	AZE	ESP	MON	CAN	FRA	AUT	GBR	GER	HUN	BEL	ITA	SIN	RUS	JPN	MEX	USA	BRA	ABU	57	8th
2019	Alfa Romeo Racing	Alfa Romeo Racing C38	064 1.6 V6 t	P	(Finland) Kimi Räikkönen	8	7	9	10	14	17	15	7	9	8	12	7	16	15	Ret	13	12	Ret	11	4	13	57	8th
2019	Alfa Romeo Racing	Alfa Romeo Racing C38	064 1.6 V6 t	P	(Italy) Antonio Giovinazzi	15	11	15	12	16	19	13	16	10	Ret	13	18	18^{†}	9	10	15	14	14	14	5	16	57	8th
2019	Rich Energy Haas F1 Team	Haas VF-19	064 1.6 V6 t	P	(France) Romain Grosjean	Ret	Ret	11	Ret	10	10	14	Ret	16	Ret	7	Ret	13	16	11	Ret	13	17	15	13	15	28	9th
2019	Rich Energy Haas F1 Team	Haas VF-19	064 1.6 V6 t	P	(Denmark) Kevin Magnussen	6	13	13	13	7	14	17	17	19	Ret	8	13	12	Ret	17^{F}	9	15	15	18^{†}	11	14	28	9th

=== 2020s ===
(key)

Year	Entrant	Chassis	Engine	Tyres	Drivers	1	2	3	4	5	6	7	8	9	10	11	12	13	14	15	16	17	18	19	20	21	22	23	24	Points	WCC
2020	Alfa Romeo Racing Orlen	Alfa Romeo Racing C39	065 1.6 V6 t	P		AUT	STY	HUN	GBR	70A	ESP	BEL	ITA	TUS	RUS	EIF	POR	EMI	TUR	BHR	SKH	ABU								8	8th
2020	Alfa Romeo Racing Orlen	Alfa Romeo Racing C39	065 1.6 V6 t	P	(Finland) Kimi Räikkönen	Ret	11	15	17	15	14	12	13	9	14	12	11	9	15	15	14	12								8	8th
2020	Alfa Romeo Racing Orlen	Alfa Romeo Racing C39	065 1.6 V6 t	P	(Italy) Antonio Giovinazzi	9	14	17	14	17	16	Ret	16	Ret	11	10	15	10	Ret	16	13	16								8	8th
2020	Haas F1 Team	Haas VF-20	065 1.6 V6 t	P	(France) Romain Grosjean	Ret	13	16	16	16	19	15	12	12	17	9	17	14	Ret	Ret										3	9th
2020	Haas F1 Team	Haas VF-20	065 1.6 V6 t	P	(Brazil) Pietro Fittipaldi																17	19								3	9th
2020	Haas F1 Team	Haas VF-20	065 1.6 V6 t	P	(Denmark) Kevin Magnussen	Ret	12	10	Ret	Ret	15	17	Ret	Ret	12	13	16	Ret	17†	17	15	18								3	9th
2021	Alfa Romeo Racing Orlen	Alfa Romeo Racing C41	065/6 1.6 V6 t	P		BHR	EMI	POR	ESP	MON	AZE	FRA	STY	AUT	GBR	HUN	BEL	NED	ITA	RUS	TUR	USA	MXC	SAP	QAT	SAU	ABU			13	9th
2021	Alfa Romeo Racing Orlen	Alfa Romeo Racing C41	065/6 1.6 V6 t	P	(Finland) Kimi Räikkönen	11	13	Ret	12	11	10	17	11	15	15	10	18	WD		8	12	13	8	12	14	15	Ret			13	9th
2021	Alfa Romeo Racing Orlen	Alfa Romeo Racing C41	065/6 1.6 V6 t	P	(Poland) Robert Kubica													15	14											13	9th
2021	Alfa Romeo Racing Orlen	Alfa Romeo Racing C41	065/6 1.6 V6 t	P	(Italy) Antonio Giovinazzi	12	14	12	15	10	11	15	15	14	13	13	13	14	13	16	11	11	11	14	15	9	Ret			13	9th
2021	Uralkali Haas F1 Team	Haas VF-21	065/6 1.6 V6 t	P	Nikita Mazepin	Ret	17	19	19	17	14	20	18	19	17	Ret	17	Ret	Ret	18	20	17	18	17	18	Ret	WD			0	10th
2021	Uralkali Haas F1 Team	Haas VF-21	065/6 1.6 V6 t	P	(Germany) Mick Schumacher	16	16	17	18	18	13	19	16	18	18	12	16	18	15	Ret	19	16	Ret	18	16	Ret	14			0	10th
2022	Alfa Romeo F1 Team Orlen	Alfa Romeo C42	066/7 1.6 V6 t	P		BHR	SAU	AUS	EMI	MIA	ESP	MON	AZE	CAN	GBR	AUT	FRA	HUN	BEL	NED	ITA	SIN	JPN	USA	MXC	SAP	ABU			55	6th
2022	Alfa Romeo F1 Team Orlen	Alfa Romeo C42	066/7 1.6 V6 t	P	(Finland) Valtteri Bottas	6	Ret	8	5^{7}	7	6	9	11	7	Ret	11	14	20†	Ret	Ret	13	11	15	Ret	10	9	15			55	6th
2022	Alfa Romeo F1 Team Orlen	Alfa Romeo C42	066/7 1.6 V6 t	P	(China) Zhou Guanyu	10	11	11	15	Ret	Ret	16	Ret	8	Ret	14	16†	13	14	16	10	Ret	16^{F}	12	13	12	12			55	6th
2022	Haas F1 Team	Haas VF-22	066/7 1.6 V6 t	P	(Denmark) Kevin Magnussen	5	9	14	9^{8}	16†	17	Ret	Ret	17	10	8^{7}	Ret	16	16	15	16	12	14	9	17	Ret^{P 8}	17			37	8th
2022	Haas F1 Team	Haas VF-22	066/7 1.6 V6 t	P	(Germany) Mick Schumacher	11	WD	13	17	15	14	Ret	14	Ret	8	6	15	14	17	13	12	13	17	15	16	13	16			37	8th
2023	Alfa Romeo F1 Team Stake	Alfa Romeo C43	066/10 1.6 V6 t	P		BHR	SAU	AUS	AZE	MIA	MON	ESP	CAN	AUT	GBR	HUN	BEL	NED	ITA	SIN	JPN	QAT	USA	MXC	SAP	LVG	ABU			16	9th
2023	Alfa Romeo F1 Team Stake	Alfa Romeo C43	066/10 1.6 V6 t	P	(Finland) Valtteri Bottas	8	18	11	18	13	11	19	10	15	12	12	12	14	10	Ret	Ret	8	12	15	Ret	17	19			16	9th
2023	Alfa Romeo F1 Team Stake	Alfa Romeo C43	066/10 1.6 V6 t	P	(China) Zhou Guanyu	16^{F}	13	9	Ret	16	13	9	16	12	15	16	13	Ret	14	12	13	9	13	14	Ret	15	17			16	9th
2023	MoneyGram Haas F1 Team	Haas VF-23	066/10 1.6 V6 t	P	(Germany) Nico Hülkenberg	15	12	7	17	15	17	15	15	Ret^{6}	13	14	18	12	17	13	14	16	11	13	12	19†	15			12	10th
2023	MoneyGram Haas F1 Team	Haas VF-23	066/10 1.6 V6 t	P	(Denmark) Kevin Magnussen	13	10	17†	13	10	19†	18	17	18	Ret	17	15	16	18	10	15	14	14	Ret	Ret	13	20			12	10th
2024	MoneyGram Haas F1 Team	Haas VF-24	066/12 1.6 V6 t	P		BHR	SAU	AUS	JPN	CHN	MIA	EMI	MON	CAN	ESP	AUT	GBR	HUN	BEL	NED	ITA	AZE	SIN	USA	MXC	SAP	LVG	QAT	ABU	58	7th
2024	MoneyGram Haas F1 Team	Haas VF-24	066/12 1.6 V6 t	P	(Germany) Nico Hülkenberg	16	10	9	11	10	11^{7}	11	Ret	11	11	6	6	13	18	11	17	11	9	8^{8}	9	DSQ	8	Ret^{7}	8	58	7th
2024	MoneyGram Haas F1 Team	Haas VF-24	066/12 1.6 V6 t	P	(Denmark) Kevin Magnussen	12	12	10	13	16	19	12	Ret	12	17	8	12	15	14	18	10		19†	11^{7}	7	WD	12	9	16^{F}	58	7th
2024	MoneyGram Haas F1 Team	Haas VF-24	066/12 1.6 V6 t	P	(United Kingdom) Oliver Bearman																	10				12				58	7th
2024	Stake F1 Team Kick Sauber	Kick Sauber C44	066/12 1.6 V6 t	P	(Finland) Valtteri Bottas	19	17	14	14	Ret	16	18	13	13	16	16	15	16	15	19	16	16	16	17	14	13	18	11	Ret	4	10th
2024	Stake F1 Team Kick Sauber	Kick Sauber C44	066/12 1.6 V6 t	P	(China) Zhou Guanyu	11	18	15	Ret	14	14	15	16	15	13	17	18	19	Ret	20	18	14	15	19	15	15	13	8	13	4	10th
2025	MoneyGram Haas F1 Team	Haas VF-25	066/12 1.6 V6 t	P		AUS	CHN	JPN	BHR	SAU	MIA	EMI	MON	ESP	CAN	AUT	GBR	BEL	HUN	NED	ITA	AZE	SIN	USA	MXC	SAP	LVG	QAT	ABU	79	8th
2025	MoneyGram Haas F1 Team	Haas VF-25	066/12 1.6 V6 t	P	(France) Esteban Ocon	13	5	18	8	14	12	Ret	7	16	9	10	13	15^{5}	16	10	15	14	18	15	9	12	9	15	7	79	8th
2025	MoneyGram Haas F1 Team	Haas VF-25	066/12 1.6 V6 t	P	(United Kingdom) Oliver Bearman	14	8	10	10	13	Ret	17	12	17	11	11	11	11^{7}	Ret	6	12	12	9	9	4	6	10	Ret	12	79	8th
2025	Stake F1 Team Kick Sauber	Kick Sauber C45	066/12 1.6 V6 t	P	(Brazil) Gabriel Bortoleto	Ret	14	19	18	18	Ret	18	14	12	14	8	Ret	9	6	15	8	11	17	18	10	Ret	Ret	13	11	70	9th
2025	Stake F1 Team Kick Sauber	Kick Sauber C45	066/12 1.6 V6 t	P	(Germany) Nico Hülkenberg	7	15	16	DSQ	15	14	12	16	5	8	9	3	12	13	14	DNS	16	20	8	Ret	9	7	Ret	9	70	9th
2026	Cadillac F1 Team	Cadillac MAC-26	067/6 1.6 V6 t	P		AUS	CHN	JPN	MIA	CAN	MON	BCN	AUT	GBR	BEL	HUN	NED	ITA	ESP	AZE	BHR	SIN	USA	MXC	SAP	LVG	QAT	ABU		0*	11th*
2026	Cadillac F1 Team	Cadillac MAC-26	067/6 1.6 V6 t	P	(Finland) Valtteri Bottas	Ret	13	19	18	16	Ret	Ret	Ret	16	18	Ret	Ret	19	18	16†	Ret	19	Ret	Ret	DNS	18				0*	11th*
2026	Cadillac F1 Team	Cadillac MAC-26	067/6 1.6 V6 t	P	(Mexico) Sergio Pérez	16	15	17	16	Ret	15	14	Ret	14	Ret	Ret	15	18	Ret	14	19	17	19	16	18	Ret				0*	11th*
2026	TGR Haas F1 Team	Haas VF-26	067/6 1.6 V6 t	P	(United Kingdom) Oliver Bearman	7	5^{8}	Ret	11	10	Ret	17†	14	12	14	19	Ret	15	16	9	14	12^{6}	Ret	Ret	17	13				31*	7th*
2026	TGR Haas F1 Team	Haas VF-26	067/6 1.6 V6 t	P	(France) Esteban Ocon	11	14	10	13	14	9	13	16	13	17	16	Ret	16	11	8	15	13	14	WD						31*	7th*
2026	TGR Haas F1 Team	Haas VF-26	067/6 1.6 V6 t	P	(Japan) Ryo Hirakawa																			10						31*	7th*
2026	TGR Haas F1 Team	Haas VF-26	067/6 1.6 V6 t	P	(Brazil) Rafael Câmara																				20	16				31*	7th*

Notes

- * – Season still in progress.
- ^{†} – The driver did not finish the Grand Prix, but was classified, as he completed over 90% of the race distance.
- ^{1} – The World Constructors' Championship did not exist before 1958.
