= Ben Butler (engineer) =

British Formula One engineer

- Occupation: Engineer
- Years active: 1998-2015
- Employer: Red Bull Advanced Technologies
- Known for: Formula One engineer
- Title: Chief Designer

Ben Butler is a British Formula One and motorsports engineer. He is currently the chief designer for Red Bull Advanced Technologies.

== Career ==
Butler began his engineering career at Lotus Cars in 1992, working in the powertrain design group on a range of road-car and OEM projects, including development work related to the Lotus Esprit and General Motors’ L850 engine programme. In 1998 he moved into Formula One with Stewart Grand Prix, where he worked as a mechanical designer on gearbox, hydraulic and suspension components for the SF2 and SF3 chassis.

Following Ford’s transition of the team into Jaguar Racing, Butler continued as a gearbox designer, remaining with the Milton Keynes operation until 2005. He then joined the newly formed Red Bull Racing organisation as a trackside reliability engineer, contributing to early Red Bull chassis programmes as the team established itself following its acquisition of Jaguar.

In 2007 Butler was appointed Head of Design for Red Bull’s second team project, overseeing installation and integration work for Scuderia Toro Rosso. He later became Chief Designer at Toro Rosso when design and development was brought back to Faenza. He led the car design for the STR5, STR6 and STR7 chassis between 2009 and 2012.

He subsequently returned to Red Bull as Head of F1 Customer Projects, managing technical relationships and vehicle supply programmes before moving to Red Bull Advanced Technologies as Chief Designer in 2015. In this role, Butler has overseen specialist engineering initiatives and cross-programme development within Red Bull’s Advanced Technology Division.
