= Toro Rosso STR5 =

2010 Formula One racing car

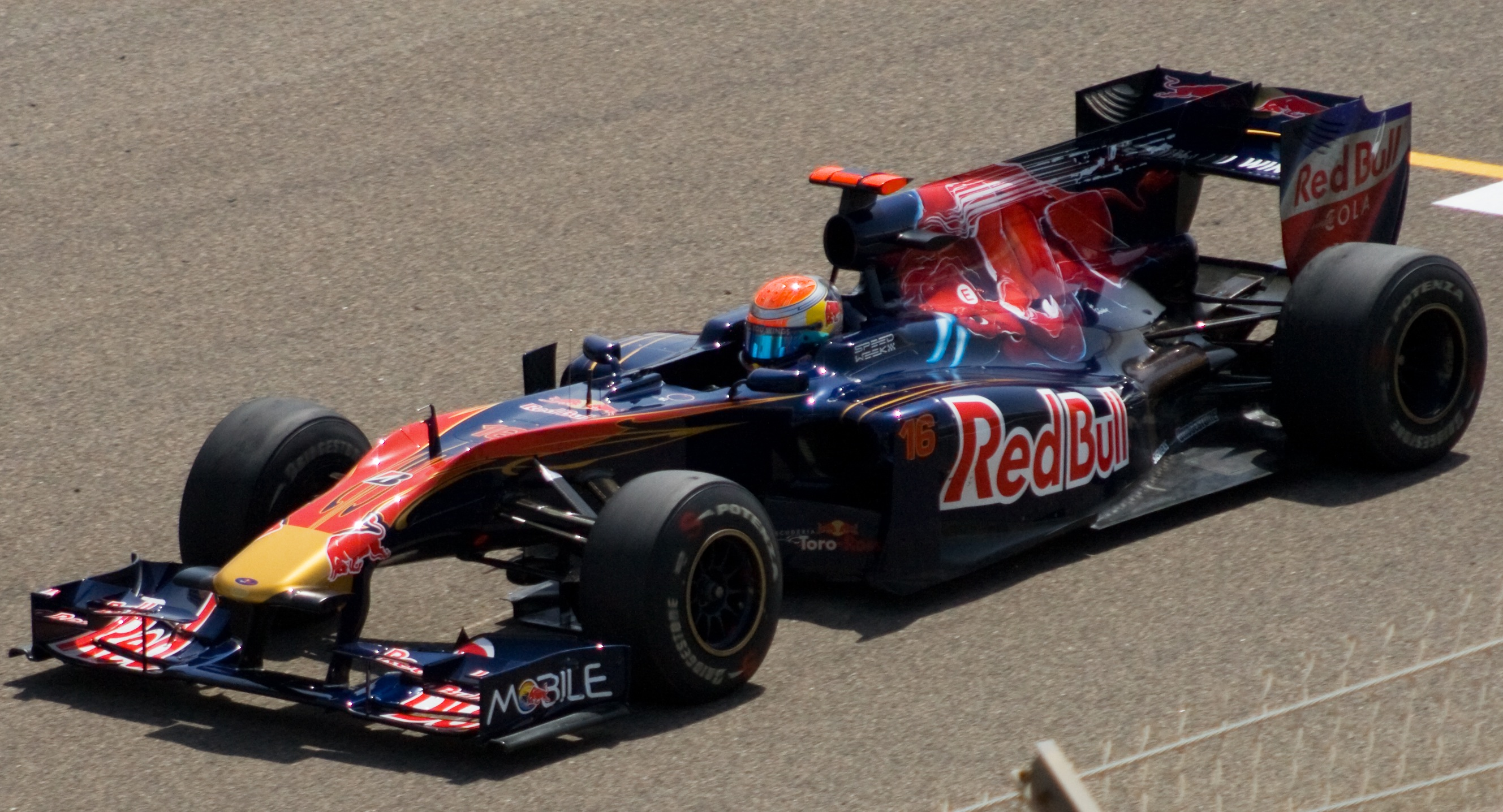
- Sébastien Buemi driving the STR5 at the Bahrain Grand Prix
- Category: Formula One
- Constructor: Toro Rosso
- Designers: Giorgio Ascanelli (Technical Director); Ben Butler (Chief Designer); Laurent Mekies (Chief Engineer); Paolo Marabini (Chief Engineer, R&D and Structures); Matteo Piraccini (Chief Engineer, Systems); Nicolò Petrucci (Head of Aerodynamics)
- Predecessor: Toro Rosso STR4
- Successor: Toro Rosso STR6

Technical specifications
- Chassis: carbon-fibre and honeycomb composite monocoque
- Suspension (front): Upper and lower carbon wishbones, torsion bar springs and anti-roll bars, Sachs dampers
- Suspension (rear): as front
- Engine: Ferrari Type 056 (2009-spec) 2,400 cc (146.5 cu in) 90° V8, limited to 18,000 RPM naturally aspirated mid-mounted
- Transmission: Seven-speed semi-automatic gearbox with reverse gear
- Weight: 620 kg (1,367 lb) (including driver)
- Fuel: Shell V-Power
- Tyres: Bridgestone Potenza; Advanti Wheels (front and rear): 13"

Competition history
- Notable entrants: Scuderia Toro Rosso
- Notable drivers: 16. (Switzerland) Sébastien Buemi; 17. (Spain) Jaime Alguersuari
- Debut: 2010 Bahrain Grand Prix
- Last event: 2010 Abu Dhabi Grand Prix
| Races | Wins | Podiums | Poles | F/Laps |
|---|---|---|---|---|
| 19 | 0 | 0 | 0 | 0 |

The Toro Rosso STR5 was a Formula One motor racing car designed and built by Scuderia Toro Rosso for the 2010 season. The car was a significant change for the team as it represented the first chassis they had indigenously-designed and built on their own in Faenza, Italy; prior to 2010, the car was identical to that of parent team Red Bull Racing, circumventing a ban on customer chassis by having both cars designed by a third party. The car, driven by an unchanged lineup from 2009 of Sébastien Buemi and Jaime Alguersuari, was unveiled at the first official test of 2010 on February 1, at the Circuit Ricardo Tormo in Valencia.

The Toro Rosso STR5 utilized the 2009-spec Ferrari 056 V8 engines instead of 2010-spec.

== Season summary ==
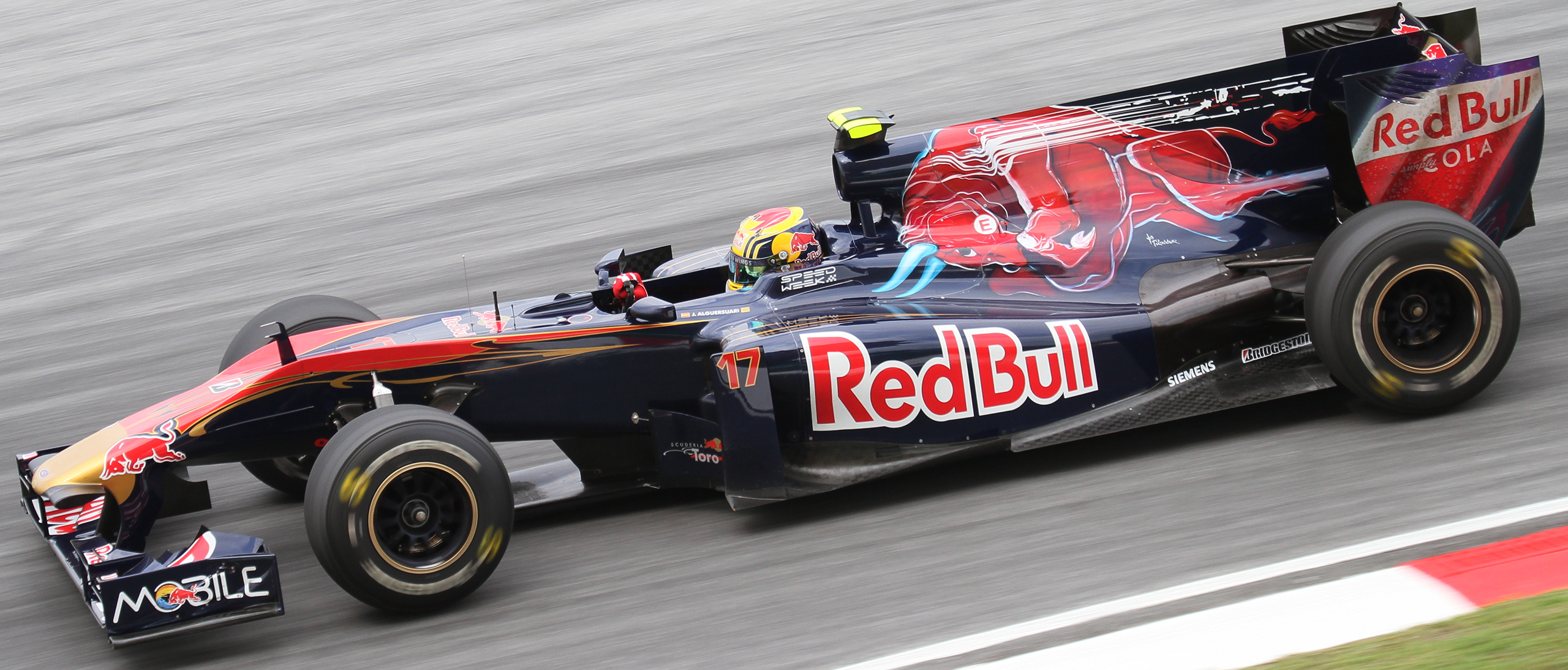
Alguersuari scored his first points at the Malaysian Grand Prix; becoming the second-youngest driver to score championship points.

The STR5 struggled throughout the 2010 season with a small number of retirements. On 19 occasions did a STR5 cross the finish line of a Grand Prix, with Buemi chalking up 5 retirements in 19 races, failing to finish a Grand Prix in Australia, China, Spain, Germany and South Korea. Alguersuari meanwhile fared slightly better with 2 retirements. Alguersuari chalked up the first points of the season in Round 3 at Sepang, Malaysia with a 9th place finish. Buemi would score the team's next 7 points with 10th place finishes at the Monaco and Japanese Grand Prix, 8th finish at Canadian Grand Prix and 9th finish at European Grand Prix. Alguersuari added the team's final point at the final Grand Prix of the season in Abu Dhabi.

At the end of the season, Buemi and Alguersuari finished 16th and 19th in the Drivers' Championship respectively, while Toro Rosso finished ninth in the Constructors' Championship, their 13 points being their lowest tally for the second season running.

== Sponsorship and livery ==
The car features a classic dark blue and red livery, with a design of a charging red bull on the engine cover. The sponsors displayed by Toro Rosso in 2010 included brands such as: the soft drink Red Bull Cola, positioned on the sides of the rear wing; the mobile operator Red Bull Mobile, located on the front wing endplates and the main plane of the rear wing; the news website Speed Week, placed next to the Red Bull logo on the sidepods where the logo of the electronics company Siemens also appears; and finally, on the nose cone, the logo of Bridgestone.

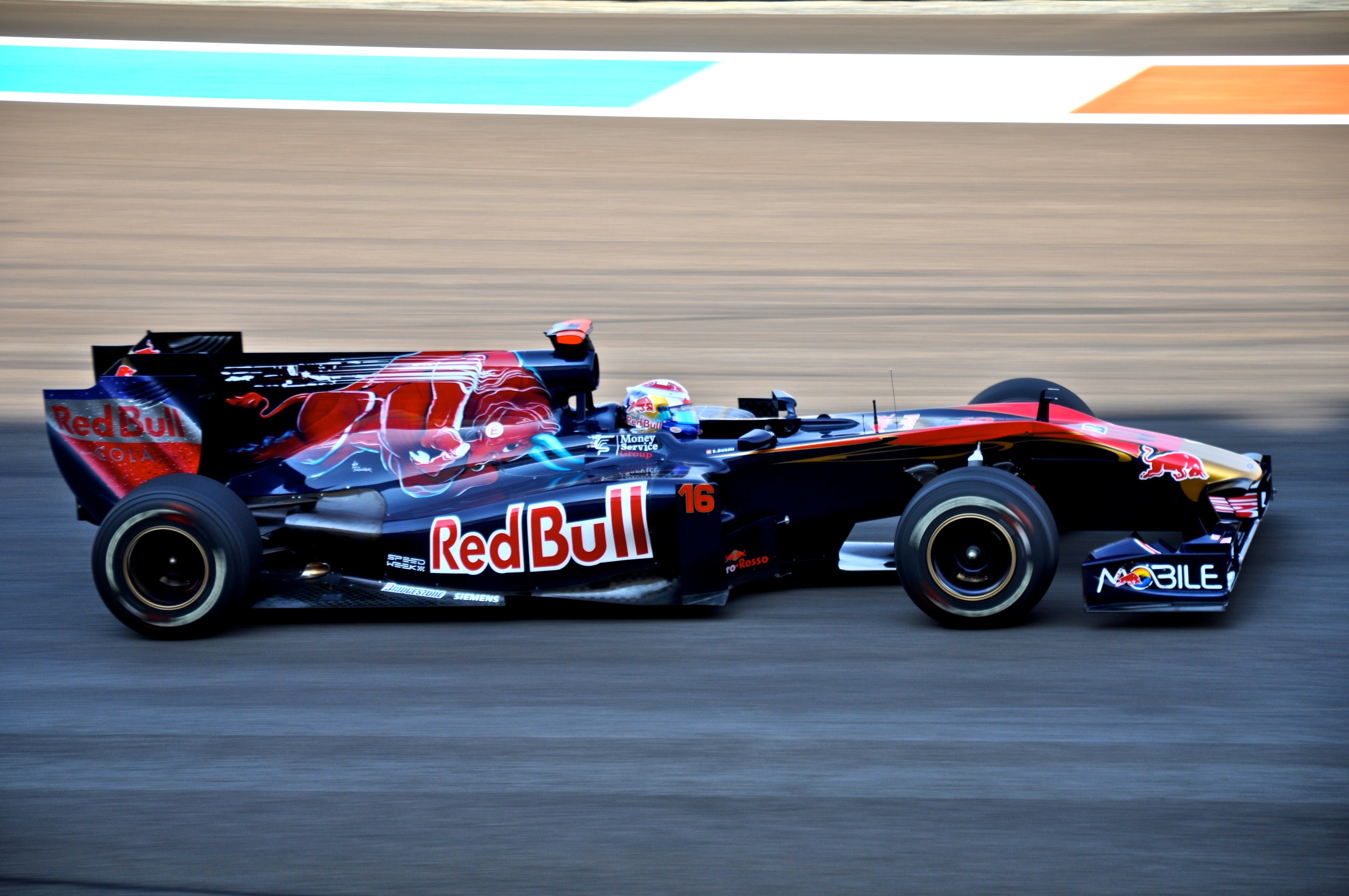
Buemi's STR5 as shown during the 2010 finale, the Abu Dhabi Grand Prix.

At the Spanish Grand Prix onwards, the Liechtenstein-based finance company Money Service Group logo could be seen on the cockpit sides of the cars.

== Complete Formula One results ==
(key) (results in bold indicate pole position; results in italics indicate fastest lap)

| Year | Entrant | Engine | Tyres | Drivers | 1 | 2 | 3 | 4 | 5 | 6 | 7 | 8 | 9 | 10 | 11 | 12 | 13 | 14 | 15 | 16 | 17 | 18 | 19 | Points | WCC |
|---|---|---|---|---|---|---|---|---|---|---|---|---|---|---|---|---|---|---|---|---|---|---|---|---|---|
| 2010 | Scuderia Toro Rosso | Ferrari 056 V8 | **B** | | BHR | AUS | MAL | CHN | ESP | MON | TUR | CAN | EUR | GBR | GER | HUN | BEL | ITA | SIN | JPN | KOR | BRA | ABU | 13 | 9th |
| 2010 | Scuderia Toro Rosso | Ferrari 056 V8 | **B** | (Switzerland) Sébastien Buemi | 16^{†} | Ret | 11 | Ret | Ret | 10 | 16 | 8 | 9 | 12 | Ret | 12 | 12 | 11 | 14 | 10 | Ret | 13 | 15 | 13 | 9th |
| 2010 | Scuderia Toro Rosso | Ferrari 056 V8 | **B** | (Spain) Jaime Alguersuari | 13 | 11 | 9 | 13 | 10 | 11 | 12 | 12 | 13 | Ret | 15 | Ret | 13 | 15 | 12 | 11 | 11 | 11 | 9 | 13 | 9th |

^{†} The driver did not finish the Grand Prix, but was classified as he completed over 90% of the race distance.
