= Toro Rosso STR7 =

2012 Formula One racing car

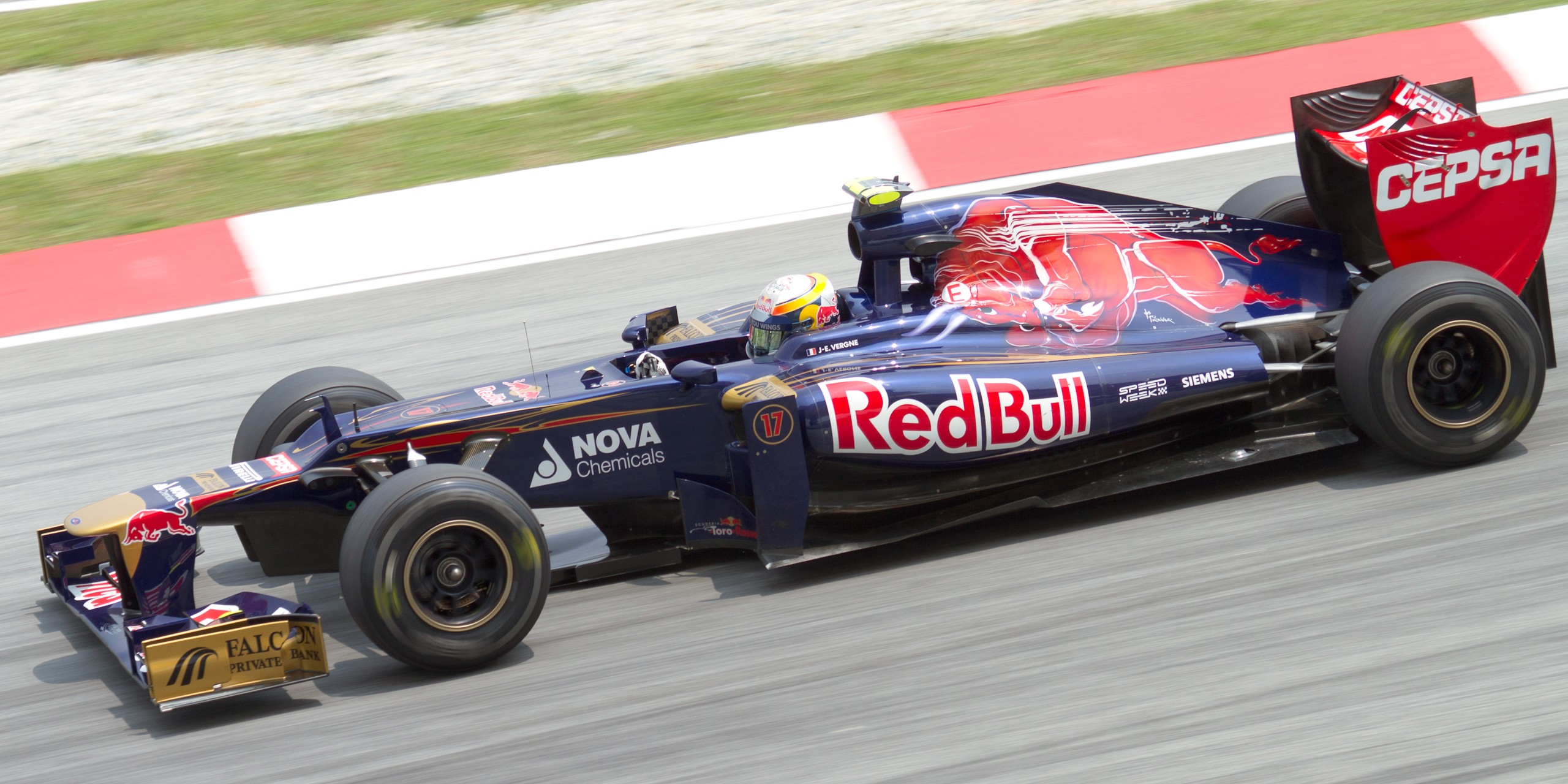
- Jean-Éric Vergne in his STR7 during the Malaysian Grand Prix
- Category: Formula One
- Constructor: Toro Rosso
- Designers: Giorgio Ascanelli (Technical Director); Ben Butler (Chief Designer); Paolo Marabini (Chief Engineer, R&D and Structures); Matteo Piraccini (Chief Engineer, Systems); Nicolò Petrucci (Head of Aerodynamics)
- Predecessor: Toro Rosso STR6
- Successor: Toro Rosso STR8

Technical specifications
- Engine: Ferrari Type 056 (2011-spec) 2,398 cc (146 cu in) 90° V8, limited to 18,000 RPM with KERS naturally aspirated mid-mounted
- Weight: 640 kg (1,411 lb) (including driver)
- Fuel: Shell V-Power (Note: Despite CEPSA is an oil and gas company as a major sponsor of Scuderia Toro Rosso since mid-2011 season, the CEPSA branding appears on the STR7, but the car uses Shell V-Power fuels and Shell Helix lubricants.)
- Lubricants: Shell Helix
- Tyres: Pirelli P Zero (dry), Cinturato (wet); Advanti Wheels (front and rear): 13"

Competition history
- Notable entrants: Scuderia Toro Rosso
- Notable drivers: 16. (Australia) Daniel Ricciardo; 17. (France) Jean-Éric Vergne
- Debut: 2012 Australian Grand Prix
- Last event: 2012 Brazilian Grand Prix
Races	Wins	Podiums	Poles	F/Laps
20	0	0	0	0

The Toro Rosso STR7 (initially referred to as the Toro Rosso TR7) is a Formula One racing car designed by Scuderia Toro Rosso for use in the 2012 FIA Formula One World Championship. It was the seventh car run by the team, and the third car that they had developed since the introduction of rules in 2010 prohibiting teams from using a "customer chassis", or a design that had previously been used by another team. The car was driven by Daniel Ricciardo and Jean-Éric Vergne, after the team elected not to renew the contracts of former drivers Sébastien Buemi and Jaime Alguersuari, and was launched on 7 February 2012 at the first winter test of the season at Jerez de la Frontera.

== Season review ==
Ricciardo took ninth during the Korean Grand Prix

The car proved promising in the first 2 races as Ricciardo and Vergne scored points each in those races. However, afterward, the car struggled for competitiveness as both drivers finished outside the points-scoring positions. Upgrades were fitted onto their cars when they headed for the Belgian GP. Since then, both drivers consistently scored points and the car showed improvements. They eventually finished the season in 9th place with 26 points with the best result of 8th place on 4 occasions where Vergne achieved all the points he had managed to get while finishing in that position.

== Livery ==
The livery remained unchanged apart from the distinctive charging bull; furthermore, the team gained new sponsors for the season including Nova Chemicals and Cepsa.

== Complete Formula One results ==
(key) (results in bold indicate pole position; results in italics indicate fastest lap)

Year	Entrant	Engine	Tyres	Drivers	1	2	3	4	5	6	7	8	9	10	11	12	13	14	15	16	17	18	19	20	Points	WCC
2012	Scuderia Toro Rosso	Ferrari Type 056	**P**		AUS	MAL	CHN	BHR	ESP	MON	CAN	EUR	GBR	GER	HUN	BEL	ITA	SIN	JPN	KOR	IND	ABU	USA	BRA	26	9th
2012	Scuderia Toro Rosso	Ferrari Type 056	**P**	(Australia) Daniel Ricciardo	9	12	17	15	13	Ret	14	11	13	13	15	9	12	9	10	9	13	10	12	13	26	9th
2012	Scuderia Toro Rosso	Ferrari Type 056	**P**	(France) Jean-Éric Vergne	11	8	16	14	12	12	15	Ret	14	14	16	8	Ret	Ret	13	8	15	12	Ret	8	26	9th
