= Toro Rosso STR6 =

2011 Formula One racing car

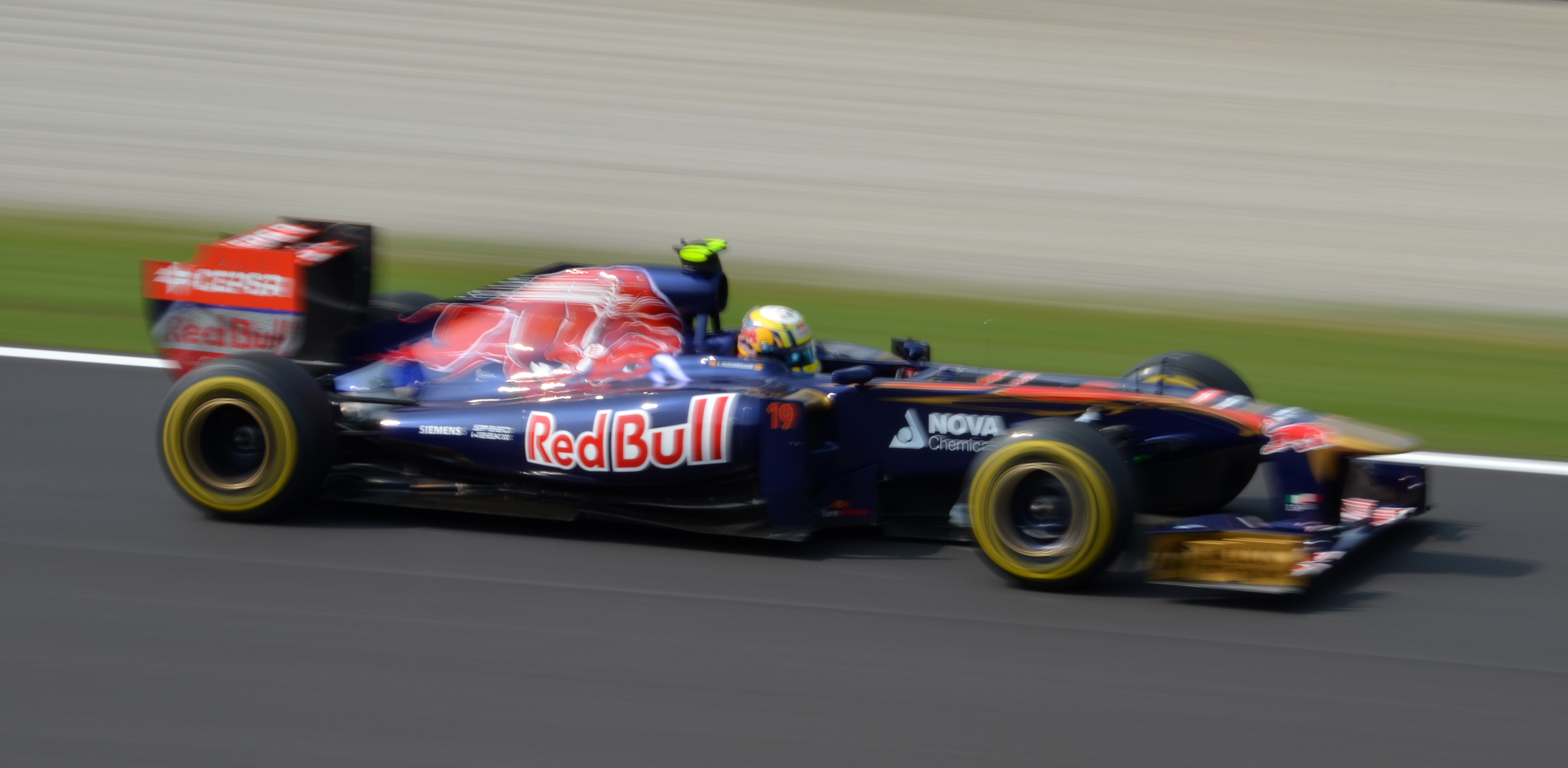
- Jaime Alguersuari driving the STR6 during the second free practice session of the Italian Grand Prix
- Category: Formula One
- Constructor: Toro Rosso
- Designers: Giorgio Ascanelli (Technical Director); Ben Butler (Chief Designer); Paolo Marabini (Chief Engineer, R&D and Structures); Matteo Piraccini (Chief Engineer, Systems); Nicolò Petrucci (Head of Aerodynamics)
- Predecessor: Toro Rosso STR5
- Successor: Toro Rosso STR7

Technical specifications
- Chassis: carbon-fibre and honeycomb composite monocoque
- Suspension (front): Upper and lower carbon wishbones, torsion bar springs and anti-roll bars, Sachs dampers
- Suspension (rear): as front
- Engine: Ferrari Type 056 (2010-spec) 2,400 cc (146.5 cu in) 90° V8, limited to 18,000 RPM with KERS naturally aspirated mid-mounted
- Transmission: Seven-speed semi-automatic gearbox with reverse gear
- Weight: 640 kg (1,411 lb) (including driver)
- Fuel: Shell V-Power
- Lubricants: Shell Helix
- Tyres: Pirelli P Zero; Advanti Wheels (front and rear): 13"

Competition history
- Notable entrants: Scuderia Toro Rosso
- Notable drivers: 18. (Switzerland) Sébastien Buemi; 19. (Spain) Jaime Alguersuari
- Debut: 2011 Australian Grand Prix
- Last event: 2011 Brazilian Grand Prix
| Races | Wins | Podiums | Poles | F/Laps |
|---|---|---|---|---|
| 19 | 0 | 0 | 0 | 0 |

The Toro Rosso STR6 is a Formula One racing car developed by Scuderia Toro Rosso for the 2011 Formula One season. It is the second car that the team has built entirely on their own following the introduction of regulations that banned the use of "customer chassis", a chassis developed by one team and purchased by another (prior to 2010 Toro Rosso used a customer chassis from its "big brother" Red Bull Racing).

This was also the first Faenza-based Formula One car to use Pirelli tyres since the Minardi M190 in 1990.

== Season summary ==
In 2011, the car was driven by Sébastien Buemi and Jaime Alguersuari, with test driver Daniel Ricciardo being guaranteed the opportunity to drive the car in the first practice session of a race weekend at all twenty races in the season (Ricciardo was signed by Hispania Racing as a replacement for Narain Karthikeyan from Round 9 of the championship in Great Britain). The car was unveiled on 1 February at the Circuit Ricardo Tormo in Valencia, Spain.

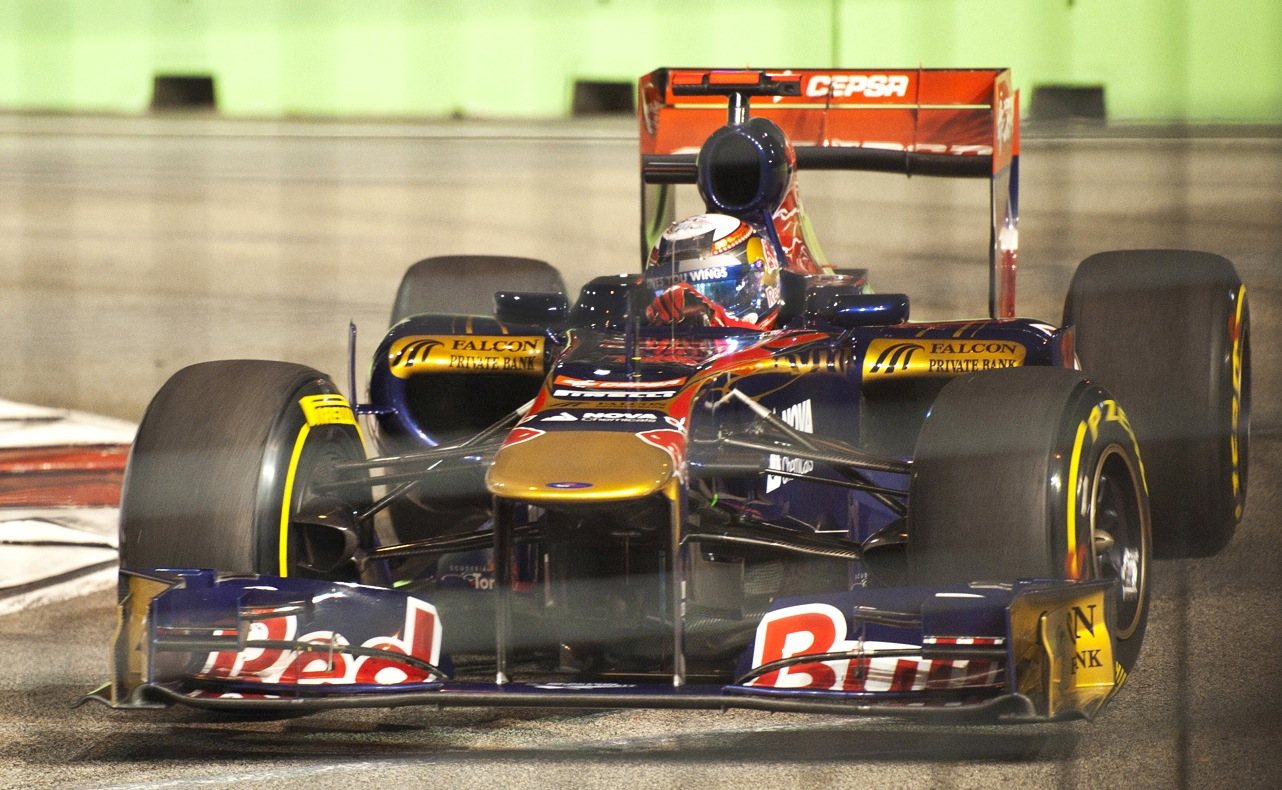
Buemi during the Singapore Grand Prix

The Toro Rosso STR6 was powered by the Type 056 engine from Ferrari, the same engine that powered the works Ferraris but Toro Rosso STR6 was opted 2010-spec Ferrari 056 engine due to cheap price reasons. Alguersuari recorded the cars highest qualifying position with 6th at the Belgian Grand Prix and he also recorded the cars best finish with a pair of 7th places at the Italian and Korean Grands Prix. Buemi and Alguersuari combined to score 41 points in 2011 giving the team 8th in the Constructors Championship. Buemi scored 15 of the points to finish the Drivers' Championship in 15th place while Alguersuari scored 26 to finish 14th.

The drivers proved well-matched, with Buemi having a slight edge over Alguersuari. However, the Swiss left the team and championship at the end of the year to join newly-reformed Toyota Racing for newly-reformed World Endurance Championship from 2012 onwards.

The team eventually finished seventh in the Constructors' Championship, with 11 points.

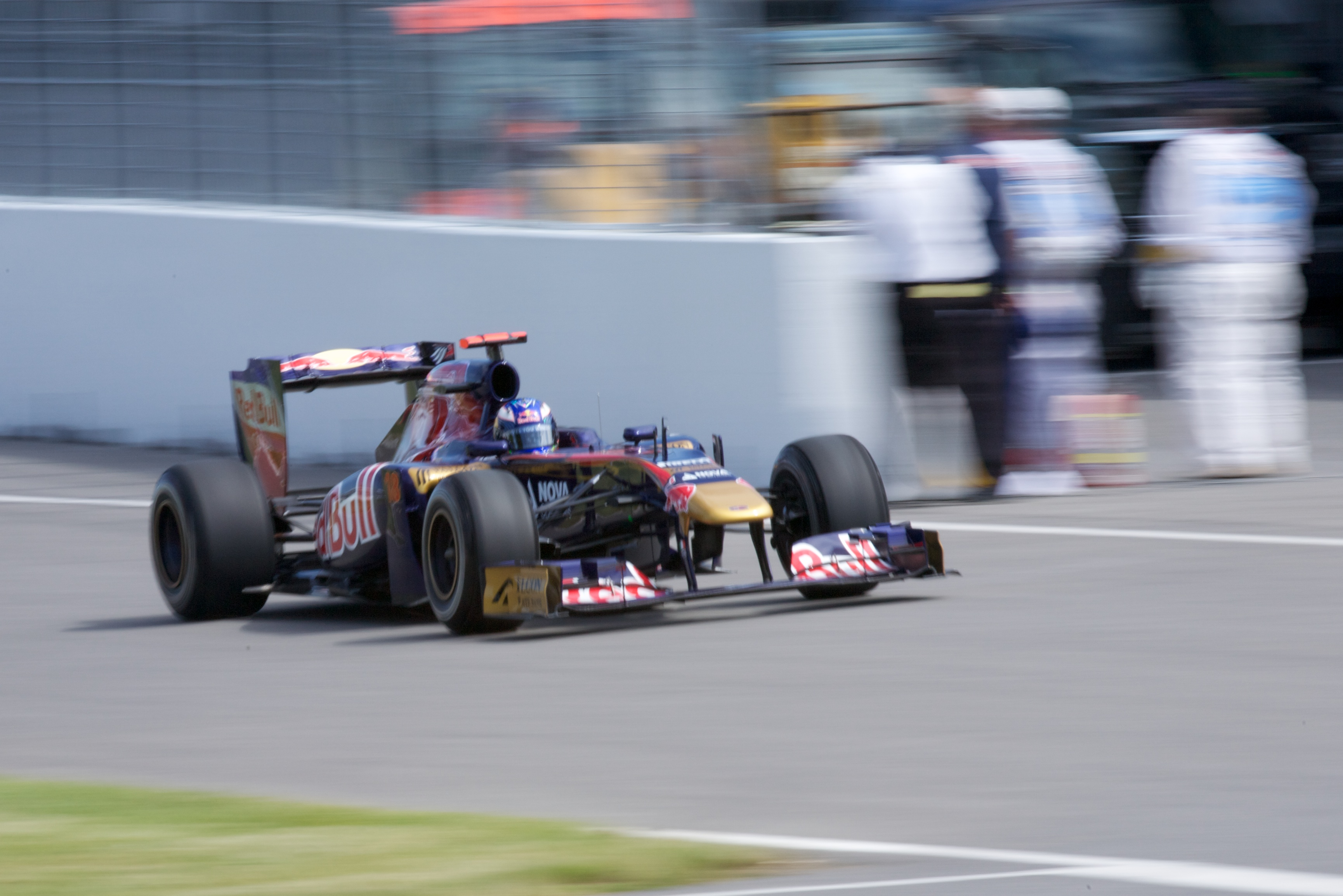
Ricciardo during his FP1 appearance at the Canadian Grand Prix

== Sponsorship and livery ==
The Toro Rosso STR6 is painted in a dark blue base colour. Due to the Red Bull logo, the STR6 features red colour accents. Other sponsors on the vehicle include Speedweek, The Red Bulletin, Red Bull Cola, Siemens, Nova Chemicals and Pirelli.

At the Malaysian Grand Prix, the Giant logo is visible on the nose of the car, and the Cold Storage logo bargeboards. Starting from the Spanish Grand Prix, Falcon Private Bank will be a sponsor, with branding on the nose of the car and on the endplates of the front wing.

At the Italian Grand Prix, the team secured a new sponsor, Cepsa, with their logos placed on the car's rear wing, endplates, and nose.

== Complete Formula One results ==
(key) (results in bold indicate pole position; results in italics indicate fastest lap)

| Year | Entrant | Engine | Tyres | Drivers | 1 | 2 | 3 | 4 | 5 | 6 | 7 | 8 | 9 | 10 | 11 | 12 | 13 | 14 | 15 | 16 | 17 | 18 | 19 | Points | WCC |
|---|---|---|---|---|---|---|---|---|---|---|---|---|---|---|---|---|---|---|---|---|---|---|---|---|---|
| 2011 | Scuderia Toro Rosso | Ferrari 056 V8 | **P** | | AUS | MAL | CHN | TUR | ESP | MON | CAN | EUR | GBR | GER | HUN | BEL | ITA | SIN | JPN | KOR | IND | ABU | BRA | 41 | 8th |
| 2011 | Scuderia Toro Rosso | Ferrari 056 V8 | **P** | (Switzerland) Sébastien Buemi | 8 | 13 | 14 | 9 | 14 | 10 | 10 | 13 | Ret | 15 | 8 | Ret | 10 | 12 | Ret | 9 | Ret | Ret | 12 | 41 | 8th |
| 2011 | Scuderia Toro Rosso | Ferrari 056 V8 | **P** | (Spain) Jaime Alguersuari | 11 | 14 | Ret | 16 | 16 | Ret | 8 | 8 | 10 | 12 | 10 | Ret | 7 | 21^{†} | 15 | 7 | 8 | 15 | 11 | 41 | 8th |
