= Toro Rosso STR4 =

2009 Formula One racing car

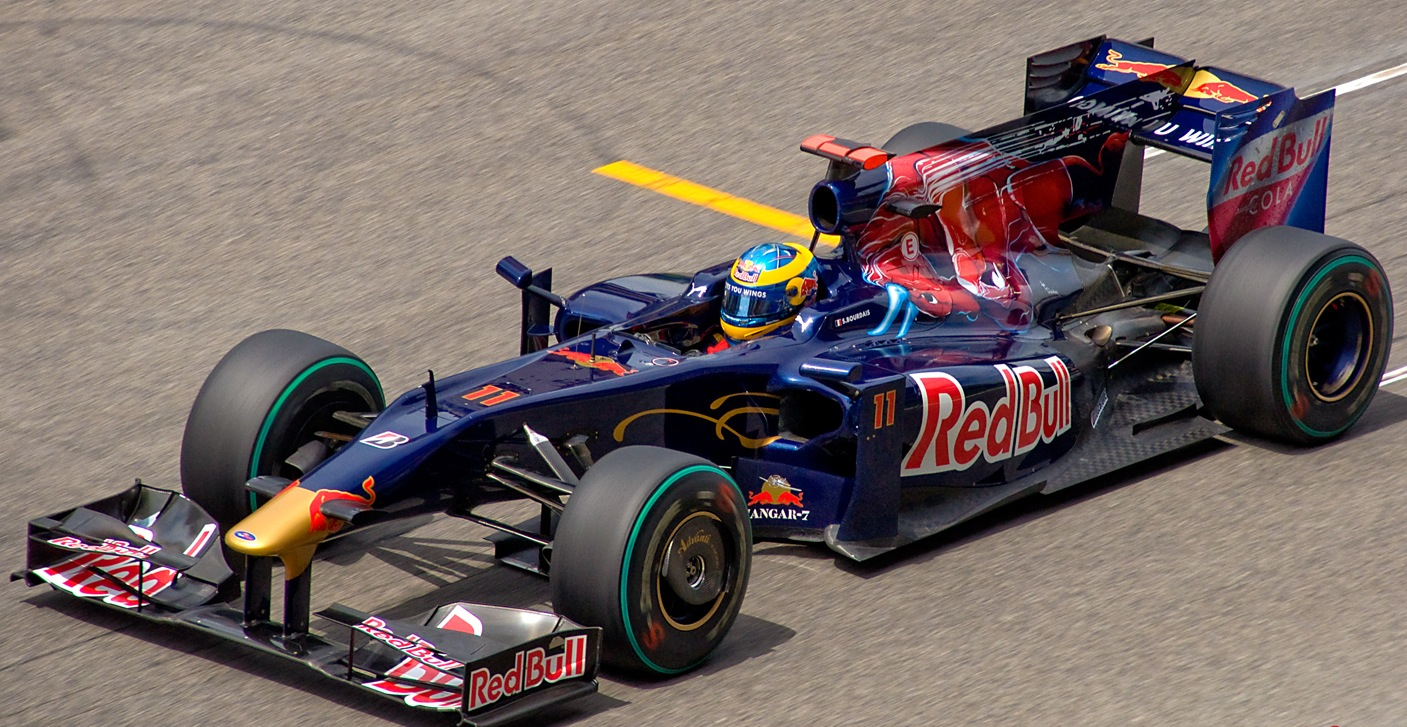
- Sébastien Bourdais driving the STR4 at the Spanish Grand Prix
- Category: Formula One
- Constructor: Toro Rosso
- Designers: Giorgio Ascanelli (Technical Director); Adrian Newey (Chief Technical Officer - Red Bull); Geoff Willis (Technical Director - Red Bull); Rob Marshall (Chief Designer - Red Bull); Peter Prodromou (Head of Aerodynamics - Red Bull)
- Predecessor: Toro Rosso STR3
- Successor: Toro Rosso STR5

Technical specifications
- Chassis: carbon-fibre and honeycomb composite structure
- Suspension (front): cast titanium uprights, pushrods, carbon-fibre upper and lower wishbones
- Suspension (rear): cast titanium uprights, pullrods, carbon-fibre upper and lower wishbones
- Engine: Ferrari 056 (2008-spec) 2398cc V8 18,000 RPM Limited
- Transmission: 7-speed sequential
- Fuel: Shell
- Tyres: Bridgestone

Competition history
- Notable entrants: Scuderia Toro Rosso
- Notable drivers: 11. (France) Sébastien Bourdais; 11. (Spain) Jaime Alguersuari; 12. (Switzerland) Sébastien Buemi
- Debut: 2009 Australian Grand Prix
- Last event: 2009 Abu Dhabi Grand Prix
Races	Wins	Podiums	Poles	F/Laps
17	0	0	0	0

The Toro Rosso STR4 was a Formula One car which Scuderia Toro Rosso used in the 2009 Formula One season. The car was revealed to be a Red Bull RB5 with a 2008-spec Ferrari 056 engine in Barcelona on March 9, 2009. It was revealed before the testing session.

The Toro Rosso STR4 was the last-ever Toro Rosso car to be built by its senior sister team Red Bull Racing, as from the 2010 season onwards Toro Rosso switched to in-house designed cars.

== Competition history ==
The STR4 was driven by Sébastien Bourdais and Sébastien Buemi for the first half of the season. Jaime Alguersuari replaced Bourdais from the Hungarian Grand Prix onwards.

=== Sébastien Buemi ===
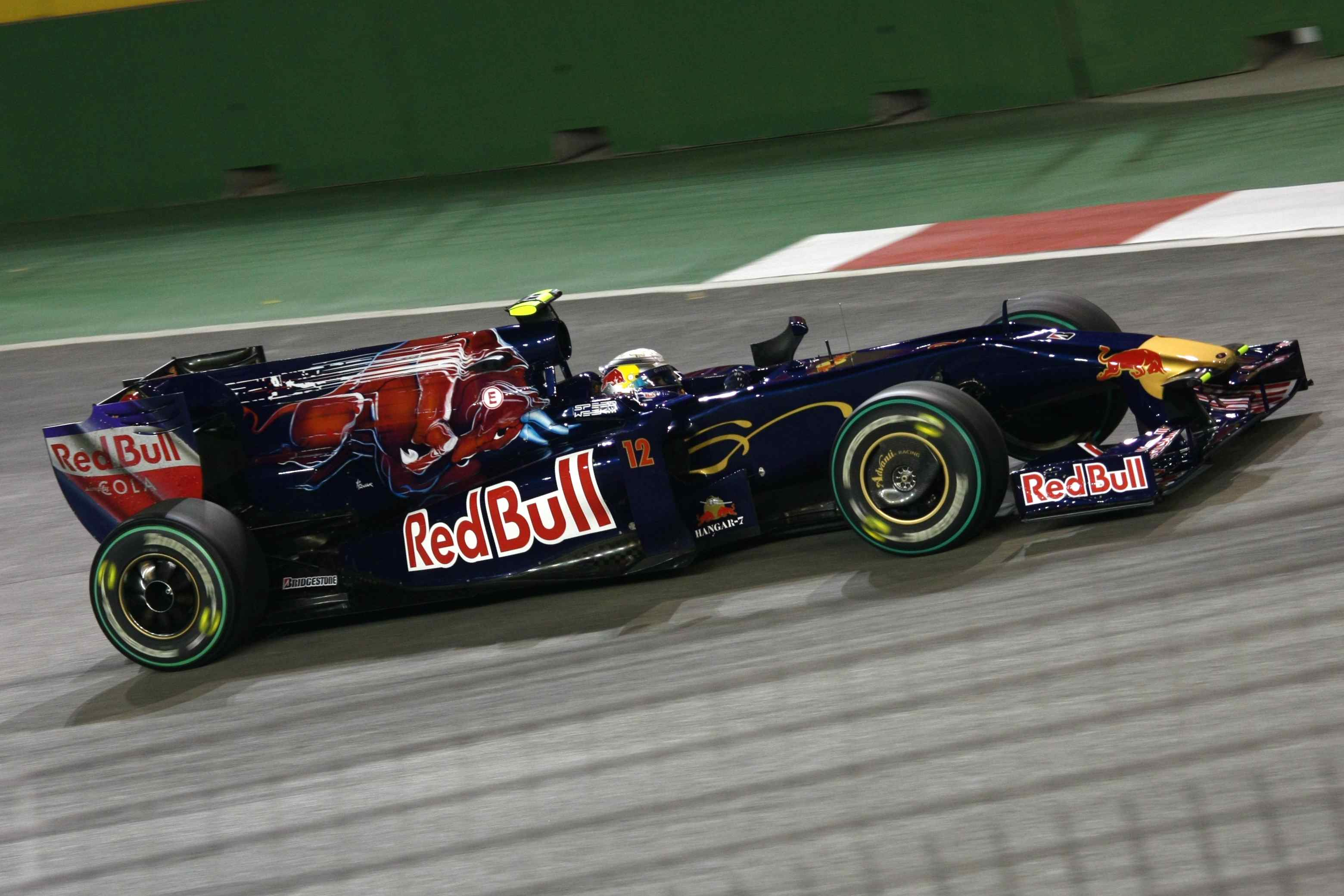
Buemi during the Singapore Grand Prix

Buemi scored 7th place on his debut race at the 2009 Australian Grand Prix. His teammate Sebastian Bourdais also scored points that race. He went on to finish 8th in China, before finishing 7th and 8th in the final two races in Brazil and Abu Dhabi.

=== Sébastien Bourdais ===
Bourdais scored an 8th place at the 2009 Australian Grand Prix. His teammate Sébastien Buemi also scored points that race. However Bourdais had poor results during the 2008 season, scoring only 4 points unlike his 2008 teammate Sebastian Vettel who scored 35 and a race win in Monza. At the 2009 Hungarian Grand Prix, he was replaced by Jaime Alguersuari following a similar season of poor results, having scored only 2 points after the German Grand Prix before he was fired.

=== Jaime Alguersuari ===
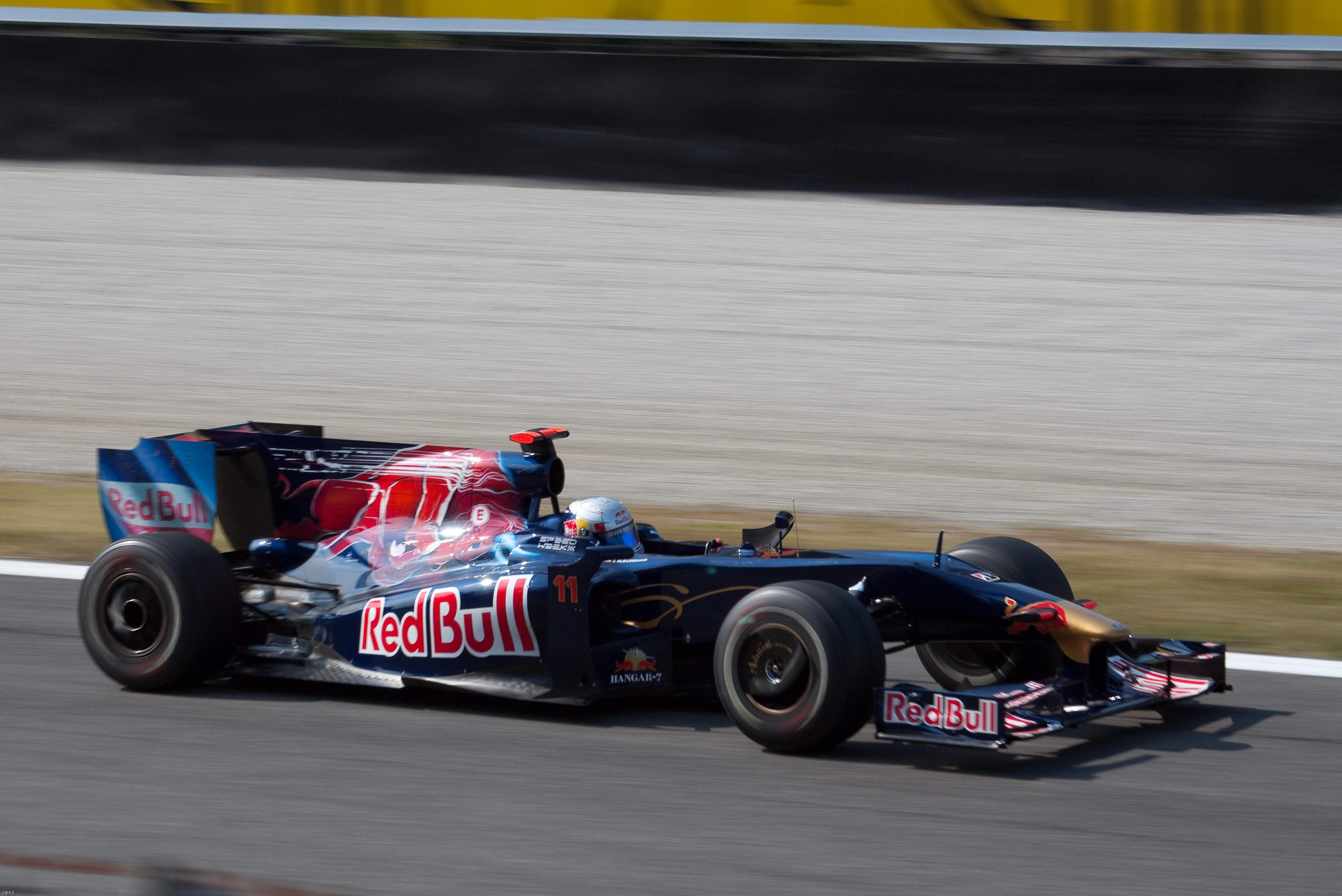
Alguersuari at the Italian Grand Prix

Alguersuari made his debut at the Hungarian Grand Prix as his predecessor Sébastien Bourdais was replaced following a string of poor results. However he only managed to finish 3 races out of the 8 he raced in, with a best result of 14th in the Brazilian Grand Prix.

== Sponsorship and livery ==
The STR4's base colour was dark blue, thanks to its main sponsor, Red Bull. The energy drink manufacturer's logo and lettering added red accents to the car.

At the Chinese Grand Prix, as a tribute to the victims of the 2009 L'Aquila earthquake collapse, Toro Rosso included a decal with the words "Vicini All'Abruzzo." for the race weekend on their cars.

== Complete Formula One results ==
(key) (results in bold indicate pole position; results in italics indicate fastest lap)

Year	Entrant	Engine	Tyres	Drivers	1	2	3	4	5	6	7	8	9	10	11	12	13	14	15	16	17	Points	WCC
2009	Scuderia Toro Rosso	Ferrari 056 V8	**B**		AUS	MAL	CHN	BHR	ESP	MON	TUR	GBR	GER	HUN	EUR	BEL	ITA	SIN	JPN	BRA	ABU	8	10th
2009	Scuderia Toro Rosso	Ferrari 056 V8	**B**	(France) Sébastien Bourdais	8	10	11	13	Ret	8	18	Ret	Ret									8	10th
2009	Scuderia Toro Rosso	Ferrari 056 V8	**B**	(Spain) Jaime Alguersuari										15	16	Ret	Ret	Ret	Ret	14	Ret	8	10th
2009	Scuderia Toro Rosso	Ferrari 056 V8	**B**	(Switzerland) Sébastien Buemi	7	16^{†}	8	17	Ret	Ret	15	18	16	16	Ret	12	13^{1}	Ret	Ret	7	8	8	10th

^{†} Driver failed to finish, but was classified as they had completed >90% of the race distance.

- **^1** – Sébastien Buemi followed the safety car to the pit lane on the final lap of the Italian Grand Prix, therefore he was not considered to have finished the race. He was classified as he had driven 90% of the winner's race distance.
