= Toro Rosso STR8 =

Formula One racing car

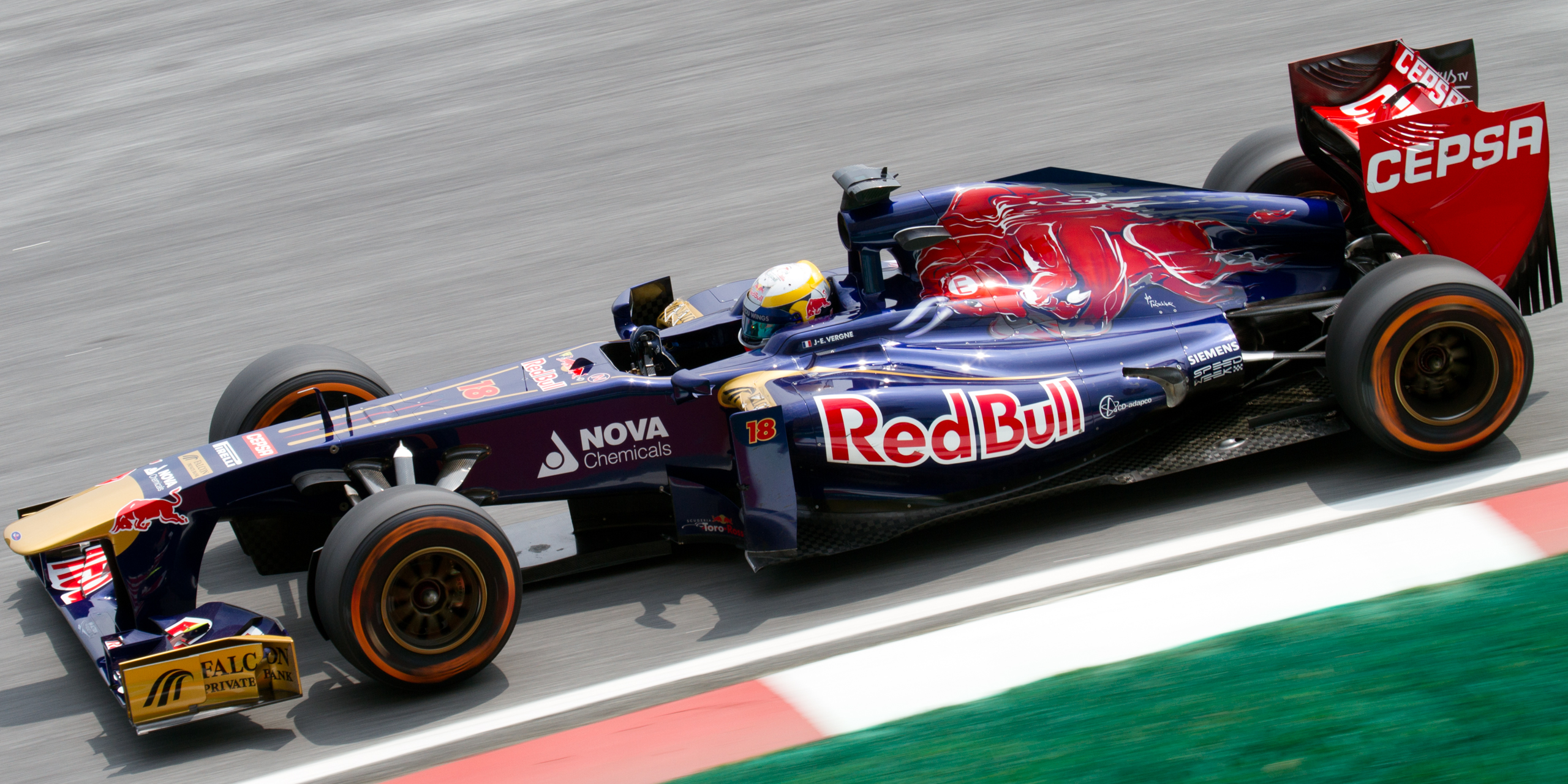
- Jean-Éric Vergne in his STR8 during the Malaysian Grand Prix
- Category: Formula One
- Constructor: Toro Rosso
- Designers: James Key (Technical Director); Luca Furbatto (Chief Designer); Paolo Marabini (Chief Engineer, R&D and Structures); Matteo Piraccini (Chief Engineer, Systems); Laurent Mekies (Head of Vehicle Performance); Nicolò Petrucci (Head of Aerodynamics)
- Predecessor: Toro Rosso STR7
- Successor: Toro Rosso STR9

Technical specifications
- Chassis: Moulded carbon fibre composite monocoque incorporating front and side impact structures
- Suspension (front): Upper and lower carbon wishbones, torsion bar Sachs springs and anti roll bars, pushrod suspension
- Suspension (rear): As front but pullrod
- Length: 5,100 mm (201 in; 17 ft)
- Width: 1,800 mm (71 in; 6 ft)
- Height: 950 mm (37 in; 3 ft)
- Wheelbase: Over 3,100 mm (122 in; 10 ft)
- Engine: Ferrari Tipo 056 (2012-spec) 2,398 cc (146 cu in) V8 (90°) naturally-aspirated, 18,000 RPM limited with KERS, mid-mounted
- Transmission: Red Bull Technology 7-speed hydraulic actuated sequential paddle shift
- Power: 750 + 80 hp (559 + 60 kW) with KERS
- Weight: 642 kg (including driver and camera)
- Fuel: Shell V-Power (Note: Despite CEPSA is an oil and gas company as a major sponsor of Scuderia Toro Rosso since mid-2011 season, the CEPSA branding appears on the STR8, but the car uses Shell V-Power fuels and Shell Helix lubricants.)
- Lubricants: Shell Helix
- Tyres: Pirelli P Zero (dry), Cinturato (wet)

Competition history
- Notable entrants: Scuderia Toro Rosso
- Notable drivers: 18. (France) Jean-Éric Vergne; 19. (Australia) Daniel Ricciardo
- Debut: 2013 Australian Grand Prix
- Last event: 2013 Brazilian Grand Prix
Races	Wins	Podiums	Poles	F/Laps
19	0	0	0	0

The Toro Rosso STR8 (initially referred to as the Toro Rosso STR08) is a Formula One racing car designed and built by Scuderia Toro Rosso for use in the 2013 Formula One season. It was driven by Daniel Ricciardo and Jean-Éric Vergne, both of whom drove for the team in 2012.

This was the last Toro Rosso car to use a Ferrari engine since 2007 before switching to Renault for 2014 Formula One season and the last Toro Rosso car to use a V8 engine.

== Season summary ==
The start of the season did not bring much success for the Faenza-based team, as only Vergne managed to finish in the points doing so in Malaysia. The first signs of progress appeared at the Chinese Grand Prix, which saw the debut of a new suspension system; Ricciardo reached Q3 and secured seventh place. In the same race, Vergne could also have achieved a points scoring finish, but his race was compromised by a collision with Mark Webber.

The team’s good run continued with a tenth-place finish for Ricciardo in Spain, followed by an eighth-place for Vergne in Monaco a result aided by a collision between Sergio Perez and Kimi Räikkönen, who had been running ahead of him. The French driver then delivered the team’s best result of the season in Canada, qualifying for Q3 and finishing the race in sixth place. At the following race at British, it was Ricciardo who scored points; he had started from fifth and even battled for a podium position for several laps. In that same event, Vergne’s race was ruined when his rear tire exploded while he was running in third place.

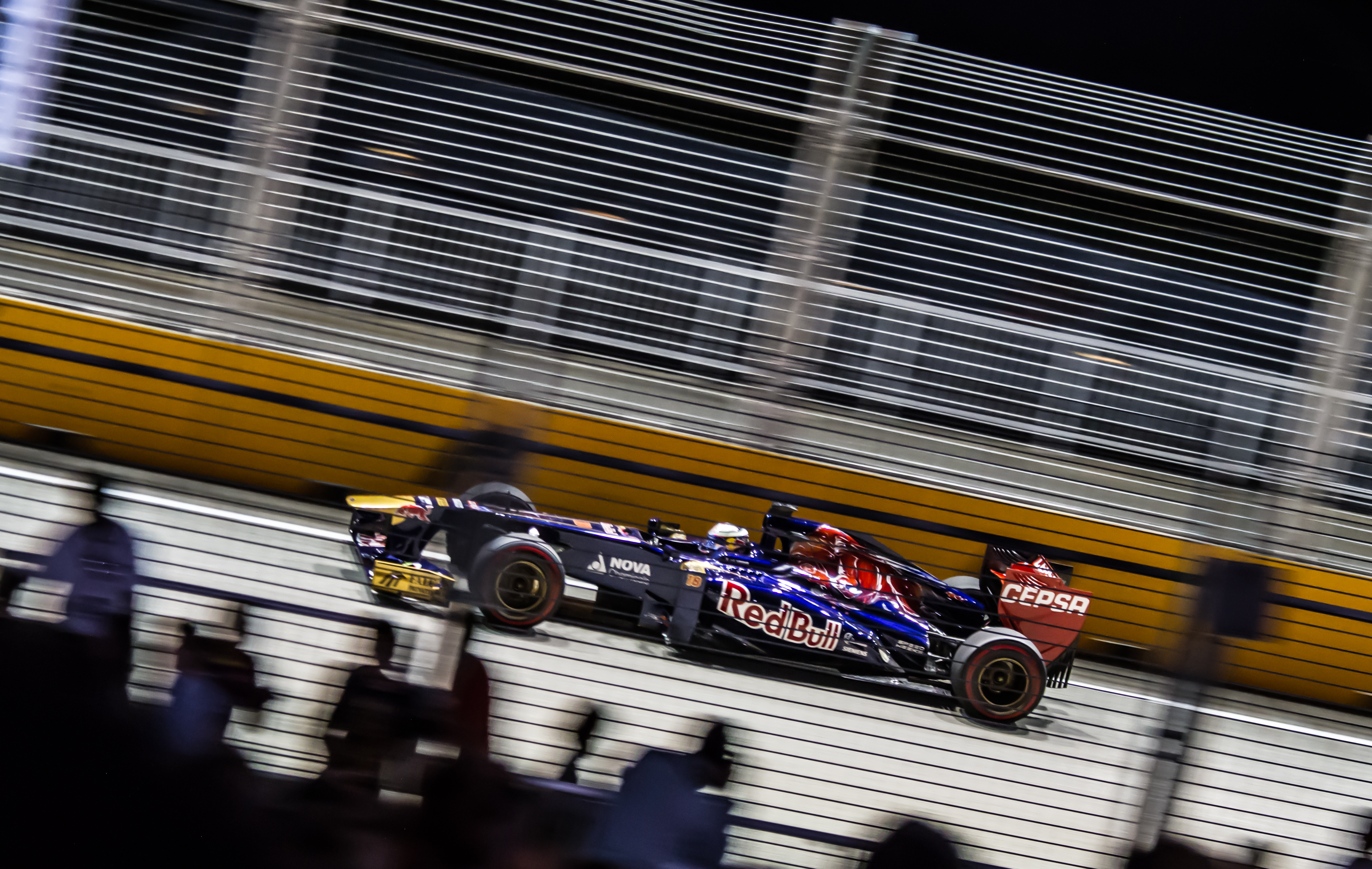
Daniel Ricciardo during qualifying in the Singapore Grand Prix

The poor performance of the Ferrari engine caused Franz Tost to look for an alternative. Discussions for a deal with Renault came into fruition and eventually Toro Rosso would switch their allegiance to Renault engines from 2014 season onwards.

The team eventually finished a respectable eighth in the Constructors' Championship, with 33 points.

== Sponsorship and livery ==
The STR8 features a dark blue base color. Due to the presence of sponsor logos from Cepsa and Red Bull, the car incorporates red accents. Cepsa’s branding appears on the rear wing, while Red Bull’s is displayed on the engine cover and sidepods. Other major sponsors include NOVA Chemicals and Falcon.

== Complete Formula One results ==
(key) (results in bold indicate pole position; results in italics indicate fastest lap)

Year	Entrant	Engine	Tyres	Drivers	Grands Prix																			Points	WCC
Year	Entrant	Engine	Tyres	Drivers	AUS	MAL	CHN	BHR	ESP	MON	CAN	GBR	GER	HUN	BEL	ITA	SIN	KOR	JPN	IND	ABU	USA	BRA	Points	WCC
2013	Scuderia Toro Rosso	Ferrari Type 056	**P**	(France) Jean-Éric Vergne	12	10	12	Ret	Ret	8	6	Ret	Ret	12	12	Ret	14	18^{†}	12	13	17	16	15	33	8th
2013	Scuderia Toro Rosso	Ferrari Type 056	**P**	(Australia) Daniel Ricciardo	Ret	18^{†}	7	16	10	Ret	15	8	12	13	10	7	Ret	19^{†}	13	10	16	11	10	33	8th

^{†} Driver failed to finish the race, but was classified as they had completed greater than 90% of the race distance.
