= Giorgio Ascanelli =

Italian automotive engineer (born 1959)

- Born: 23 February 1959 (age 67); Ferrara, Emilia-Romagna, Italy

Giorgio Ascanelli (born 23 February 1959) is an Italian automotive engineer who has worked for several years in Formula 1. He is currently the technical head of Brembo, a supplier of Formula 1 brakes.

== Career ==
Ascanelli began his sporting career in 1985, as a calculation technician at Ferrari. In 1987, after two years of processing numerical data, he moved to Abarth, through the Fiat meeting program, working as an engineer, but at the end of the year he returned to Ferrari and started working as a track engineer for Gerhard Berger. This relationship lasted three seasons, when Berger left Ferrari to race with McLaren.

Ascanelli joined Benetton in 1990, under the orders of his former Ferrari superior, John Barnard. Ascanelli was Nelson Piquet's track engineer for two seasons, but after Barnard's departure, followed by Piquet's decision to retire from Formula 1, Ascanelli signed to McLaren for the 1992 season as Gerhard Berger's track engineer. After Berger, he became Ayrton Senna's track engineer in the 1993 season, during which the partnership resulted in some of the three-time Brazilian champion's most famous victories.

When Senna was hired by Williams in 1994, Ascanelli left McLaren and returned to Italy in 1995 to work again with Berger and Barnard at Ferrari. Specifically, Ascanelli became director of engineers, overseeing both Berger and the other driver, Jean Alesi. Ascanelli remained in that position until early 1998, when it was announced that he had no plans to travel to that year's races, as his duties had been taken over by Ross Brawn. Despite this, Ascanelli remained at Ferrari dealing with research and development, also being involved in the technical connection between Ferrari and Prost Grand Prix, for the supply of the Ferrari engine. In 2002 he moved to Maserati, where he headed the technical department, until 2006, giving life to the MC12 in the GT.

In April 2007, Ascanelli returned to F1 with Scuderia Toro Rosso, where he was appointed technical director of the Faenza team. The team achieved its first victory in the 2008 Italian Grand Prix with Sebastian Vettel. In mid-2012, his absence from the Grands Prix was the subject of much speculation, until, in September 2012, Toro Rosso confirmed that Ascanelli had left the team.

In February 2013, Ascanelli joined Formula 1 brake supplier Brembo as the company's new technical chief.
