= Nicolò Petrucci =

Italian engineer

- Born: 21 June 1962 (age 63)

Nicolò Petrucci is an Italian engineer, former head of aerodynamics at Scuderia Toro Rosso, the Formula One team.

== Career ==
Nicolò Petrucci studied aeronautical engineering at the Politecnico di Milano university of technology in Milan, Italy, specializing in aerodynamics. He wrote a research paper on aero-elastic phenomena in a Formula 1 car, which was completed with the help of Harvey Postlethwaite and Giampaolo Dallara. This led to Petrucci's job in 1992 as a computational fluid dynamics engineer at Scuderia Ferrari, a Formula One team. He briefly worked at the Planair wind tunnel. In 1997 he moved to Maranello, Italy to become a senior aerodynamicist, then was promoted to project leader. In early 2001, he moved to Arrows, where he worked as head of the aerodynamics team. Petrucci's work made the car very competitive until the team ran out of funds in the summer of 2002. After that, he moved to Jordan Grand Prix, but this team also ran out of funds, Petrucci resigned. At the end of 2004 Petrucci started working for Toyota. From February 2007 to July next year, Petrucci worked at Honda as head of the aerodynamics team. From September 2008 to November 2011 he was the head of aerodynamics at Scuderia Toro Rosso.
