= Toro Rosso STR9 =

Formula One racing car

- Daniil Kvyat in his STR9 during the British Grand Prix
- Category: Formula One
- Constructor: Toro Rosso
- Designers: James Key (Technical Director); Luca Furbatto (Chief Designer); Paolo Marabini (Chief Engineer, R&D and Structures); Matteo Piraccini (Chief Engineer, Systems); Laurent Mekies (Head of Vehicle Performance); Brendan Gilhome (Head of Aerodynamics)
- Predecessor: Toro Rosso STR8
- Successor: Toro Rosso STR10

Technical specifications
- Chassis: Carbon fibre composite monocoque structure
- Suspension (front): Upper and lower carbon wishbones, pushrod, torsion bar springs, central damper and anti roll bars, Multimatic/Penske dampers
- Suspension (rear): Upper and lower carbon wishbones, pullrod, torsion bar springs, central damper and anti roll bars, Multimatic/Penske dampers
- Engine: Renault Energy F1-2014 1.6 L (98 cu in) V6, turbo
- Transmission: Red Bull Technology 8-speed sequential gearbox – hydraulically actuated
- Weight: 691 kg (1,523.4 lb)
- Fuel: Total (Note: Despite CEPSA is an oil and gas company as a major sponsor of Scuderia Toro Rosso since mid-2011 season, the CEPSA branding appears on the STR9, but the car uses Total fuel and lubricants.)
- Lubricants: Total
- Tyres: Pirelli P Zero (dry), Cinturato (wet)

Competition history
- Notable entrants: Scuderia Toro Rosso
- Notable drivers: 25. (France) Jean-Éric Vergne; 26. (Russia) Daniil Kvyat
- Debut: 2014 Australian Grand Prix
- Last event: 2014 Abu Dhabi Grand Prix
Races	Wins	Podiums	Poles	F/Laps
19	0	0	0	0

The Toro Rosso STR9 is a Formula One racing car designed by Scuderia Toro Rosso to compete in the 2014 Formula One season. It was driven by Jean-Éric Vergne and 2013 GP3 Series champion Daniil Kvyat, who replaced Daniel Ricciardo after the Australian was promoted to Red Bull Racing. The STR9 was the first Toro Rosso car to use an engine built by Renault, the Energy F1-2014.

This was the first Italian-licensed F1 car to use Renault engines since the Benetton B201 in 2001 and also the first Faenza-based Formula One car to utilize turbocharged engines since the Minardi M187 in 1987.

== Season summary ==
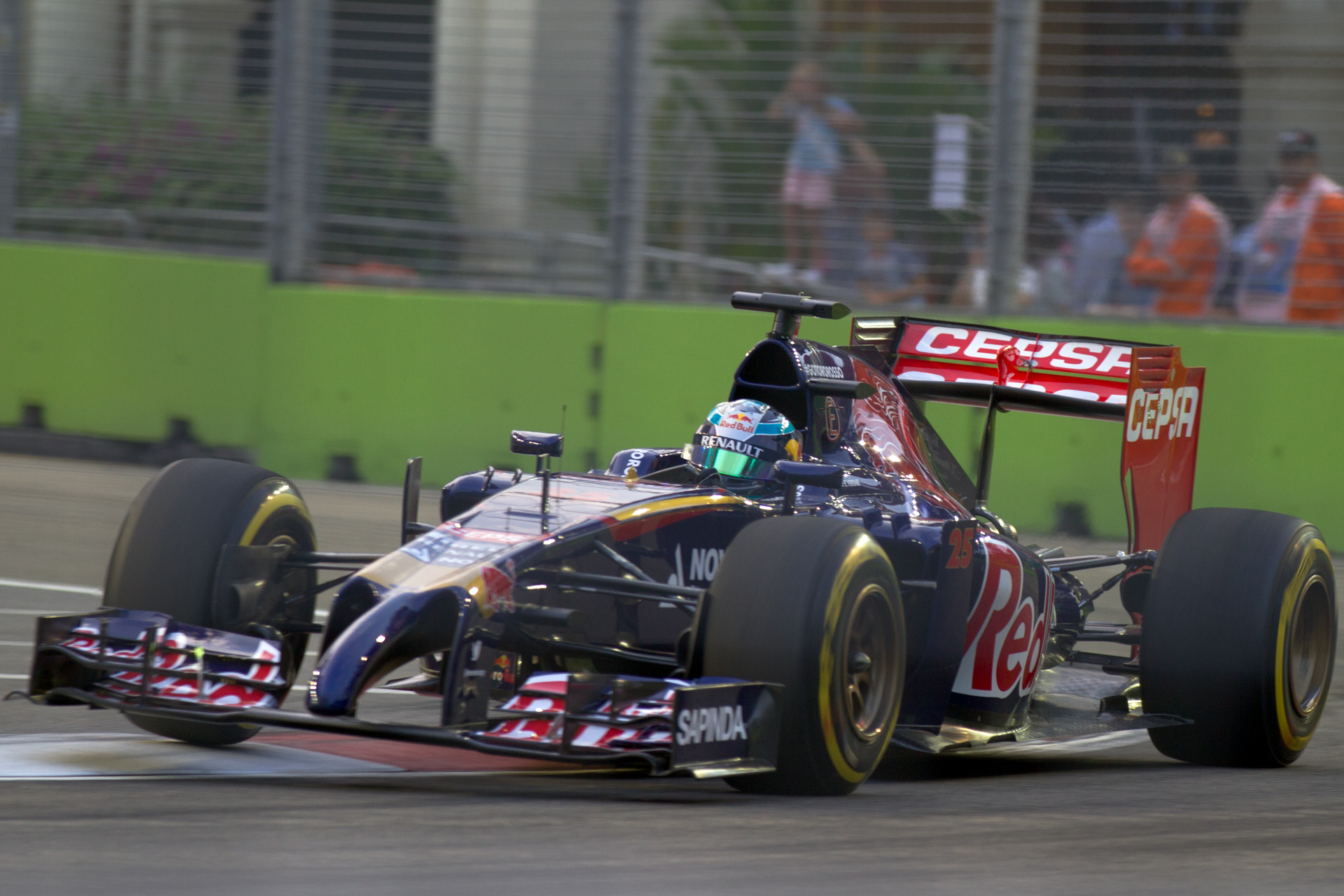
Vergne took home sixth in Singapore; the team's best result in 2014

2014 confirmed Toro Rosso's position as a midfield runner unable to make the final breakthrough needed to become a top team. The team's package was not quite enough to regularly score points. Indeed, Vergne and Kvyat finished just outside the points, no less than eight times. The highlight of the year was Vergne's run to sixth at the Singapore Grand Prix to score the team's season highest finish.

But sixth place finish at Singapore was not enough for Vergne to remain in Toro Rosso squad for 2015 season and hence he was replaced by Carlos Sainz Jr. for the following season. Kvyat, despite a points finish in the first race of the season, lost his motivation after a sequence of bad luck and narrowly missing out on further points. He decided to move to Red Bull Racing for the following season after Sebastian Vettel decided to move to Ferrari team, and would be replaced by future world champion Max Verstappen.

The team eventually finished seventh in the Constructors' Championship with 30 points. This was their second best WCC position so far, but there was still some way to go to take on the likes of Red Bull, Mercedes, Ferrari, Williams and McLaren.

== Sponsorship and livery ==
The Toro Rosso STR9 is painted in a dark blue base colour. It features red accents due to the sponsor logos of Cepsa and Red Bull; Cepsa advertises on the rear wing, while Red Bull appears on the engine cover and sidepods. Other major sponsors include NOVA Chemicals and Sapinda Holding.

At the Abu Dhabi Grand Prix, Toro Rosso featured a special "Spielberg – See You 2015" slogan on their cars to promote the return of the Austrian Grand Prix at the Red Bull Ring in Spielberg.

== Complete Formula One results ==
(key)

Year	Entrant	Engine	Tyres	Drivers	Grands Prix																			Points	WCC
Year	Entrant	Engine	Tyres	Drivers	AUS	MAL	BHR	CHN	ESP	MON	CAN	AUT	GBR	GER	HUN	BEL	ITA	SIN	JPN	RUS	USA	BRA	ABU‡	Points	WCC
2014	Scuderia Toro Rosso	Renault Energy F1-2014	P	(France) Jean-Éric Vergne	8	Ret	Ret	12	Ret	Ret	8	Ret	10	13	9	11	13	6	9	13	10	13	12	30	7th
2014	Scuderia Toro Rosso	Renault Energy F1-2014	P	(Russia) Daniil Kvyat	9	10	11	10	14	Ret	Ret	Ret	9	Ret	14	9	11	14	11	14	15	11	Ret	30	7th

‡ — Teams and drivers scored double points at the Abu Dhabi Grand Prix.
