= Toro Rosso STR11 =

Toro Rosso Formula One racing car

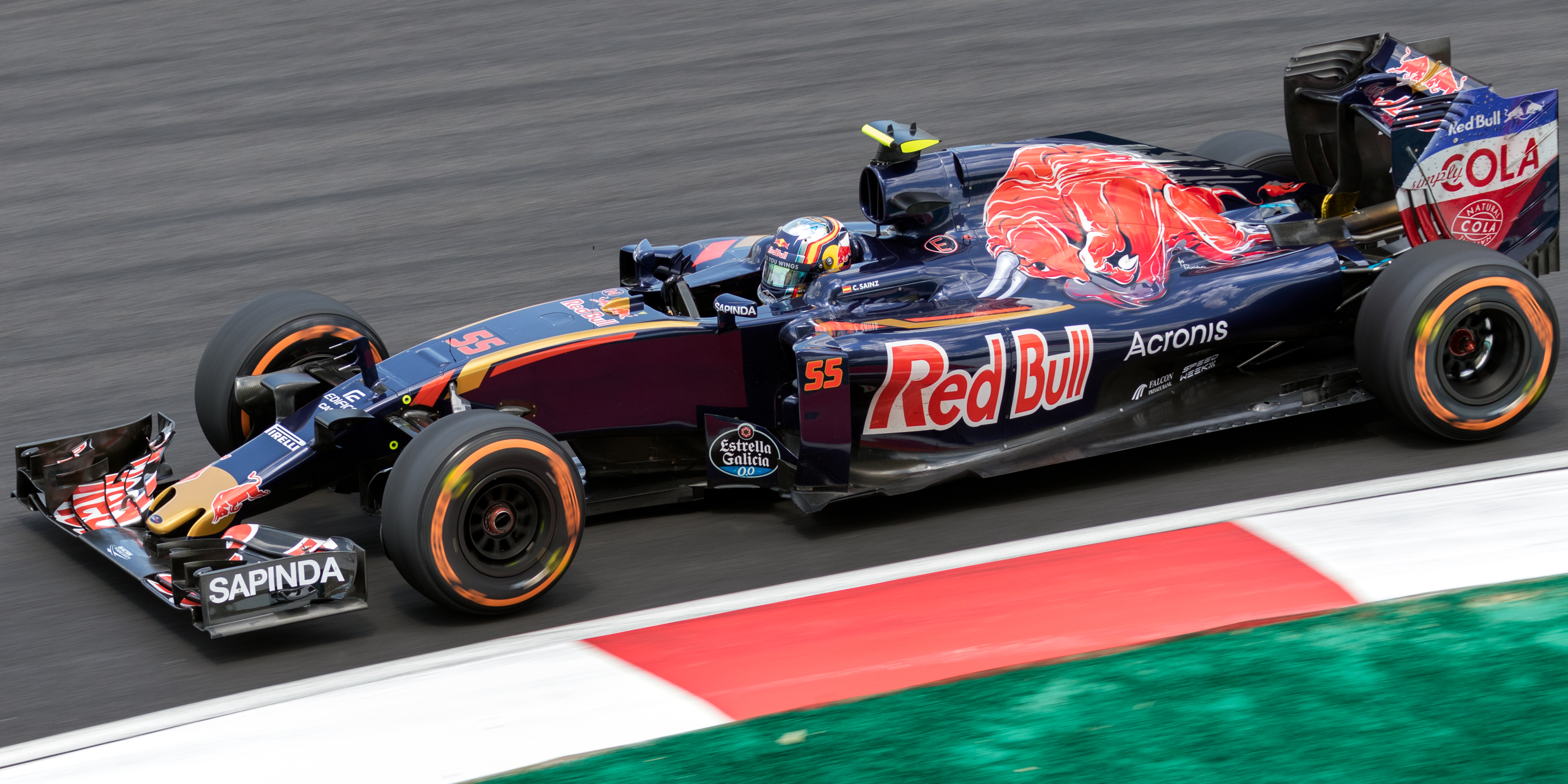
- The Toro Rosso STR11, driven by Carlos Sainz, Jr., during the Malaysian Grand Prix
- Category: Formula One
- Constructor: Toro Rosso
- Designers: James Key (Technical Director); Ben Waterhouse (Deputy Technical Director); Paolo Marabini (Chief Designer – Composites and Structures); Mark Tatham (Chief Designer – Mechanical and Systems); Phil Arnaboldi (Chief Designer – Concept Design); Jody Egginton (Head of Vehicle Performance); Claudio Balestri (Head of Vehicle Dynamics); Brendan Gilhome (Head of Aerodynamics); Ben Mallock (Deputy Head of Aerodynamics)
- Predecessor: Toro Rosso STR10
- Successor: Toro Rosso STR12

Technical specifications
- Chassis: Carbon-fibre composite survival cell
- Suspension (front): Upper and lower carbon wishbones, pushrod, torsion bar springs, central damper and anti-roll bars. Sachs dampers
- Suspension (rear): Upper and lower carbon wishbones, pullrod, torsion bar springs, central damper and anti-roll bars. Sachs dampers
- Length: Over 5,300 mm (209 in)
- Width: 1,800 mm (71 in)
- Height: 950 mm (37 in)
- Wheelbase: 3,700 mm (146 in)
- Engine: Ferrari 060 1.6 L (98 cu in) direct injection V6 single-turbocharged engine, limited to 15,000 rpm in a mid-mounted, rear-wheel drive layout
- Electric motor: Kinetic and thermal energy recovery systems
- Transmission: Integrated gearbox developed jointly by Red Bull Technology and Ferrari 8 forward gears + 1 reverse sequential gearbox with hydraulically actuated paddle shift with Scuderia Toro Rosso housing
- Battery: Lithium-ion batteries
- Weight: 702 kg (1,548 lb) including driver
- Fuel: Shell V-Power Nitro+ 98 RON unleaded racing gasoline
- Lubricants: Shell Helix Ultra
- Brakes: Brembo carbon discs with aluminium calipers
- Tyres: Pirelli P Zero (dry) tyres Pirelli Cinturato (wet) tyres

Competition history
- Notable entrants: Scuderia Toro Rosso
- Notable drivers: 26. (Russia) Daniil Kvyat; 33. (Netherlands) Max Verstappen; 55. (Spain) Carlos Sainz, Jr.
- Debut: 2016 Australian Grand Prix
- Last event: 2016 Abu Dhabi Grand Prix
Races	Wins	Podiums	Poles	F/Laps
21	0	0	0	1

The Toro Rosso STR11 is a Formula One racing car designed by Scuderia Toro Rosso to compete in the 2016 Formula One season. The car was driven by Carlos Sainz, Jr. and Daniil Kvyat, who swapped seats with Max Verstappen, who drove the car in the first four Grands Prix of the season. It used customer Ferrari's 2015-specification power unit, the 060.

== History ==
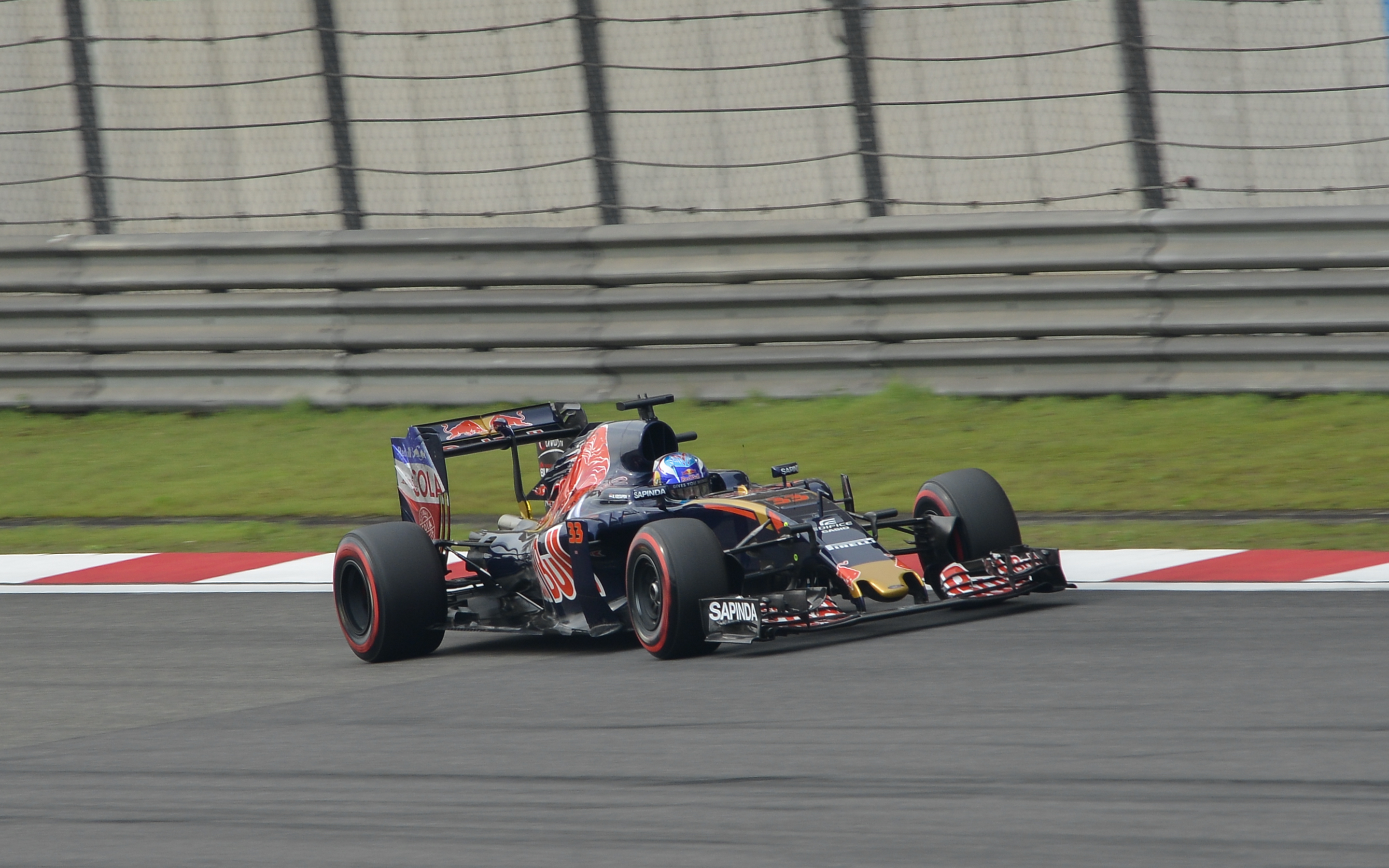
Verstappen at the Chinese Grand Prix

Prior to the 2016 season, both Toro Rosso and parent team Red Bull Racing used engines supplied by Renault. However, frustrated by the unreliability of the Renault Energy F1-2015 and its lack of power relative to rivals Mercedes and Ferrari, Red Bull terminated the partnership at the end of the 2015 season. While Red Bull later renewed the relationship—albeit with engines rebadged as TAG Heuer—Toro Rosso secured a new supply deal with Ferrari. Given the lateness of the deal, the substantial revisions made to the 059 series of engines between the 2015 and 2016 seasons, and the time taken to manufacture new components, Ferrari secured permission from the FIA to supply Toro Rosso with a 2015-specification 060 engine, but no direct factory support from Ferrari as opposed to the 061 used by Ferrari's works team and customer teams Haas and Sauber. Toro Rosso had already collaborated with Ferrari from 2007 through 2013.

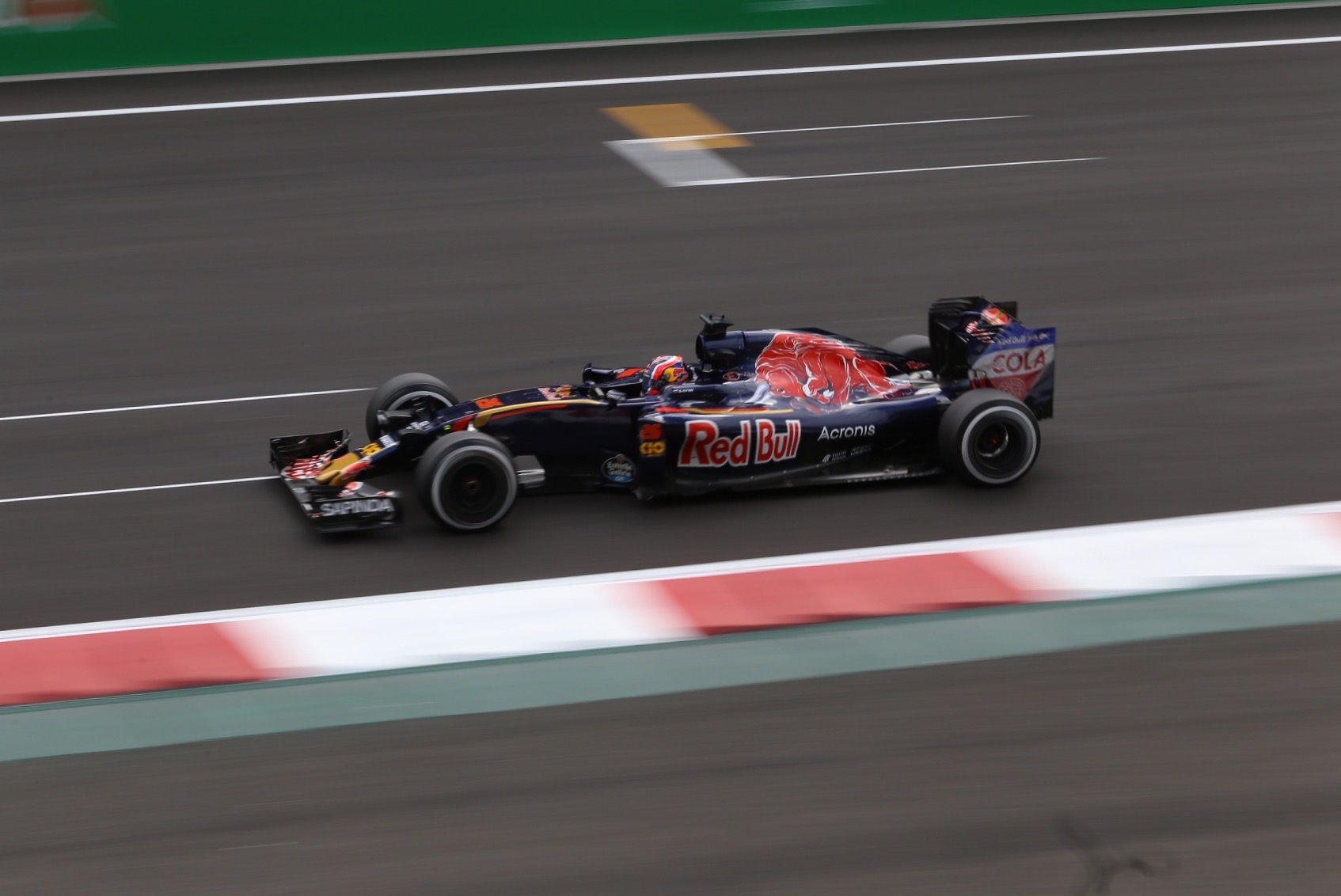
Kvyat at the Mexican Grand Prix

The car proved to be reasonably competitive, but not enough to escape from the large midfield group. Verstappen scored 13 points before his promotion to Red Bull Racing after the Russian Grand Prix in an exchange of places with Daniil Kvyat, whilst Sainz Jr. was the most successful driver in the STR11 car by scoring 46 points. Kvyat endured his worst season driving for Toro Rosso following his demotion, picking up only four points throughout the remainder of the season. The team finished seventh in the Constructors' Championship – the same position as in 2015, but with four fewer points.

== Livery ==
This was the last Toro Rosso car featured with a distinctive charging bull since their debut with the STR1 in 2006. Both Nova Chemicals and Cepsa sponsorships were terminated; Sainz' personal sponsor, Estrella Galicia retained for the second year with the team present on the bargeboard.

== Complete Formula One results ==
(key) (results in bold indicate pole position; results in italics indicate fastest lap)

Year	Entrant	Engine	Tyres	Drivers	Grands Prix																					Points	WCC
Year	Entrant	Engine	Tyres	Drivers	AUS	BHR	CHN	RUS	ESP	MON	CAN	EUR	AUT	GBR	HUN	GER	BEL	ITA	SIN	MAL	JPN	USA	MEX	BRA	ABU	Points	WCC
2016	Scuderia Toro Rosso	Ferrari 060	**P**																								
2016	Scuderia Toro Rosso	Ferrari 060	**P**	(Russia) Daniil Kvyat					10	Ret	12	Ret	Ret	10	16	15	14	Ret	9	14	13	11	18	13	Ret	**63**	**7th**
2016	Scuderia Toro Rosso	Ferrari 060	**P**	(Spain) Carlos Sainz, Jr.	9	Ret	9	12	6	8	9	Ret	8	8	8	14	Ret	15	14	11	17	6	16	6	Ret	**63**	**7th**
2016	Scuderia Toro Rosso	Ferrari 060	**P**	(Netherlands) Max Verstappen	10	6	8	Ret																		**63**	**7th**
