= Toro Rosso STR12 =

Formula One racing car

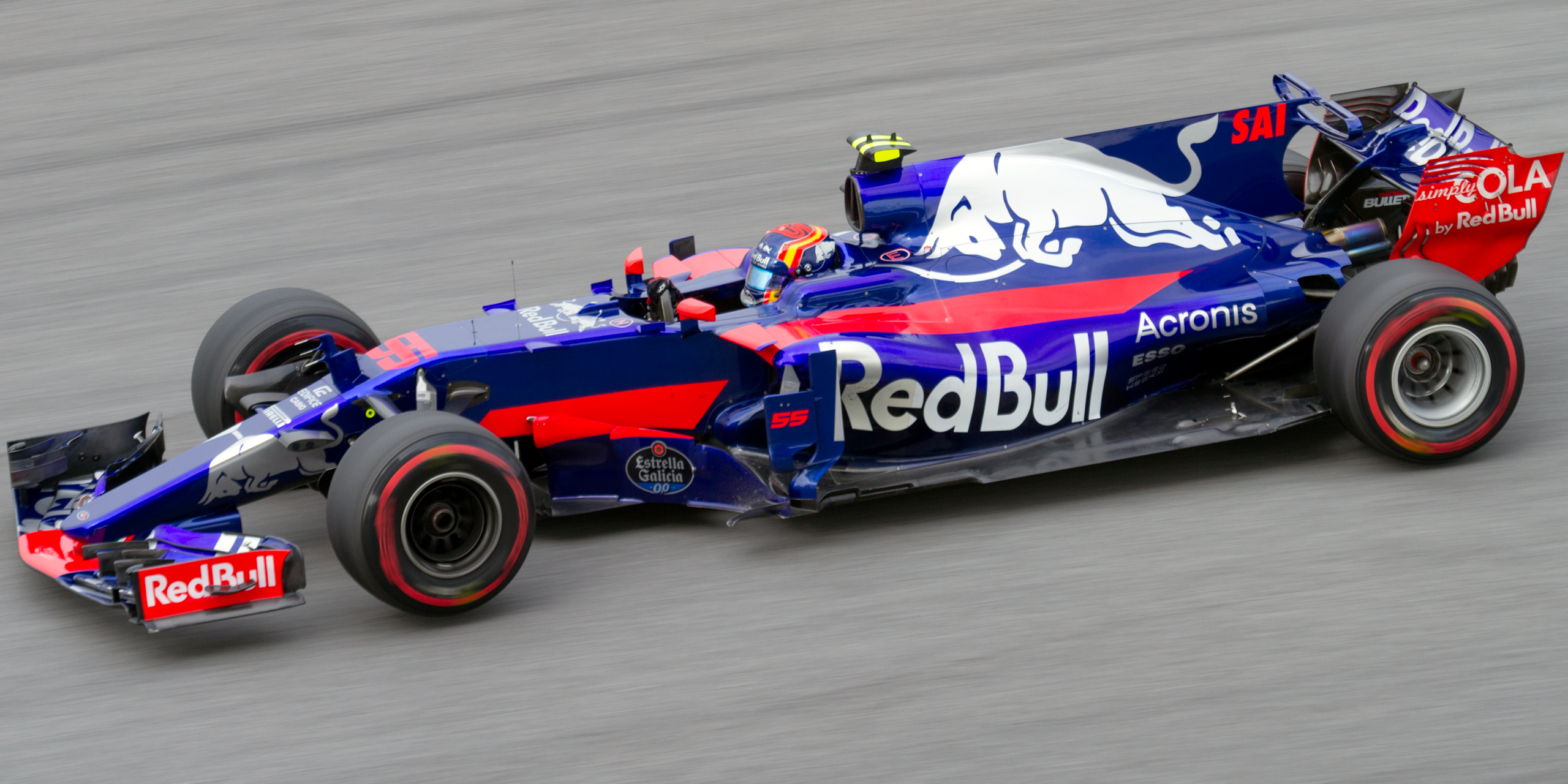
- Carlos Sainz Jr. driving the STR12 at the Malaysian Grand Prix
- Category: Formula One
- Constructor: Toro Rosso
- Designers: James Key (Technical Director); Ben Waterhouse (Deputy Technical Director); Paolo Marabini (Chief Designer – Composites and Structures); Mark Tatham (Chief Designer – Mechanical and Systems); Phil Arnaboldi (Chief Designer – Concept Design); Jody Egginton (Head of Vehicle Performance); Claudio Balestri (Head of Vehicle Dynamics; Brendan Gilhome (Head of Aerodynamics); Ben Mallock (Deputy Head of Aerodynamics)
- Predecessor: Toro Rosso STR11
- Successor: Scuderia Toro Rosso STR13

Technical specifications
- Chassis: Carbon-fibre composite survival cell
- Suspension (front): Upper and lower carbon wishbones, pushrod, torsion bar springs, central damper and anti-roll bars. Sachs dampers
- Suspension (rear): Upper and lower carbon wishbones, pullrod, torsion bar springs, central damper and anti-roll bars. Sachs dampers
- Length: 5,250 mm (207 in)
- Width: 2,000 mm (79 in)
- Height: 950 mm (37 in)
- Wheelbase: 3,500 mm (138 in)
- Engine: Renault R.E.17 (rebadged as Toro Rosso), 1.6 L (98 cu in) direct injection V6 turbocharged engine, limited to 15,000 rpm in a mid-mounted, rear-wheel drive layout
- Electric motor: Kinetic and thermal energy recovery systems
- Transmission: Red Bull Technology Eight-speed + one reverse sequential, longitudinally mounted with hydraulic system for power shift and clutch operation with limited-slip differential
- Weight: 728 kg (1,605 lb)
- Fuel: Esso / Mobil
- Lubricants: Mobil 1
- Brakes: Brembo carbon discs, calipers and pads
- Tyres: Pirelli P Zero (dry) tyres Pirelli Cinturato (wet) tyres

Competition history
- Notable entrants: Scuderia Toro Rosso
- Notable drivers: 10. (France) Pierre Gasly; 26. (Russia) Daniil Kvyat; 28/39. (New Zealand) Brendon Hartley; 55. (Spain) Carlos Sainz, Jr.
- Debut: 2017 Australian Grand Prix
- Last event: 2017 Abu Dhabi Grand Prix
Races	Wins	Podiums	Poles	F/Laps
20	0	0	0	0

The Toro Rosso STR12 is a Formula One racing car designed and constructed by Scuderia Toro Rosso to compete during the 2017 Formula One season. The car made its competitive début at the 2017 Australian Grand Prix. It was initially driven by Daniil Kvyat and Carlos Sainz, Jr., however both drivers were replaced by Pierre Gasly and Brendon Hartley towards the end of the season, after the former was dropped from the Red Bull programme, and the latter began a 2018 contract with Renault four races early.

The radical regulation changes meant that the STR12 started on a clean sheet of paper, but it was designed and built by the same people in Faenza and Bicester who produced its predecessor, which was regarded as an excellent package. The STR12 is powered by engines supplied by Renault after the team used 2015-specification Ferrari power units throughout the 2016 season; however, the engines were rebadged and the engine and chassis package run under the name 'Toro Rosso'.

== Season summary ==
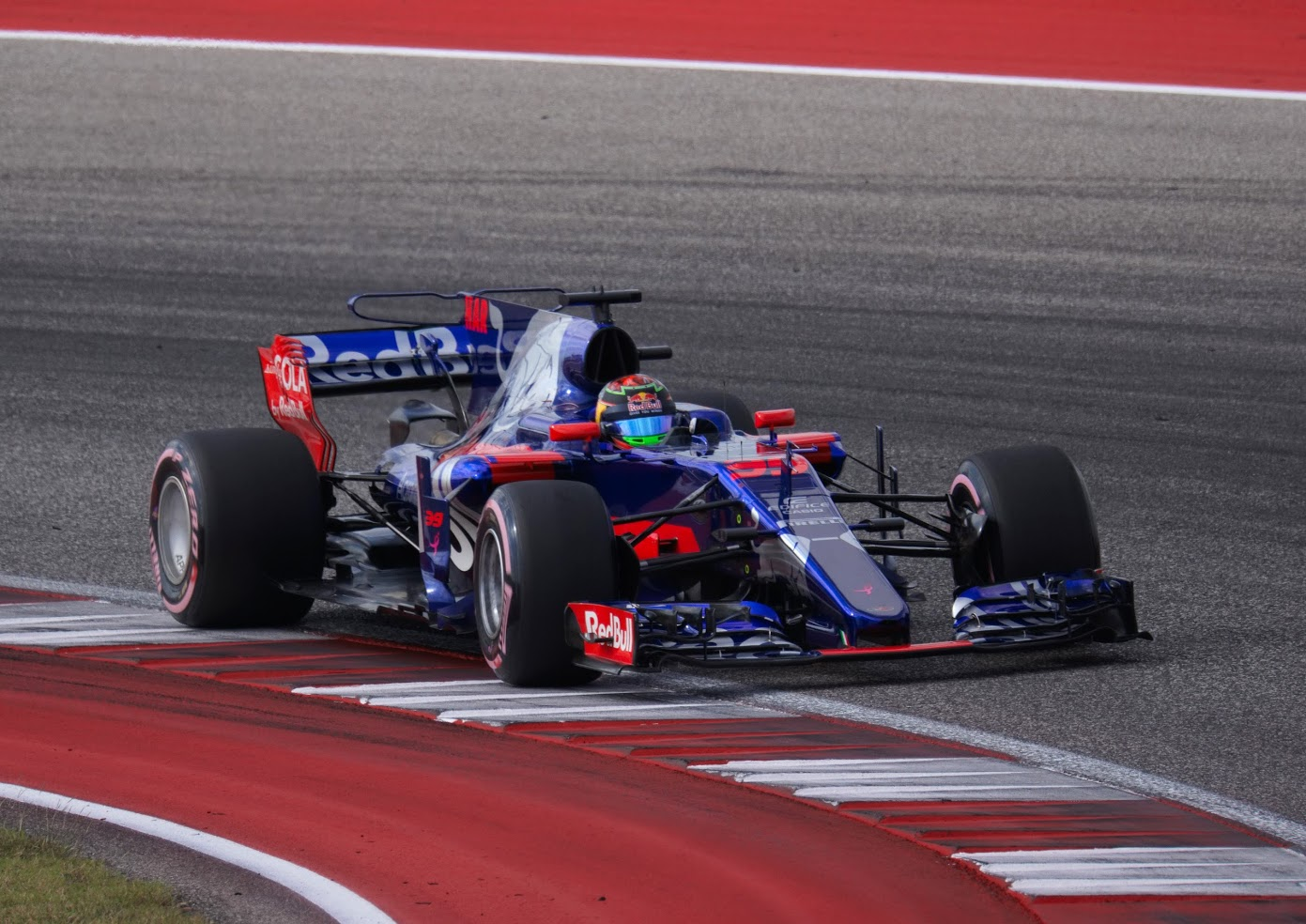
Brendon Hartley making his debut for Toro Rosso during the United States Grand Prix

Aiming high in 2017, two driver changes through the year derailed the team's hopes of securing a sixth-place World Constructors' Championship finish. Sainz had a year of ups and downs with the team, finishing in the points position on nine occasions, but retiring on six occasions. He finished an electrifying 4th place at Singapore. Sainz collected 48 points for the team over his 16 race span at the team. Kvyat had a sub-par year, starting the season off well with a ninth-place finish in Australia. He also scored points in Spain and the United States, but collected only 5 points over the course of 15 races. The Italian team finished the season in 7th place in the Constructors' Standings with 53 championship points.

== Livery ==
The STR12 sported a new royal blue livery (to match with the Italy's sacred national color Gli Azzurri) with a red accents across the side of the car. This was the final year for Estrella Galicia sponsorship, following Sainz' final year with the team.

== Complete Formula One results ==
(key) (results in bold indicate pole position; results in italics indicate fastest lap)

Year	Entrant	Engine	Tyres	Drivers	Grands Prix																				Points	WCC
Year	Entrant	Engine	Tyres	Drivers	AUS	CHN	BHR	RUS	ESP	MON	CAN	AZE	AUT	GBR	HUN	BEL	ITA	SIN	MAL	JPN	USA	MEX	BRA	ABU	Points	WCC
2017	Scuderia Toro Rosso	Renault R.E.17	**P**																							
2017	Scuderia Toro Rosso	Renault R.E.17	**P**	(France) Pierre Gasly															14	13		13	12	16	53	7th
2017	Scuderia Toro Rosso	Renault R.E.17	**P**	(New Zealand) Brendon Hartley																	13	Ret	Ret	15	53	7th
2017	Scuderia Toro Rosso	Renault R.E.17	**P**	(Russia) Daniil Kvyat	9	Ret	12	12	9	14†	Ret	Ret	16	15	11	12	12	Ret			10				53	7th
2017	Scuderia Toro Rosso	Renault R.E.17	**P**	(Spain) Carlos Sainz, Jr.	8	7	Ret	10	7	6	Ret	8	Ret	Ret	7	10	14	4	Ret	Ret					53	7th

Notes

- † – Driver failed to finish the race, but was classified as they had completed greater than 90% of the race distance.
