= Toro Rosso STR10 =

Formula One racing car

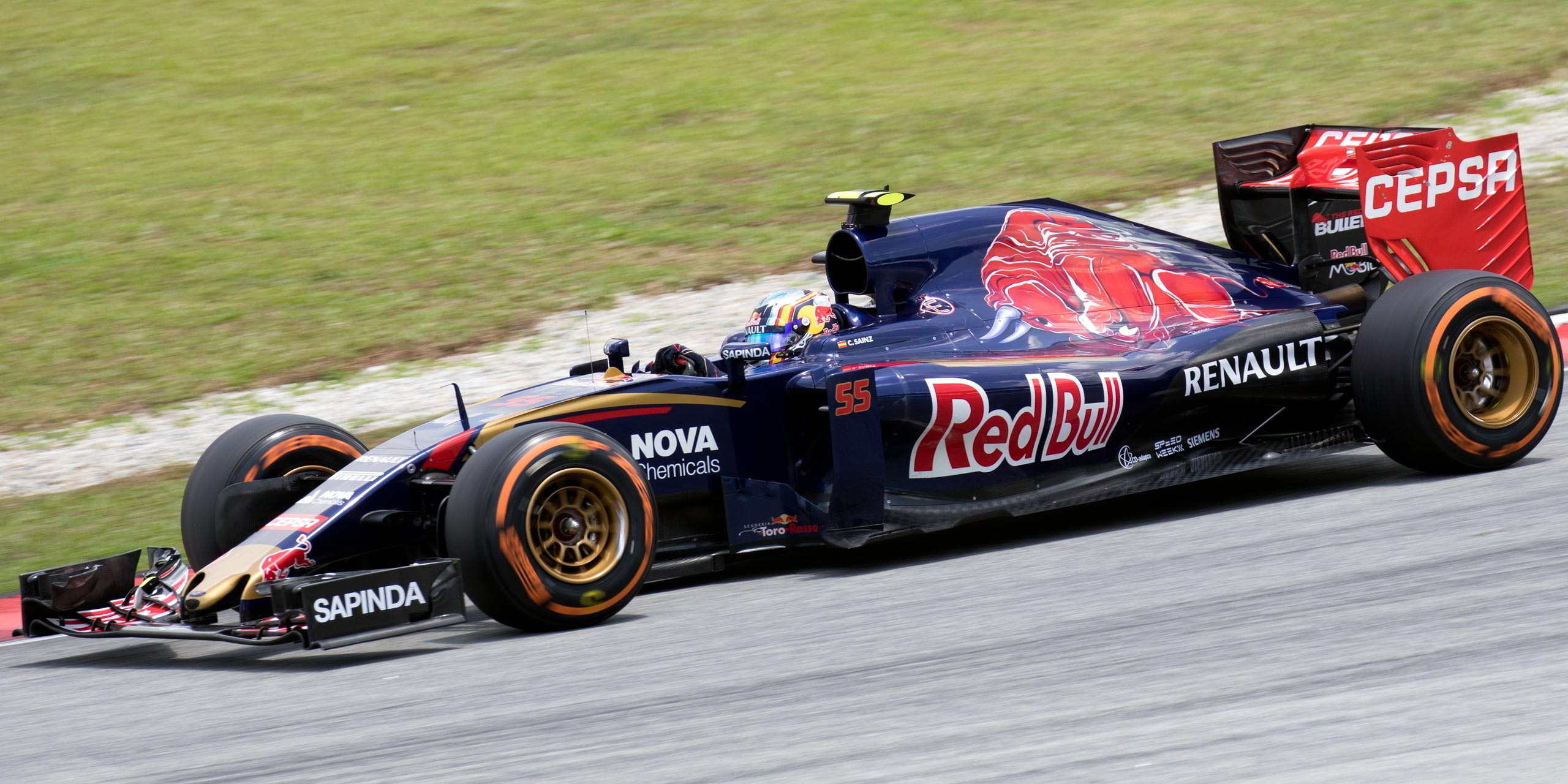
- Carlos Sainz, Jr., driving an STR10 during the Malaysian Grand Prix
- Category: Formula One
- Constructor: Toro Rosso
- Designers: James Key (Technical Director); Ben Waterhouse (Deputy Technical Director); Paolo Marabini (Chief Designer – Composites and Structures); Matteo Piraccini (Chief Designer – Mechanical and Systems); Jody Egginton (Head of Vehicle Performance); Claudio Balestri (Head of Vehicle Dynamics); Brendan Gilhome (Head of Aerodynamics); Ben Mallock (Deputy Head of Aerodynamics)
- Predecessor: Toro Rosso STR9
- Successor: Toro Rosso STR11

Technical specifications
- Chassis: Moulded carbon-fibre with honeycomb structure
- Suspension (front): Upper and lower carbon wishbones, pushrod, torsion bar springs, central damper and anti-roll bars
- Suspension (rear): Upper and lower carbon wishbones, pullrod, torsion bar springs, central damper and anti-roll bars
- Length: 5,100 mm (201 in; 17 ft)
- Width: 1,800 mm (71 in; 6 ft)
- Height: 950 mm (37 in; 3 ft)
- Axle track: Front: 1,470 mm (58 in); Rear: 1,405 mm (55 in)
- Wheelbase: 3,100–3,200 mm (122–126 in; 10–10 ft)
- Engine: Renault Energy F1-2015 1.6 L (98 cu in) V6 turbo (90°), limited to 15,000 RPM in a mid-mounted, rear-wheel drive layout
- Electric motor: Electronic resolution systems delivering 2 MJ (0.56 kWh) of energy directly to crankshaft and thermal energy recovery system delivering 2 MJ (0.56 kWh) of energy to turbine
- Transmission: Red Bull Technology 8-speed + 1 reverse. Hydraulically actuated, sequential with paddle shift
- Battery: Renault Sport F1 lithium-ion battery (up to 4 MJ (1.1 kWh) per lap), between 20–25 kg (44–55 lb)
- Power: 700 hp (522 kW) at 10,500 rpm 160 hp (119 kW) at 13,000 rpm (ERS)
- Weight: 702 kg (1,548 lb) including driver and fuel
- Fuel: Total (Note: Despite CEPSA is an oil and gas company as a major sponsor of Scuderia Toro Rosso since mid-2011 season, the CEPSA branding appears on the STR10, but the car uses Total fuel and lubricants.)
- Lubricants: Total
- Brakes: Brembo carbon brake discs, pads and 6-piston calipers with rear brake-by-wire
- Tyres: Pirelli P Zero radial dry slick and Pirelli Cinturato intermediate-wet treaded tyres AppTech forged magnesium alloy wheels

Competition history
- Notable drivers: 33. (Netherlands) Max Verstappen; 55. (Spain) Carlos Sainz, Jr.
- Debut: 2015 Australian Grand Prix
- Last event: 2015 Abu Dhabi Grand Prix
Races	Wins	Podiums	Poles	F/Laps
19	0	0	0	0

The Toro Rosso STR10 is a Formula One racing car which Scuderia Toro Rosso used to compete in the 2015 Formula One season. It was driven by Max Verstappen and Carlos Sainz, Jr.

== Design ==
The car was launched on 31 January 2015. Toro Rosso introduced an extensively modified STR10 for the final pre-season tests at the Barcelona circuit in late February, with a shorter nose, new aerodynamics and a new suspension. According to the team's technical director, James Key, this revised STR10 was "actually the 'real' racecar."

== Racing history ==
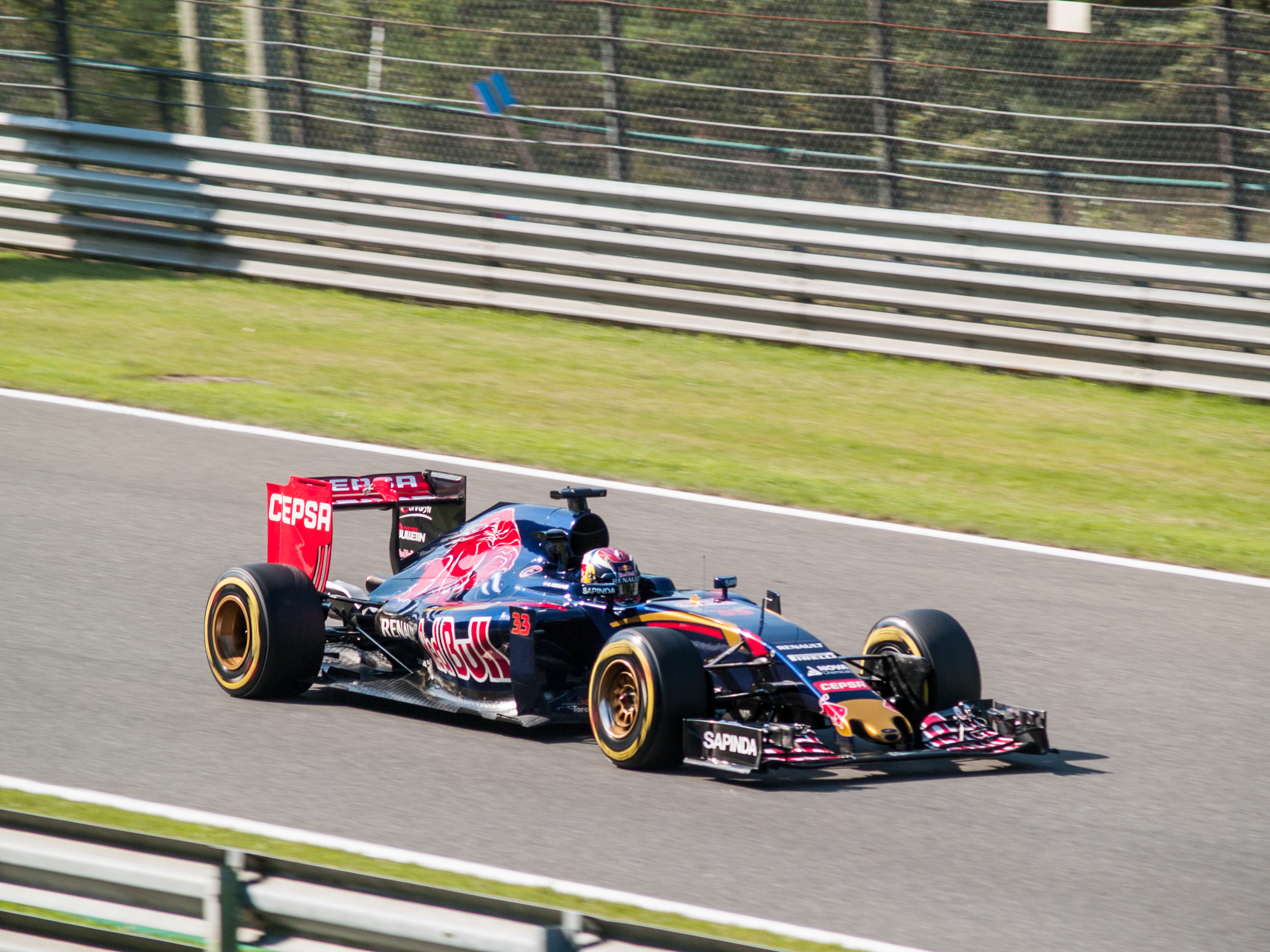
Verstappen at the Belgian Grand Prix

The car proved quite competitive throughout the season, managing to score 67 points and a pair of 4th places for Verstappen in the Hungarian and United States Grands Prix. The results allowed Toro Rosso to end the season with 7th place in the World Constructors' Championship, 11 points behind the Mercedes-powered Lotus. This was the last Renault-engine Toro Rosso, before the team returned to Ferrari power units for the 2016 season.

== Livery ==
Despite having a very similar livery to previous seasons, it had a minor change on the pinstriping. This was the fourth and final year for both Nova Chemicals and Cepsa sponsorships as both were withdrawn from the team. Falcon Private Bank was replaced with Sapinda Group.

== Complete Formula One results ==
(key) (results in bold indicate pole position; results in italics indicate fastest lap)

Year	Entrant	Engine	Tyres	Drivers	Grands Prix																			Points	WCC
Year	Entrant	Engine	Tyres	Drivers	AUS	MAL	CHN	BHR	ESP	MON	CAN	AUT	GBR	HUN	BEL	ITA	SIN	JPN	RUS	USA	MEX	BRA	ABU	Points	WCC
2015	Scuderia Toro Rosso	Renault; Energy F1-2015	**P**	(Netherlands) Max Verstappen	Ret	7	17^{†}	Ret	11	Ret	15	8	Ret	4	8	12	8	9	10	4	9	9	16	67	7th
2015	Scuderia Toro Rosso	Renault; Energy F1-2015	**P**	(Spain) Carlos Sainz Jr.	9	8	13	Ret	9	10	12	Ret	Ret	Ret	Ret	11	9	10	Ret	7	13	Ret	11	67	7th

^{†} Driver failed to finish the race, but was classified as they had completed greater than 90% of the race distance.
