= Scuderia Toro Rosso =

Former Italian Formula One racing team

Coordinates: 44.3078983°N 11.8617271°E

- Full name: Red Bull Toro Rosso Honda (2018–2019); Scuderia Toro Rosso (2006–2017)
- Base: Faenza, Italy; Bicester, Oxfordshire, United Kingdom (Aerodynamics)
- Founder(s): Dietrich Mateschitz
- Noted staff: Helmut Marko (Advisor to Red Bull GmbH); Franz Tost (Team Principal)
- Noted drivers: (Thailand) Alexander Albon (Spain) Jaime Alguersuari (France) Sébastien Bourdais (Switzerland) Sébastien Buemi (France) Pierre Gasly (New Zealand) Brendon Hartley (Russia) Daniil Kvyat (Italy) Vitantonio Liuzzi (Australia) Daniel Ricciardo (Spain) Carlos Sainz Jr. (United States) Scott Speed (France) Jean-Éric Vergne (Netherlands) Max Verstappen (Germany) Sebastian Vettel
- Previous name: Minardi F1 Team
- Next name: Scuderia AlphaTauri

Formula One World Championship career
- First entry: 2006 Bahrain Grand Prix
- Races entered: 268
- Engines: Cosworth, Ferrari, Renault, Toro Rosso, (Note: In 2017, Toro Rosso used Renault R.E.17 power units. For sponsorship purposes, these engines were rebadged as "Toro Rosso".) Honda
- Constructors' Championships: 0 (best finish: 6th, 2008 & 2019)
- Drivers' Championships: 0 (best finish: 8th, Vettel, 2008)
- Race victories: 1
- Podiums: 3
- Points: 500
- Pole positions: 1
- Fastest laps: 1
- 2019 position: 6th (85 pts)
- Final entry: 2019 Abu Dhabi Grand Prix

Scuderia Toro Rosso S.p.A. (Italian pronunciation: [skudeˈriːa ˈtɔːro ˈrosso], commonly known as Toro Rosso or by its abbreviation STR, was an Italian Formula One constructor. It was one of two Formula One constructors owned by Austrian conglomerate company Red Bull, the other being Red Bull Racing. Toro Rosso functioned as a junior team to Red Bull Racing, with the aim of developing the skills of promising drivers for the senior team. The constructor made its racing début in the 2006 season, moving to complete independence from its sister team in 2010. The team changed its name to Scuderia AlphaTauri in 2020 to promote parent company Red Bull's fashion label of the same name.

The team was established after Paul Stoddart sold his remaining interest in the Minardi team at the end of 2005 to Red Bull's owner, Dietrich Mateschitz, and Minardi was renamed Toro Rosso.

Mateschitz subsequently struck a 50/50 joint-ownership deal with former Formula One driver Gerhard Berger before the start of the season. In late November 2008, Red Bull regained total ownership of Toro Rosso after buying back Berger's share of the team.

From 2007 to 2013, Toro Rosso used Ferrari V8 engines, taking over the contract that their senior team broke from at the end of 2006 to switch engine builders to Renault. For 2014, Toro Rosso switched to Renault engines as well, but in 2016 returned to using Ferrari power. However, they switched back to Renault in 2017 (albeit under 'Toro Rosso' branding), then in 2018 to Honda. The team principal was Franz Tost, formerly of BMW's motor sport division.

Vitantonio Liuzzi scored the team's first point in its first season at the 2006 United States Grand Prix. The team's first podium and only pole position and victory were scored by Sebastian Vettel at the 2008 Italian Grand Prix. Max Verstappen became the youngest driver to compete in Formula One, at 17 years and 166 days old, in a Toro Rosso at the 2015 Australian Grand Prix.

== Origins ==
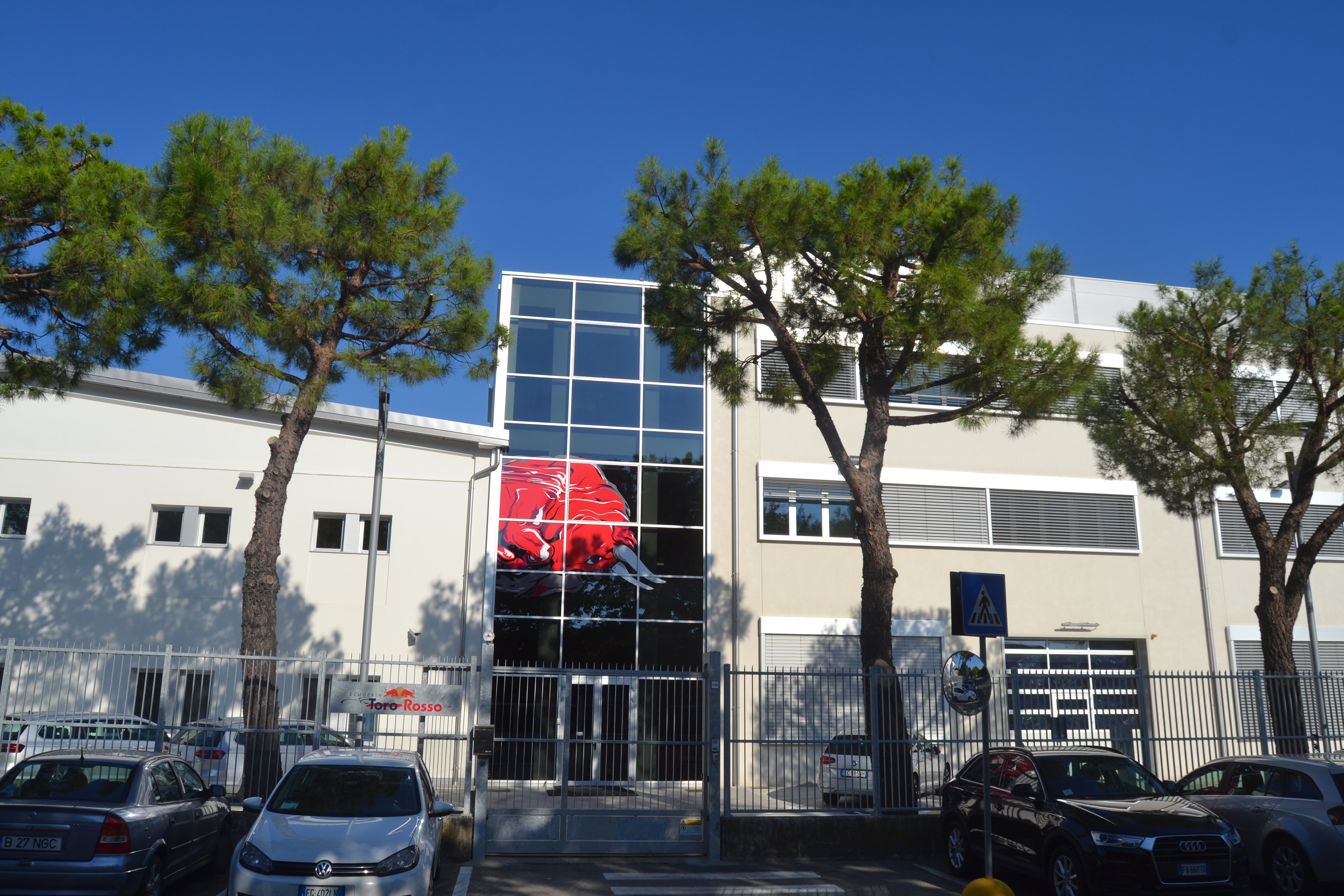
Toro Rosso headquarters in Faenza, Italy (2016)

Minardi had competed in Formula One from 1985 to 2005. Despite having a large fan base, it had been one of the least competitive teams in the sport, never achieving a podium finish and only finishing as high as fourth in three races.

Minardi owner Paul Stoddart claimed to have had 41 approaches to buy the team, but preferred to sell it to someone who could 'take it further' than he could and who would maintain it in its traditional base in Italy. Included in the terms of the deal with Red Bull GmbH was the clause that the team must keep its headquarters in Faenza, Italy until at least the 2007 season.

Whilst Red Bull abandoned the Minardi name in line with their own sponsorship and marketing plans, the use of the Italian language in the name was intended to hint at the team's Italian heritage. Red Bull changed the name of the team immediately after taking control of the team on 1 November 2005. It was initially reported as 'Squadra Toro Rosso' (team Red Bull) but then changed because squadra in Italian depicts a 'squad' like a football team, to 'Scuderia Toro Rosso'. Scuderia is Italian for a stable reserved for racing horses, and is also commonly applied to Italian motor racing teams, such as Ferrari.

Many Minardi fans were upset by the name change to Scuderia Toro Rosso and over 15,000 signed an online petition to keep the Minardi name, but were unsuccessful.

== Racing history ==
=== Cosworth customer engines (2006) ===
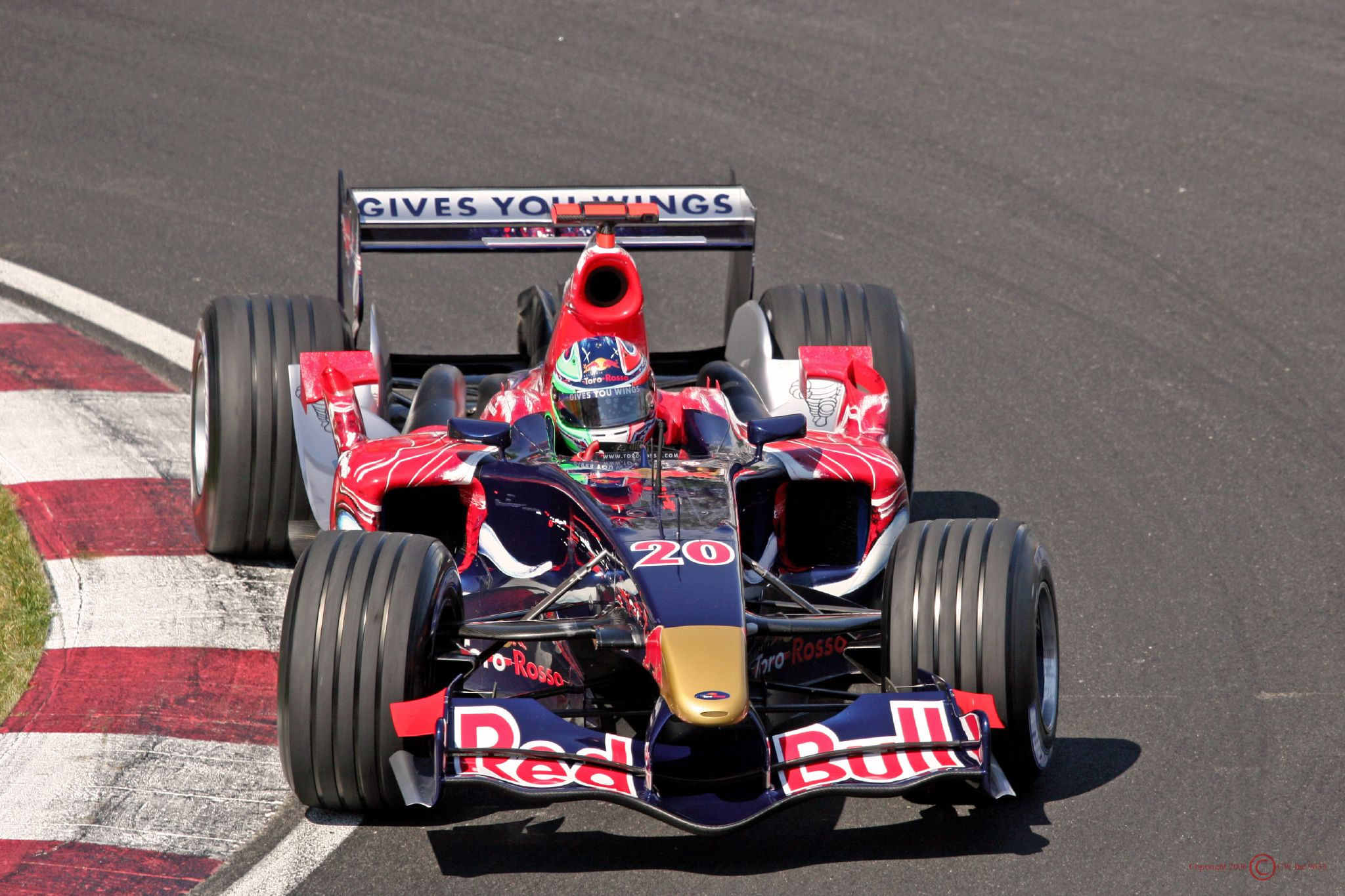
Vitantonio Liuzzi at the 2006 Canadian Grand Prix

Vitantonio Liuzzi and Scott Speed were the 2006 race drivers of the STR1, with Neel Jani filling the test/third driver role. Liuzzi had raced part-time for Red Bull Racing in 2005, while Speed entered F1 following the Red Bull Driver Search in the United States. Jani was the test driver for Sauber Petronas in 2004.

The 2006 chassis was a modified version of the 2005 Red Bull Racing RB1. Some teams felt that this infringed the Concorde Agreement as each team is expected to design their own car. Toro Rosso claim that this design was originally produced during 2004 by Jaguar Racing, Red Bull's predecessor, and that the intellectual rights had belonged to the Ford Motor Company, Jaguar Racing's parent company, with Toro Rosso inheriting the rights after Jaguar Racing was sold.

The team used Minardi's contracted supply of rev limited and air restricted 2005-spec Cosworth TJ2005-2 3.0-litre V10 engines instead of newly built Cosworth CA2006 2.4-litre V8 engines as CA2006 V8 naturally-aspirated engines were too expensive for smaller teams as well as transmission package from Red Bull Technology. This concession had been granted to assist less well funded teams by avoiding the cost of sourcing a new supply of V8 engines as required by the 2006 regulations. The continuation of this arrangement after the Red Bull takeover caused friction with other teams, in particular Super Aguri and Midland who felt that the engine conferred too much of an advantage. They contended that the concession to allow the team use a V10 engine was based on Minardi's poor financial situation, and should not have continued to apply after the team achieved a completely different financial footing. For tyre suppliers, Toro Rosso was reunited with Michelin tyres who had last supplied Faenza-based Minardi in the 2001 and 2002 seasons.

As the season progressed, the Toro Rossos began to struggle in qualifying as their competitors developed their new V8 engines to rev closer to 20,000 rpm to get more power. To try to balance the playing field, Toro Rosso asked for an extra 500 rpm for qualifying, however the FIA permitted them only 300 rpm.

=== Ferrari customer engines – first spell (2007–2013) ===
==== 2007 ====
For the 2007 season, Toro Rosso began using the 2006-specification Ferrari 056 V8 engine rather than 2007 works spec due to cost reasons, taking over the contract that their senior team broke from by switching to customer Renault power.

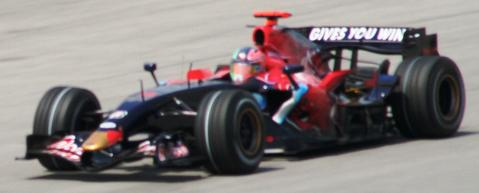
Vitantonio Liuzzi driving for the team at the 2007 Malaysian Grand Prix

At the launch of the STR2 on 13 February, Toro Rosso confirmed Liuzzi as a 2007 driver. In testing in Bahrain on 24 February, Scott Speed was confirmed as the team's second driver. Four-time Champ Car champion Sébastien Bourdais was an occasional test driver several times during the season.

The team appointed new technical director Giorgio Ascanelli to replace temporary stand-in Alex Hitzinger on 2 April.

The 2007 season was generally disappointing, with poor reliability and driver errors leading to a low finishing record. Following the European Grand Prix, Speed was dropped under controversial circumstances and was replaced by BMW Sauber development driver Sebastian Vettel who was later confirmed for 2008.

At the Chinese Grand Prix, Toro Rosso scored their best results, with Vettel finishing fourth and Vitantonio Liuzzi sixth, scoring eight points for the team. These were also the drivers' best finishes in Formula One to that point. It was a marked improvement over the preceding Japanese Grand Prix, where Vettel crashed into Mark Webber's Red Bull under safety car conditions while they were running second and third respectively, and Liuzzi lost a potential point after a 25-second penalty for overtaking Adrian Sutil's Spyker for eighth under waved yellow flags dropped him to ninth.

With the 2008 Concorde Agreement outlawing customer cars from 2010 onwards, Dietrich Mateschitz put the Toro Rosso team up for sale in March 2008. He aimed to secure a buyer by the end of 2009, while the team continued in its present guise until then.

==== 2008 ====
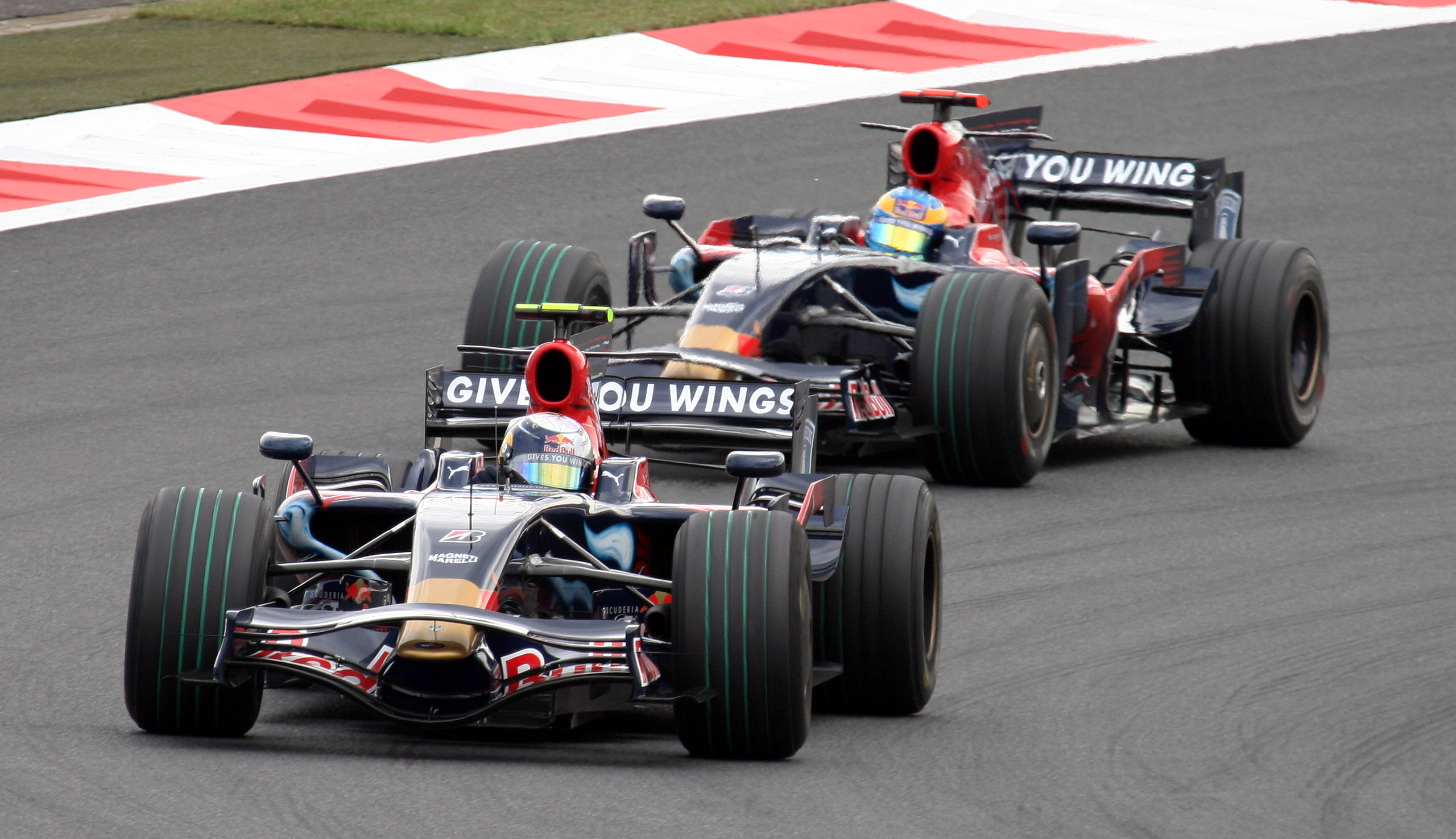
Sebastian Vettel leads Sébastien Bourdais at the 2008 Japanese Grand Prix.

Scuderia Toro Rosso's drivers for 2008 were Sebastian Vettel and Sébastien Bourdais. The team continue to utilize 2007-spec Ferrari engines in 2008. Bourdais earned his first career points with a 7th-place finish at the Australian Grand Prix. Vettel scored his first points of the season with a 5th-place finish at the Monaco Grand Prix. The team showed steady improvement throughout the season, leading up to a solid performance at the Belgian Grand Prix which saw both cars running in the top six for most of the race, and with Bourdais and Vettel running 3rd and 4th respectively on the final lap until cars on tyres better suited to the extreme wet conditions passed them, demoting Vettel to 5th and Bourdais to 7th. The double points finish moved STR above Honda and level with Williams in the Constructors' Championship.

The team pulled off a massive shock at the wet Italian Grand Prix, with Vettel claiming a first pole position and the first win for both himself and the team. This was the first win by a team based in Italy other than Ferrari since the 1957 German Grand Prix, which was won by Juan Manuel Fangio in a Maserati and also the first and only win for a Ferrari engine in a customer chassis. Vettel beat second-place Heikki Kovalainen by 12 seconds. Vettel was at it again in the next race, the Singapore Grand Prix, Formula One's first ever night race. Vettel qualified 7th and finished the race in 5th, while Bourdais could only manage 12th.

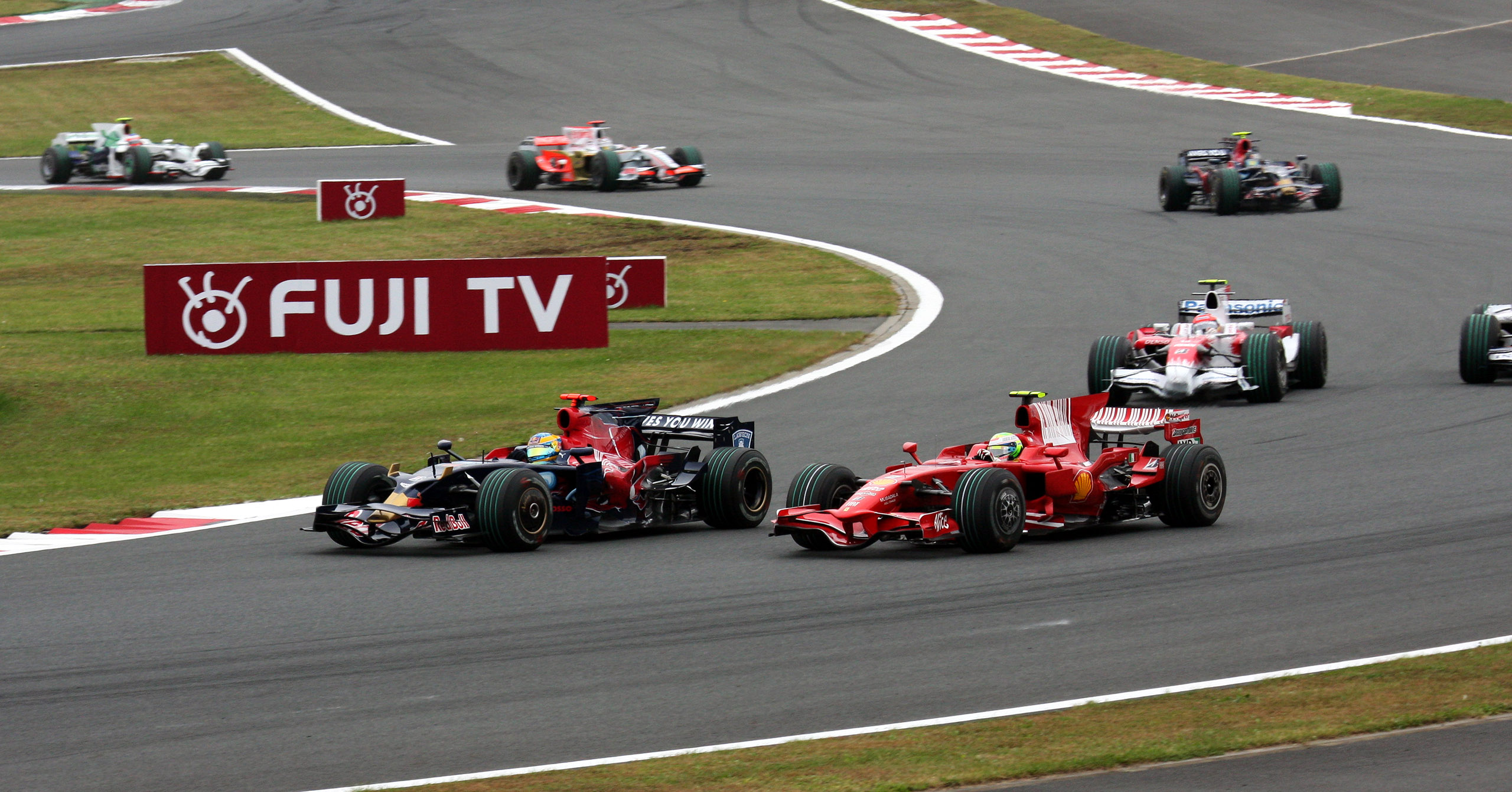
Sébastien Bourdais and Felipe Massa battling for position early on in the 2008 Japanese Grand Prix

At the next race in Japan, Vettel again showed his class finishing 6th. Bourdais, meanwhile, was doing well, until Felipe Massa, who had been running in 8th, tried to overtake Bourdais. Massa had climbed up to 8th place after having dropped down to 13th as a result of his drive-through and his first pit-stop. Just after Bourdais left the pitlane after making his final stop, Massa attempted to pass him and the two cars collided at the first corner. Massa spun, but rejoined the track and eventually finished 8th. Bourdais finished the race in 6th place, but had 25 seconds added to his overall time as penalty for the incident, dropping him down to 10th place. This ultimately had the effect of promoting Massa to 7th place, and giving him an extra championship point. It was a controversial penalty, and Bourdais was adamant that he was not to blame.

Vettel's performances earned him a place at the senior Red Bull team for 2009. However, his final drive for Toro Rosso saw him almost play a crucial role in the world championship decider in Brazil. In mixed conditions, Lewis Hamilton needed 5th place to clinch the championship, and was running in this position when he was overtaken by Vettel with two laps remaining. Unable to keep up, Hamilton dropped back, and only took the title when he and Vettel both overtook Timo Glock on the final lap.

In the end, Vettel scored 35 of the team's 39 points, and in doing so, helped Toro Rosso to actually outperform their senior Red Bull team for the first and only time in team history.

==== 2009 ====
With Vettel moving to Red Bull Racing replacing the retired David Coulthard, Sébastien Buemi and Sébastien Bourdais led the team's assault in the 2009 World Championship. After the previous year's success, several drivers wanted to drive for Toro Rosso, including Takuma Sato (who even did three tests with the team) and Bruno Senna. Toro Rosso unveiled their new car last of all the teams taking part in the 2009 season, on 9 March 2009. Before the season started, the team's boss Franz Tost said that it would be "difficult" to do as well as they did in the 2008 season. On 16 July 2009, the team announced that Sébastien Bourdais' contract was to be terminated with immediate effect due to disappointing results. On 20 July 2009, the team announced that Jaime Alguersuari would replace him as official driver for the rest of the season. Multiple WRC Champion Sébastien Loeb had been quoted in the French sports-paper L'Equipe as being interested in replacing Bourdais. It had been stated that Loeb would not be available to race in F1 until after the end of the WRC season. He would've been available to make his F1 début at the 2009 Abu Dhabi Grand Prix in November. However, this was not to be as the FIA denied him a super licence which is required to drive in Formula One. The season ended with Toro Rosso finishing in tenth and last place in the championship after being overtaken by Force India after their podium finish in Belgium. However, Toro Rosso's form picked up towards the end of the season with Sébastien Buemi scoring points in the final two races. However, Jaime Alguersuari failed to score any points in the season.

==== 2010 ====
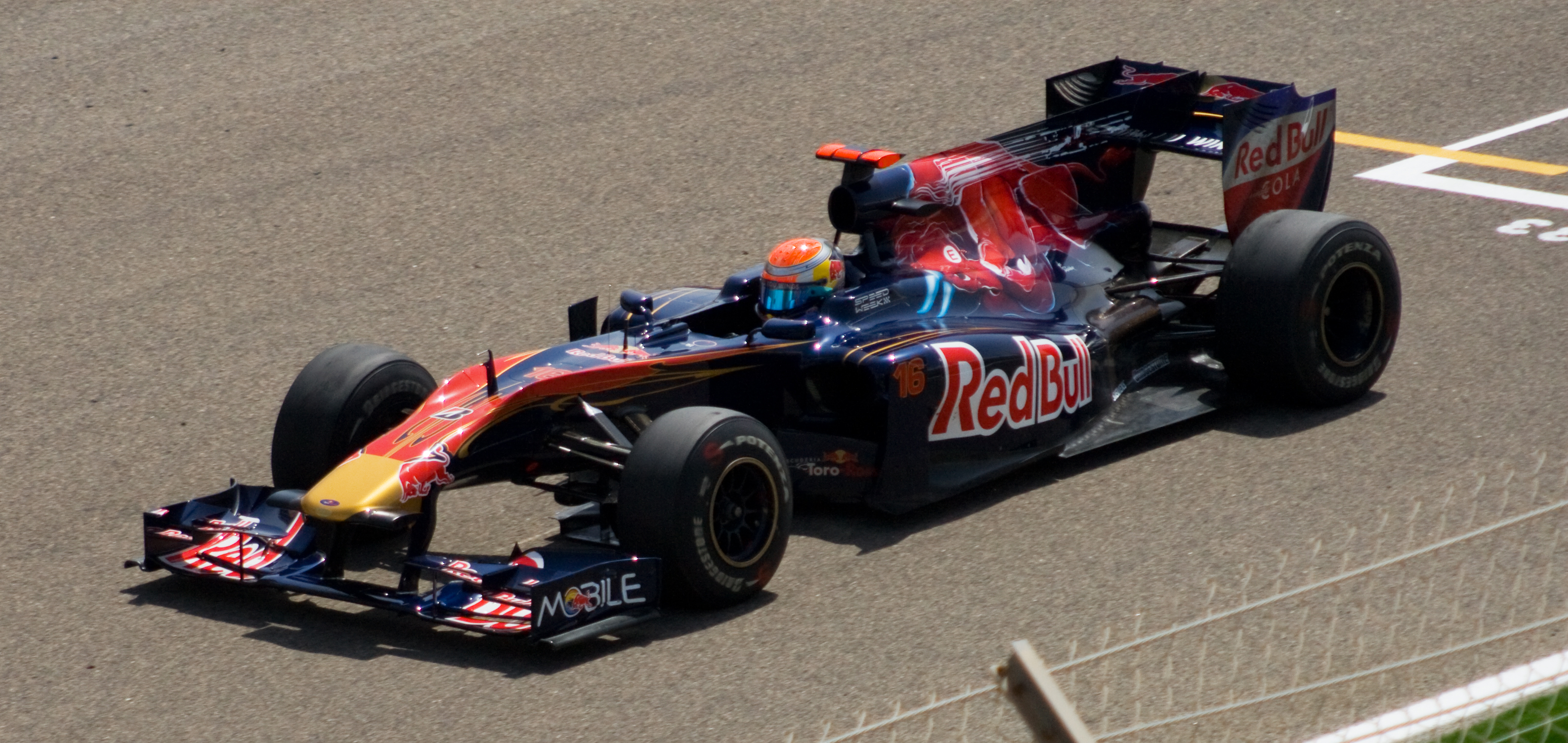
Sébastien Buemi testing the Toro Rosso STR5 during at the Bahrain International Circuit in 2010

Scuderia Toro Rosso confirmed that they would keep Sébastien Buemi and Jaime Alguersuari, in the hope of achieving better results. On 10 November 2009, Toro Rosso announced that Sébastien Buemi would continue to race for them in 2010. No official announcement of the second driver had been made up to then, however Jaime Alguersuari was reported to take the second race seat, as published on 26 November 2009. On 22 January 2010, the team confirmed the signing of Alguersuari, and he scored the first points of his career by finishing ninth under the new points system at the Malaysian Grand Prix. He finished tenth in Spain scoring a point thanks to Lewis Hamilton's penultimate lap crash. He also received a drive-through penalty in that race. At the next race in Monaco Buemi finished 11th and Alguersuari 12th, the last two runners at the end of the race. However, when Michael Schumacher received a 20-second penalty for a last turn overtake against Fernando Alonso, Buemi was moved up to tenth, scoring a point.

==== 2011 ====
Sébastien Buemi and Jaime Alguersuari were confirmed as drivers of the team's STR6 for 2011, Daniel Ricciardo would be the team's reserve and test driver, and would also take part in free practice at each of the Grands Prix. The STR6 was launched on 1 February in Valencia, Spain.

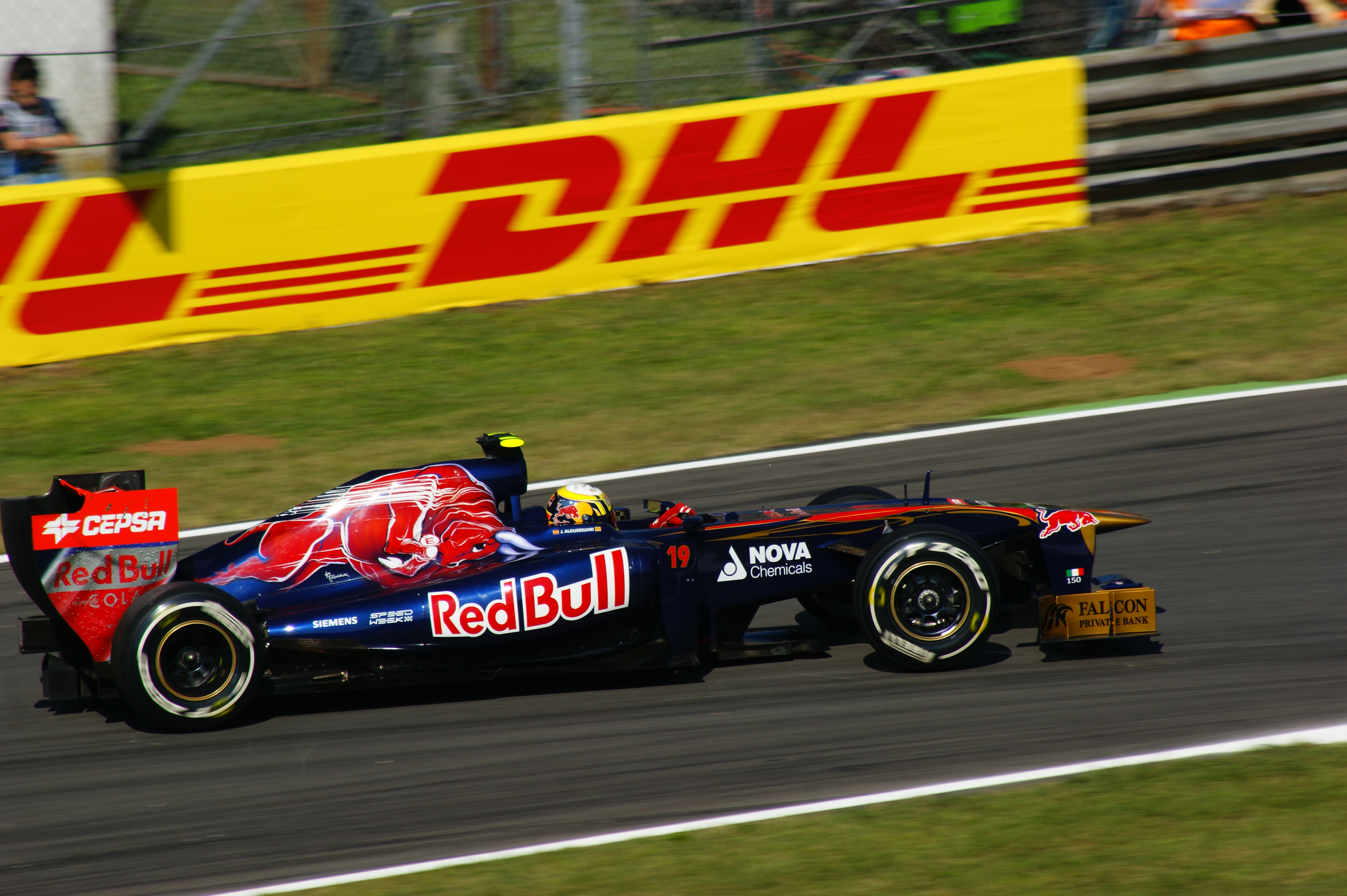
Jaime Alguersuari finished seventh, his best result in F1, with the team at the 2011 Italian Grand Prix.

At the beginning of the season in Australia, Buemi finished eighth and collected four championship points. The Malaysian Grand Prix saw no points while China saw both cars in the top 10 for qualifying, Alguersuari in seventh and Buemi in tenth. However Alguersuari turned out to be the race's only retirement and Buemi finished way down the field. Turkey saw Buemi finishing ninth while Spain was another bad race for the team with Alguersuari again failing to score. Monaco saw Buemi in the points in tenth, ahead of Nico Rosberg whilst Alguersuari crashed out along with Vitaly Petrov in an incident that brought out the red flag to the race. In Canada, Alguersuari finished eighth, helped out by the retirements of Adrian Sutil, Nick Heidfeld and Paul di Resta. Buemi also finished in tenth for the team's first double score since the 2009 Australian Grand Prix when Buemi was seventh ahead of Sébastien Bourdais.

In the British Grand Prix, Alguersuari scored a point with a tenth-place finish while Buemi collided with di Resta, which forced his retirement from the race. Neither driver finished in the points in Germany, but both drivers picked up points in Hungary; Buemi came from 23rd on the grid to finish eighth while Alguersuari added another point to his tally with tenth place. At the Belgian Grand Prix, Alguersuari qualified sixth, but retired on the first lap after contact with Bruno Senna. Buemi also retired after contact with Sergio Pérez. Both drivers picked up points at Monza, with Alguersuari a career-best seventh and Buemi tenth. In Singapore, Buemi finished 12th and Alguersuari was classified 21st after crashing in the closing stages.

At the Japanese Grand Prix, Alguersuari finished in fifteenth position, while Buemi retired with a loose tyre. The Korean Grand Prix saw the team qualify in eleventh and thirteenth places. Due to their car's high straight-line speed, Buemi picked up points with ninth, while Alguersuari overtook Rosberg's Mercedes on the final lap to take the team's best race result in 2011, of seventh place. Alguersuari added an eighth place in India, while Buemi retired. In Abu Dhabi, Alguersuari again finished down in fifteenth; meanwhile Buemi had his third retirement in four races. Both drivers finished outside the points at the season-ending Brazilian Grand Prix in eleventh and twelfth places.

==== 2012 ====
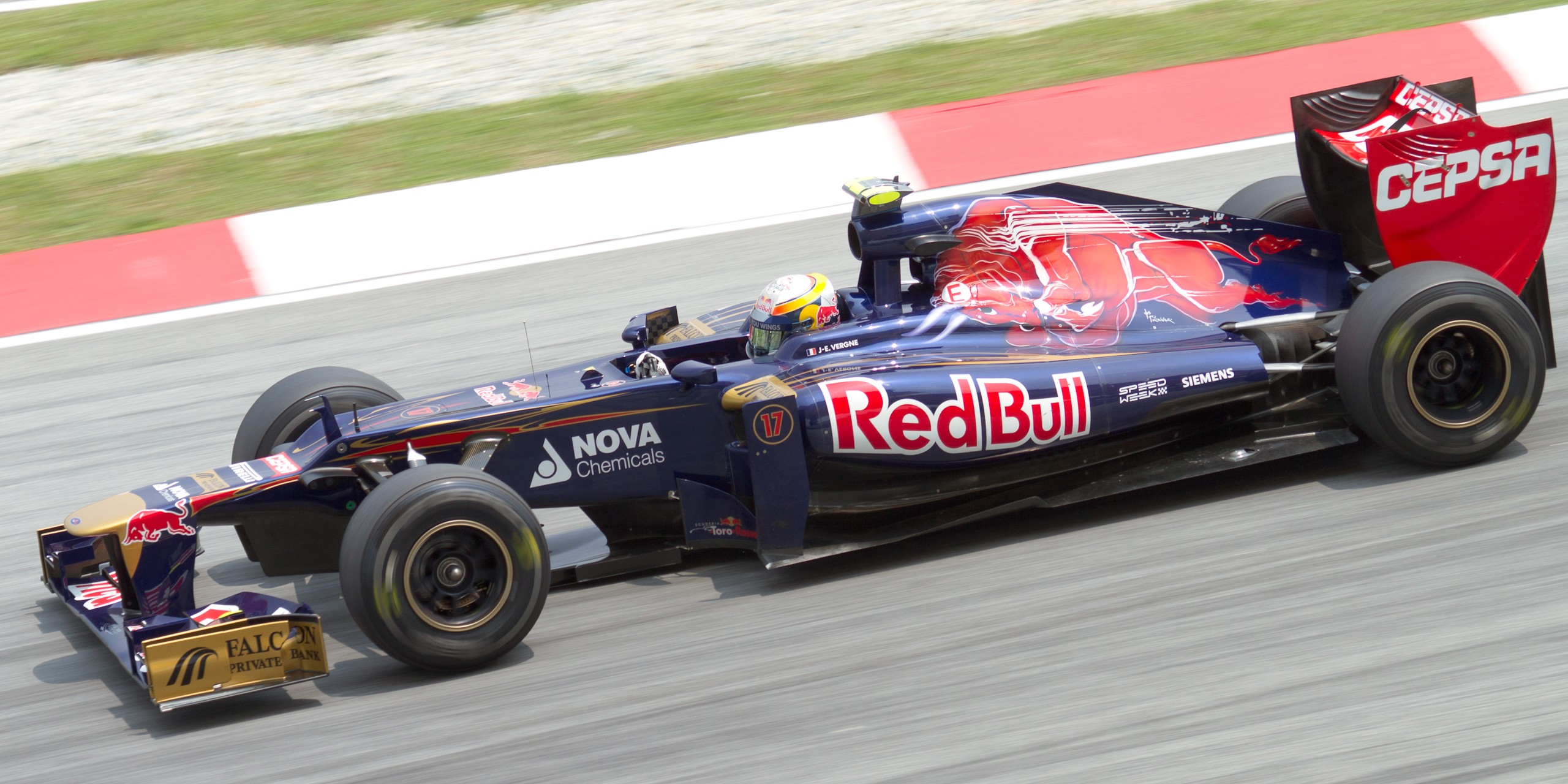
Jean-Éric Vergne scored his first points for the team at the 2012 Malaysian Grand Prix, just like his teammate, Daniel Ricciardo had done at the previous race, in Australia.

On 14 December 2011, it was announced that Daniel Ricciardo and Jean-Éric Vergne would drive for the team in 2012, replacing Sébastien Buemi and Jaime Alguersuari. Team principal Franz Tost later stated that the team had the make-up of a "rookie training school", with the prospect of bringing new talent to the team. After scoring points in the opening two rounds, Toro Rosso could not manage to maintain that pace and failed to finish in the points until the 12th race of the season, the Belgian Grand Prix.

On 6 September 2012, it was announced that James Key had joined the team as Technical Director, replacing Giorgio Ascanelli.

Despite some better results in the final races, Toro Rosso suffered a poor season which saw the team finish in ninth place in the Constructors' Championship, only ahead of Caterham, Marussia and HRT.

==== 2013 ====
On 31 October 2012, it was confirmed that Toro Rosso would retain its drivers Daniel Ricciardo and Jean-Éric Vergne for the 2013 season.

The team did not make the start they wanted at the Australian Grand Prix after Vergne finished 12th and Ricciardo retired due to an exhaust problem. However, at the Malaysian Grand Prix, Vergne managed to score the team's first point of the season with a respectable 10th place, while Ricciardo retired in 18th due to another exhaust problem. At the Chinese Grand Prix however, Ricciardo's fortunes turned around as he managed to finish in a career best 7th place while Vergne could only finish 12th. At the Bahrain Grand Prix, Vergne suffered a puncture and had to retire from the race and Ricciardo finished 16th and ultimately a lap down. In Spain, Ricciardo managed to score another point via a 10th place but still a lap down while Vergne collided and ultimately had to retire from the race. In Monaco, fortunes turned around for Vergne as he managed to finish an impressive 8th and score 4 points while Ricciardo, like his teammate in Spain, suffered a collision and had to retire from the race.

The Canadian Grand Prix saw the team take their best qualifying result since the 2011 Chinese Grand Prix, with Vergne qualifying seventh and Ricciardo tenth on the grid in wet conditions. Vergne finished the race in sixth place picking up 8 points, Toro Rosso's best result since the 2008 Brazilian Grand Prix.

Red Bull driver Mark Webber announced he was to retire from Formula One at the end of the season, leaving a vacant seat at Toro Rosso's sister team. Both drivers were in the hunt for a drive with the most dominant team in Formula One at the time. At the next race in Britain, Daniel Ricciardo qualified 5th place on the grid, which he converted into an 8th-place finish in the race. Vergne retired after suffering a puncture 35 laps in while running in the points. Ricciardo continued his form into Germany where he qualified 6th with teammate Vergne struggling in 16th. Ricciardo just missed out on points in 12th while Vergne retired on lap 22.

In Hungary both cars were out of the points and in qualifying for the 2013 Belgian Grand Prix, both cars went out in Q1, starting 18th and 19th—the team's worst qualifying performance of the year. However, Ricciardo bounced back to take 10th and looked set for a move to Red Bull in 2014. Vergne came 12th for the second race in a row.

Before the following race in Italy it was announced that Ricciardo would replace Webber at Red Bull for the 2014 season. Ricciardo impressed his future employers with a strong 7th position in qualifying while teammate Vergne started 10th with a mistake in Q3 ruining his chancing of improving on his previous time. In the race, Ricciardo picked up more points with 7th to take 13th place in the Drivers' Championship from Vergne who retired on lap 14.

=== Renault customer engines – first spell (2014–2015) ===
==== 2014 ====
Toro Rosso signed a long-term agreement with Renault to use their same-spec engines as it was used by Red Bull Racing, Lotus and Caterham teams from 2014. Unlike its sister team that usually received engines free of charge due to full-works partner basis, Toro Rosso's engine supply deal with Renault was on a customer basis, paying for its engines with a lease as well as limited factory support. On 21 October 2013, it was announced that Jean-Éric Vergne would remain with the team for a third successive season, and will be partnered by Daniil Kvyat, who was a race-winner in the GP3 Series and the FIA European Formula 3 Championship in 2013.

The team made an impressive start at the Australian Grand Prix with Vergne qualifying 6th, Toro Rosso's best qualifying result since the 2013 British Grand Prix and Kvyat qualifying 8th. The drivers finished the race 8th and 9th respectively to score Toro Rosso's first points of the season, and his result, Kvyat had broken Sebastian Vettel's record as the youngest points scorer in Formula One history. At the Malaysian Grand Prix, Vergne qualified 9th while Kvyat qualified 11th. The race was going well for them until on lap 18, Vergne suffered a power unit failure in his car, which has been a common occurrence in Renault powered cars at that point in the season. Meanwhile, Kvyat finished 10th and scored 1 point but was ultimately a lap down from the race winner.

At the Bahrain Grand Prix, both Vergne and Kvyat qualified well down the field in 13th and 14th; Kvyat finished 11th while Vergne retired due to a collision. At the next race in China, Vergne qualified 9th and Kvyat 13th, but Kvyat was able to score a point in 10th place. At the Spanish Grand Prix, Kvyat once again qualified 13th while Vergne started 16th. Kvyat finished 14th, a lap down from the race winner while Vergne retired from the race due to an exhaust problem. At the Monaco Grand Prix, both cars qualified in the top ten, as Vergne was seventh while Kvyat qualified in ninth. However, with exhaust ailments inflicting both cars, neither driver was able to finish the race. At the Canadian Grand Prix, Vergne started 8th while Kvyat qualified in 15th; Vergne finished where he started, while Kvyat retired due to a driveshaft failure.

At the Austrian Grand Prix, Kvyat took his best qualifying position with 7th, while Vergne lined up from 15th position. The team suffered another double retirement, as Vergne retired due to an issue with his brakes, while Kvyat was sidelined with a suspension problem. At the British Grand Prix, both cars once again qualified in the top ten, with Kvyat ninth and Vergne tenth. For the first time since Australia, both drivers scored points, as both Kvyat and Vergne finished precisely where they started. At the German Grand Prix, Kvyat qualified eighth, five places ahead of his teammate. Vergne finished the race in 13th, while Kvyat retired from the race, after his car caught fire. At the Hungarian Grand Prix, Vergne qualified 8th and Kvyat qualified 11th, with Vergne picking up 2 points for 9th position. Kvyat finished 14th, a lap down from race winner Daniel Ricciardo.

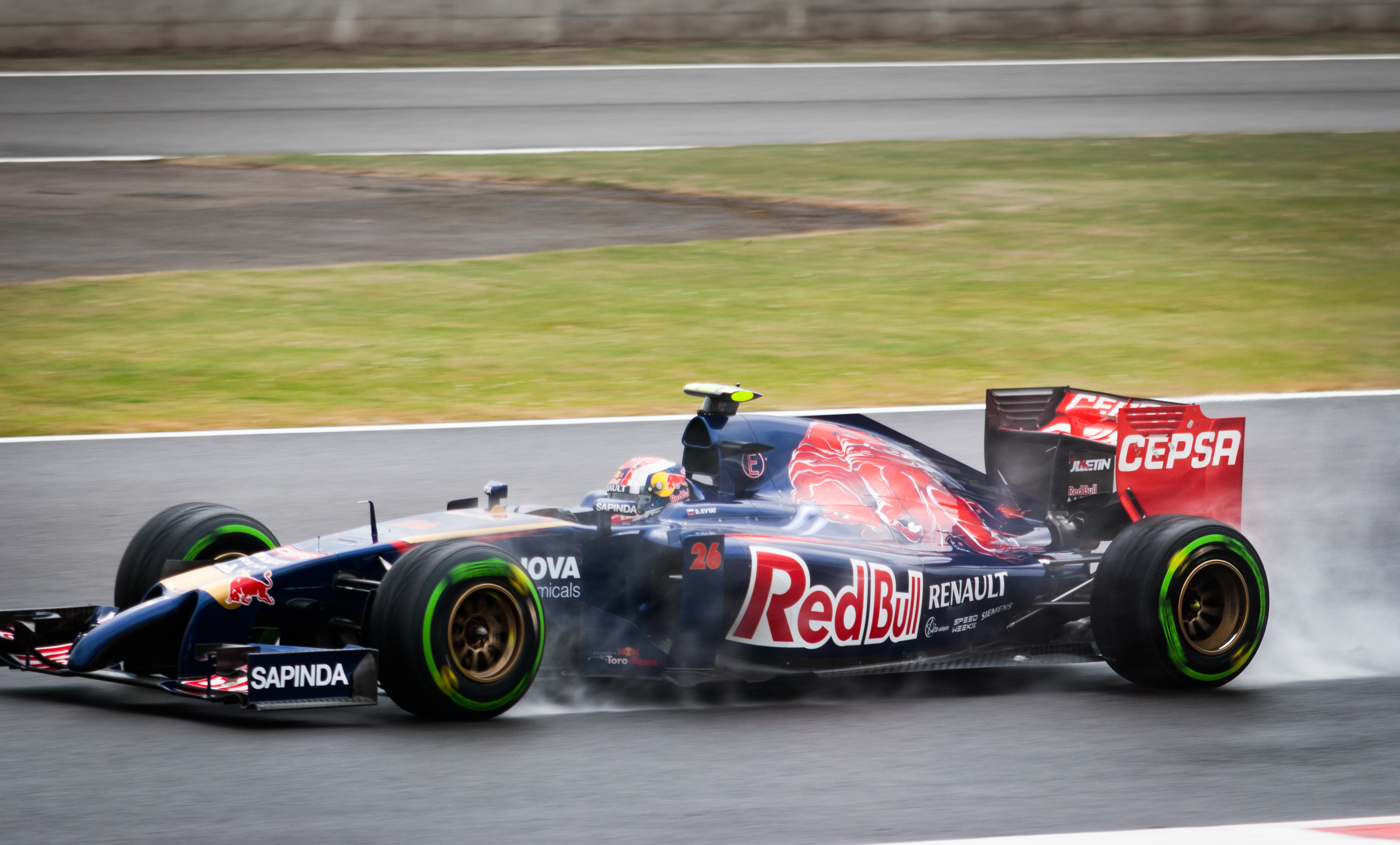
Daniil Kvyat at the 2014 British Grand Prix

One week prior to the Belgian Grand Prix, Toro Rosso announced the signing of then 16-year-old Max Verstappen to replace Vergne at the conclusion of the 2014 season to be partnered with Kvyat – meaning that Vergne would be without a seat with the team. In Belgium, Kvyat qualified 11th and Vergne qualified 12th, with Kvyat collecting 2 points after finishing 9th, while Vergne just missed out on the final points position, in 11th. At the team's home race in Italy, Kvyat once again outqualified Vergne, starting 11th to Vergne's 13th. Both drivers finished the race in the same position in which they started. At the Singapore Grand Prix, Kvyat lined up 10th while Vergne was 12th. Despite receiving a 5-second penalty for exceeding track limits, Vergne finished the race in 6th place, Kvyat finished in 14th place. At the Japanese Grand Prix, Vergne outqualified Kvyat as they started 11th and 13th respectively, and Vergne scored more points with a 9th-place finish, while Kvyat was just outside the points in 11th. Just before this race, Red Bull announced that Sebastian Vettel would leave their team at the conclusion of the season, and that Kvyat would be promoted to the senior team – giving Vergne a renewed chance to fight for his seat with Toro Rosso for the remainder of the season. Among the candidates being considered for the second seat were Vergne, as well as Red Bull Junior Team drivers Carlos Sainz Jr. and Pierre Gasly – who finished first and second in the Formula Renault 3.5 Series – and Alex Lynn, the GP3 Series champion.

Fortunes improved significantly for Kvyat as he qualified 5th for his home race in Russia, while Vergne qualified 10th. Both drivers finished outside the points, with Vergne 13th and Kvyat 14th. At the United States Grand Prix, Kvyat qualified 14th and Vergne was just behind in 15th. In the race, Vergne finished 10th while Kvyat finished a lap down, in 15th. At the penultimate race of the season in Brazil, Kvyat qualified 14th while Vergne was 16th; neither car finished in the points, with Kvyat 11th and Vergne 13th and both drivers were a lap down. At the final race of the season in Abu Dhabi, Kvyat matched his best qualifying position with 5th place, while Vergne was in 10th. Again, both cars failed to finish in the points; Kvyat retired due to a power unit failure while Vergne finished 12th. In 2014, Toro Rosso scored 30 points; Vergne scored 22 points while Kvyat scored 8.

==== 2015 ====
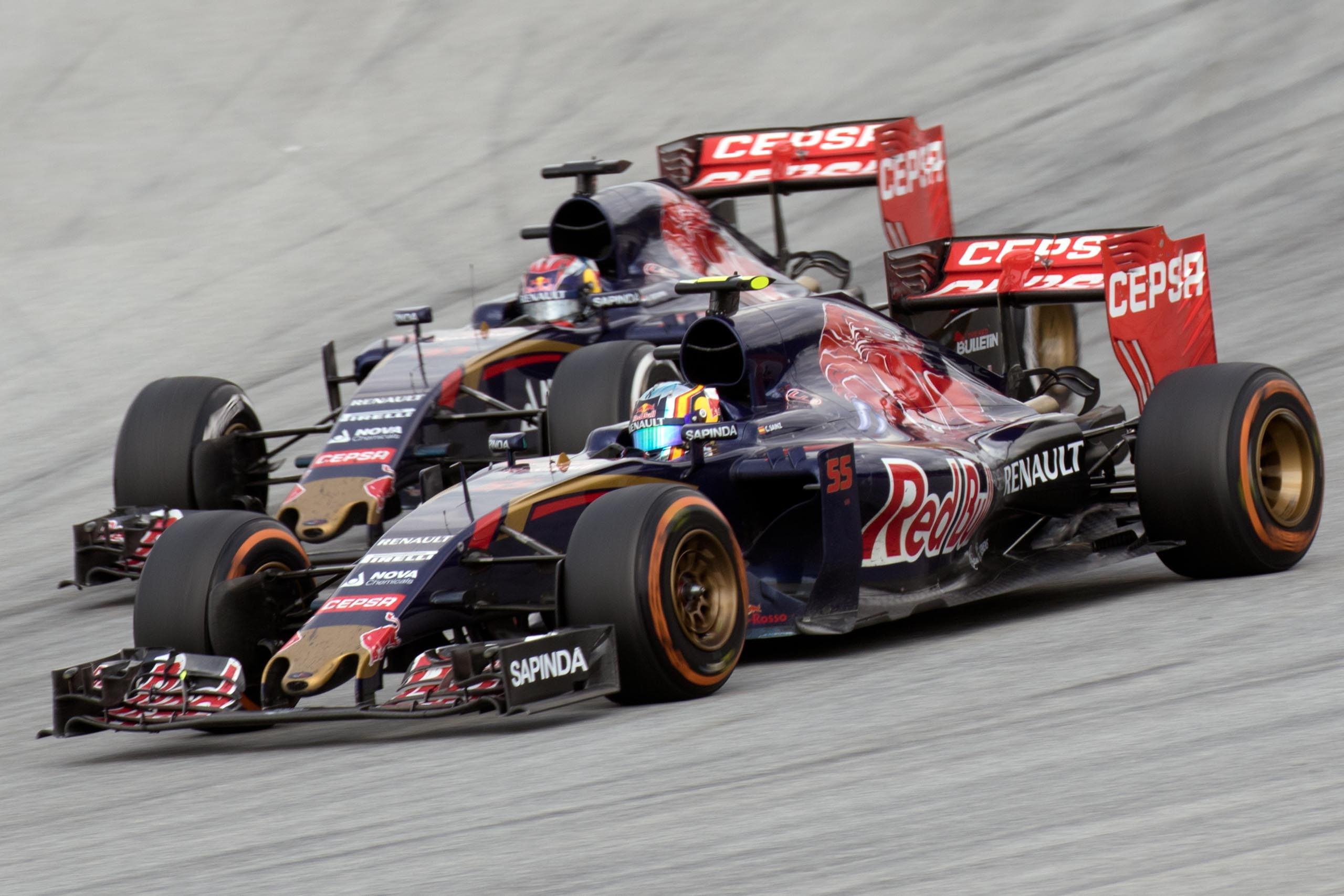
The two Toro Rossos of Carlos Sainz Jr. and Max Verstappen at the 2015 Malaysian Grand Prix

On 26 November 2014, Jean-Éric Vergne announced he would be leaving Toro Rosso after 3 seasons, and two days later, Toro Rosso confirmed that Carlos Sainz Jr. would partner Max Verstappen for the 2015 season.

At the Australian Grand Prix, Sainz qualified 8th while his teammate Max Verstappen qualified 12th. Sainz finished ninth and collected two points on his début while Verstappen retired due to his car suffering an engine failure.

During the 2015 season, Toro Rosso enjoyed unexpected success on the grid; the break-out of Max Verstappen combined with many points finishes along with two 4th places, both by Verstappen, ensured that Toro Rosso enjoyed their most successful season in Formula One based on points. Verstappen scored 49 points while his teammate Carlos Sainz Jr managed to score 18 points.

=== Ferrari customer engines – second spell (2016) ===
==== 2016 ====
At the end of the 2015 season, after the Abu Dhabi Grand Prix, it was announced that Toro Rosso would be reviving their customer partnership with Ferrari for the 2016 season, The only difference this time was that Toro Rosso would be provided with 2015 power units, as opposed to up-to-date 2016 power units used in previous seasons but without any direct factory support from Ferrari despite the partnership. Toro Rosso used Ferrari engines from 2007 through 2013 during the V8 normally-aspirated era. On 4 January 2016 it was announced that Toro Rosso would adopt a longer wheelbase for the all-new STR11 car due to the Ferrari 060 power unit and gearbox requiring a spacer to accommodate the MGU-K at the rear of the engine (similar to the Marussia MR03 which had a longer wheelbase: about 3,700 millimetres (150 in)). After a controversial crash in Russia, Kvyat was brought back to Toro Rosso from Red Bull, with Max Verstappen taking his place.

=== Renault customer engines – second spell (2017) ===
==== 2017 ====
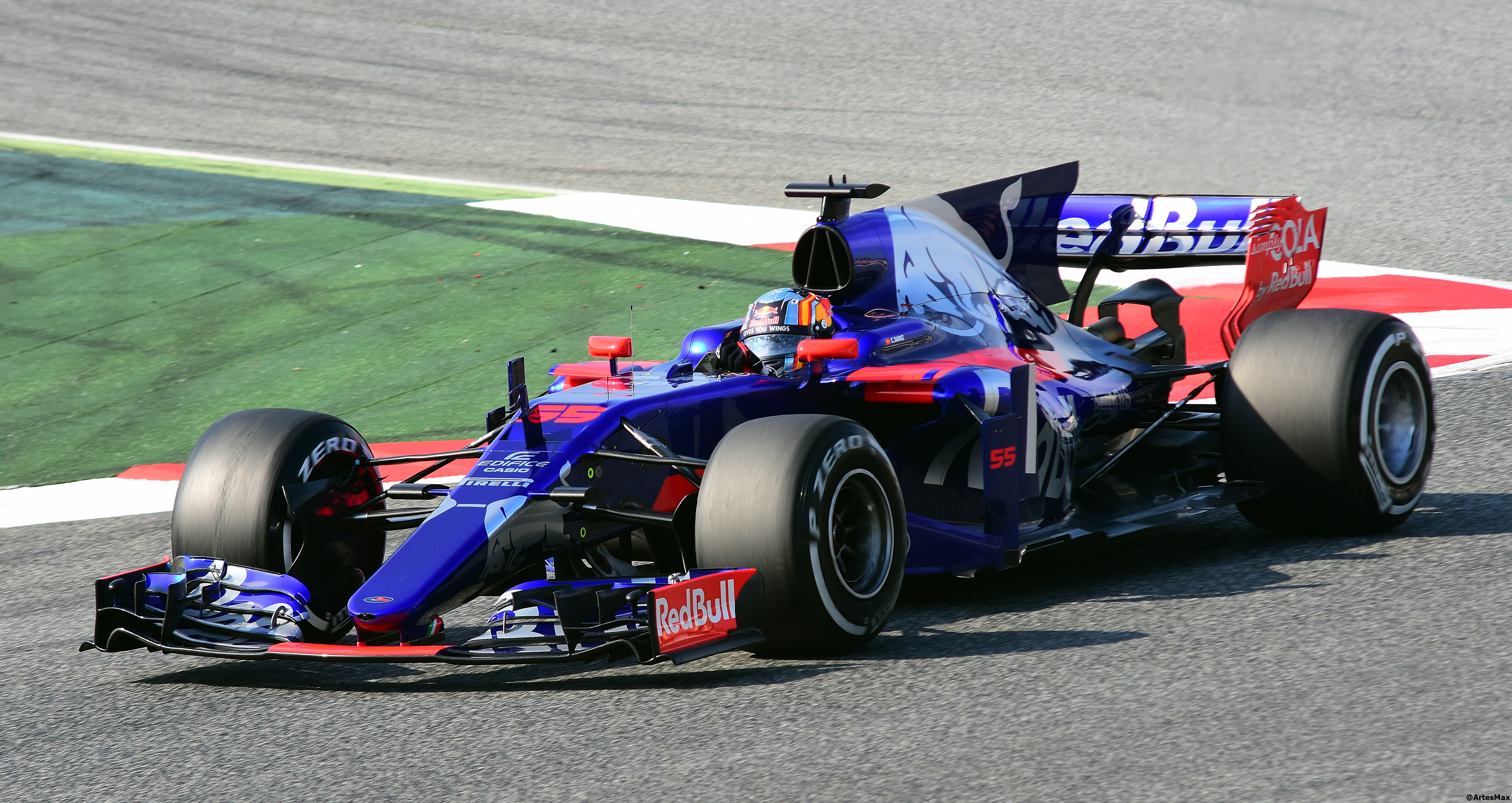
Carlos Sainz Jr. at the 2017 pre-season test

During the 2016 Monaco Grand Prix, it was announced that Scuderia Toro Rosso would be rekindling their customer engine partnership with Renault for 2017. The team retained Sainz and Kvyat as their drivers. Despite the Renault partnership, the team opted to utilize Toro Rosso branding on its engine and thus no factory support.

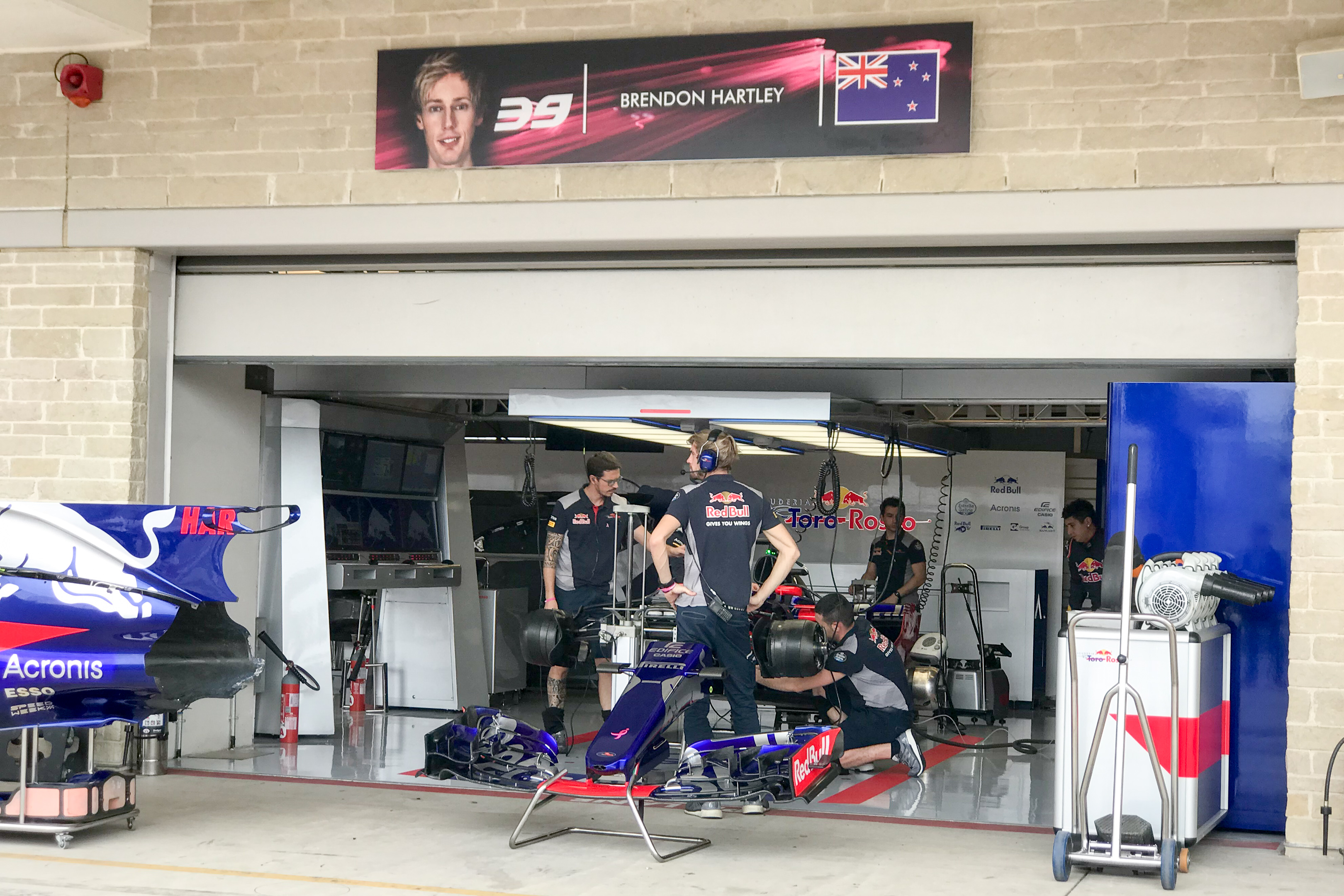
Scuderia Toro Rosso Pitbox of Brendon Hartley in United States, 2017. Hartley replaced Gasly after the latter vacated his seat for the weekend to race in Super Formula.

On 26 September 2017, it was announced that Pierre Gasly would replace Kvyat for an unspecified number of races, beginning with the Malaysian Grand Prix. At the United States Grand Prix, Sainz moved to Renault for the remaining rounds of the season, ahead of his previously announced move for 2018, with Kvyat returning to the team. Gasly was absent in order to participate in the final round of the Japanese Super Formula Championship, so Brendon Hartley replaced him for this race. After the race, it was announced that Gasly would return to partner Hartley for the Mexican Grand Prix. After the 2017 Mexican Grand Prix, Helmut Marko said that Daniil Kvyat would not be returning to Toro Rosso and that the team would race with Brendon Hartley and Pierre Gasly for the remainder of the season.

=== Honda works engines (2018–2019) ===
==== 2018 ====
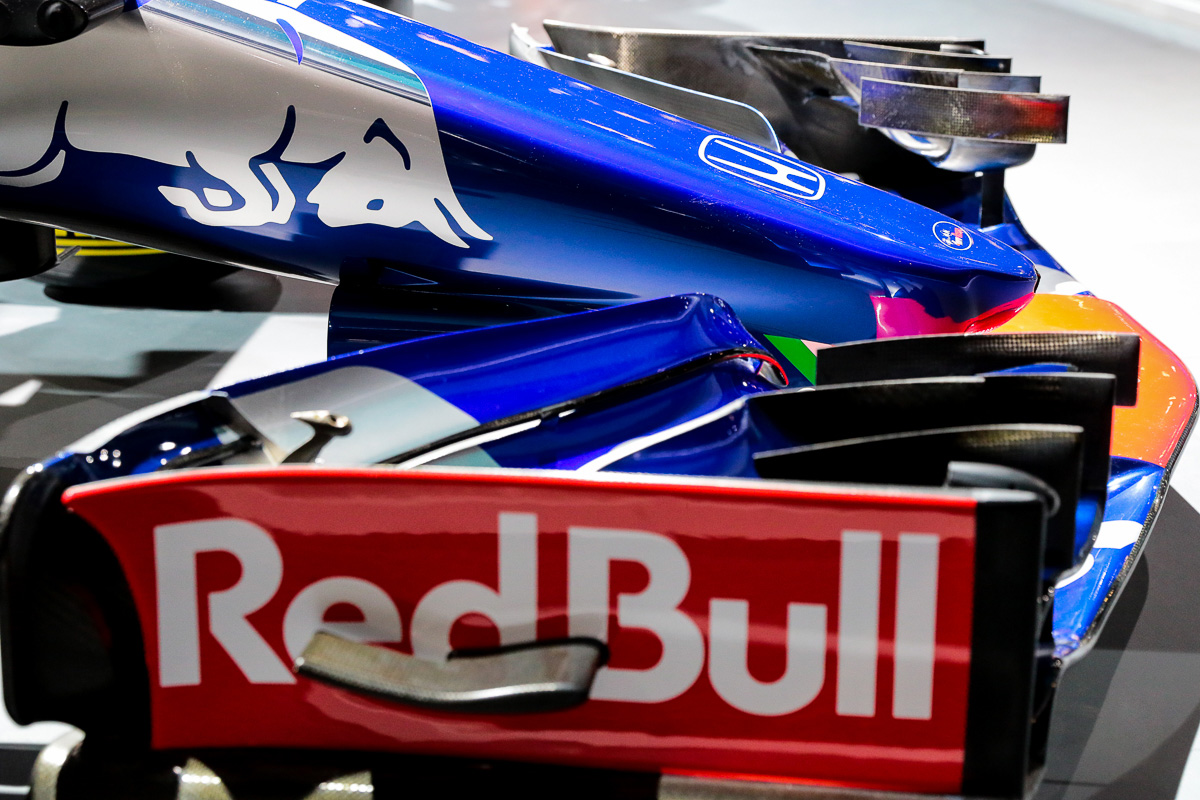
A spare front wing for the STR13 pictured at the 2018 Singapore Grand Prix

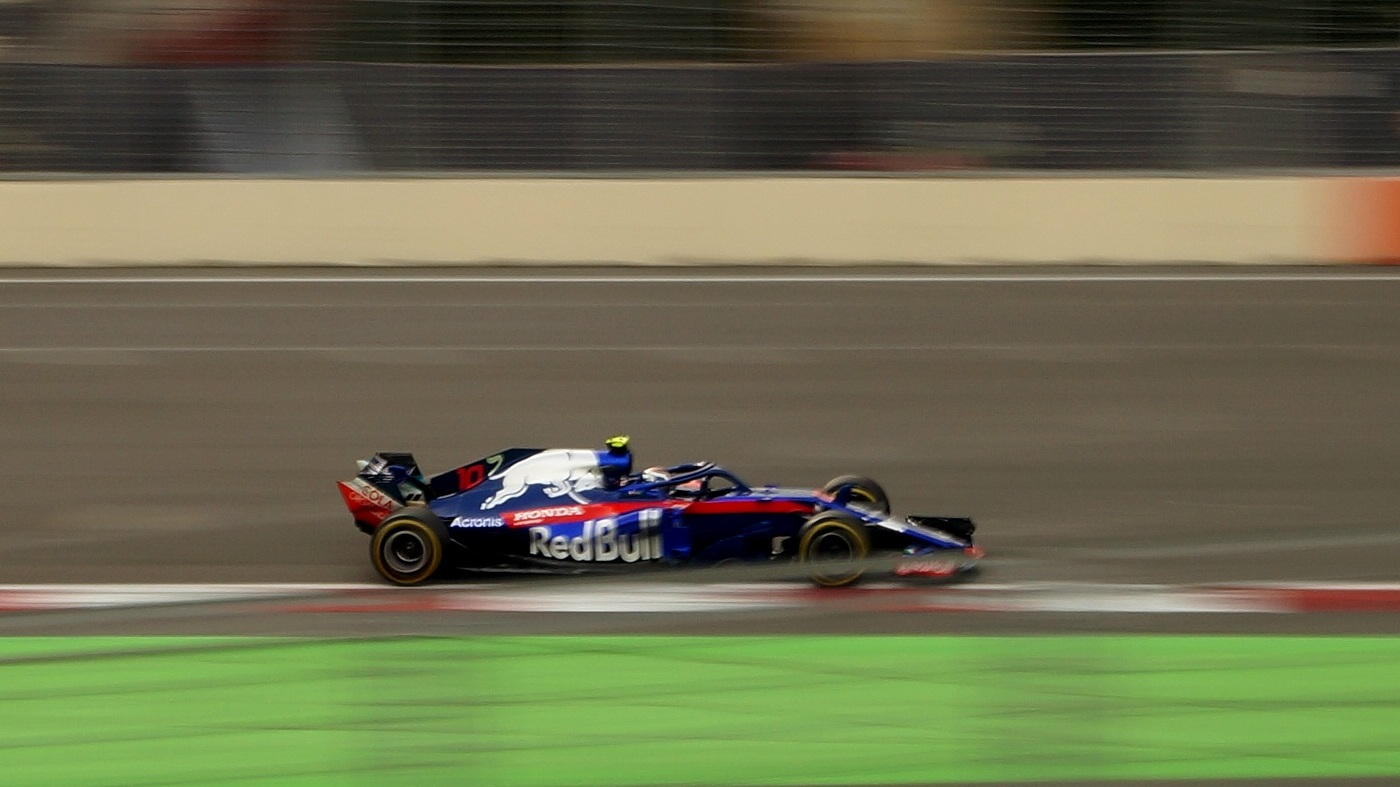
Toro Rosso STR13 of Pierre Gasly

On 15 September 2017, it was announced that Toro Rosso would terminate Renault's remaining contract of customer engine partnership in order to sign the full-works Honda power unit partnership contract for 2018 onwards, after Honda had severed its ties with McLaren. Thus, Toro Rosso earned direct factory support from Honda as a flagship team that included free engines for the first time in team's history. In addition, the Toro Rosso-Honda partnership also included Japanese Honda staff who would work at their Faenza base as well as official team vehicles and brand endorsements. On the following day, the team confirmed that they would retain their final 2017 driver line-up into 2018, with Pierre Gasly and Brendon Hartley. During pre-season testing, many were surprised at the speed and reliability of the Honda engine, which had gained a poor reputation during the past three years with McLaren. However, the first race in Australia was unspectacular, with Gasly retiring with an engine failure after qualifying in last place and Hartley finishing 15th. The following race in Bahrain would be far more successful, with Gasly starting 5th and finishing 4th in what would eventually become the team's best result of the season, albeit with Hartley suffering an incident-strewn race and being classified 17th.

Numerous reliability issues and poor luck plagued the team throughout the year, particularly for Hartley. He suffered a gearbox failure in China, the same race in which he and Gasly crashed at the hairpin on Lap 30, but scored his first point in Formula One with 10th place in Azerbaijan. Gasly was eliminated by a heavy first-lap collision with Romain Grosjean in Spain, but finished a respectable 7th at the following race in Monaco whilst Hartley retired after Charles Leclerc collided into his rear after a brake failure. Hartley retired again in Canada when he was forced into a wall on the first lap by Lance Stroll. Gasly was again eliminated in a collision on the opening lap at his home race in France. Two consecutive retirements for Hartley followed, a hydraulics failure in Austria and a power unit failure in Britain. He finished 10th in Germany, ending a four-race streak in which the team failed to score points. Two points finishes followed for Gasly, an impressive 6th place in Hungary and 9th place in Belgium. Hartley retired from the race in Italy after a first-lap collision, before both drivers suffered brake failures in Russia, coincidentally at almost exactly the same time. Both drivers impressed in Japan, qualifying in 6th and 7th, but both would finish outside the points. Two more points finishes came before the end of the season, 9th place for Hartley in the United States—the best result of his career—and 10th place for Gasly in Mexico.

The team finished the season in 9th place in the championship with 33 points, 29 for Gasly and four for Hartley.

==== 2019 ====
With Honda expanding its partnership to the senior Red Bull Racing team from 2019 onwards, Scuderia Toro Rosso was also confirmed to continue its full-works partnership with Honda for the long term until at least the 2020 season. Pierre Gasly was promoted to Red Bull for 2019. His replacement at Toro Rosso was Daniil Kvyat—re-hired by the team after he was previously dropped in 2017. Brendon Hartley was replaced by 2018 Formula 2 third-place finisher Alexander Albon. Kvyat finished 10th at the opening race in Australia, keeping Red Bull's newly promoted Gasly behind him for much of the race. Albon scored his first Formula One points with a 9th place in Bahrain, before finishing 10th in China after starting from the pit lane. Kvyat suffered consecutive collision-related retirements in China and in Azerbaijan. Toro Rosso recorded a double points-finish in Monaco, the first time the team had done so in over two years since the 2017 Spanish Grand Prix. The team scored an excellent result at the rain-affected German Grand Prix, where clever strategy calls allowed Kvyat and Albon to finish 3rd and 6th respectively. This was Toro Rosso's first podium finish since their shock win at the 2008 Italian Grand Prix, and their best ever race result in terms of total points.

Prior to the Belgian Grand Prix, Albon left the team after being promoted to Red Bull, replacing Gasly who returned to Toro Rosso. A number of consistent points-finishes followed, as the STR14 demonstrated its ability to fight at the front of the midfield. This included 7th and 9th in Belgium and 7th and 10th in Japan. At the chaotic Brazilian Grand Prix, Toro Rosso claimed their third podium finish. Gasly took advantage of multiple incidents and held off Lewis Hamilton's Mercedes in a drag race to the finish line to finish 2nd. In the final race, Danill Kvyat finished ninth to give the team their 500th point.

Over the course of 2019, Toro Rosso only suffered a single reliability-related retirement, Kvyat's oil leak in Italy. This is in stark contrast to 2018, with seven such retirements. This consistency was rewarded as the team ended the season in 6th place in the championship with 85 points, their best ever points haul in the team's history.

For the 2020 season, Toro Rosso officially rebranded into the Scuderia AlphaTauri team, to promote parent company RedBull's fashion label, AlphaTauri.

== Sponsorship ==
Sports sponsorship is a major part of Red Bull's marketing strategy, and Scuderia Toro Rosso is not the first sports team to be bought and completely re-branded: it has done the same for Red Bull Racing (formerly Jaguar Racing), the Austrian football club Red Bull Salzburg (formerly SV Austria Salzburg), German football club RB Leipzig (previously SSV Markranstädt), Austrian ice hockey team Red Bull Salzburg EC and MLS' Red Bull New York (previously Metrostars).

On 6 September 2011, the week before the Italian Grand Prix, the team confirmed that they had received a sizeable investment from Spanish petroleum group Cepsa (only sponsorship but not as de facto direct fuel and lubricant supplier) which ended after the 2015 season.

Between 2016 and 2019, Toro Rosso had an agreement with the Japanese watch manufacturer Casio (through its Edifice brand). In the 2019 season, the team secured Thai-based sponsors Moose Craft Cider and PTT Lubricants (only sponsorship but not de facto lubricant supplier) due to Alexander Albon's factor.

== Racing record ==
Year	Name	Car	Engine	Tyres	No.	Drivers	Points	WCC
2006	(Italy) Scuderia Toro Rosso	STR1	Cosworth TJ2005 3.0 V10	M	20. 21.	(Italy) Vitantonio Liuzzi (United States) Scott Speed	1	9th
2007	(Italy) Scuderia Toro Rosso	STR2	Ferrari 056 2006 2.4 V8	B	18. 19. 19.	(Italy) Vitantonio Liuzzi (United States) Scott Speed (Germany) Sebastian Vettel	8	7th
2008	(Italy) Scuderia Toro Rosso	STR2B; STR3	Ferrari 056 2007 2.4 V8	B	14. 15.	(France) Sébastien Bourdais (Germany) Sebastian Vettel	39	6th
2009	(Italy) Scuderia Toro Rosso	STR4	Ferrari 056 2008 2.4 V8	B	11. 11. 12.	(France) Sébastien Bourdais (Spain) Jaime Alguersuari (Switzerland) Sébastien Buemi	8	10th
2010	(Italy) Scuderia Toro Rosso	STR5	Ferrari 056 2009 2.4 V8	B	16. 17.	(Switzerland) Sébastien Buemi (Spain) Jaime Alguersuari	13	9th
2011	(Italy) Scuderia Toro Rosso	STR6	Ferrari 056 2010 2.4 V8	P	18. 19.	(Switzerland) Sébastien Buemi (Spain) Jaime Alguersuari	41	8th
2012	(Italy) Scuderia Toro Rosso	STR7	Ferrari 056 2011 2.4 V8	P	16. 17.	(Australia) Daniel Ricciardo (France) Jean-Éric Vergne	26	9th
2013	(Italy) Scuderia Toro Rosso	STR8	Ferrari 056 2012 2.4 V8	P	18. 19.	(France) Jean-Éric Vergne (Australia) Daniel Ricciardo	33	8th
2014	(Italy) Scuderia Toro Rosso	STR9	Renault Energy F1-2014 1.6 V6 t	P	25. 26.	(France) Jean-Éric Vergne (Russia) Daniil Kvyat	30	7th
2015	(Italy) Scuderia Toro Rosso	STR10	Renault Energy F1-2015 1.6 V6 t	P	33. 55.	(Netherlands) Max Verstappen (Spain) Carlos Sainz Jr.	67	7th
2016	(Italy) Scuderia Toro Rosso	STR11	Ferrari 060 1.6 V6 t	P	26. 33. 55.	(Russia) Daniil Kvyat (Netherlands) Max Verstappen (Spain) Carlos Sainz Jr.	63	7th
2017	(Italy) Scuderia Toro Rosso	STR12	Toro Rosso 1.6 V6 t	P	10. 26. 28. 55.	(France) Pierre Gasly (Russia) Daniil Kvyat (New Zealand) Brendon Hartley (Note: Brendon Hartley was assigned the number 39 for the 2017 United States Grand Prix before he selected a permanent race number.) (Spain) Carlos Sainz Jr.	53	7th
2018	(Italy) Red Bull Toro Rosso Honda	STR13	Honda RA618H 1.6 V6 t	P	10. 28.	(France) Pierre Gasly (New Zealand) Brendon Hartley	33	9th
2019	(Italy) Red Bull Toro Rosso Honda	STR14	Honda RA619H 1.6 V6 t	P	10. 23. 26.	(France) Pierre Gasly (Thailand) Alexander Albon (Russia) Daniil Kvyat	85	6th

For 2020 onwards, check the racing history of Scuderia AlphaTauri (2020-2023) and Racing Bulls (2024-)
