= Brendan Gilhome =

Australian engineer

- Citizenship: Australian
- Occupation: Aerodynamicist
- Employer: L2T
- Title: Managing director

Brendan Gilhome is an Australian Formula One and motorsport aerodynamicist. He is currently the managing director of Australian aerodynamics consultancy company L2T. He previously served as head of aerodynamics for Scuderia Toro Rosso.

== Career ==
Gilhome studied aerospace engineering at RMIT University, graduating with honours, before completing a PhD in aerodynamics at Monash University in 2002. Following his doctorate, Gilhome worked as a consulting aerodynamicist in Australia, contributing to a range of applied aerodynamics projects including wind-engineering studies on large structures, aero-acoustic measurement, and development of experimental data-processing tools. He later joined the Forschungsinstitut für Kraftfahrwesen und Fahrzeugmotoren Stuttgart (FKFS) in Germany, where he conducted experimental wind-tunnel and rolling-road testing programmes for automotive and motorsport clients across Europe.

Gilhome moved into Formula One with Sauber Motorsport in 2005 as an aerodynamicist, contributing to the aerodynamic development of the team’s cars. Following BMW’s acquisition of Sauber, he became Group Leader Aerodynamics, working closely with the concept group and technical leadership on the integration of aerodynamic architecture, cooling layouts, diffuser development and rear-end packaging. His group also advanced model-to-track correlation methods and introduced new flow-measurement techniques to accelerate development understanding.

In 2010 Gilhome joined the Mercedes Formula One Team as Principal Aerodynamicist. He led projects including the rear-end aerodynamic concept for the 2013 car and contributed to the early concept phase of the 2014 regulation-change car, while also overseeing in-season development and departmental technical coordination.

He moved to Scuderia Toro Rosso in 2013 as Head of Aerodynamics, leading the aerodynamic department through multiple seasons and overseeing wind-tunnel, CFD and track-correlation programmes at the team's aerodynamics centre at Bicester. He left the team in early 2018.

After leaving Formula One, Gilhome returned to Australia and became Managing Director of L2T, an engineering consultancy specialising in aerodynamics.
