= McLaren MP4-31 =

2016 Formula One racing car

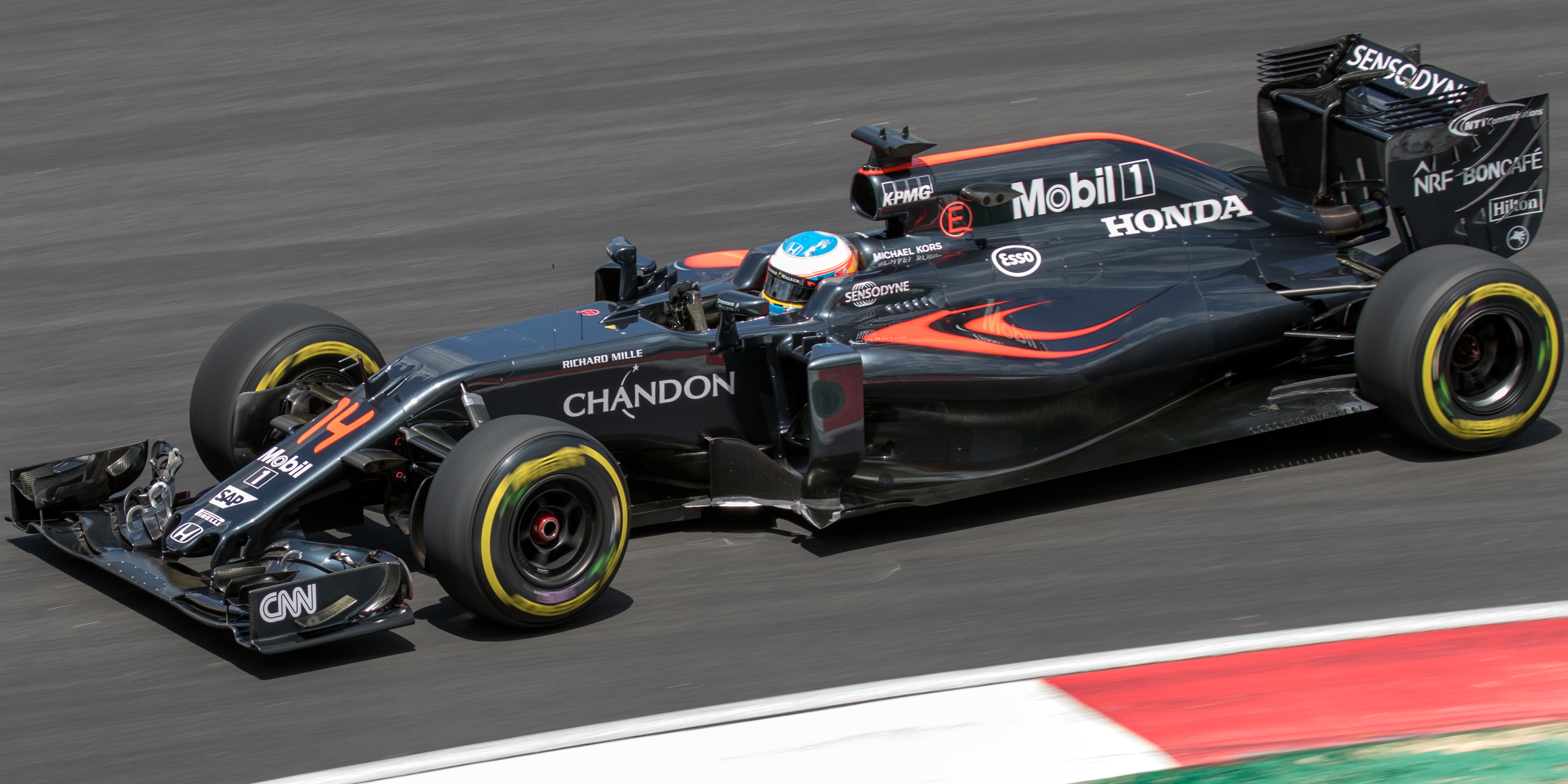
- The McLaren MP4-31, driven by Fernando Alonso, during the Malaysian Grand Prix
- Category: Formula One
- Constructor: McLaren
- Designers: Tim Goss (Chief Technical Officer); Matt Morris (Engineering Director); Peter Prodromou (Aerodynamics Director); Mark Ingham (Head of Vehicle Design); Guillaume Cattelani (Head of Aerodynamics); Barney Hassell (Chief Engineer - Performance); Peter Schroder (Chief Engineer - Systems); Yasuhisa Arai (Chief Technical Officer, Engine - Honda)
- Predecessor: McLaren MP4-30
- Successor: McLaren MCL32

Technical specifications
- Chassis: Carbon-fibre composite survival cell
- Suspension (front): Carbon-fibre wishbone, pushrod suspension elements with inboard torsion bars and damper system (KONI dampers, springs and shock absorbers)
- Suspension (rear): Carbon-fibre wishbone, pullrod suspension elements with inboard torsion bars and damper system (KONI dampers, springs and shock absorbers)
- Length: 5,070 mm (200 in)
- Width: 1,800 mm (71 in)
- Height: 950 mm (37 in)
- Wheelbase: 3,520 mm (139 in) with -/+25 mm (0.9843 in) adjustable by adjusting the toe depending on circuit layout
- Engine: Honda RA616H 1.6 L (98 cu in) direct injection (jointly developed and supplied by Honda and Hitachi) V6 turbocharged engine, limited to 15,000 rpm in a mid-mounted, rear-wheel drive layout
- Electric motor: Honda kinetic and thermal energy recovery systems
- Transmission: McLaren 8-speed + 1 reverse sequential seamless semi-automatic paddle shift with epicyclic differential and multi-plate limited slip clutch
- Battery: Honda lithium-ion batteries
- Weight: 702 kg (1,548 lb) including driver but excluding fuel
- Fuel: Esso Synergy and Mobil High Performance Unleaded (5.75% bio fuel)
- Lubricants: Mobil 1
- Brakes: Carbone Industrie brake-by-wire carbon discs and pads with Akebono steel calipers
- Tyres: Pirelli P Zero dry slick and Pirelli Cinturato treaded intermediate and wet tyres Enkei 13" magnesium racing wheels
- Clutch: AP Racing electro-hydraulically operated, carbon multi-plate

Competition history
- Notable entrants: McLaren Honda
- Notable drivers: 14. (Spain) Fernando Alonso; 22. (United Kingdom) Jenson Button; 47. (Belgium) Stoffel Vandoorne
- Debut: 2016 Australian Grand Prix
- Last event: 2016 Abu Dhabi Grand Prix
Races	Wins	Podiums	Poles	F/Laps
21	0	0	0	1

The McLaren MP4-31 is a Formula One racing car designed by McLaren to compete in the 2016 Formula One season. The car was driven by 2005 and 2006 World Drivers' Champion Fernando Alonso and 2009 World Champion Jenson Button, and reserve driver Stoffel Vandoorne, who replaced Alonso at the Bahrain Grand Prix following the Spaniard's accident at the Australian Grand Prix which deemed him unfit for the next event.

By the end of a 2015 season marred by reliability woes and the underperformance of the Honda engine, McLaren had shifted development of the MP4-30 to assist in development for the 2016 car. Despite suffering from reliability issues, the car was marked an improvement over the MP4-30, ultimately finishing in sixth in the Constructors' Championship (above 2015's ninth place finish). This was the final McLaren to use the "MP4" prefix following CEO Ron Dennis' departure from the team.

== Background and technical specifications ==
The car used the Honda RA616H power unit, the second engine developed by Honda since their return to the sport with McLaren in 2015.

This was the final McLaren car to use ExxonMobil fuel and lubricant since the transfer of ExxonMobil sponsorship to Red Bull Racing in 2017.

== Season review ==
After a generally much better pre-season in terms of reliability than the year before, the team headed to the Australian Grand Prix with progress made to the Honda power unit. McLaren showed progress with the car by qualifying 12th and 13th. However, the race was a disappointment as Alonso was involved in an accident with Haas's Esteban Gutiérrez which caused Alonso's car to barrel roll a few times before landing upside down. His car was totally wrecked and Alonso suffered from broken ribs and a collapsed lung, ruling him out of the next race in Bahrain. Button's race was badly affected because of this, as the red flag was shown after he had made a pit stop. With a few cars in front of him making a free change of tyres as a result of the red flag, Button struggled through to finish 14th.

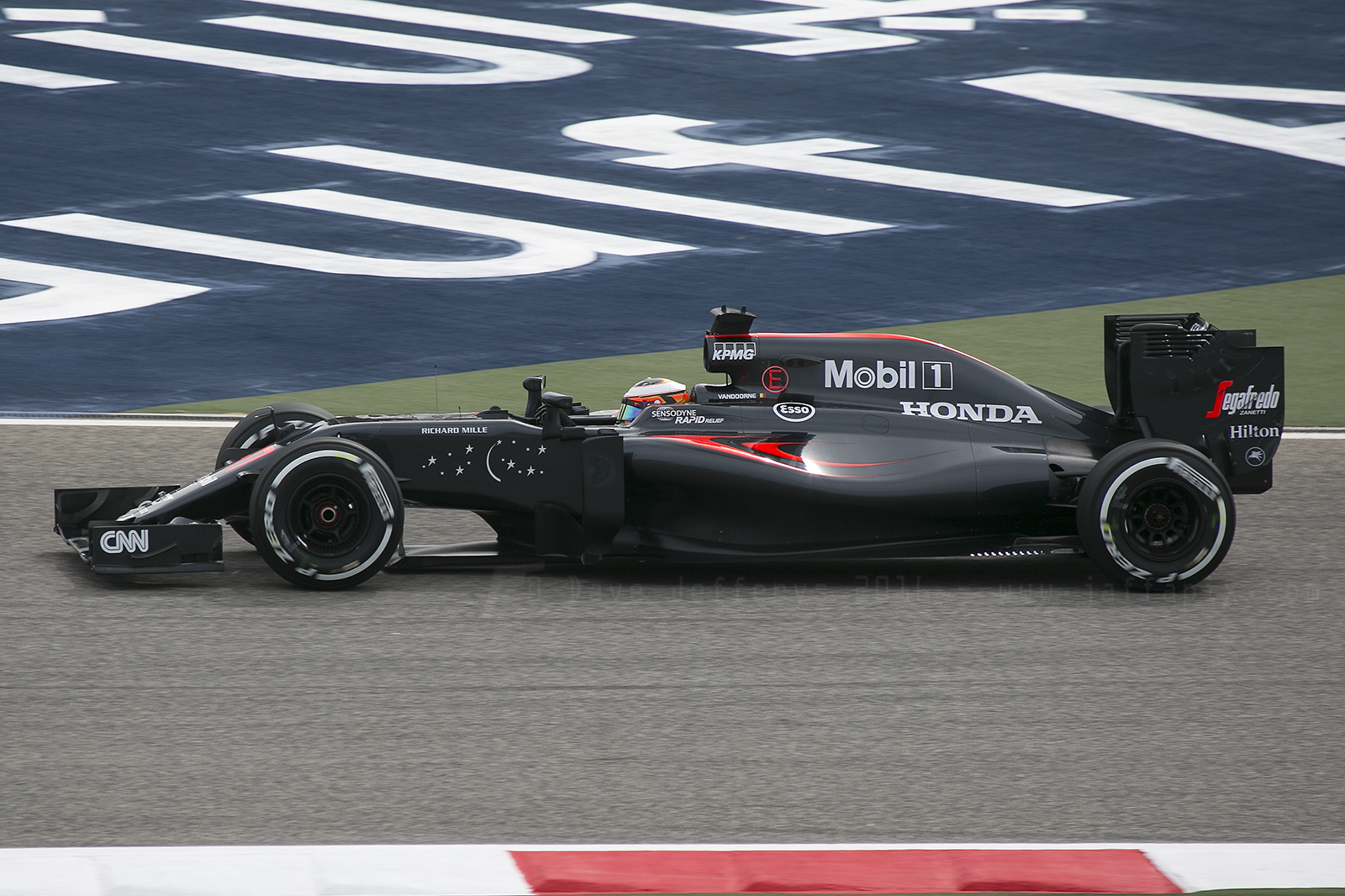
Reserve driver Vandoorne deputized for the injured Alonso at the Bahrain Grand Prix. He would go on to score his first F1 points during the race.

In Bahrain, the team fielded reserve driver Stoffel Vandoorne to replace the injured Alonso. Both cars once again made it to Q2 easily. During the race, Button was on course for a good result, however unreliability struck him once again, retiring after just eight laps with an engine problem. However, Vandoorne did have the honours of picking up McLaren's first point by finishing tenth, including a notable overtake on the Force India of former McLaren driver Sergio Pérez.

Alonso then returned for the Chinese Grand Prix. Both the cars once again comfortably made it into Q2, albeit not Q3 but then had an uninspiring race to get two cars to the finish line for the first time outside the points, despite Alonso at one time running third.

The Russian race saw both cars failing to make it into Q3, extending that barren run to 23 races. However, in a race of attrition, both cars benefited from turn one incidents to have a clean race, with both cars finishing well inside the points, just the second time since the renewed partnership between McLaren and Honda. Alonso finished in sixth place and Button in ninth.

The Spanish Grand Prix saw McLaren eventually making it into the top ten in qualifying for the first time since the 2014 Abu Dhabi Grand Prix, with Alonso in tenth. However, it was Button who claimed the points after Alonso retired.

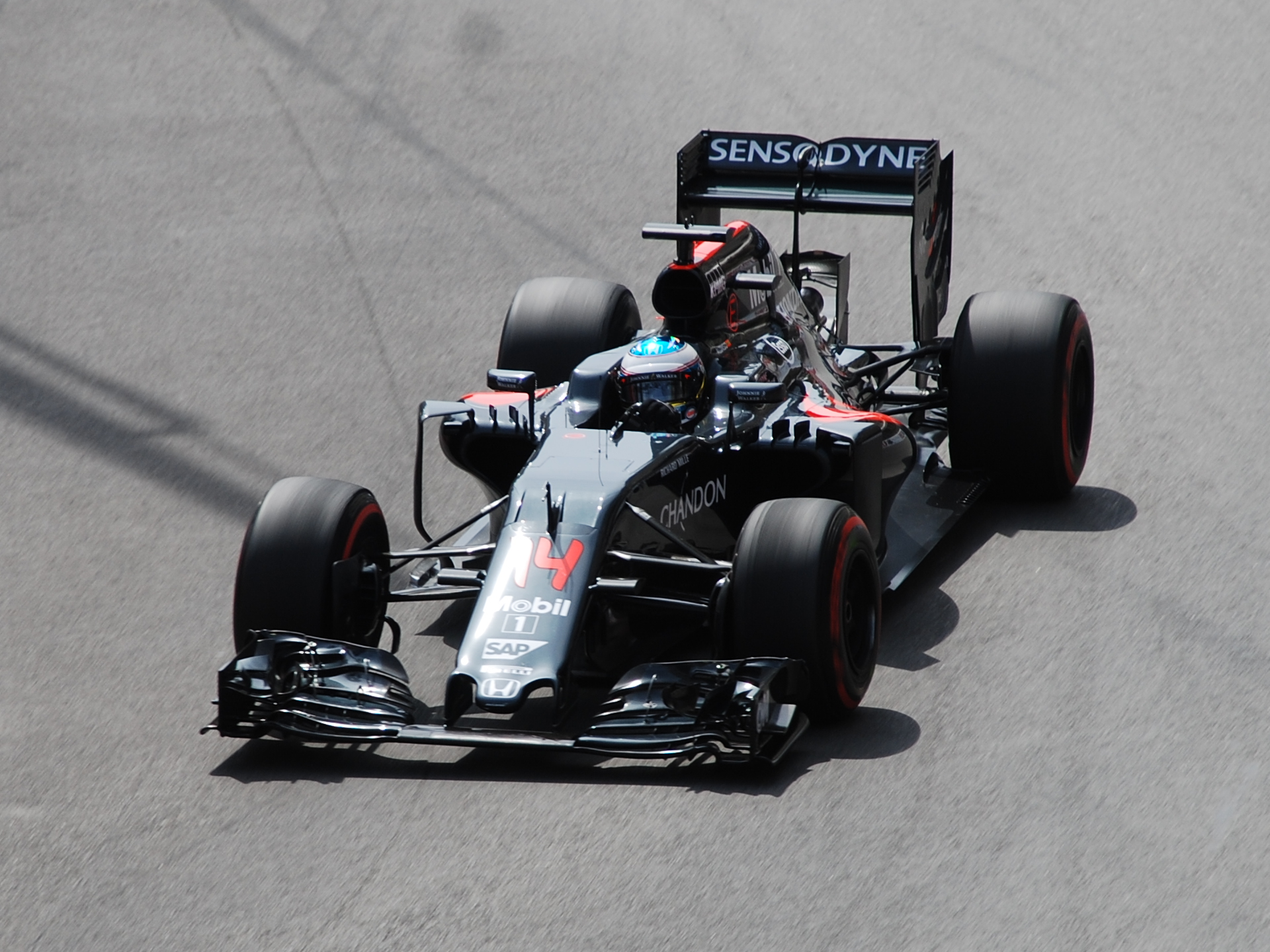
Alonso at the Monaco Grand Prix

The team once again had Alonso into Q3 at Monaco, albeit in another tenth place, but he rose to ninth after Kimi Räikkönen's five-place grid penalty for a gearbox change. Eventually, with good timings to pit for different sets of tyres in changeable conditions, Alonso managed to fend off Nico Rosberg in the much faster Mercedes to finish fifth, his joint best result since rejoining McLaren, and outscoring his points tally of last year. Button finished ninth, but felt that he could have finished higher had he not gotten stuck behind traffic.

In Canada, Alonso once again qualified 10th and Button 12th. The race however, was disappointing and branded as forgetful, as Button once again succumbed to early reliability woes by having an engine failure, and Alonso finished just outside the points in 11th, having lost time on pit-stops and also lack of pace with the car.

At the newly introduced Baku City Circuit, the cars showed good pace in the first free practice sessions but Alonso and Button qualified a disappointing 14th and 19th respectively. Both the cars failed to score points with Button recovering to finish 11th and Alonso retiring due to a gearbox problem.

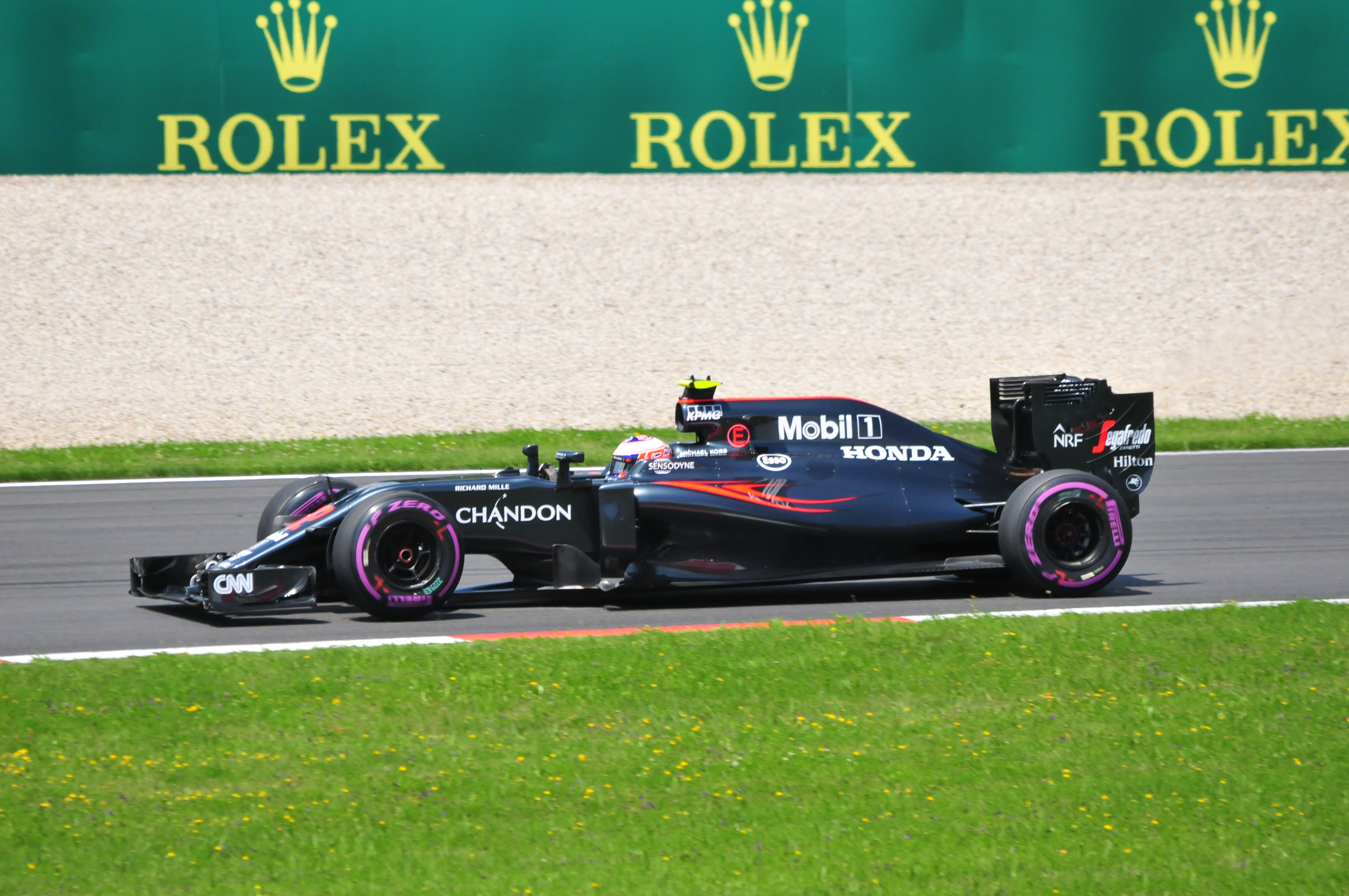
Button started from third on the Austrian Grand Prix and finished the race in sixth.

At the Red Bull Ring, Austria, the team was expected to struggle for performance due to the high speed nature of the track. But surprisingly, the car performed above everybody's expectations as Button qualified 5th and started in 3rd, equalling his best qualifying position since 2014 British Grand Prix where qualifying was also held in mixed conditions, due to Rosberg and Vettel receiving 5 place grid penalties. Alonso meanwhile struggled with the car and managed to qualify down in 14th, due to the team's error in sending him out in old tyres instead of the newer ones. During the race, Button managed to get into 2nd before the first corner, overtaking the slow starting Force India of Nico Hülkenberg. Button managed to finish in 6th place after faster cars such as Red Bulls and Ferraris overtook him and Alonso retiring from the race during the final couple of laps due to an energy storage battery failure. The team had then scored more points with less than half of the season completed compared to the previous season's tally of 27 points.

At Hungaroring, both cars made it into Q3 for the first time since Abu Dhabi in 2014, their last race with engines supplied by Mercedes, with Alonso qualifying 7th and Button qualifying 8th. In the first few laps of the race, Button experienced a problem with the brake pedal sensor which lead to a drop in pace, a pit stop, and then a penalty for illegal radio communications when discussing the problem. Button eventually retired with an oil leak on lap 60 after making some progress moving from the back of the field. Alonso had a stronger race, heading the front of the midfield. While not troubling the faster Mercedes, Red Bull, and Ferrari cars, Alonso was able to keep the Toro Rosso of Sainz a comfortable distance behind him and finished in 7th.

Hockenheimring featured the McLaren cars battling in the midfield for the lower point places. After some good midfield battles, both cars struggled towards the end with fuel saving. This led to Alonso dropping out of the points in the last few laps and finishing 12th. Button capitalised on Bottas slowing drastically at the end of the race (as a result of a two-stop strategy) to move into 8th on the final lap.

At Spa-Francorchamps, Honda introduced new engine upgrades claiming its true potential will not be seen until the Singapore Grand Prix. But they were surprised to see that it was showing good pace at a track where engine power matters the most. Button managed to qualify in 9th and Alonso had an engine failure and failed to set a time which relegated him to the back of the field alongside his former teammate Lewis Hamilton who was penalised with a 55 place grid penalty. At the start of the race, Button fell down the order due to the first turn mayhem caused by the spinning of Vettel's Ferrari. Button was hit at the back of his car by Pascal Wehrlein at Les Combes causing damage to the back of his car forcing him to retire. But Alonso who had started from the back made the most out of it as many drivers had to pit after lap 1 to repair the damage or to retire. On lap 6 Kevin Magnussen crashed heavily at Eau Rouge which caused the Safety Car to be deployed. Most of the drivers ahead of Alonso came in to pit for fresh tyres which elevated him to 4th. He managed to finish in 7th and get 6 points for the team which saw them overtake Toro Rosso in the Constructors' Championship.

However, in Monza, the team were not expected to be competitive due to the long straights. Both drivers were eliminated in Q2 and as expected finished outside the points, despite Alonso setting the first fastest lap for a Honda-powered car since Ayrton Senna did so in Portugal in 1992, and McLaren's first fastest lap since Sergio Pérez did in Malaysia in 2013. The team also confirmed that more upgrades to both car and engine will be introduced until the end of the season, despite the changes in technical regulations for 2017.

In Singapore, the team said that they could have been the fourth best team for that weekend. But the car struggled and Button qualified 13th after damaging his left-rear wheel from a tap with the wall but started 12th due to Pérez being issued a five place grid penalty. Alonso started the race in 9th. Button retired from the race on lap 43 due to brake issues caused by a start-line collision with Bottas whilst trying to avoid Hülkenberg, who crashed out. Alonso however had a steady race to finish in 7th place yet again.

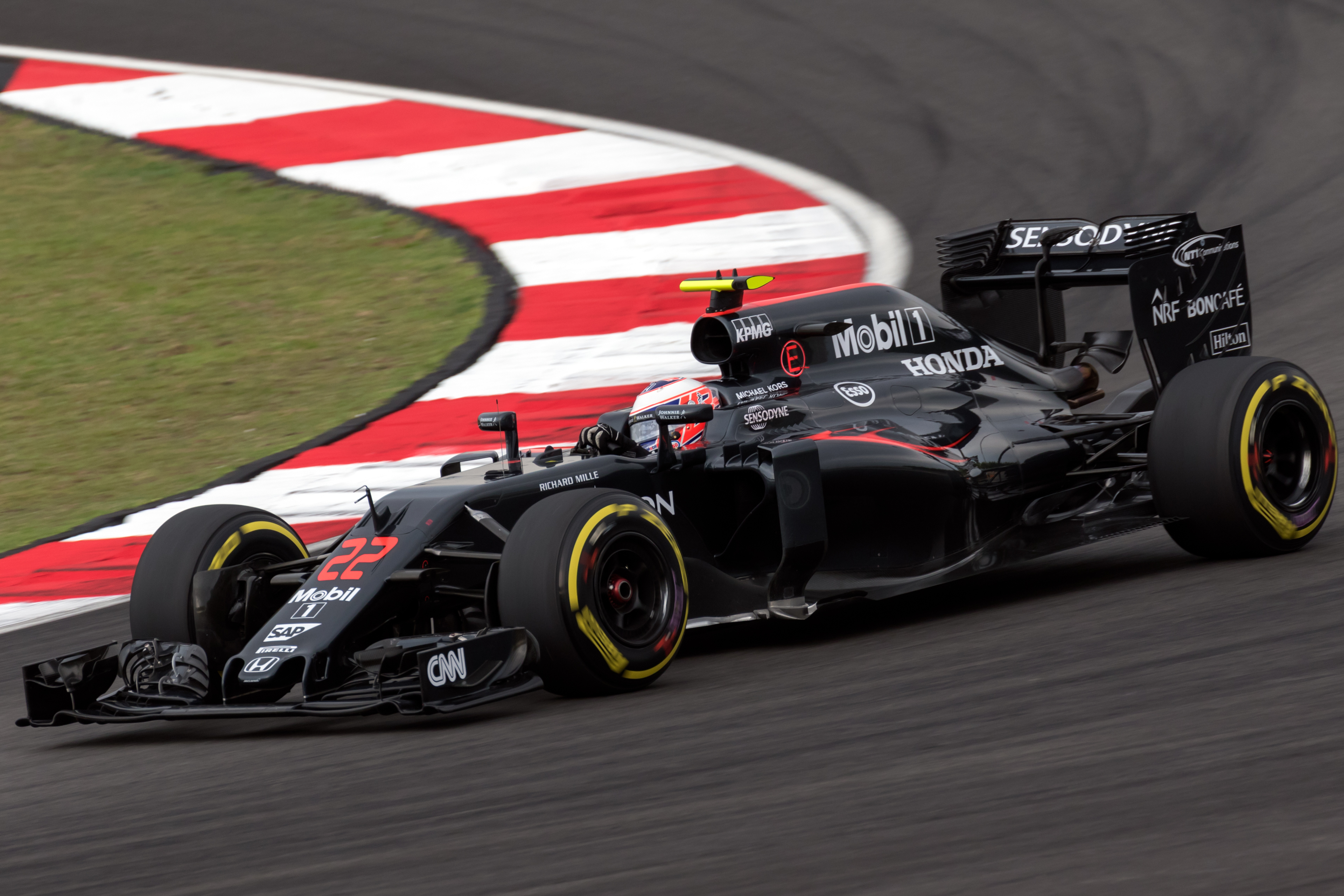
Button at the Malaysian Grand Prix

In Sepang, the team introduced an upgraded engine planned for Alonso to take the engine penalty which relegated him to last place in qualifying, while Button was expected to take the new engine and penalty in Austin. Button did made it to Q3, using an older spec engine all weekend with 9th. The car was competitive enough to deliver a double points finish for the 2nd time with Alonso using back the old engine to claw his way back to yet another 7th-place finish, while Button stayed in 9th. However a week later in Suzuka, Honda's home race, the team experienced their most difficult race of the season as the circuit characteristics were not suited to either the car or the engine, despite both drivers using the updated engine for the race, resulting in McLaren being outpaced by the likes of Haas, Renault, and even Sauber. Button failed to even make it to Q2, while Alonso qualified just 15th, with Button electing to take the new engine and penalty intended for Austin, for strategic reasons due to the car's lack of competitiveness for that race, and started last. With no retirements from the race for the 2nd consecutive year, both Alonso and Button could only manage 16th and 18th place, their worst finishing positions (excluding retirements) of 2016 so far.

In Austin, Button was surprisingly knocked out in Q1 since he could not find clear track and was delayed by Jolyon Palmer's Renault on the final corner which caught him off-guard, while Alonso was knocked out in Q2 and managed to qualify 12th, despite the car seemingly returning to competitiveness. McLaren nonetheless still delivered a 4th double points finish of the season, with Alonso benefiting from a Virtual Safety Car to make a free pit-stop and therefore matched his best finish of 5th since rejoining McLaren and for 2016, after late overtakes on both Massa and Sainz, despite colliding with Massa which caused Massa to suffer a puncture. Button again finished 9th, after a great 1st lap which saw him rise from 19th to 11th. The weekend was pretty encouraging for McLaren as they had endured difficult times at their engine supplier's home race in Japan, only for them to slip outside the points again in Mexico with 12th and 13th place for Button and Alonso respectively.

At São Paulo, Alonso made it to Q3 in 10th while Button struggled with balance issues of his car and was eliminated in Q1 in 17th. During the rain-soaked race, Alonso finished 10th after recovering from a spin to overtake 7 cars from 17th while Button again struggled with the balance and wound up in 16th place and last. Finally, in Abu Dhabi, Alonso once again made it to Q3 in 9th, while Button qualified 12th in what was possibly Button's last race in F1. During the race, Button unfortunately retired due to breaking the right-front suspension whilst bouncing the kerbs, while Alonso again finished 10th. The team rounded off the season 6th in the Constructor's Championship, a marked improvement compared to 2015 where it finished 9th. The team also finished with 76 points, compared to just 27 in 2015.

== Complete Formula One results ==
(key) (results in bold indicate pole position; results in italics indicate fastest lap)

Year	Entrant	Engine	Tyres	Drivers	Grands Prix																					Points	WCC
Year	Entrant	Engine	Tyres	Drivers	AUS	BHR	CHN	RUS	ESP	MON	CAN	EUR	AUT	GBR	HUN	GER	BEL	ITA	SIN	MAL	JPN	USA	MEX	BRA	ABU	Points	WCC
2016	McLaren	Honda RA616H	**P**																								
2016	McLaren	Honda RA616H	**P**	Fernando Alonso	Ret		12	6	Ret	5	11	Ret	18†	13	7	12	7	14	7	7	16	5	13	10	10	**76**	**6th**
2016	McLaren	Honda RA616H	**P**	Jenson Button	14	Ret	13	10	9	9	Ret	11	6	12	Ret	8	Ret	12	Ret	9	18	9	12	16	Ret	**76**	**6th**
2016	McLaren	Honda RA616H	**P**	Stoffel Vandoorne		10																				**76**	**6th**

† Driver failed to finish the race, but was classified as they had completed greater than 90% of the race distance.
