= McLaren MP4-29 =

Formula One racing car for 2014 season

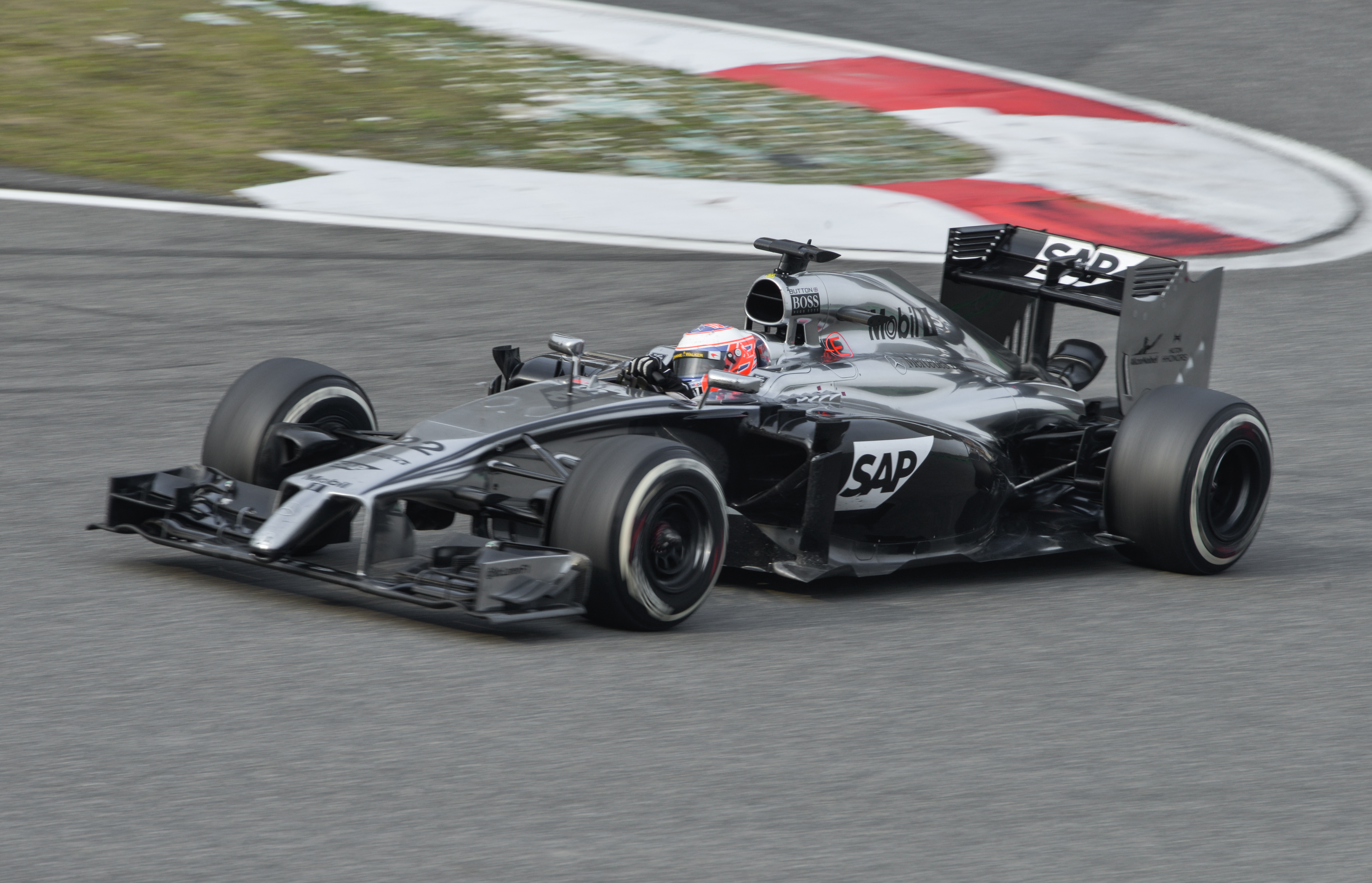
- Jenson Button driving the MP4-29 at the Chinese Grand Prix
- Category: Formula One
- Constructor: McLaren
- Designers: Neil Oatley (Executive Engineer); Tim Goss (Technical Director); Matt Morris (Engineering Director); Mark Williams (Head of Vehicle Engineering); Mark Ingham (Head of Vehicle Design); Sam Purvis (Project Leader); Marcin Budkowski (Head of Aerodynamics); Doug McKiernan (Chief Aerodynamicist)
- Predecessor: McLaren MP4-28
- Successor: McLaren MP4-30

Technical specifications
- Chassis: Carbon-fibre composite incorporating driver cockpit controls and fuel cell
- Suspension (front): Carbon-fibre wishbone and pushrod suspension elements operating inboard torsion bar and damper system
- Suspension (rear): Carbon-fibre wishbone and pull-rod suspension elements operating inboard torsion bar and damper system
- Length: 5,100 mm (201 in)
- Width: 1,800 mm (71 in)
- Height: 950 mm (37 in)
- Wheelbase: 3,460 mm (136 in) adjustable -/+20 mm (0.7874 in)
- Engine: Mercedes PU106A Hybrid Turbo 1.6 L (98 cu in) V6 (90°), 15,000 RPM limited , in a rear mid-mounted, rear-wheel drive layout
- Electric motor: Mercedes PU106A Hybrid Motor Generator Unit–Kinetic (MGU-K) Mercedes PU106A Hybrid Motor Generator Unit–Heat (MGU-H)
- Transmission: McLaren 8-speed + 1 reverse sequential seamless semi-automatic paddle shift with epicyclic differential and multi-plate limited-slip clutch
- Weight: 691 kg (1,523.4 lb) (with driver)
- Fuel: Exxon and Mobil High Performance Unleaded (5.75% bio fuel)
- Lubricants: Mobil 1
- Tyres: Pirelli P Zero dry slick and Pirelli Cinturato treaded intermediate and wet tyres
- Clutch: AP Racing electro-hydraulically operated, carbon multi-plate

Competition history
- Notable entrants: McLaren Mercedes
- Notable drivers: 20. (Denmark) Kevin Magnussen; 22. (United Kingdom) Jenson Button
- Debut: 2014 Australian Grand Prix
- Last event: 2014 Abu Dhabi Grand Prix
Races	Wins	Podiums	Poles	F/Laps
19	0	2	0	0

The McLaren MP4-29 was a Formula One racing car designed and built by McLaren to compete in the 2014 Formula One season. The chassis was designed by Tim Goss, Neil Oatley, Matt Morris, Mark Ingham and Marcin Budkowski and was powered by a customer Mercedes-Benz powertrain. The car was unveiled on 24 January 2014, and was driven by 2009 World Drivers' Champion Jenson Button and debutant Kevin Magnussen, who replaced Sergio Pérez, after he won the 2013 Formula Renault 3.5 Series title.

The MP4-29 was the most mechanically reliable car of the season with 36 classified finishes out of a possible 38. This was the last McLaren car to lead the World Constructors' Championship until the MCL38 in 2024.

== Background ==
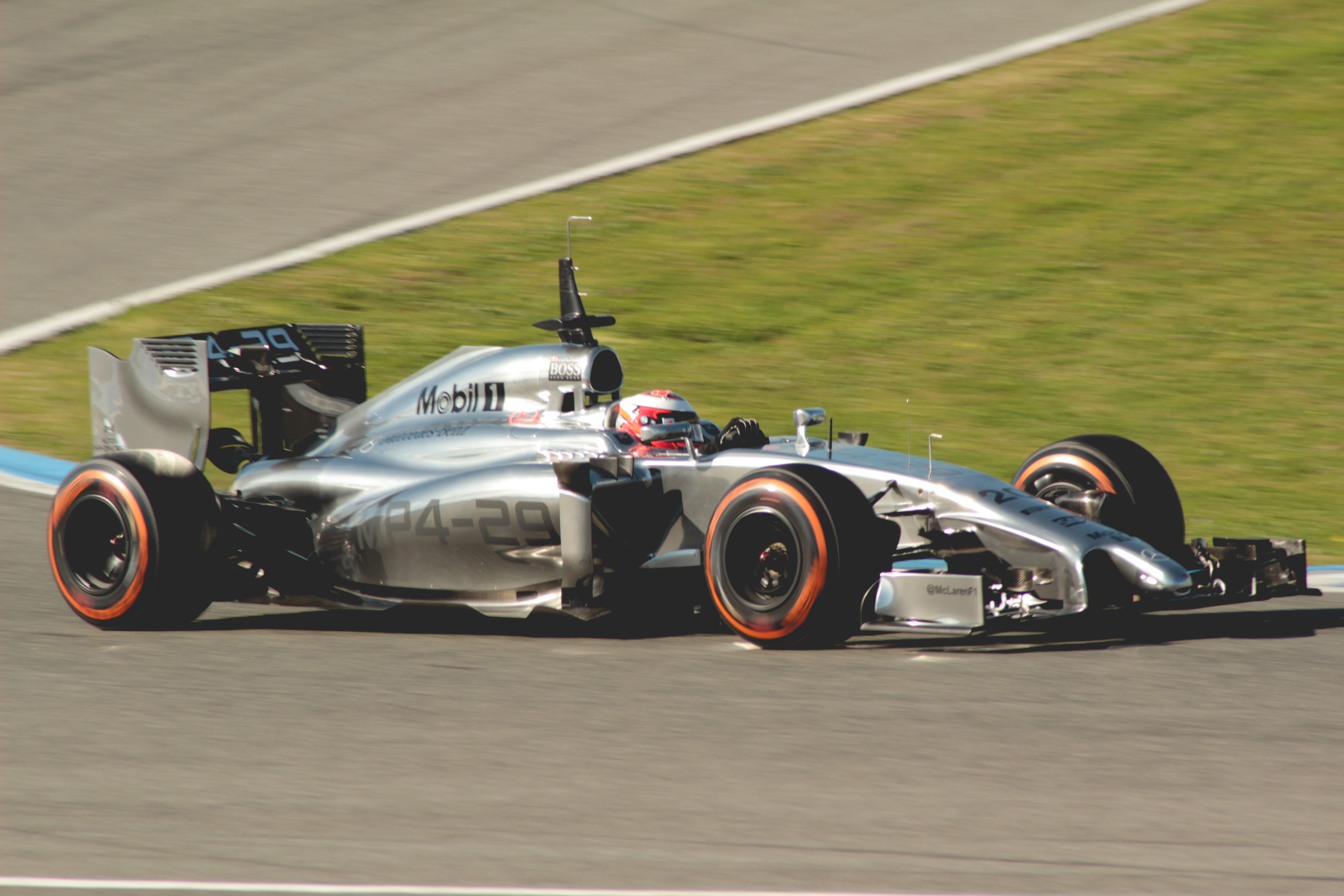
Kevin Magnussen driving the MP4-29 during the pre-season testing, showing the MP4-29 in its original livery

The MP4-29 was designed to use Mercedes' new 1.6-litre V6 turbocharged engine, the PU106A Hybrid.

The MP4-29 was McLaren's first turbo-powered Formula One car since the Honda engined MP4/4 which powered Ayrton Senna and Alain Prost to 15 wins and 15 pole positions from 16 races in 1988. This was the last McLaren model that was powered by a Mercedes-Benz engine until the MCL35M in 2021, due to the team switching to Honda in 2015. It was also the last Mercedes-powered F1 car to use ExxonMobil fuel to foster Mercedes' partnership with Petronas.

It is the first Formula One car to use the Esso brand since 2009, which applied in some places for the 2014 season and applied fully from 2015 along with Exxon and Mobil in selected locations before switched to Red Bull Racing in 2017.

== Season summary ==
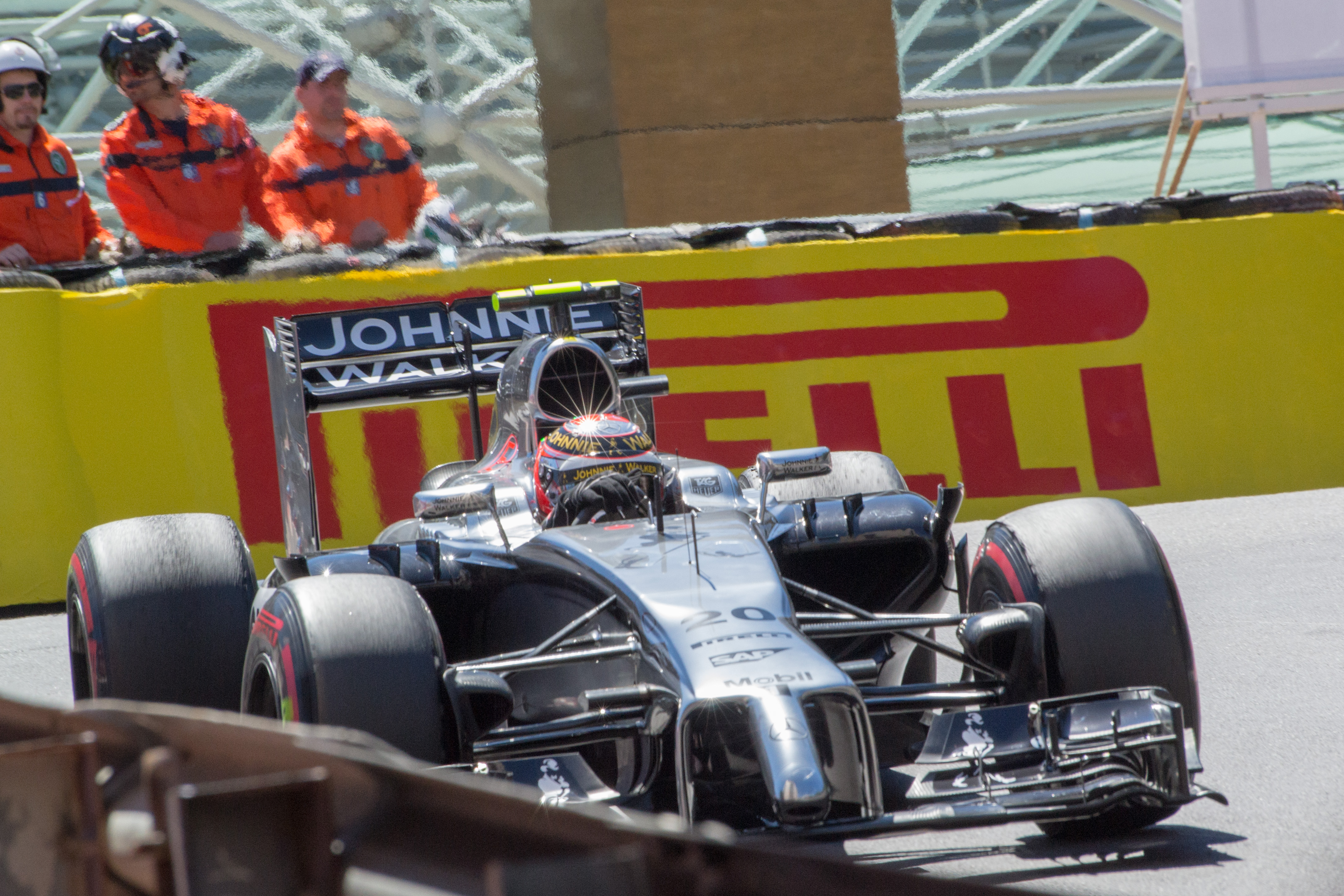
Magnussen at the Monaco Grand Prix

At the Australian Grand Prix, Kevin Magnussen and Jenson Button finished third and fourth on the road, respectively, but were elevated to second and third after Daniel Ricciardo's disqualification. This was McLaren's last podium until the 2019 Brazilian Grand Prix. The cars sported a Mobil 1 livery to honour the team's 20-year association with the brand.

The promising result from Australia was followed by disappointing performances. In the Malaysian Grand Prix, Button could only manage sixth and Magnussen in ninth. Both cars were unable to complete the Bahrain Grand Prix due to issues with the clutch during the race. This marks the first time McLaren suffered a double DNF since the 2006 United States Grand Prix.

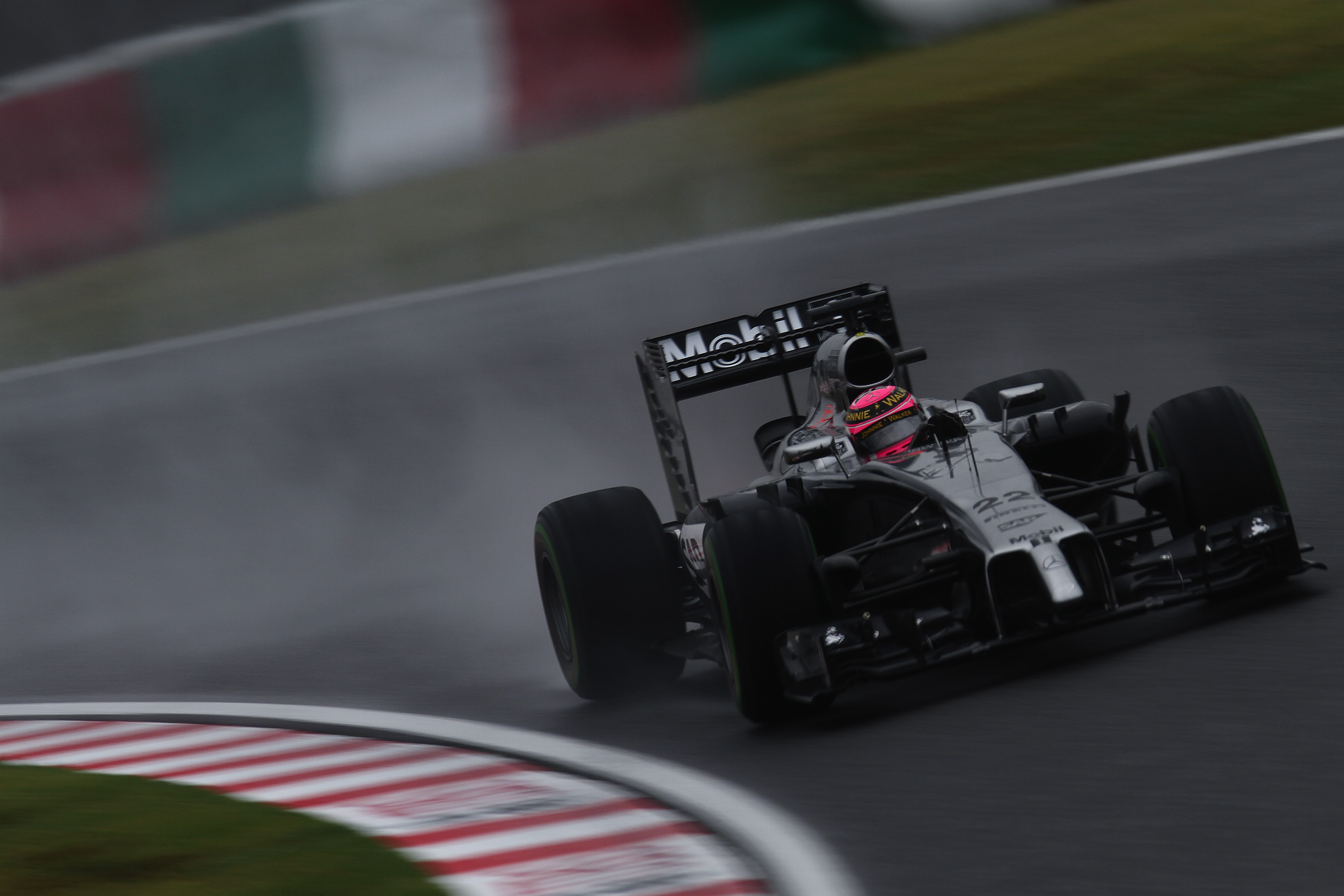
Button driving the MP4-29 at the Japanese Grand Prix

The team failed to record another podium finish all season, and although statistically, the MP4-29 was the most mechanically reliable car of the season with 36 classified finishes out of a possible 38, they ultimately finished fifth in the Constructors' Championship.

== Sponsorship and livery ==
After losing the Vodafone sponsorship, the car ran with a full chrome livery and black accents. During pre-season testing and in the video game F1 2014, and F1 2015 (via its 2014 season mode) the car's sidepods and rear wing featured the name of the car. Sponsor stickers on the car come from Mobil 1, Hugo Boss, and TAG Heuer.

Ahead of the Australian Grand Prix, McLaren announced that it would initially compete without a new main sponsor, but instead with black sidepods and large Mobil 1 logos. This was due to the 20-year partnership between McLaren and the ExxonMobil corporation. At the following races, Esso, SAP, and Johnnie Walker were advertised on the open spaces.

== Aftermath ==
=== McLaren MP4-29H/1X1 ===
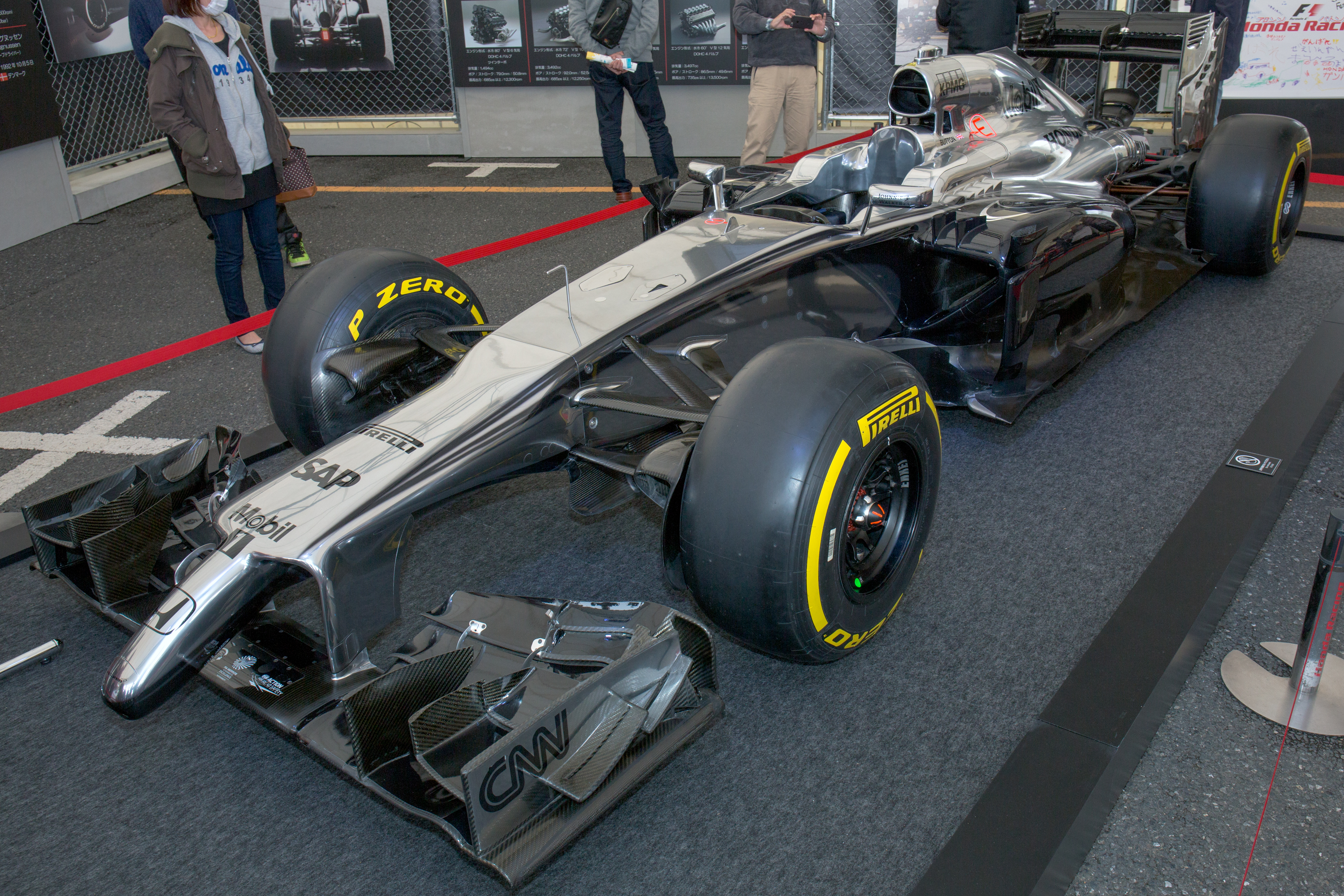
MP4-29H/1X1 on display at Motor Sport Japan 2015 Festival in Odaiba

A variation of the MP4-29, known as the McLaren MP4-29H/1X1 was introduced as a development car ahead of the team's engine partnership with Honda in 2015. After completing a shakedown at Silverstone, the McLaren ran the MP4-29H at the post-season tests at the Yas Marina Circuit in the week after the Abu Dhabi Grand Prix, where it was driven by McLaren's development driver Stoffel Vandoorne. The car suffered problems throughout, completing a total of six untimed laps over the two-day test.

== Complete Formula One results ==
(key)

Year	Entrant	Engine	Tyres	Drivers	1	2	3	4	5	6	7	8	9	10	11	12	13	14	15	16	17	18	19	Pts	WCC
2014	McLaren Mercedes	Mercedes PU106A Hybrid	P		AUS	MAL	BHR	CHN	ESP	MON	CAN	AUT	GBR	GER	HUN	BEL	ITA	SIN	JPN	RUS	USA	BRA	ABU‡	181	5th
2014	McLaren Mercedes	Mercedes PU106A Hybrid	P	Kevin Magnussen	2	9	Ret	13	12	10	9	7	7	9	12	12	10	10	14	5	8	9	11	181	5th
2014	McLaren Mercedes	Mercedes PU106A Hybrid	P	Jenson Button	3	6	17^{†}	11	11	6	4	11	4	8	10	6	8	Ret	5	4	12	4	5	181	5th

Notes:

- † — Driver failed to finish the race, but was classified as they had completed greater than 90% of the race distance.
- ‡ — Teams and drivers scored double points at the Abu Dhabi Grand Prix.
