= McLaren MP4-30 =

2015 Formula One racing car

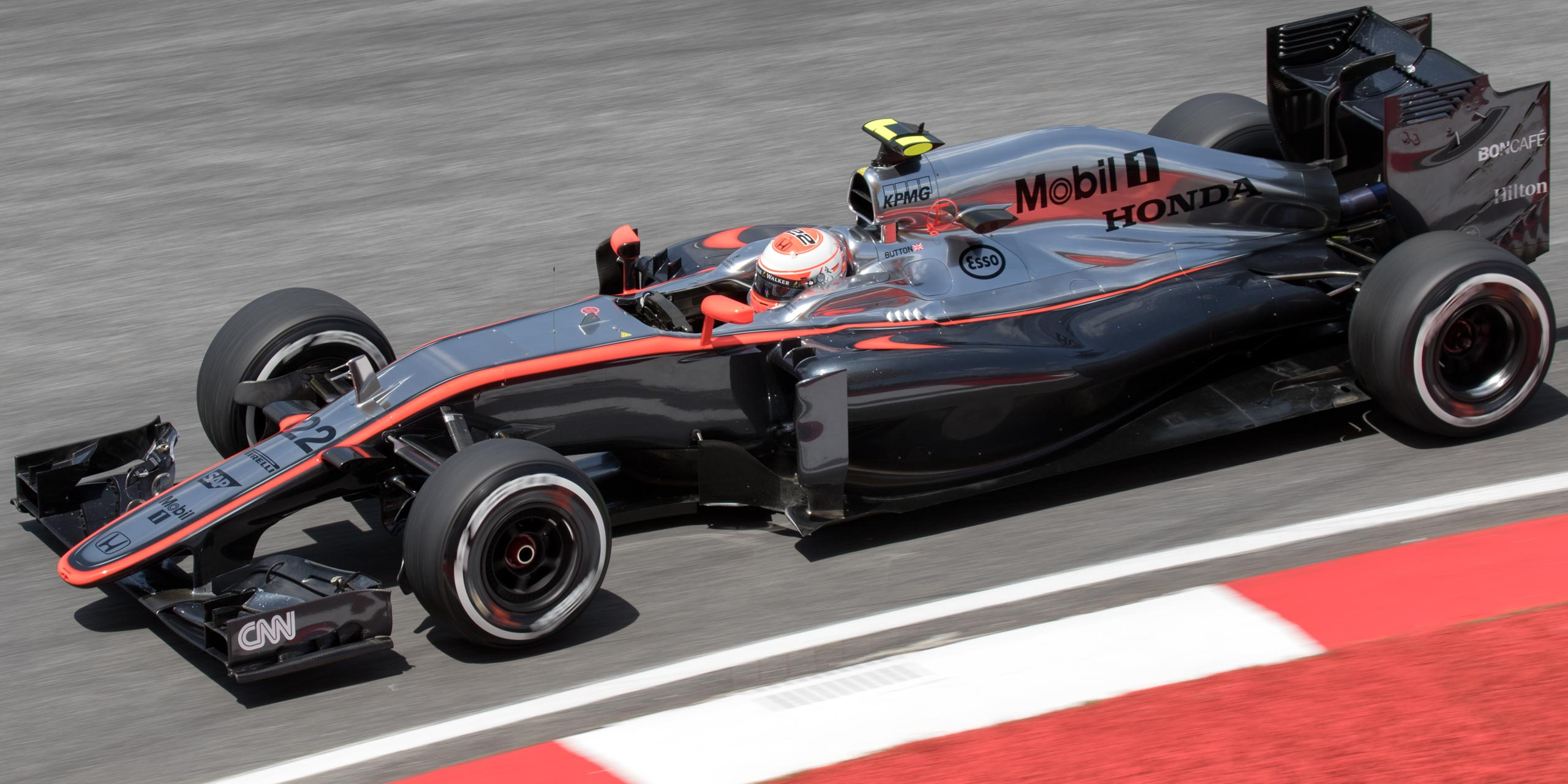
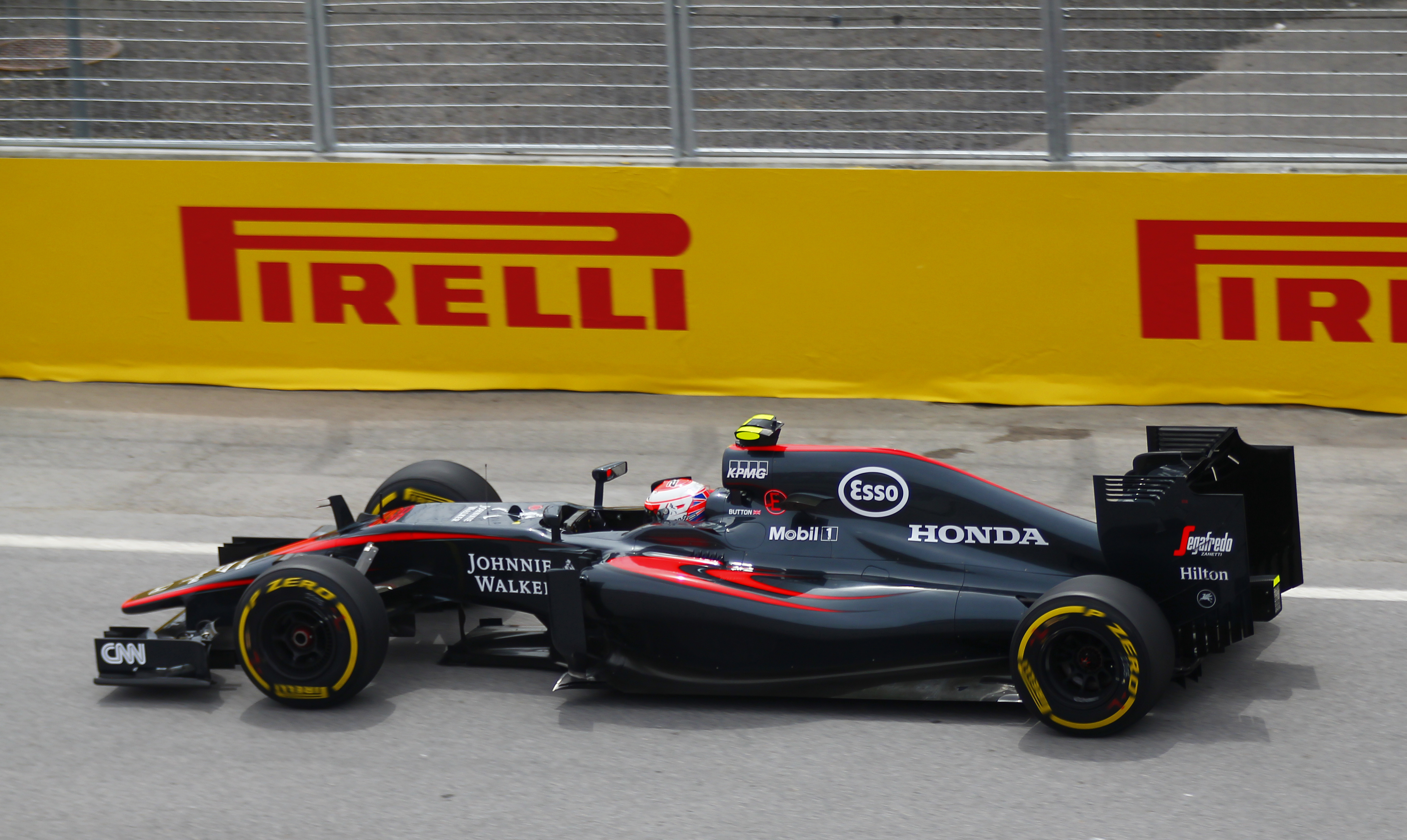
- An MP4-30 driven by Jenson Button at the Malaysian Grand Prix (top, in its original livery) and the Canadian Grand Prix (bottom, in its updated livery)
- Category: Formula One
- Constructor: McLaren
- Designers: Tim Goss (Chief Technical Officer); Matt Morris (Engineering Director); Peter Prodromou (Aerodynamics Director); Mark Ingham (Head of Vehicle Design); Guillaume Cattelani (Head of Aerodynamics); Barney Hassell (Chief Engineer - Performance); Peter Schroder (Chief Engineer - Systems); Yasuhisa Arai (Chief Technical Officer, Engine - Honda)
- Predecessor: McLaren MP4-29
- Successor: McLaren MP4-31

Technical specifications
- Chassis: Carbon-fibre composite survival cell
- Suspension (front): Pushrod system with inboard torsion bars and dampers
- Suspension (rear): Pullrod system with inboard torsion bars and dampers
- Length: 5,100 mm (201 in) for conventional nose; 5,070 mm (199.6 in) for stepped nose
- Width: 1,800 mm (71 in)
- Height: 950 mm (37 in)
- Wheelbase: 3,520 mm (139 in) with -/+25 mm (0.9843 in) adjustable by adjusting the toe depending on circuit layout
- Engine: Honda RA615H 1.6 L (98 cu in) V6 direct injection turbocharged engine, limited to 15,000 rpm in a mid-mounted, rear-wheel drive layout
- Electric motor: Kinetic and thermal energy recovery systems
- Transmission: McLaren 8-speed + 1 reverse sequential seamless semi-automatic paddle shift with epicyclic differential and multi-plate limited slip clutch
- Battery: Honda lithium-ion batteries
- Weight: 702 kg (1,548 lb) (with driver), 617 kg (1,360 lb) (without driver),567 kg (1,250 lb) (without driver and fluids)
- Fuel: Esso and Mobil High Performance Unleaded (5.75% bio fuel)
- Lubricants: Mobil 1
- Brakes: Akebono brake-by-wire carbon discs with steel calipers
- Tyres: Pirelli P Zero dry slick and Pirelli Cinturato treaded intermediate and wet tyres Enkei 13" magnesium racing wheels
- Clutch: AP Racing electro-hydraulically operated, carbon multi-plate

Competition history
- Notable entrants: McLaren Honda
- Notable drivers: 14. (Spain) Fernando Alonso; 22. (United Kingdom) Jenson Button
- Debut: 2015 Australian Grand Prix
- Last event: 2015 Abu Dhabi Grand Prix
Races	Wins	Podiums	Poles	F/Laps
19	0	0	0	0

The McLaren MP4-30 is a Formula One racing car designed by Tim Goss and Neil Oatley for McLaren to compete in the 2015 Formula One season. The car was driven by 2005 and 2006 World Drivers' Champion Fernando Alonso, who returned to McLaren eight years after he last drove for the team and 2009 World Champion Jenson Button. Kevin Magnussen, who drove for the team in 2014, temporarily stood in for Alonso after a test accident. Additional testing and development work was carried out by Magnussen, Stoffel Vandoorne and Oliver Turvey. The car was the first built by McLaren since the MP4/7A—which contested the 1992 season—to be powered by a Honda engine and second McLaren Formula One car in history to run with a turbocharged Honda engine since the dominant MP4/4 of 1988. The 2015 engine was designated as the RA615H, after McLaren ended their twenty-year partnership with Mercedes at the end of the 2014 season. The McLaren MP4-30 was also the first Honda-powered Formula One car to utilize ExxonMobil fuel and Mobil 1 lubricant products since the Williams FW11 in the 1987 season. The MP4-30 was also the first McLaren car to use an engine manufacturer other than Mercedes since Peugeot-powered McLaren MP4/9 in 1994 season.

The car was nicknamed the "size zero Formula One car" by the team for its distinct sharply tapered rear end, which was achieved by designing the Honda engine to operate at higher temperatures than other engines. At the end of the season, the car recorded a best finish of fifth place at the Hungarian Grand Prix, and had scored just twenty-seven points, leaving McLaren ninth in the World Constructors' Championship. Button and Alonso were classified in sixteenth and seventeenth positions respectively, in the World Drivers' Championship, while Magnussen was not formally classified, as he did not start the one race that he entered. This made 2015 the most difficult season in Formula One that the team had endured in 35 years, as a string of technical problems and retirements compromised the car's performance. An analysis of the project pointed towards failure in communication between McLaren and Honda, Honda under-estimating the technology required for the engine, and critical faults in the engine's design, as the cause of the team's problems.

== Design and development ==
=== Design team ===
Having developed the McLaren MP4-29 in 2014, Tim Goss and Neil Oatley returned to design and build the MP4-30. Peter Prodromou, who previously worked for McLaren between 1991 and 2006, was recruited back to the team from Red Bull Racing—where he had served as the team's Head of Aerodynamics—to aid in designing the MP4-30 and to oversee the team's trackside operations alongside former Sauber designer Matt Morris.

The RA615H engine was developed at Honda's Automobile Research and Development facilities in Utsunomiya in Tochigi Prefecture—the same facility used to develop the Honda Civic WTCC for use in the World Touring Car Championship and the Honda NSX-GT to compete in the Japanese Super GT championship—with the project led by Yasuhisa Arai and also McLaren earned direct factory works support from Honda.

=== Early development ===
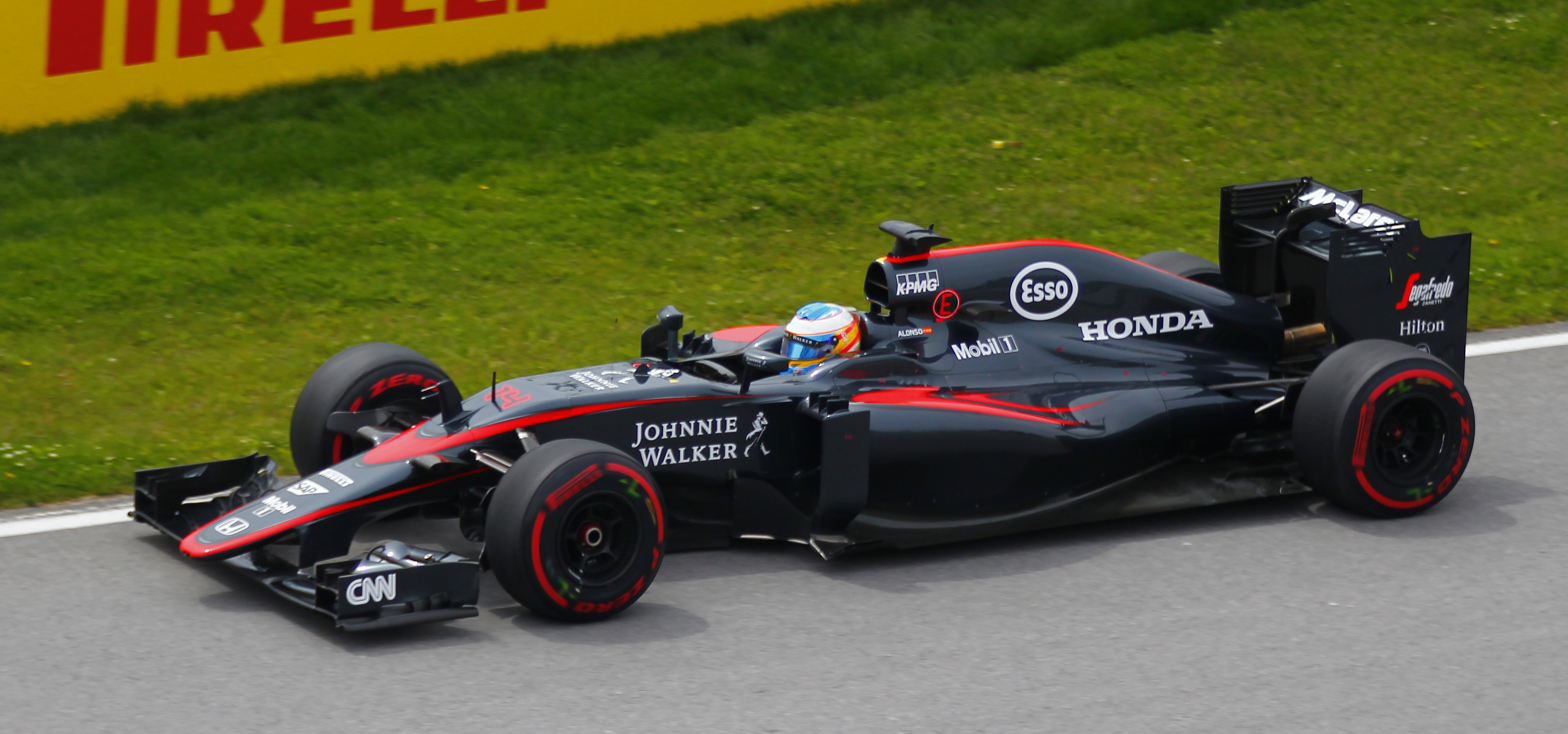
MP4-30's sculpted sidepods was developed as part of the team's "size zero" design philosophy

Honda had previously competed in Formula One as a constructor when they purchased British American Racing in 2006, before selling the team to Brawn GP ahead of the 2009 season. With the sport introducing a brand-new engine formula in 2014 and Mercedes, their engine-supplier, establishing their own team, McLaren sought a new engine supplier with a view to a long-term relationship. The partnership with Honda was first announced in May 2013, and the RA615H engine spent the next eighteen months in development. The team used Mercedes' PU106A Hybrid engine in the McLaren MP4-29 throughout the 2014 season.

Development of the McLaren MP4-30 started with the McLaren MP4-29H/1X1, a variation of the MP4-29 that was developed to test the new engine. The car made appearances at test sessions at the Silverstone and Yas Marina Circuits, where it was driven by McLaren's testing and development driver Stoffel Vandoorne. The testing programme of the MP4-29H/1X1 was limited by technical problems with the engine that prevented significant running and the chassis was shelved following its appearance at Yas Marina, with the team carrying the engine over to the MP4-30 chassis ahead of the first pre-season test of the 2015 season at Jerez de la Frontera. The car was the first of the 2015 entries to pass its mandatory crash tests, getting final approval from the Fédération Internationale de l'Automobile (FIA) in December 2014.

=== Livery ===
Ahead of the 2015 season, McLaren revealed the MP4-30 car with a black and silver chrome livery with red trim on 29 January 2015. The initial livery was criticized by fans because it included the silver element which was considered as Mercedes-Benz's de facto official corporate colour that caused disappointment for most McLaren fans. Later in the season, McLaren ditched the original black, silver and red trim livery and thus unveiled a revised livery featuring dominant black and red colours starting from the Spanish Grand Prix.

=== Pre-season testing ===
The MP4-30 made its début at the first pre-season test at the Circuito de Jerez. The team endured a difficult start, with the RA615H engine suffering from a series of recurring mechanical faults that restricted the team's running over the four days, and they finished the test having completed the least amount of mileage among those present. The issues that had plagued the car were not resolved in time for the second test at the Circuit de Barcelona-Catalunya, prompting McLaren to replace some parts supplied by Honda with parts that they had developed independently in 2014. The team finally managed to get some substantial running in during the final test in Barcelona; after completing just seven laps on the first day, Jenson Button was able to complete over one hundred on the second. However, with two weeks until the opening race, the longest stint of continuous running that the MP4-30 had completed was twelve laps of the Barcelona circuit. This distance—55.8 km (34.7 mi)—is less than a quarter of a full Grand Prix distance of 307.1 km (190.8 mi). (Note: The sporting regulations state that a Grand Prix race distance is 305 km (190 mi), with the exception of the Monaco Grand Prix.)

==== Testing accident ====
The team's pre-season preparations were overshadowed by an accident involving Fernando Alonso on the final day of testing that saw Alonso hospitalised with a concussion and ruled out of the third and final test. Kevin Magnussen, McLaren's test and reserve driver, was drafted in as his replacement for the remainder of the test and the opening round of the season. Alonso later attributed the accident to a steering failure, although McLaren maintained that there was no evidence of a car failure in the telemetry data following the accident.

=== Power unit — Honda RA615H ===
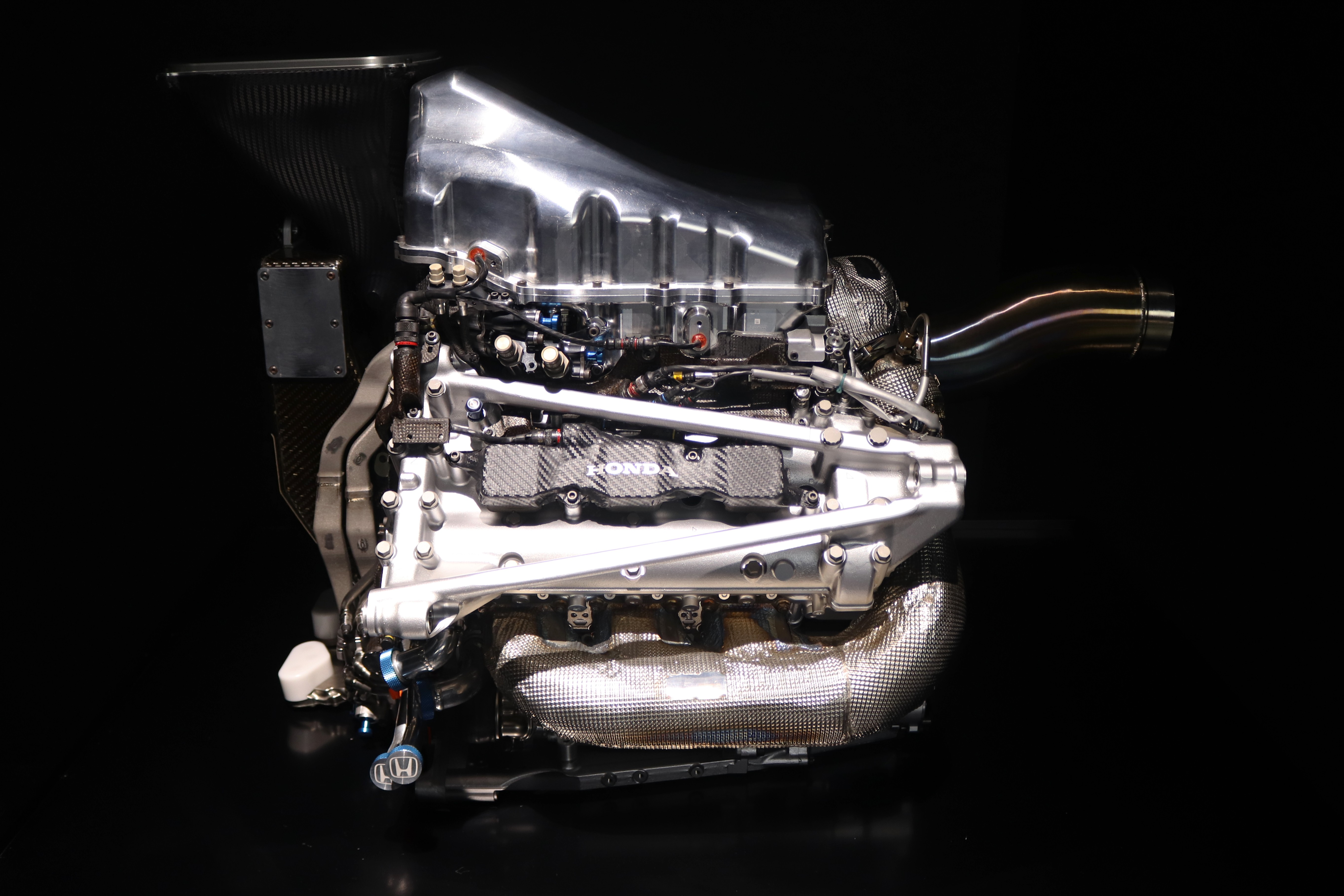
Honda RA615H power unit

An analysis of the RA615H revealed that Honda had developed the power unit with the 2016 season in mind; although no substantial revisions to the Technical Regulations had been put forward, the decision was made so that Honda could make a head-start on developing its 2016 engine without wasting time trying to maintain development of a juvenile power unit in 2015. Furthermore, with McLaren developing the MP4-30 to have tight packaging, Honda introduced several radical concepts to the engine that allowed them to develop a smaller engine that weighed just 145 kg (320 lb) and would fit within the confines of the chassis, with the trade-off being that it required additional water cooling to keep temperatures under control.

First, the turbocharger was split and positioned alongside the Motor Generator Unit-Heat (MGU-H)—the generator harvesting heat energy from the exhaust manifold used to power the turbine—and positioned within the cylinder banks forming the 'V' configuration of the engine. In order to make this fit, Honda eschewed the use of a centrifugal fan in its single-stage compressor in favour of using several smaller fans positioned at intervals along a shaft. Although this would limit the ability of the turbocharger to build up the maximum amount of boost pressure, the 100 kg/h (220 lb/h) fuel flow limit introduced in 2014 minimised the impact of this. The Motor Generator Unit-Kinetic (MGU-K)—the generator harvesting energy from the engine spinning while under braking—was positioned in front of the engine to deliver energy directly to the crankshaft, following the convention established with the introduction of the kinetic energy recovery system in 2009. The batteries housing the energy harvested by the MGU-H and MGU-K were merged with the Electronic Control Unit and positioned in front of the engine. Both the MGU-H and MGU-K were capable of harvesting 4 MJ (1.1 kWh) of energy per lap. However, under the 2015 regulations, both systems could only deploy 2 MJ (0.56 kWh) of energy per lap.

At the Hungarian Grand Prix, it was noted that Honda had taken the unusual step of giving each engine an individual designation such as "PU18 'Greyhawk'" and "PU22 'Erica'".

=== In-season development ===
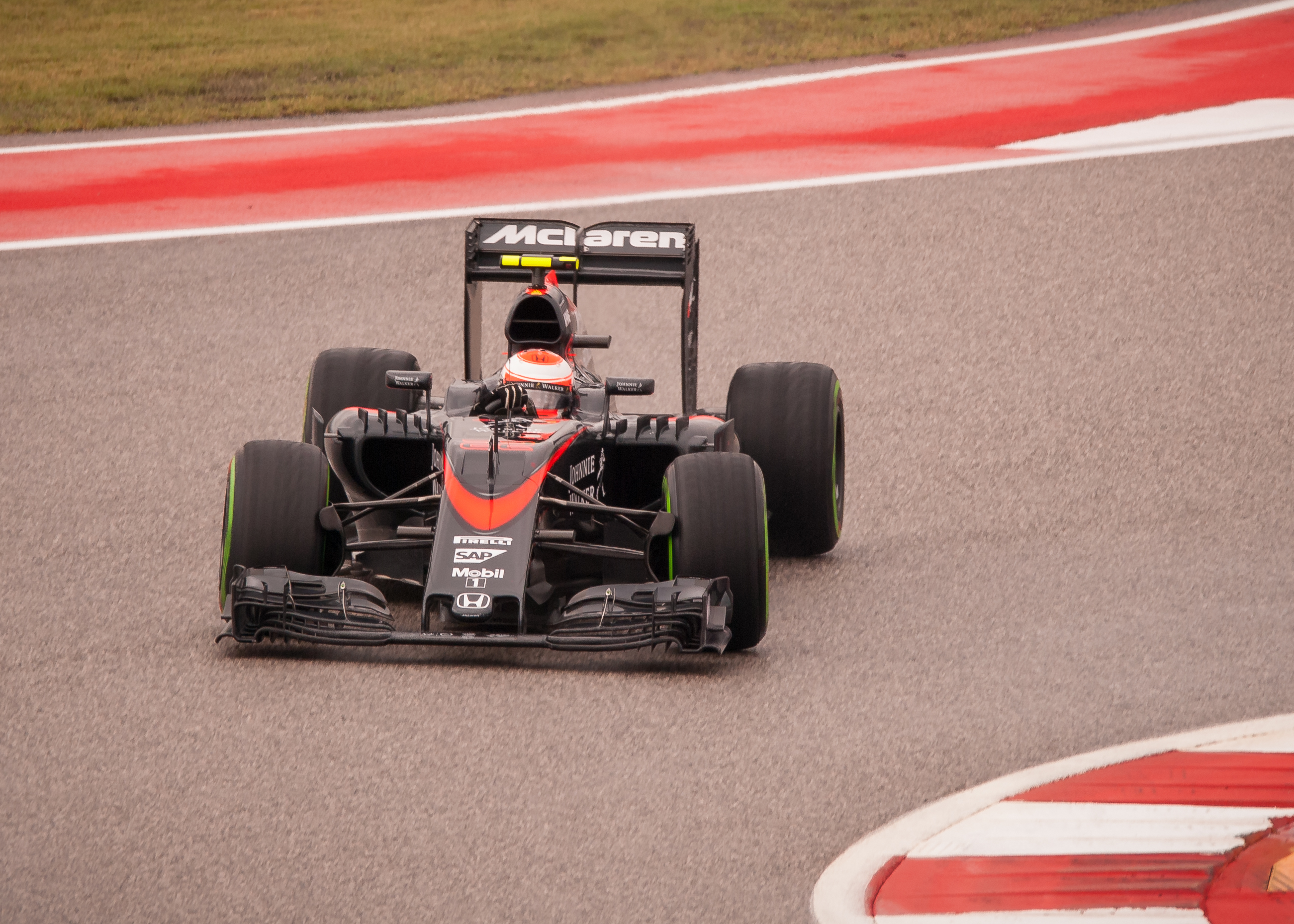

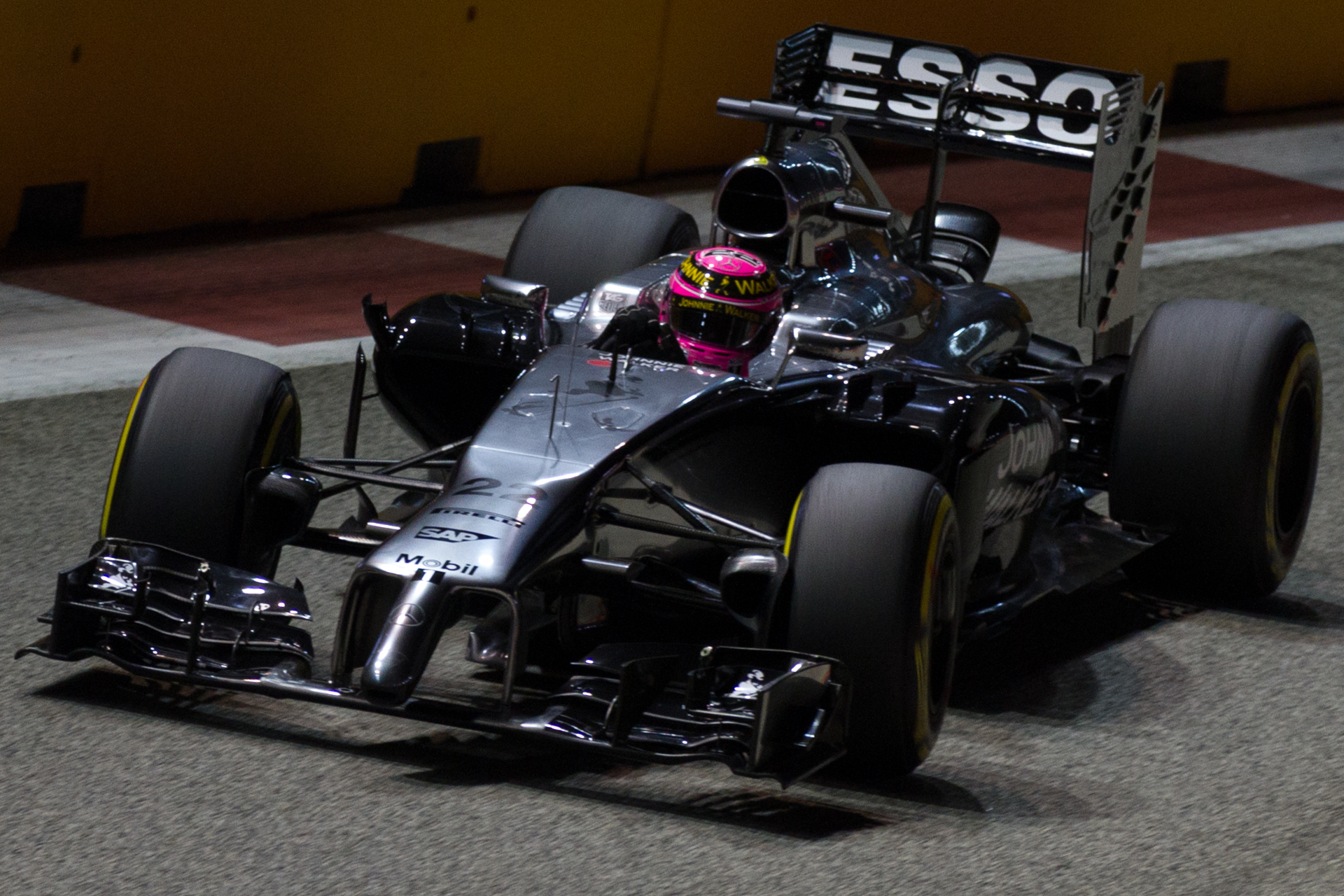
Comparison between the MP4-30 (top) and its immediate predecessor, the MP4-29 (bottom), showing the substantial revisions to the front of the monocoque.

With each engine manufacturer on the 2015 grid being granted some limited scope to develop their engines, McLaren and Honda were given some leeway to develop the RA615H power unit before it was required to be homologated despite having had eighteen months of uninterrupted development prior to the first race. Under the 2015 regulations, the power units were divided into thirty-two areas for development, and Honda were given permission to develop nine over the course of the season. The first engine updates were introduced at the Canadian Grand Prix, aimed at improving the reliability of the motor generator units, but by mid-season, the engine was reported to be producing 120 bhp (89 kW) less power than the Mercedes PU106B Hybrid engine, the benchmark of the 2015 grid.

During preparations for the British Grand Prix, Ron Dennis, the McLaren CEO and chairman, noted that the team was encouraged by the aerodynamic data they had collected on the chassis, particularly its mid-corner speeds which he claimed were similar to those produced by other teams. He further added that the car's performance issues could be traced back to a lack of outright power and poor fuel efficiency from the engine. Éric Boullier, the team principal, further suggested that the main problem that the team faced was improving the efficiency of the RA615H's energy recovery systems, both in harvesting and deploying the additional power, and that by developing these areas, the car could make up several seconds on lap time, enough for the car to compete regularly for podium finishes.

After the engine struggled with reliability issues throughout the first half of the season, Yasuhisa Arai declared himself happy with Honda's progress following the British Grand Prix and announced that the development focus would switch to improving the performance of the RA615H ahead of the next round of planned updates at the Belgian Grand Prix, with plans for a wider range of updates spread out over the remainder of the season, with the Singapore Grand Prix earmarked as the first race that would be representative of the new engine's performance. Honda predicted that the updated RA615H would produce enough horsepower to rival the Ferrari 059/4 engine. Despite being an average 13.3 km/h (8.3 mph) slower than the fastest driver through the speed trap over the first half of the season, an analysis of the engine's performance revealed that it had gradually reduced the deficit to the Renault Energy-F1 2015. Yasuhisa Arai went on to suggest that the engine had a 25 bhp (18.6 kW) advantage over Renault, but was still an estimated 50 bhp (37.3 kW) behind Mercedes.

The updates introduced in Belgium included changes to the combustion chamber, intake and exhaust aimed at reducing stress on other engine components to allow them to operate at peak efficiency. An analysis of the team's mechanical problems further suggested that there was a critical fault in the internal combustion chamber that was having a residual effect on the other components by placing undue stress on them, and an inefficient MGU-H that was using energy faster than it could be harvested with the net effect that the engine would lose up to 160 bhp (120 kW) halfway through a lap. During the race, the car was observed to be harvesting energy at the top of the Kemmel Straight—the fastest point on the circuit—while other cars were deploying their energy at the same place. Despite Arai's insistence that the RA615H had an advantage over the Renault engine, Fernando Alonso estimated that the car was losing up to three seconds per lap to Mercedes at the Italian Grand Prix and was unable to attack or defend its position against the Renault-powered Scuderia Toro Rosso cars, even with the drag reduction system deployed. Alonso's comments came amidst the first public signs of tension between McLaren and Honda with reports that the team had requested that Arai be removed from his position as Project Manager. An analysis of the development carried out by rival manufacturers revealed that both Mercedes and Ferrari had found an additional 40 bhp (29.8 kW) over the course of the season through the development of bespoke fuel blends and the reconfiguration of their combustion chambers to promote more efficient fuel burning, offsetting the gains made by Honda.

Honda started to introduce their third and final round of upgrades ahead of the Russian Grand Prix, focusing on the internal combustion engine and associated exhaust parts with the aim of improving the efficiency of the MGU-H and gradually introducing new parts over the next three rounds. The engine ancillaries were reconfigured to allow for better packaging within the chassis, while the axial compressor was replaced with a more conventional—albeit smaller—design. The exhaust wastegate was also updated ahead of planned development for 2016, with the exhaust outlets reconfigured to improve the engine's power curve. Honda chose to focus on the internal combustion engine instead of directly addressing the problems with the MGU-H as they felt that the problems could not be adequately addressed with their remaining allowance for in-season development, and instead deferred development of the MGU-H until the end of the season when the restrictions on development would be lifted. The upgrades were given to Alonso, with Button scheduled to receive them two rounds later at the Mexican Grand Prix. The updates were received positively by Alonso, who pointed out that he had been setting lap times that were faster than those recorded by Lewis Hamilton during the opening phase of the race, and that the team had identified the potential to gain two and a half seconds per lap in 2016 through further refining of the engine and by adopting aerodynamic design elements used by other teams. Button was less optimistic, pointing out that the engine would struggle in Mexico as the high altitude of the Autódromo Hermanos Rodríguez—some 2,229 metres (7,313.0 ft) above sea level—would leave the turbine down on power given the low density of the air. Although the team's predictions of a difficult weekend were proven true after qualifying, they highlighted the deficit to the leading Mercedes through the less power-dependent sectors of the circuit as being consistently within three tenths of a second, the narrowest the margin had been over the course of the season.

=== Reception ===
The RA615H was widely criticised by the wider Formula One community, with the team's struggles becoming a recurring theme throughout the 2015 season. This criticism was particularly directed at Honda's Project Manager Yasuhisa Arai and the rigidly compartmentalised structure between the two companies that saw Honda develop the engine independently of and with minimal input from McLaren, and their failure to recruit any engineers from rival engine manufacturers Mercedes, Ferrari and Renault, even after Arai's acknowledgement that Honda had underestimated the demands of the sport and the technology required to compete. Responding to the criticism, Arai claimed that the "size zero" approach demanded by McLaren—attempting to create a more compact design to fit the tight packaging of the MP4-30 chassis—had compromised the overall design of the engine and limited the ability to develop it over the course of the season. Fernando Alonso defended the move, suggesting that Honda's independent development programme would make it difficult for other manufacturers to copy the RA615H's design. McLaren CEO Ron Dennis took a broader view, attributing the team's difficult season to a range of factors—including chassis development and staff morale—rather than the engine performance alone.

Further criticism was directed towards McLaren's decision to consciously limit Honda's involvement in the sport to supplying a single team, with Scuderia Toro Rosso and the embattled Manor Marussia touted as a potential Honda customer to gather additional data. However, the team rejected the criticism, arguing that the infrastructure needed to establish such a partnership would distract from their own campaign, and earmarking the 2017 season as the earliest possible date that an expansion could be considered. With the team revising its performance targets down from podiums to regular points, Éric Boullier acknowledged that the team would be facing a budgetary shortfall for the 2016 season, estimated to be some US$23 million (£15 million), as the team had originally anticipated finishing fifth rather than ninth in World Constructors' Championship, and with it, a great share of prize money.

In the build-up to the Japanese Grand Prix, Alonso noted that although addressing the power unit's shortcomings remained the team's biggest challenge, he was unhappy with some of their trackside operations, citing a lack of running in Friday practice sessions, under-preparedness in starting procedures and pit stops, and unreliability of other parts—such as the gearbox—as compounding the problems with the engine. After being powerless to defend against repeated overtakes during the race, Alonso was overheard condemning the RA615H as "embarrassing" and a "GP2 engine" over the radio.

Despite Honda alluding to running the engine at its peak performance at the Hungarian Grand Prix, the former driver and Sky Sports commentator Martin Brundle opined that he felt McLaren were pursuing a research and development programme rather than a pure racing programme, and so were looking for different outcomes for the season rather than outright results. With Button qualifying thirteenth for the Russian Grand Prix, half a second behind the Red Bull of Daniil Kvyat, Brundle described the team as having made "their first meaningful progress of the season". However, three races later and following the upgrade introduced in Mexico, Brundle said that the engine was still down on power, inefficient, and lacking reliability and therefore suffering the same issues that had plagued it since the start of the season.

At the conclusion of the 2015 season, Yasuhisa Arai left his role within the team. He was replaced by Yusuke Hasegawa, the managing director of Honda Research and Development, as Honda focused on development of the RA615H's successor, the RA616H.

== Competition history ==
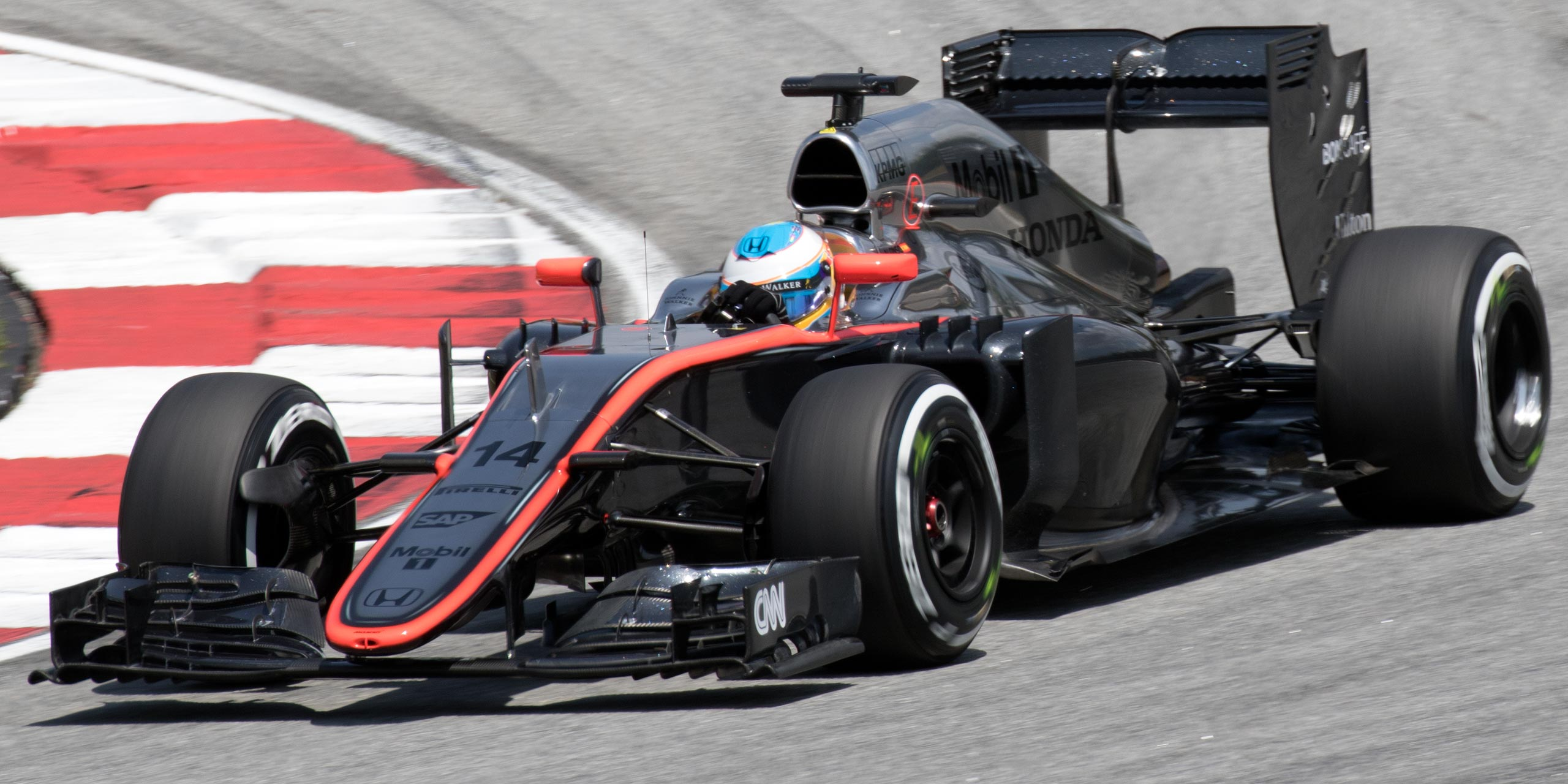
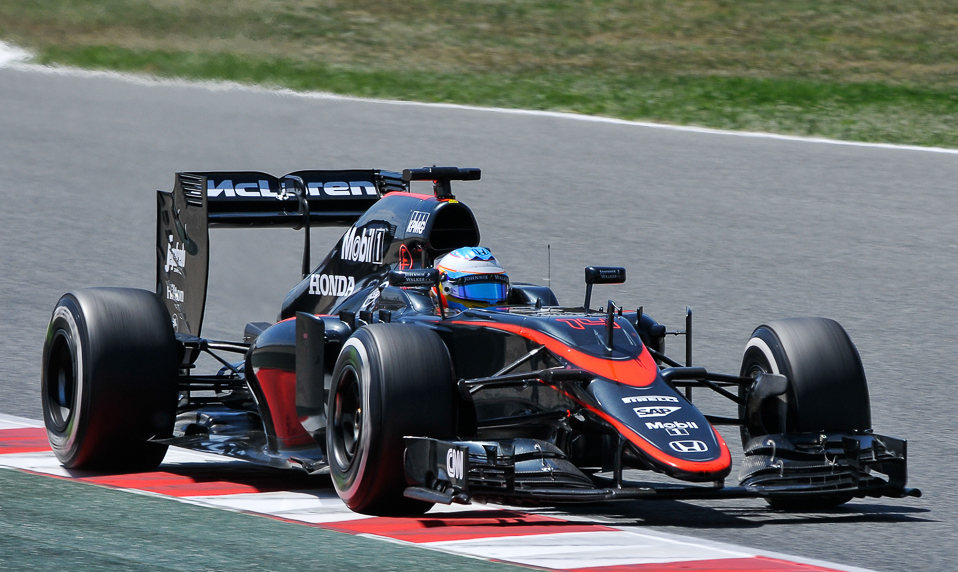

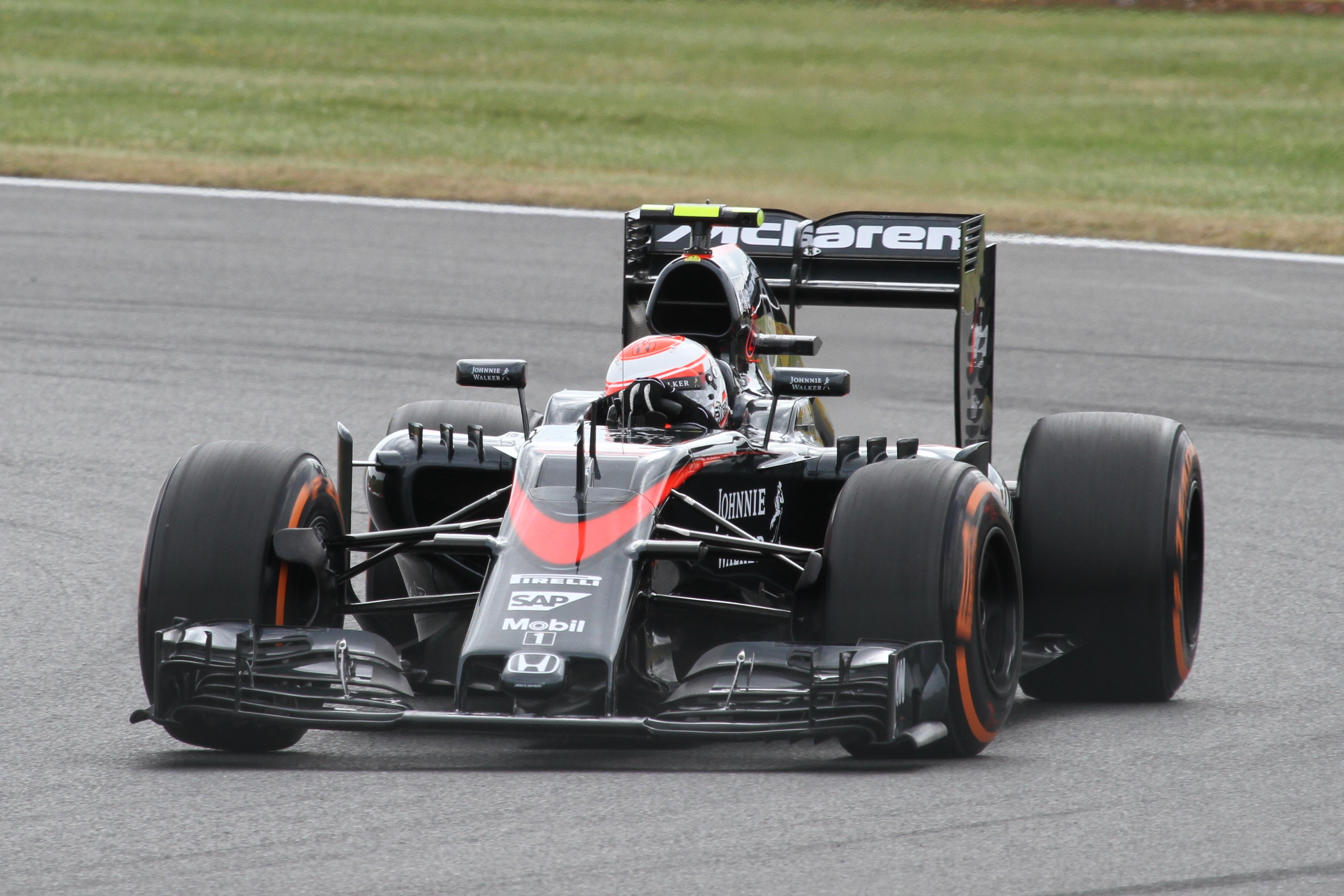
The MP4-30 in its original guise at the Malaysian Grand Prix (top), reliveried MP4-30 with a snub nose and updates to the front wing at the Spanish Grand Prix (centre) and MP4-30 with revisions to its nose at the British Grand Prix (bottom).

=== Season review ===
==== Opening rounds ====
Two weeks before the Australian Grand Prix, Fernando Alonso withdrew from the race on medical advice following his testing accident. Having driven in Alonso's stead during pre-season testing, Kevin Magnussen remained with the team for the race. The team endured a difficult start to the season in Melbourne as Button and Magnussen qualified on the final row of the grid, detuning the engine ahead of the race to preserve its reliability; Button would later be recorded going through the speed trap at 288 km/h (179 mph), some 21 km/h (13 mph) slower than the fastest car. In a race of attrition, Button was the final classified finisher, in eleventh position, two laps behind the race winner. In doing so, he completed the MP4-30's first full race distance. Magnussen did not make it to the start after his engine failed whilst driving to the grid.

Alonso returned to the team for the Malaysian Grand Prix, where the engine was retuned to operate at a higher level of performance and the team introduced a range of aerodynamic updates including sidepod fins and a new front wing. However, Alonso and Button still qualified on the penultimate row of the grid ahead of the Manor Marussia drivers Roberto Merhi and Will Stevens. Both cars retired from the race with mechanical problems. The team did not score any points during the first round of flyaway races, struggling with poor reliability and a lack of engine performance; the Chinese Grand Prix was the only race where both cars were classified as finishing. Although Alonso repeated the team's best finish of eleventh place in Bahrain, any hope of improved performance was arrested with the start of the European season at the next round in Spain, where Button finished sixteenth and Alonso retired with brake problems.

==== European season ====
Button scored the car's first points in Monaco, with an eighth-place finish. He later attributed the result to having confidence in the car, noting that he could raise the ride height at the front end of the car and brake heavily without locking the brakes or bottoming out and hitting the road, but without compromising the performance of the car when turning in to the apex of a corner. However, in the following races in Canada and Austria, the team's struggles came to a head as they were forced to reduce the power output of the engine to levels that had not been used since Australia, and could not therefore provide a competitive package for the long straights and slow corners of the Circuit Gilles Villeneuve and Red Bull Ring. In addition, with their arrival in Austria, both Button and Alonso had used up their quota of engine components for the season, which combined with unscheduled gearbox changes, resulted in both drivers receiving twenty-five place grid penalties. (Note: As the 2015 grid only contained twenty cars, Button and Alonso were given additional drive-through penalties to be served during the race. These rules were later changed to repeal the additional drive-through penalties in subsequent races.) The team also introduced their first major aerodynamic updates for the season, replacing the snub nose of the original design with a squared-off front end similar to the designs of the Williams FW37 and Red Bull RB11. The rear of the floor was also revised, with a series of slots cut into the body in front of the rear wheels to change the air pressure flowing towards the diffuser. The team only saw limited running as Alonso retired on the opening lap after a collision with Kimi Räikkönen, but they were able to assess the new design at a post-race test. After enduring four consecutive retirements, Alonso scored his first point of the season with a tenth-place finish in Great Britain.

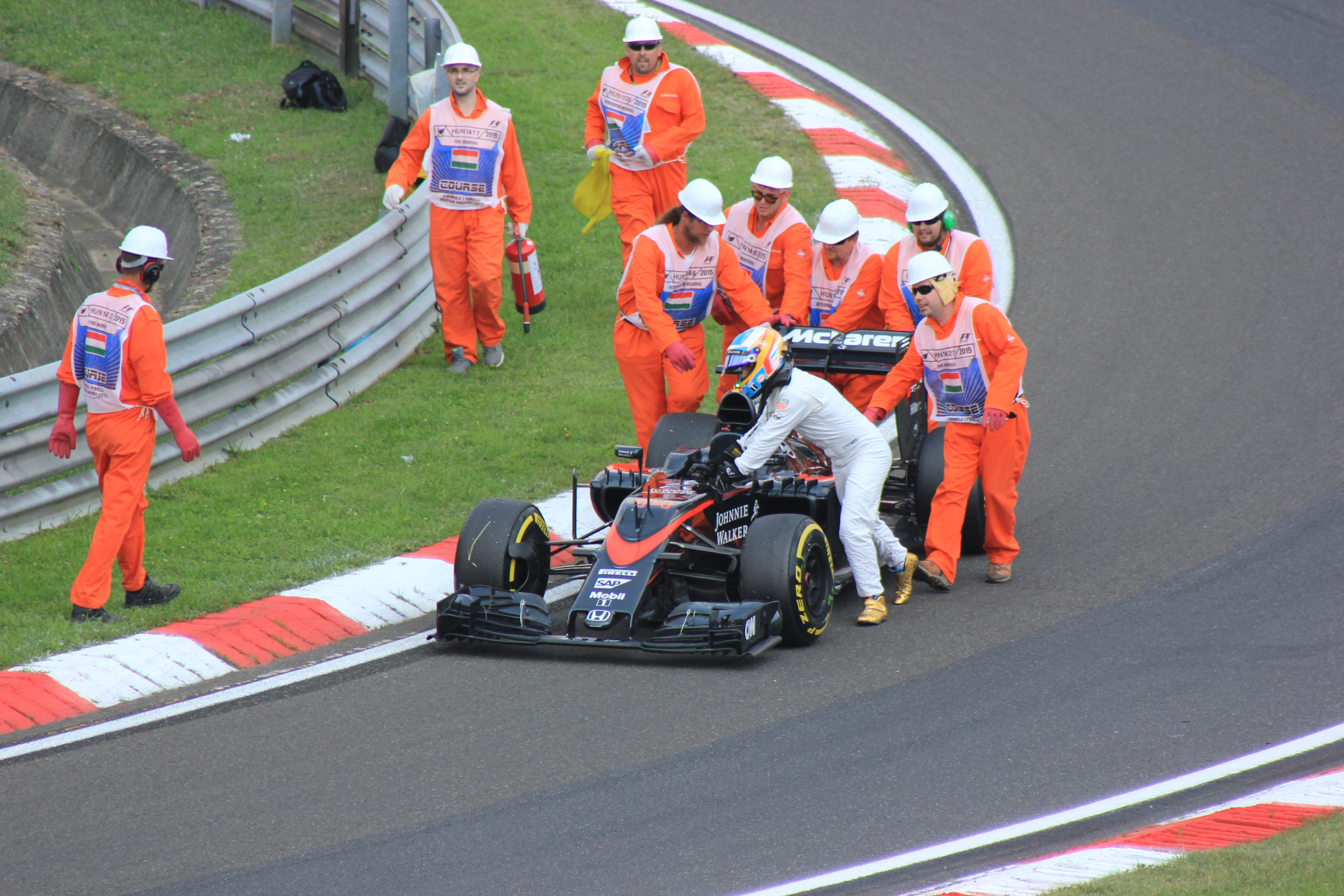
McLaren struggled with engine reliability issues throughout the season. Pictured is Fernando Alonso pushing his car back to the pits after his engine failed during qualifying for the Hungarian Grand Prix.

With the Sporting Regulations amended to allow Honda to supply an extra engine without penalty, McLaren opted to use it in Hungary, where the tight confines of the Hungaroring and lower demands on outright power were expected to benefit the MP4-30. Despite further reliability problems preventing the car from reaching the final qualifying session as the team expected, both Button and Alonso expressed satisfaction with the feeling of the chassis and the team's development, describing it as their best weekend of the season. The team went on to record their first finish with both cars in the points after Alonso finished fifth and Button ninth, and the team went into the summer break with seventeen points, five points behind Sauber in the World Constructors' Championship.

McLaren deliberately introduced two brand-new engines for both Alonso and Button at the Belgian Grand Prix, effectively moving them to the back of the grid, but allowing them to contest the Italian and Singapore Grands Prix—deemed to be crucial races in assessing the engine's development—without the risk of a penalty. Despite this plan, the team were forced to take another penalty in Italy when further engine changes were needed, bringing their total use up to nine engines from the original allocation of four. Belgium also saw the team's second major aerodynamic update: the team added extra fins to the front of the floor to improve air flow under the car, lowered the height of the sidepods and revised the engine cover. The position of the radiator used to cool the energy recovery system was also changed. Both cars completed the Belgian Grand Prix, but once again finished outside the points, one lap down in thirteenth and fourteenth place. Button described the result as "embarrassing" after both cars were classified as finishing behind Sebastian Vettel despite Vettel retiring from the race on the final lap. (Note: Although Sebastian Vettel retired from the race, he was classified as having finished as he completed 90% of the distance completed by the eventual race winner, Lewis Hamilton.) The team reverted to the longer-specification snub nose for the Italian Grand Prix in order to provide better aerodynamic balance and lower drag on the high-speed Autodromo Nazionale Monza circuit. The change proved to be of little benefit, as both drivers were eliminated in the first qualifying period and struggled throughout the race. Button finished in fourteenth, while Alonso retired with an electrical problem but was classified in eighteenth position as he had completed 90% of race winner Lewis Hamilton's race distance. The race marked a milestone of fifty races since McLaren's last Grand Prix win at the 2012 Brazilian Grand Prix.

==== Asian and American rounds ====
With the championship returning to Asia for the second round of flyaway races, the team arrived in Singapore confident of scoring points; despite both cars advancing to the second period of qualifying and running in the top ten throughout the race, both cars retired with gearbox problems. Alonso was forced out after his car kept selecting neutral without input—a problem that affected several drivers; Button was involved in contact with Pastor Maldonado while trying to pass the slow-moving Alexander Rossi during a safety car restart before his gearbox overheated. After experimenting with a new front wing designed to improve air flow around the front tyres during free practice in Singapore, the team introduced the parts at the next race in Japan one week later. However, the team struggled with tyre pressures; following Sebastian Vettel's high-speed tyre blow-out during the Belgian Grand Prix, the FIA introduced a mandatory minimum tyre pressure setting on the advice of tyre supplier Pirelli. For the Japanese Grand Prix, these pressures were raised by 2 psi (14 kPa) compared to the levels used during the 2014 race, which affected the MP4-30's ride height and vertical suspension travel and produced increased understeer. Despite taking advantage of grid penalties that saw them start twelfth and fourteenth respectively, Alonso and Button went on to finish eleventh and sixteenth. With the team acknowledging that the Singapore Grand Prix had represented their final opportunity to score points on merit, their focus shifted to development of their 2016 car over the final leg of the championship. In addition to the engine upgrades Honda brought to Russia, the team sought to use the high-speed and low-degradation characteristics of the Sochi Autodrom circuit to test experimental bodywork parts, including the exhaust configuration. In a race of attrition, both Button and Alonso initially finished in the points, with Button in ninth and Alonso taking tenth until Alonso was given a five-second penalty after the race that relegated him to eleventh place.

In addition to the engine upgrades Honda introduced for the United States Grand Prix, McLaren brought a new aerodynamic package for the MP4-30 which revised the front wing to increase downforce, altered the turning vanes to improve air flow over the front splitter, and adopted a concept pioneered by Ferrari to the rear floor designed to reduce the impact of airflow washing over the rear wheels and disrupting the rear diffuser, which in turn opened up a wider range of set-up options for the ride height and rake, or the angle between the front and rear ride height. These updates were designed to bring the MP4-30 in line with the designs developed by other teams. With the engine and aerodynamic updates, the team had hoped to compete for points on merit, and while Alonso clashed with Felipe Massa on the opening lap, he was running as high as fifth on the closing stages—and was on course to replicate the team's best result of the season—before suffering a loss of power and slipping back down the order to finish eleventh. With Alonso out of the points, Button was promoted to sixth. The race also saw what would be the car's best qualifying performance as Alonso started eleventh, while the six points Button scored saw the team close to within ten points of Sauber in the World Constructors' Championship. However, the result also meant that McLaren had endured its longest winless streak of fifty-three races, previously set between the 1977 Japanese Grand Prix and the 1981 British Grand Prix. Despite the progress that the team made over the previous rounds, the MP4-30's struggles continued in Mexico, with both drivers eliminated early in qualifying, and Jenson Button setting a new record for grid penalties, changing enough parts to warrant a seventy-place penalty. Alonso retired from the race with an incurable ERS problem that the team had identified the night before and Button finished fourteenth overall.

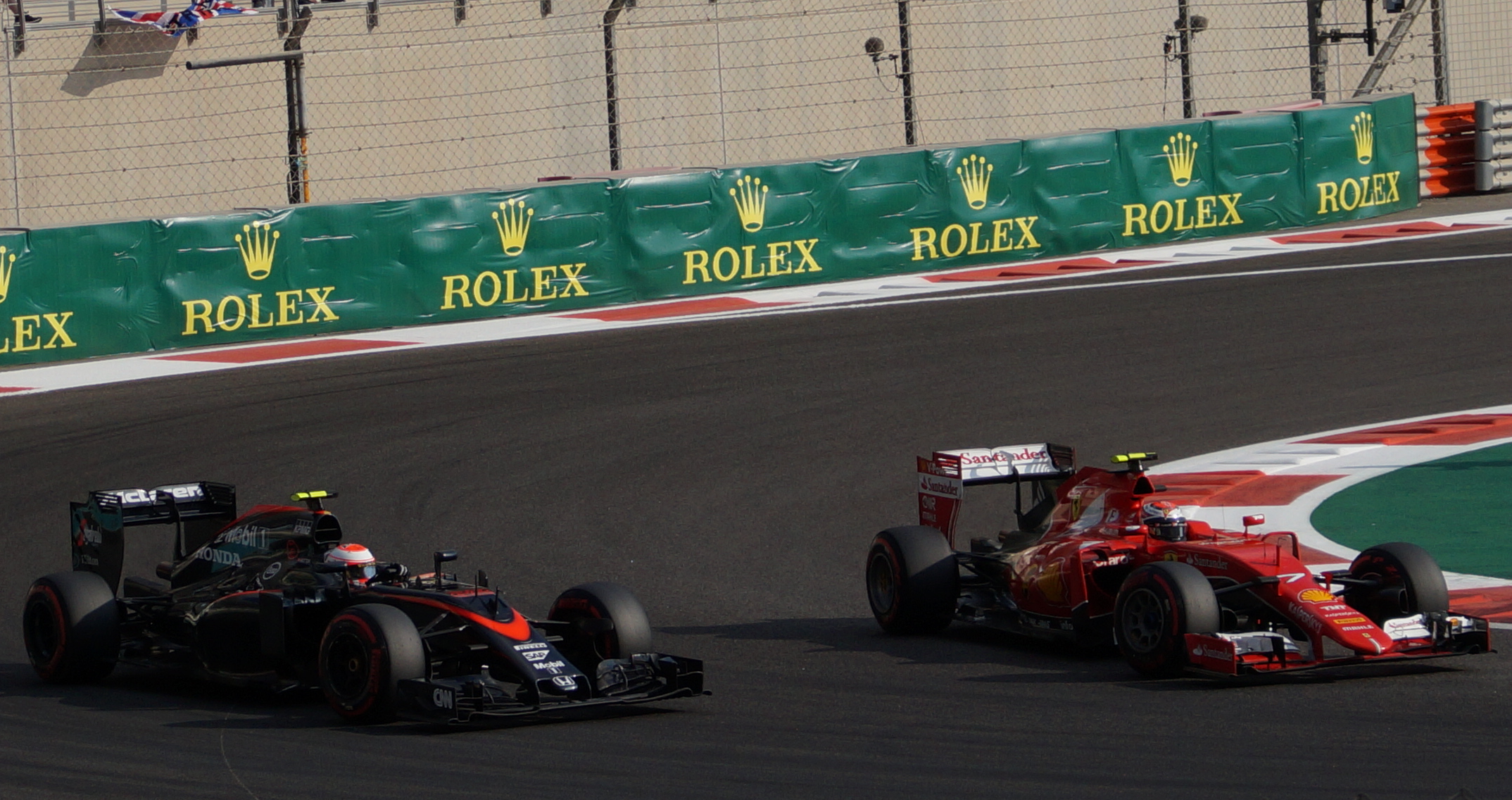
Button (left) racing Kimi Räikkönen at the last race of the season, the Abu Dhabi Grand Prix

The team's struggles continued as the championship moved to Brazil for the penultimate round, with Alonso stopping twice on the circuit during free practice with a recurring engine fault that forced him to miss qualifying. Button and Alonso finished the race in fifteenth and sixteenth place respectively, which became fourteenth and fifteenth when Felipe Massa was disqualified for a tyre pressure irregularity. Button later noted that the speed deficit of the RA615H around the Interlagos circuit relative to the other engines was "scary" despite Honda's extensive development programme. By the time the season came to a close in Abu Dhabi, McLaren had completely shifted the MP4-30's development so that the car became a testing platform for the 2016 season, with "more than half" of the parts being considered experimental, including a brand-new configuration for the rear suspension geometry. Despite an expected speed deficit on the long straights of the Yas Marina Circuit—with the MP4-30 recording speeds some 30 km/h (18.6 mph) slower than the fastest cars through the speed trap—and minor contact with Valtteri Bottas in the pit lane, Button was complimentary of the car in his drive to twelfth, describing it as "the best it had felt all year". Alonso went on to finish seventeenth after receiving a drive-through penalty for his role in causing a collision with Pastor Maldonado and Felipe Nasr on the opening lap. McLaren used Alonso's race as a chance to experiment with full and continuous deployment of the RA615H's Energy Recovery Systems—the first time the team had done so under race conditions—which saw Alonso set the third-fastest lap of the race, less than three tenths of a second slower than the fastest lap of the race recorded by Lewis Hamilton.

=== Final standings ===
McLaren finished the season ninth in the World Constructors' Championship with twenty-seven points, nine points behind their nearest rivals Sauber. The MP4-30 scored points in five of its nineteen starts, with a best result of fifth place in Hungary; the race was also the only time in which both cars finished inside the points. Jenson Button was the team's best points scorer with sixteen points to Alonso's eleven, though Alonso scored the team's best individual race result in Hungary and qualifying performance, with eleventh in the United States. The result marked Button's worst individual season since driving for Honda Racing F1 in 2008, and Alonso's worst since his debut season with Minardi in 2001.

=== Retirement from competition ===
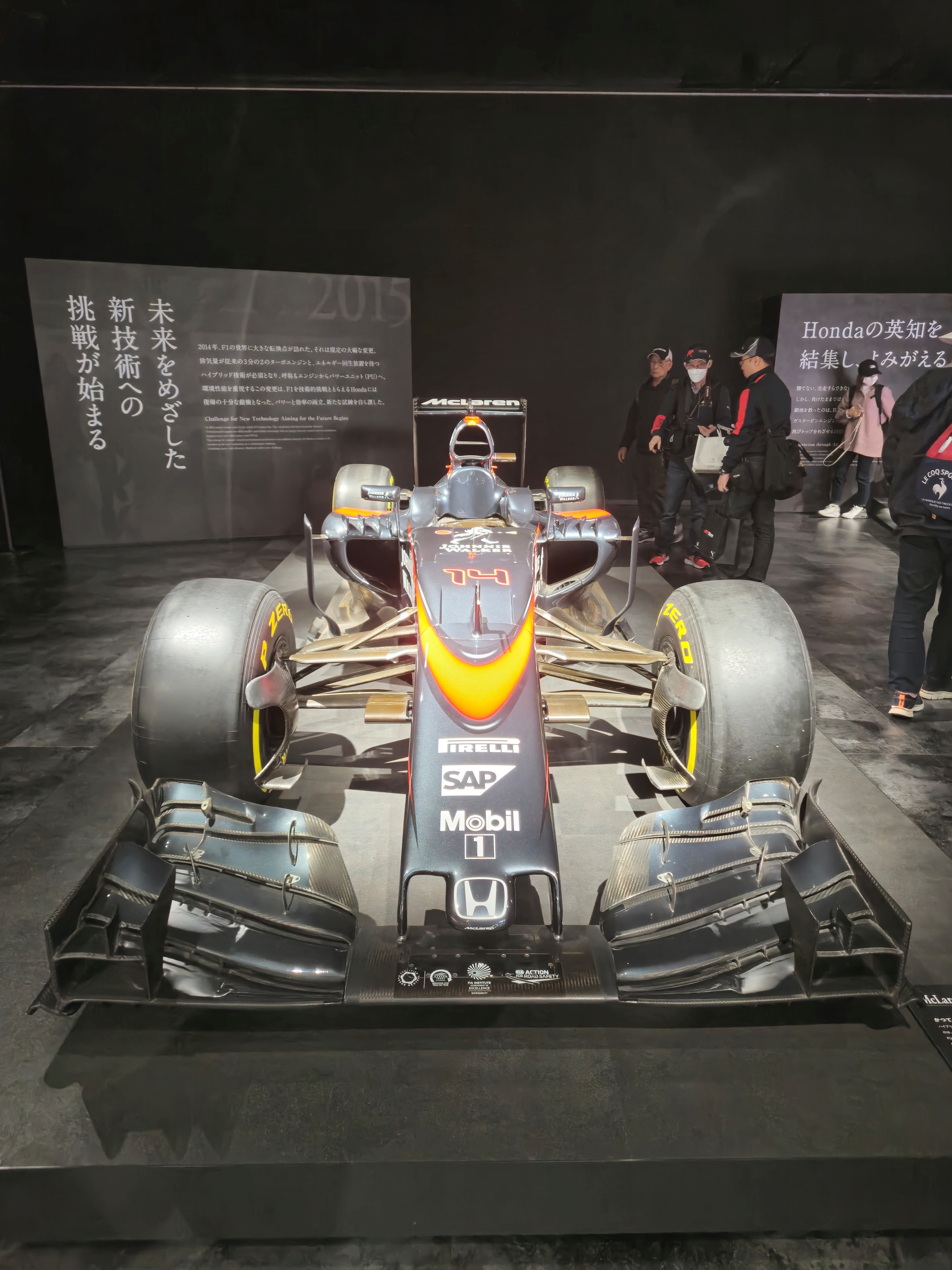
An MP4-30 on display at the Honda Racing Gallery

Following its final race in Abu Dhabi, the MP4-30 took part in a series of tests organised by tyre supplier Pirelli to assess their planned allotment of tyre compounds for the 2016 season and to give teams the opportunity to acquaint themselves with the new compounds, including four different builds of the brand-new ultrasoft compound. Stoffel Vandoorne resumed testing duties for the team for the duration of the test, where he completed ninety-nine laps and set the fastest time of the test, three tenths of a second faster than the rest of the field and four tenths faster than the fastest time set during the race. The MP4-30 made one final appearance before being retired from competition, taking part in wet tyre tests at the Circuit Paul Ricard in preparation for the 2016 season. The car was subsequently replaced by the McLaren MP4-31.

Under rules introduced in 2014, the MP4-30 was declared a "previous car" by the FIA—as were all of the cars that contested the 2015 season—restricting its use in testing and promotional filming as a means of preventing illegal testing given the similarities between the 2015 and 2016 Technical Regulations.

== Complete Formula One results ==
(key) (results in bold indicate pole position; results in italics indicate fastest lap)

Year	Entrant	Engine	Tyres	Drivers	Grands Prix																			Points	Position
Year	Entrant	Engine	Tyres	Drivers	AUS	MAL	CHN	BHR	ESP	MON	CAN	AUT	GBR	HUN	BEL	ITA	SIN	JPN	RUS	USA	MEX	BRA	ABU	Points	Position
2015	McLaren Honda	Honda RA615H	**P**	Fernando Alonso		Ret	12	11	Ret	Ret	Ret	Ret	10	5	13	18^{†}	Ret	11	11^{‡}	11^{‡}	Ret	15	17	27	9th
2015	McLaren Honda	Honda RA615H	**P**	Jenson Button	11	Ret	14^{‡}	DNS	16	8	Ret	Ret	Ret	9	14	14	Ret	16	9	6^{‡}	14	14	12^{‡}	27	9th
2015	McLaren Honda	Honda RA615H	**P**	Kevin Magnussen	DNS																			27	9th

Notes:

- † — Driver failed to finish the race, but was classified as they had completed more than 90% of the winner's race distance.
- ‡ — Results adjusted post-race following the application of penalties.
