= Sauber C32 =

Formula One racing car

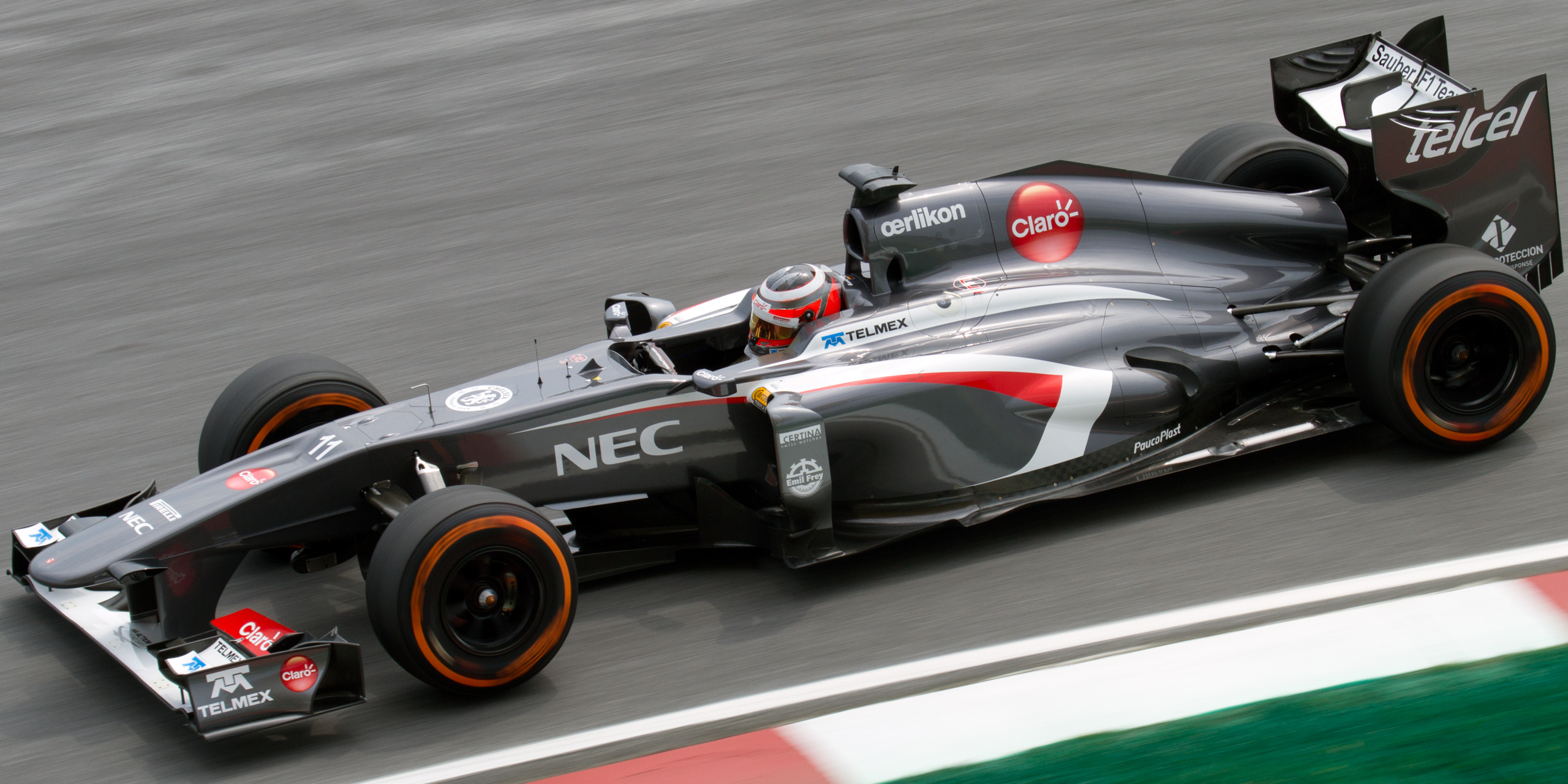
- Nico Hülkenberg driving the C32 at the Malaysian Grand Prix
- Category: Formula One
- Constructor: Sauber
- Designers: Matt Morris (Chief Designer); Pierre Waché (Head of Vehicle Performance); Willem Toet (Head of Aerodynamics); Seamus Mullarkey (Head of Aerodynamic Research); Mariano Alperin (Head of Aerodynamic Development)
- Predecessor: Sauber C31
- Successor: Sauber C33

Technical specifications
- Chassis: Moulded carbon fibre composite monocoque incorporating front and side impact structures
- Suspension (front): Upper and lower wishbones, inboard springs and dampers actuated by pushrods
- Suspension (rear): Upper and lower wishbones, inboard springs and dampers actuated by pullrods
- Engine: Ferrari Type 056 2.4 L (146 cu in) V8 (90°). Naturally aspirated, 18,000 RPM limited with KERS, mid-mounted.
- Transmission: Ferrari 7-speed quick-shift carbon gearbox, longitudinally mounted, carbon-fibre clutch
- Weight: 642 kg (1,415 lb) (including driver)
- Tyres: Pirelli P Zero (dry), Cinturato (wet)

Competition history
- Notable entrants: Sauber F1 Team
- Notable drivers: 11. (Germany) Nico Hülkenberg; 12. (Mexico) Esteban Gutiérrez
- Debut: 2013 Australian Grand Prix
- Last event: 2013 Brazilian Grand Prix
Races	Wins	Podiums	Poles	F/Laps
19	0	0	0	1

The Sauber C32 was a Formula One racing car designed and built by the Sauber team for use in the 2013 Formula One World Championship. It was driven by Mexican Esteban Gutiérrez, making his Formula One debut, and German Nico Hülkenberg, who joined the team from Force India. The car was launched on 2 February 2013.

== Design ==
The C32 was designed by Matt Morris, Pierre Waché and Willem Toet with the car being powered by a customer Ferrari engine. It features distinct narrow sidepods which, according to designer Matt Morris, were inspired by former driver Sergio Pérez's crash at the 2011 Monaco Grand Prix. Pérez hit the barrier at the Nouvelle Chicane side-on, crushing the right-hand sidepod, which led to the team investigating whether it would be possible to incorporate narrow sidepods into a future design. This proved to be much harder than first anticipated, as the internal workings of the car had to be completely reconfigured to accommodate the slimmer design.

In comparison to its predecessor, the Sauber C31, the C32 features a lower nose design. The stepped nose concept used throughout 2012 was abandoned, and the nose was modeled to give it smooth profile. The air vent positioned forward of the cockpit in 2012 was retained.

== Season summary ==
In his first race for Sauber, the Australian Grand Prix, Hülkenberg qualified in eleventh position but could not take the start due to a leak in his C32's fuel system. Esteban Gutiérrez, in his first career Grand Prix, qualified in 18th place and finished in 13th position, the highest-placed rookie. Hülkenberg achieved the team's first points of the season at the Malaysian Grand Prix, as he finished the race eighth, while Gutiérrez finished outside of the points in twelfth.

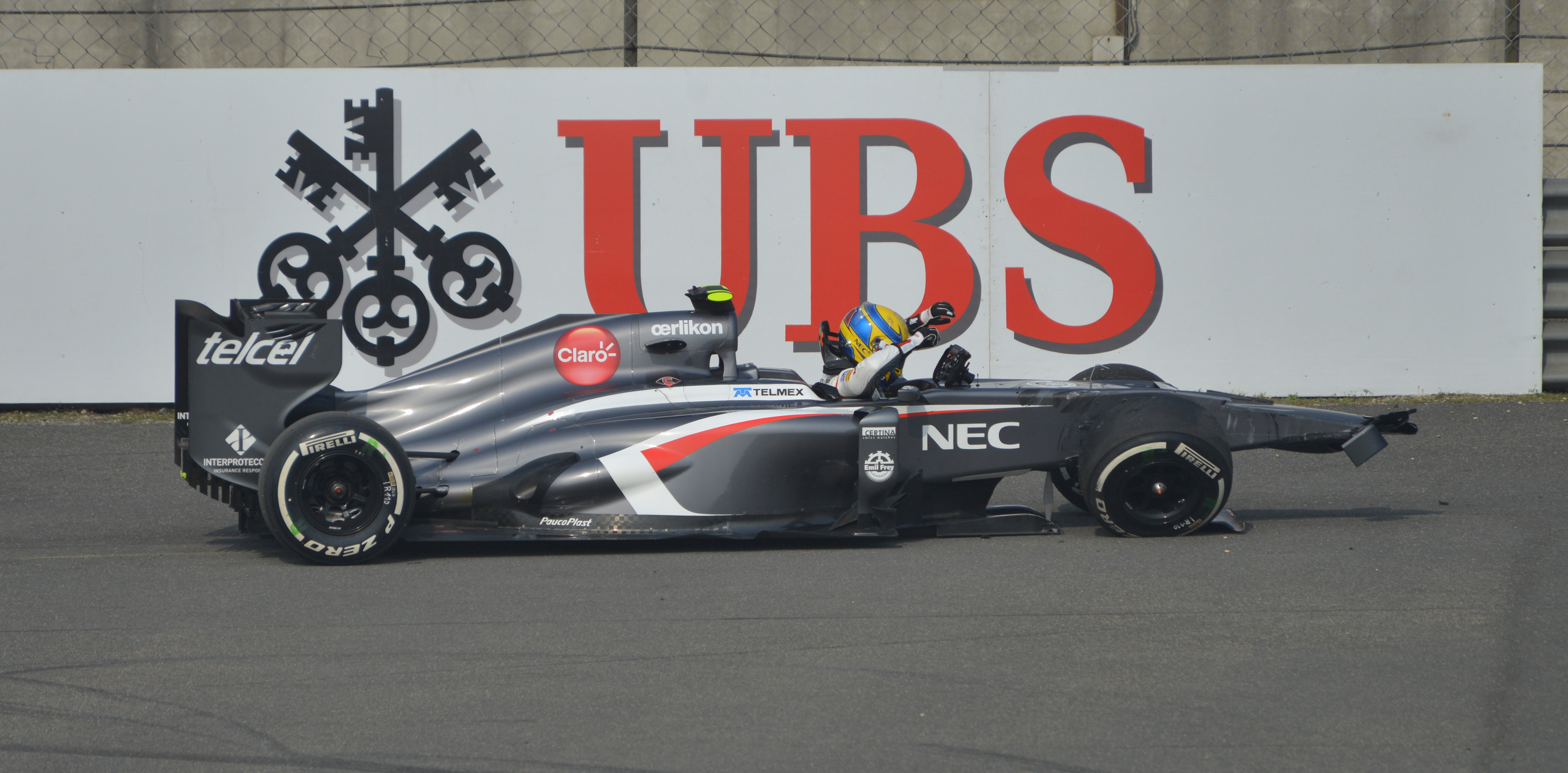
Gutiérrez exiting his stranded car at the Chinese Grand Prix

In the fifth race of the year, the Spanish Grand Prix, both drivers progressed into Q2. Hülkenberg started from 15th on the grid and finished in the same position, while Gutiérrez qualified 16th, but a penalty demoted him to 19th on the grid and he finished the race in eleventh place, but the Mexican recorded the fastest lap with a time of 1:26.217 and a speed average of 194.370 km/h (120.776 mph).

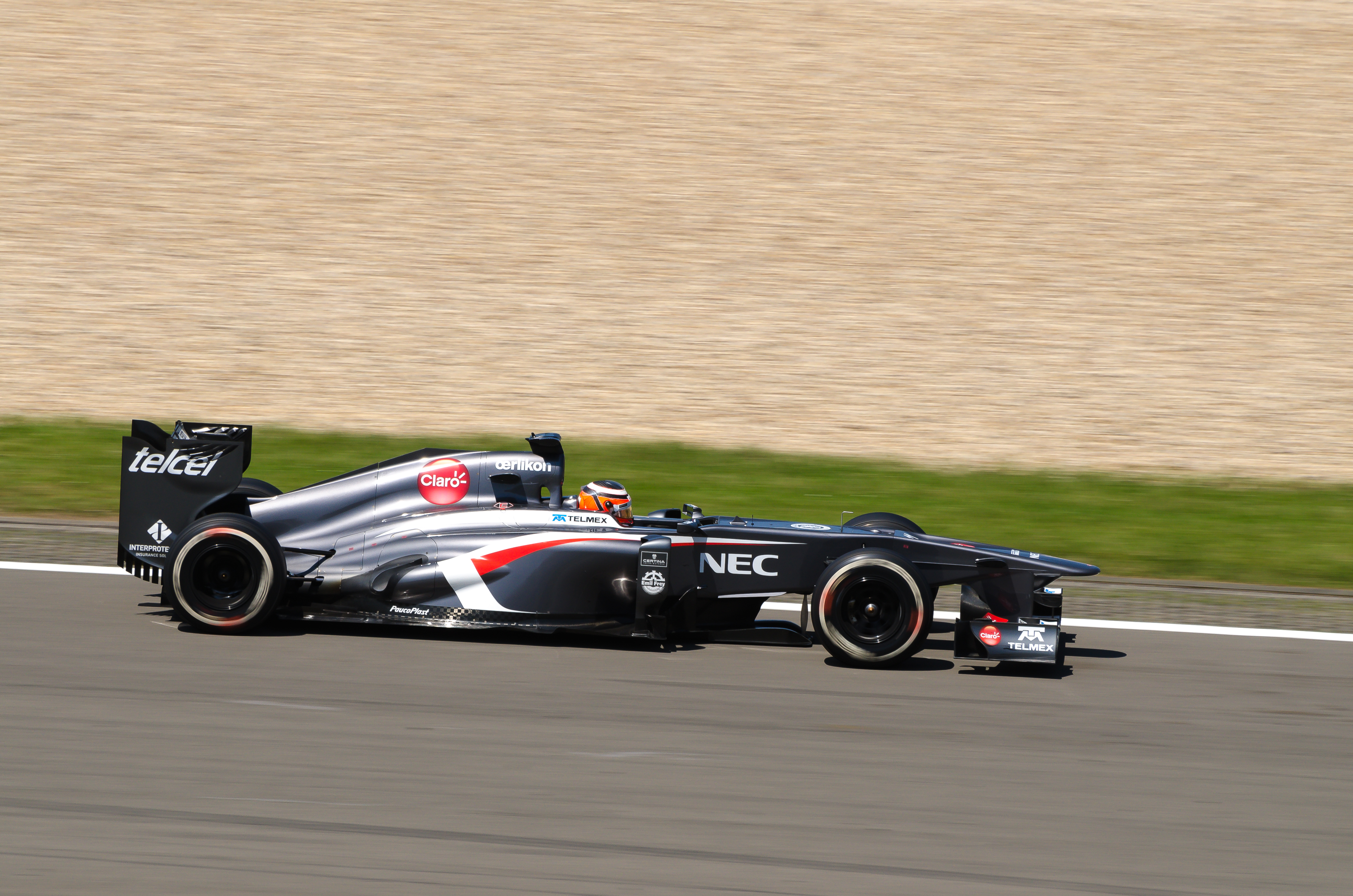
Hülkenberg at his home race, the German Grand Prix

In Canada, both cars retired due to accidents, but Gutiérrez was classified 20th for having completing 90% of the race distance. Hülkenberg finished 10th in each of the next 2 races while Gutiérrez finished 14th. The next two races, the Hungarian and Belgian Grands Prix, saw the team record consecutive failures to score. However, in the Italian Grand Prix, Hülkenberg achieved a sensational third place in qualifying, and finished the race in a good fifth position. This was the best result for Hülkenberg since moving to the Sauber team at the beginning of the 2013 season, and the best result of a Sauber since Kamui Kobayashi's one and only podium finish, third place in the 2012 Japanese Grand Prix. Before it became better in Korea with 4th place while Gutiérrez equalled his best result with 11th after qualifying 7th and 8th respectively, before the next race saw both drivers finishing in the points with 6th and 7th places, but then the points-streak ended thanks to Hülkenberg's brake failure and Gutiérrez's drive-through for jumping the start. Hülkenberg ended the year with two more points finishes while Gutiérrez's seventh place in Japan ended up being the only points he scored all year.

Overall, Sauber finished 7th in the championship with 57 points, 50 of these coming in the second part of the season, a worse record than previous year's C31, which finished 6th with 126 points and 4 podiums.

== Sponsorship and livery ==
The C32 underwent a radical livery changes, the white base was switched to a grey colour scheme with a black, red and white accents on the sides. Renewed sponsors including Claro, Telcel, Telmex, Oerlikon, NEC and Certina. Chelsea FC returned for the second year with the team.

At the Australian Grand Prix, a 20th anniversary logo and the text "20 years in Formula 1 from Kyalami to Melbourne" were seen on the noses of the cars.

The José Cuervo ad was for Cuervo Tequila except for Bahrain and Abu Dhabi, where their Cholula Hot Sauce replaced the drink because of prohibitions on alcohol advertising.

== Later uses ==
In 2018, the C32 was used during the presentation of the C37. Later in the same year, the C32 was driven by Marcus Ericsson and Charles Leclerc during the Milano Festival.

Gabriel Bortoleto drove the C32 (sporting the livery of the 2025 C45) at the 2025 Goodwood Festival of Speed.

== Complete Formula One results ==
(key) (results in bold indicate pole position; results in italics indicate fastest lap)

Year	Entrant	Engine	Tyres	Drivers	Grands Prix																			Points	WCC
Year	Entrant	Engine	Tyres	Drivers	AUS	MAL	CHN	BHR	ESP	MON	CAN	GBR	GER	HUN	BEL	ITA	SIN	KOR	JPN	IND	ABU	USA	BRA	Points	WCC
2013	Sauber F1 Team	Ferrari Type 056	**P**	(Germany) Nico Hülkenberg	DNS	8	10	12	15	11	Ret	10	10	11	13	5	9	4	6	19†	14	6	8	57	7th
2013	Sauber F1 Team	Ferrari Type 056	**P**	(Mexico) Esteban Gutiérrez	13	12	Ret	18	11	13	20†	14	14	Ret	14	13	12	11	7	15	13	13	12	57	7th

^{†} Driver failed to finish the race, but was classified as they had completed greater than 90% of the race distance.
