= Mark Ingham =

British Formula One engineer

- Occupation: Engineer
- Employer: McLaren Racing
- Known for: Formula One engineer
- Title: Technical Director - Engineering Delivery

Mark Ingham is a British Formula One engineer. He is currently the Technical Director - Engineering Delivery for the McLaren Racing Formula One team.

== Career ==
Ingham began his motorsport career in 1988 at Cosworth, working as a Development Engineer on Formula One power units. His responsibilities included cylinder head and valvetrain design, as well as the introduction of pneumatic valve technology on the Cosworth HB Series 6 engine during the 1992 season. Variants of this engine were used in multiple race-winning programmes, including Benetton's victory at the 1992 Belgian Grand Prix.

In 1994, Ingham joined Peugeot Sport as a Design and Development Engineer in Formula One, before moving to McLaren Racing later that year. Initially working as Design Project Leader – Engine Systems, he spent more than a decade in roles centred on the integration of engine-related systems within McLaren's Formula One chassis.

In 2009, Ingham became Car Design Project Leader, overseeing design coordination across vehicle systems during the transition to major aerodynamic and packaging regulation changes. He was promoted to Head of Design in 2012, taking responsibility for design leadership across McLaren's Formula One projects throughout the hybrid era.

In 2021, Ingham was appointed Director of Design at McLaren Racing, a position he continues to hold. He leads the organisation's design department across McLaren's Formula One programmes. He was one of a small handful of McLaren staff to win the contractors title in both 1998 and 2024.

In October 2026, he assumed the role of Technical Director - Engineering Delivery, and "works closely with the team’s technical, aerodynamic, performance and production functions to strengthen engineering execution and deliver performance.". He replaces Neil Houldey, who previously served as Technical Director - Applied Engineering.
