= Tim Goss =

British automotive engineer

- Born: 28 February 1963 (age 63); United Kingdom
- Education: Imperial College London
- Occupation: Motor racing engineer
- Years active: 1990-present
- Employer: Racing Bulls
- Known for: Formula One Engineer
- Title: Chief Technical Officer

Tim Goss (born 28 February 1963), is a British motor racing engineer, and Chief Technical Officer of the Racing Bulls Formula One Team.

== Career ==
Goss graduated from Imperial College London, where he also completed postgraduate studies specialising in ignition of turbocharged engines. Goss then joined Cosworth in 1986.

Goss joined McLaren in 1990, becoming the engineer in charge of engine installation design. He was then appointed assistant race engineer to Mika Häkkinen, and then became chief test team engineer. After working as head of vehicle dynamics, he then worked as chief powertrain engineer – a role in which he oversaw the introduction of the sport's first-ever seamless-shift gearbox in 2005.

In 2005, Goss was appointed Chief Engineer for the McLaren MP4-21 and led the engineering design team of the Adrian Newey designed 2006 car. After a few races it soon became clear that it was not as competitive as its predecessor, the MP4-20, despite an apparent improvement in reliability. McLaren did not win a race all season, for the first time since 1996.

Goss was appointed Director of Engineering in January 2011. In February 2013, after McLaren confirmed the departure of Paddy Lowe to Mercedes F1 effective for the 2014 season, Goss was appointed Technical Director. He held the position of technical director until 2018 when he was removed from that post and replaced by James Key.

On 18 January 2023, Goss was appointed the FIA Single-Seater Technical Director, replacing Nikolas Tombazis who became Single-Seater Director.

In January 2024, Goss joined RB Formula One Team as Chief Technical Officer.
