= Matt Morris (engineer) =

British engineer

- Born: 12 May 1974 (age 51); Worksop, England

Matt Morris (born 12 May 1974) is a British motor racing engineer and former chief engineer of the McLaren Formula One team.

== Biography ==
Morris graduated from Coventry University with a degree in mechanical engineering, joining Cosworth soon after. He remained at Cosworth until 2006, after which he joined Williams, where he stayed for eight years before joining Sauber in 2011. Morris quickly rose up the ranks at Sauber to become their chief designer, a position he held for two seasons before moving back to the UK as McLaren's chief engineer in 2013, a role he held until 26 July 2018 when he resigned.
