= Red Bull Racing RB20 =

2024 Formula One car

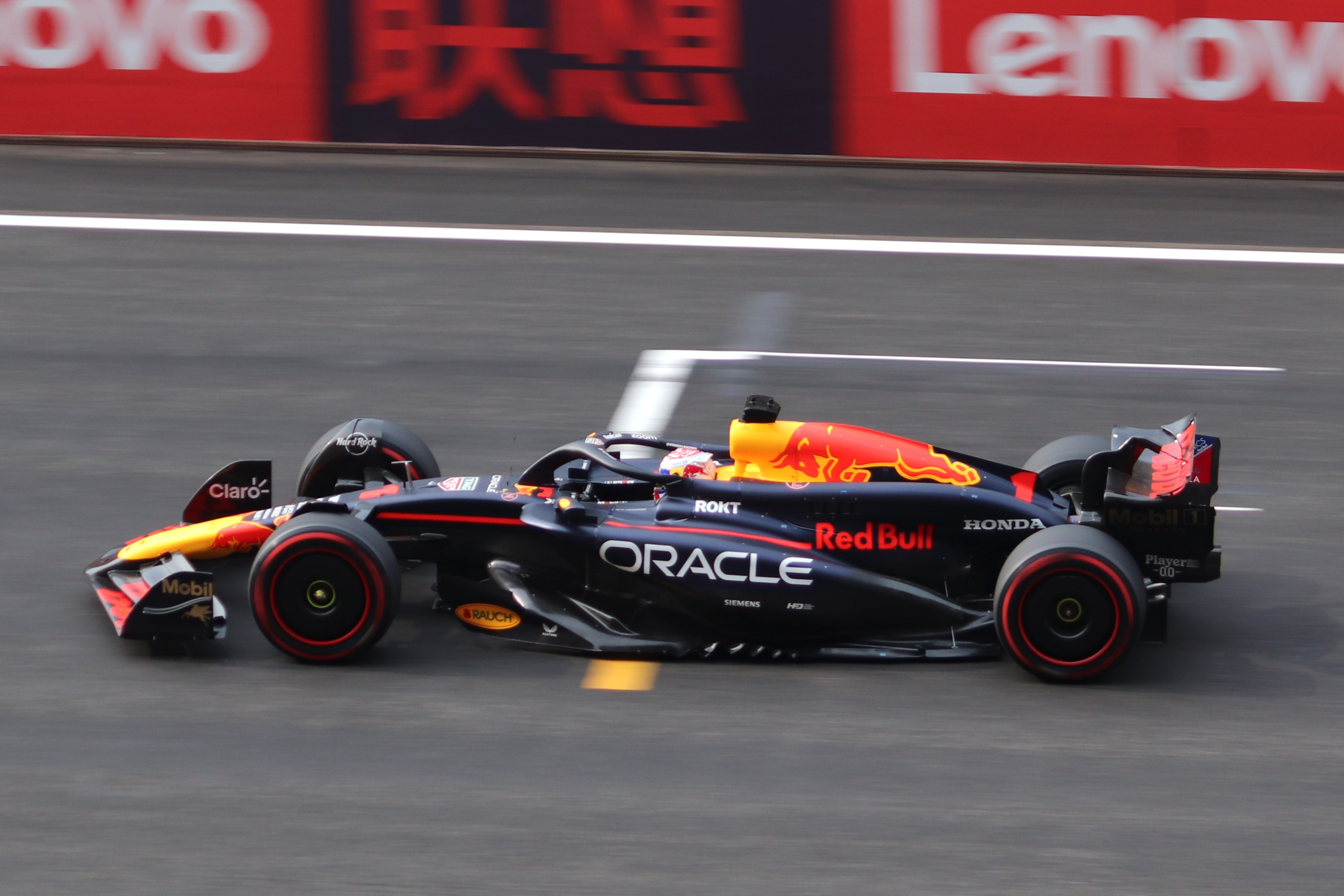
- Max Verstappen driving the RB20 during qualifying for the Chinese Grand Prix
- Category: Formula One
- Constructor: Red Bull Racing (chassis); Honda Racing Corporation (power unit)
- Designers: Adrian Newey (Chief Technical Officer); Pierre Waché (Technical Director); Paul Monaghan (Chief Engineer, Car Engineering); Craig Skinner (Chief Designer); Jerome Lafarge (Chief Designer, Composites and Structures); Edward Aveling (Chief Designer, Mechanical and Systems); Ben Waterhouse (Head of Performance Engineering); Alistair Brizell (Head of Vehicle Performance); Enrico Balbo (Head of Aerodynamics); Toyoharu Tanabe (Power Unit Technical Director - Honda)
- Predecessor: Red Bull RB19
- Successor: Red Bull RB21

Technical specifications
- Suspension (front): Multi-link pull-rod actuated dampers and anti-roll bar
- Suspension (rear): Double wishbone push-rod springs, dampers, and anti-roll bar
- Engine: Honda RBPTH002 1.6 L (98 cu in) direct injection V6 turbocharged engine limited to 15,000 rpm in a rear mid-mounted, rear-wheel-drive layout
- Electric motor: Honda Kinetic and thermal energy recovery systems
- Battery: Honda Lithium-ion battery
- Power: 1,021 hp (750 kw)
- Weight: 798 kg (1,759 lbs)
- Fuel: Esso / Mobil Synergy
- Lubricants: Mobil 1
- Tyres: Pirelli P Zero (Dry); Pirelli Cinturato (Wet)

Competition history
- Notable entrants: Oracle Red Bull Racing
- Notable drivers: 1. (Netherlands) Max Verstappen; 11. (Mexico) Sergio Pérez
- Debut: 2024 Bahrain Grand Prix
- First win: 2024 Bahrain Grand Prix
- Last win: 2024 Qatar Grand Prix
- Last event: 2024 Abu Dhabi Grand Prix
Races	Wins	Podiums	Poles	F/Laps
24	9	18	8	4
- Drivers' Championships: 1 (2024, Max Verstappen)

The Red Bull Racing RB20 is a championship-winning Formula One car designed and constructed by Red Bull Racing and powered by the Honda RBPTH002 power unit to compete in the 2024 Formula One World Championship. The car, which is the successor to the highly successful Red Bull RB19, was unveiled at the team factory in Milton Keynes on 15 February 2024. The RB20 was driven by defending World Champion Max Verstappen and teammate Sergio Pérez, the latter in what turned out to be his final season for the team, and made its competitive debut at the Bahrain Grand Prix.

Early-season rounds saw dominant pace, which was confirmed when Red Bull repeated their dominant performances shown throughout the previous year, but as the season progressed, the team found itself pressured and outpaced by rival teams, particularly by McLaren and their MCL38. While the team attempted to introduce upgrades and changes to their car to return to their season-opening dominance, an uptick of performance from McLaren and Ferrari saw them drop to third in the Constructors' Championship. However, Verstappen took two more wins at the São Paulo and Qatar Grands Prix, the former victory contributing to Verstappen ultimately sealing the Drivers' Championship at the following Las Vegas Grand Prix, but even so, Pérez's poor performance in particular - finishing in eighth with 152 points to Verstappen's 437 - meant that Red Bull was knocked out of contention for the Constructors' Championship at the aforementioned Qatar Grand Prix, where, despite Verstappen's victory, Pérez failed to finish the race due to a clutch issue. Ultimately, Red Bull finished in third in the Constructors' Championship behind Ferrari and eventual winners McLaren. The RB20 achieved 9 wins (plus 4 sprint wins, the last being at the United States Grand Prix), 18 podiums, and 8 pole positions – plus 4 sprint pole positions – and it holds 4 fastest laps.

The RB20 was the last Red Bull Formula One car to be designed by former Chief Technical Officer Adrian Newey, who left the team for Aston Martin midway through the season.

== Competitive history ==
=== Pre-season ===
After the pre-season test in Sakhir at the Bahrain International Circuit, reigning champion Max Verstappen was reported to be 'pleased' with the car's characteristics; Red Bull, who only topped the first day of testing, opted not to focus on lap times.

=== Opening rounds: Dominant form ===
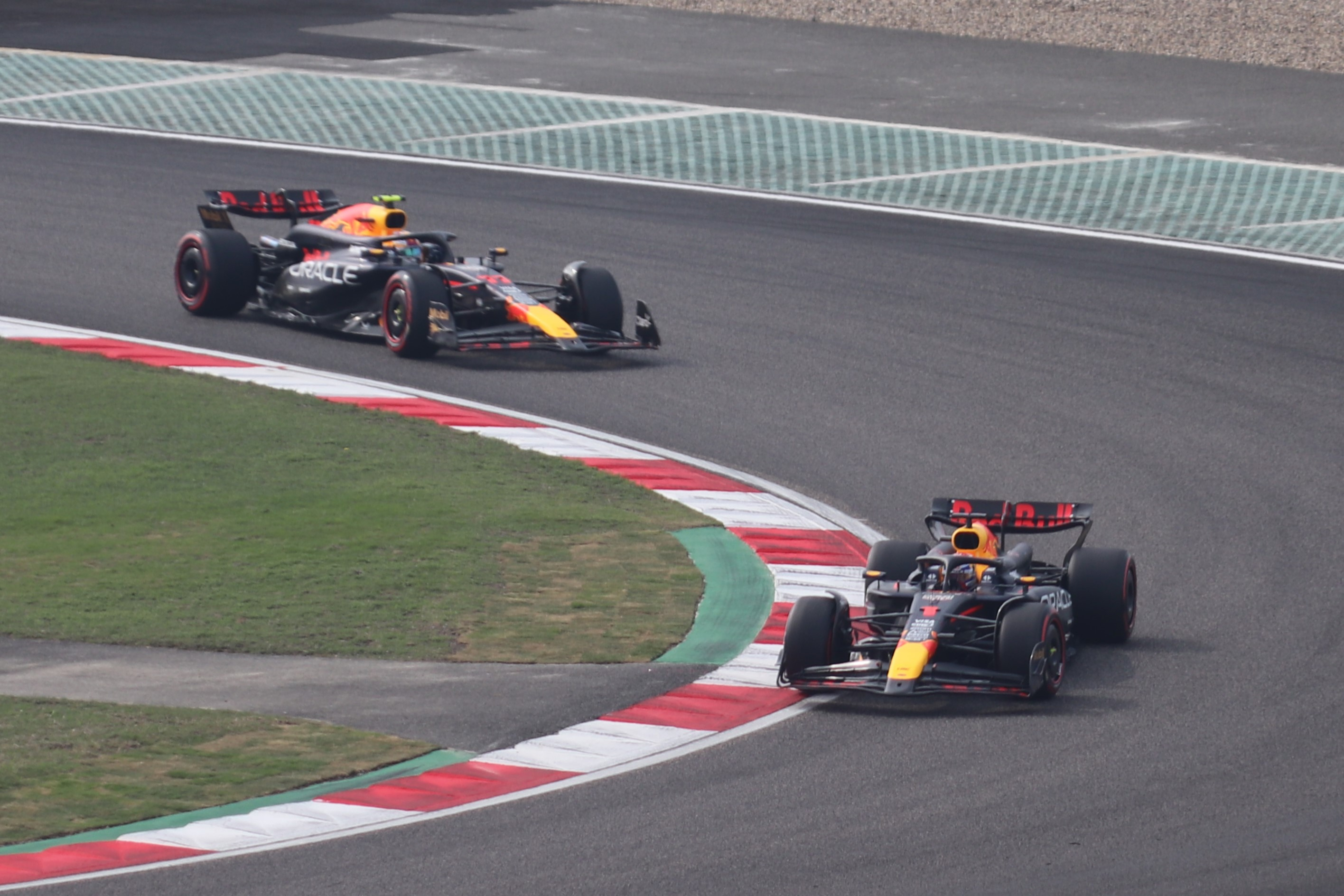
Verstappen leads teammate Pérez during qualifying for the Chinese Grand Prx.

The RB20's pace was confirmed in the subsequent Bahrain Grand Prix, where Verstappen took pole position; he then proceeded to score his fifth career grand chelem during the race itself. His teammate Pérez finished in second, 22 seconds behind him. Verstappen took another dominant victory at the Saudi Arabian Grand Prix. Meanwhile, teammate Pérez finished in second place once more, this time 13 seconds behind him. This marked Verstappen's 100th career podium.

The Australian Grand Prix saw polesitter Verstappen run into early trouble after suffering a brake failure, marking his first retirement in over two years (having retired at the same event in 2022), which allowed Scuderia Ferrari's Carlos Sainz Jr. to score a victory. Further wins and double podium finishes in the Japanese Grand Prix and Chinese Grand Prix followed. At the Miami Grand Prix, Verstappen was set to win the race, having won the sprint, but hit a bollard and damaged his floor. A safety car period then allowed Lando Norris to overtake Verstappen and take his maiden Grand Prix victory. Meanwhile, Pérez finished in fourth.

=== Mid-season rounds: Falling behind rivals ===
At the Emilia Romagna Grand Prix, Verstappen led a majority of the race from pole position and would go on to win, despite Norris closing in by the closing stages, while Pérez finished in eighth, his first finish outside of the top five this season. At the Monaco Grand Prix, Verstappen qualified and finished sixth while Pérez had a heavy tangle with the Haas cars, sending all three drivers into retirement. Verstappen won the Canadian Grand Prix after a close qualifying session with George Russell, with the race being held under intermediate conditions that facilitated changes to the wet compounds. He also won the Spanish Grand Prix. Verstappen finished ahead of Norris in both races. Meanwhile, however, Pérez failed to finish within the top five in both races; retiring in Canada after he spun the car and broke his rear wing, and finishing in eighth in Spain.

Verstappen took pole position and won the Austrian Grand Prix sprint event. He was on course to win the main race, also from pole position, before a slow stop brought Norris into contention. The two fought for the lead before colliding on lap 64, giving both cars punctures with Norris in particular being handed race-ending damage. Verstappen also received a time penalty for causing the incident, which did not affect his final finishing position of fifth. Meanwhile, Pérez finished in seventh behind Nico Hülkenberg after Hülkenberg passed him in the closing stages of the race. The British Grand Prix was particularly tricky for both Red Bull drivers, with Verstappen and Pérez making errors during qualifying that sent the latter out of Q1 and the former gaining floor damage. Verstappen, whose floor was replaced following qualifying, finished in second after making his way up the field while Pérez finished in seventeenth. The Hungarian Grand Prix was not any better, with Verstappen struggling with the car's handling and pace while Pérez crashed out of Q1 for the second consecutive race in a row. While Pérez recovered to seventh, Verstappen finished in fifth after colliding with Lewis Hamilton, dropping him behind Charles Leclerc. The Belgian Grand Prix saw Verstappen, who set the fastest time in qualifying, take a grid penalty. Teammate Pérez, who set the second-fastest time in qualifying, started on the front row for the first time since the Chinese Grand Prix. However, during the race, Pérez dropped down from second to finish in seventh, while Verstappen, who started eleventh, finished in fourth (following the disqualification of George Russell).

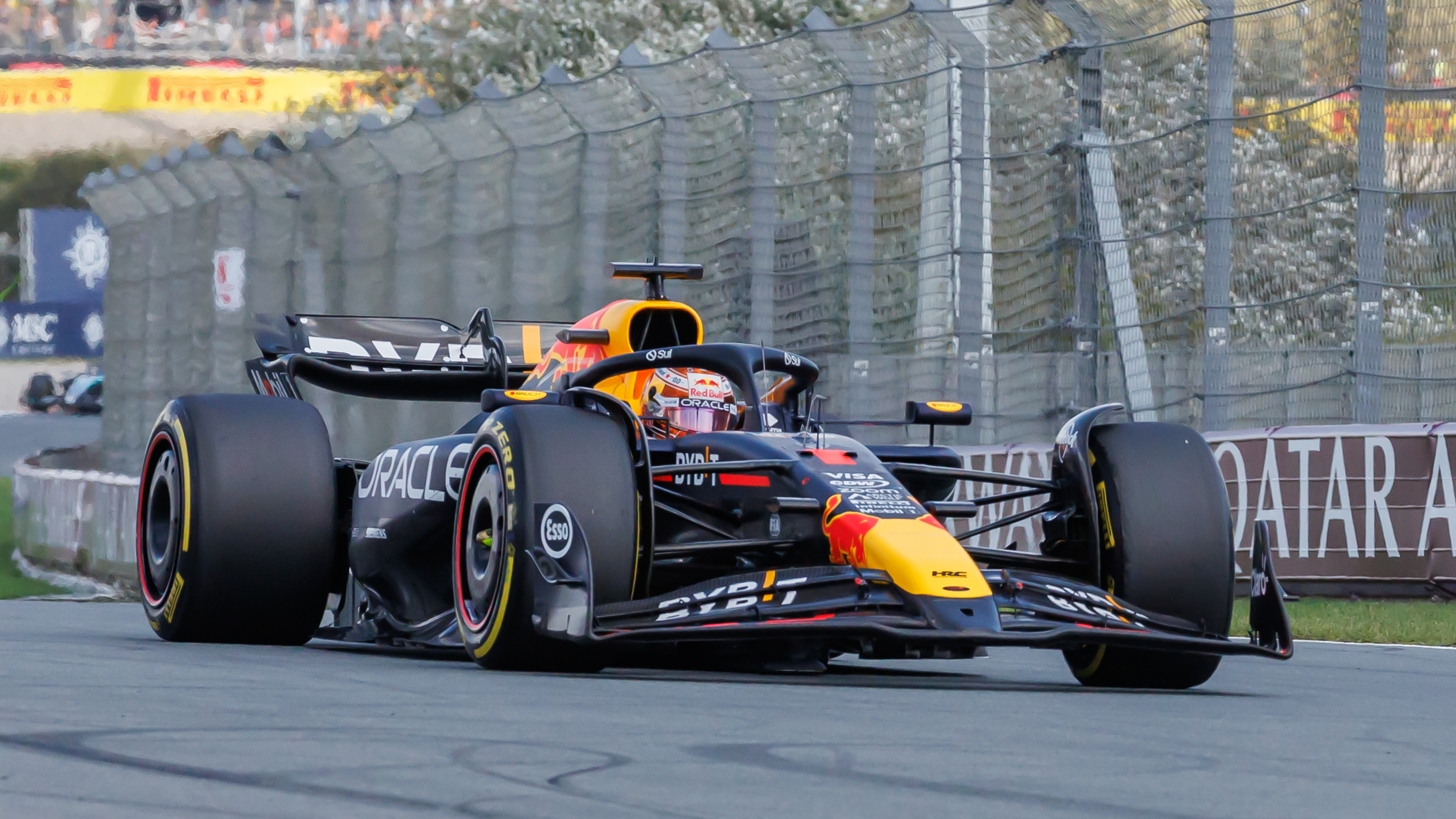
Verstappen during the Dutch Grand Prix

The Dutch Grand Prix saw Verstappen take the second-fastest time in qualifying. He briefly took the lead after Norris had a poor start, but the McLaren driver showed consistent pace behind his rival. On lap 18, Norris took the lead and extended the gap to Verstappen by over 22 seconds as he took the win; for comparison, Verstappen, while in the lead, could only muster a gap that was under 1.5 seconds to Norris, and he suffered issues with turning the car.

The Italian Grand Prix saw both Red Bulls qualify seventh and eighth for Verstappen and Pérez respectively. Pérez finished where he started in eighth while Verstappen made up one place to finish sixth, but ended up 37 seconds behind race winner Charles Leclerc.

=== Closing rounds: Fending off rivals and drivers' championship victory ===
The Azerbaijan Grand Prix saw Pérez, who qualified fourth, outqualify Verstappen for the first time this season; Verstappen started sixth. Pérez was in the fight for a podium the whole race until he collided with Sainz, taking both out of the race at the very end. Verstappen's title rival Norris worked his way up from a lowly sixteenth on the grid to overtake him for fourth during the race's closing stages. McLaren's large points haul in this Grand Prix enabled them to surge ahead of Red Bull in the Constructor's Championship for the first time. The RB20 was expected to struggle at the Singapore Grand Prix, given its issues with kerb-riding. However, set-up changes during practice drastically improved the car's driveability, enabling Verstappen to qualify and finish second, although he still finished over twenty seconds behind race winner Norris. Perez struggled for pace relative to his teammate, finishing only tenth.

Following a four-week break, Red Bull introduced an upgrade package at the United States Grand Prix to reverse their recent slump in the pecking order. Verstappen reaped the benefits of the upgrades to qualify on pole for the sprint. He converted this advantage into a sprint victory after holding off Norris and the charging Ferrari drivers. However, the RB20 struggled for race pace during the main race, as Verstappen found himself outpaced by both Ferrari drivers and Norris. Norris overtook Verstappen on lap 52, but was subsequently penalised for overtaking off the track, promoting Verstappen to the podium. Perez only managed to finish seventh, and lost out to George Russell despite the latter starting from the pit-lane.

Red Bull endured a miserable weekend in Mexico, as Verstappen endured multiple power unit issues during free practice, reporting a "weird noise" coming from the engine. Perez was knocked out of Q1 in his home race, and his race was hardly better, finishing seventeenth and last of the classified drivers after picking up a ten-second penalty for starting outside of his grid box. Verstappen qualified second, and took the lead from polesitter Sainz on the opening lap. However, Verstappen picked up twenty seconds' worth of penalties for twice running Norris off the track on lap 10. Verstappen struggled for race pace and was only able to recover to sixth. With Ferrari drivers Sainz and Leclerc finishing 1st and 3rd respectively, Red Bull dropped to third in the Constructor's Championship behind McLaren and Ferrari.

Before the São Paulo Grand Prix, Red Bull opted to change Verstappen's ICE, resulting in an automatic five-place grid penalty for the main race. The RB20 demonstrated strong race pace at the São Paulo Grand Prix sprint, with Verstappen finishing third on the road just behind the two McLarens, while Perez climbed up to eighth from a lowly thirteenth on the grid. However, Verstappen was penalised five seconds for a VSC infringement, demoting him to fourth behind Leclerc. Both drivers were knocked out in Q2 after the Aston Martin of Lance Stroll crashed late into the session, preventing Verstappen and Perez from attempting another fast lap. Verstappen's twelfth place classification in qualifying meant he would start seventeenth after his five-place grid penalty was applied, while title rival Norris qualified on pole. In tricky conditions, Verstappen would scythe through the field to win against the odds in the main race, marking his and the RB20's first victory since the Spanish Grand Prix. Perez would have a much tougher time in this Grand Prix as he spun on the opening lap and finished eleventh, outside the points-paying positions.

At the Las Vegas Grand Prix, the RB20 struggled to match the straight-line speed of its rivals as the team did not design a low-downforce rear wing spec ideal for the circuit configuration. This meant Verstappen only qualified fifth for the main race, while Perez was knocked out in Q1. Verstappen climbed up to second in the race's opening stint after passing Leclerc and Sainz, who both experienced severe tyre graining. Verstappen struggled for race pace on the hard tyre in the second and third stints and was overtaken by Hamilton, Sainz and Leclerc before the end of the race. However, as Verstappen finished ahead of Lando Norris, he mathematically secured the 2024 World Driver's championship with two races to spare. Perez recovered to tenth in a drive that included a double overtake on Liam Lawson and Kevin Magnussen on lap 38.

The RB20 was initially uncompetitive around Lusail International Circuit at the Qatar Grand Prix. Verstappen qualified only 6th in sprint qualifying, while Perez would start from the pit lane after being knocked out in SQ1. Verstappen lost three places at the start of the sprint race, while Perez spent the entirety of the race in 20th, pitting mid-race to replace his front-wing. Verstappen overtook Pierre Gasly for 8th during the sprint, but he was unable to catch Nico Hulkenberg in 7th, citing struggles with oversteer. In the 3 hours between the sprint and qualifying sessions, Red Bull tweaked their set-up, resulting in a significantly improved balance in the RB20 that enabled Verstappen to set the fastest time in Q3. This would have been Verstappen and the RB20's first pole since the Austrian Grand Prix but for a one-place grid penalty for driving too slow in a cooldown lap. Nevertheless, Verstappen took the lead from polesitter George Russell at turn 1, while Perez overtook Hamilton for 7th. Both drivers held their positions until a safety car was called out due to debris on track. However, Perez spun out during the safety car restart, causing a clutch failure and forcing him to retire from the race. Verstappen held onto the lead for the rest of the race to claim his 9th victory of the season, but despite this, Red Bull fell out of contention for the World Constructor's Championship with one race to go.

At the season finale in Abu Dhabi, the RB20 struggled with balance throughout the practice and qualifying sessions, with Verstappen qualifying only fifth after sliding on the exit of the final corner in Q3. Verstappen was later promoted to fourth on the grid after Hulkenberg was given a grid penalty for illegally overtaking two cars on the pit exit road. Both Red Bull drivers had a disastrous opening lap, with Verstappen dropping to eleventh after colliding with Oscar Piastri at turn 1, while Perez collided with Valtteri Bottas at turn 6, after which he lost drive and retired from the race. Verstappen was given a 10-second penalty for his opening lap collision, and only recovered to sixth as the RB20 once again exhibited poor race pace.

== Characteristics ==
While initially dominant, the RB20 was quickly challenged by rival constructors McLaren, Ferrari and Mercedes. One of the main issues Red Bull has tried to fix is a balance issue which leads to understeer, which was most apparent during the Hungarian and Dutch Grands Prix. Additionally, the RB20 struggled with kerb-riding, which was particularly apparent at the Monaco Grand Prix.

During the Hungarian Grand Prix, Verstappen experienced understeer, complaining to team radio that despite having a -5 setting on his brake bias, the car continued to exhibit understeer. After the race, Verstappen suggested that the car's pace had now fallen behind McLaren's MCL38. Team principal Horner acknowledged after the Italian Grand Prix that Red Bull had a balance issue that caused a downwards trend in performance the team has since then attempted to fix. Following the Azerbaijan Grand Prix, where Red Bull lost the lead of the Constructors' Championship to McLaren, Horner revealed that said issues, which also coincided with a downwards slump in form for Pérez, stemmed from an upgrade to the RB19 introduced at the 2023 Spanish Grand Prix; the team began to focus their development on Verstappen's car over fixing any potential issues with their ultimately dominant 2023 car.

== Liveries ==
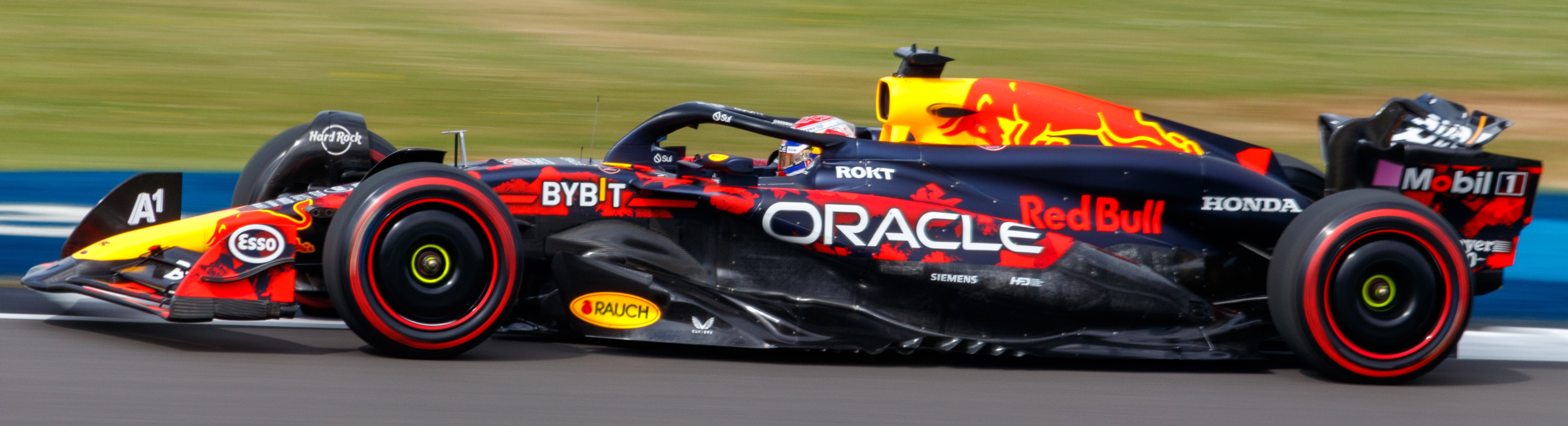
RB20 with the “Stallion Red” livery driven by Verstappen at Silverstone

In March 2024, Red Bull announced REBL CUSTMS, a fan design livery competition for the RB20. The winning designs would be used on the car at three races: the British, Singapore, and United States Grands Prix.

During the British Grand Prix, the team ran the first of the special liveries. The design was described as “Stallion Red” and was designed by Chalaj Suvanish from Thailand.

Before the Singapore Grand Prix, Red Bull announced that they would no longer be using the fan-designed livery for the Singapore and United States Grands Prix, citing weight issues as the reason.

== Complete Formula One results ==
Key

Key
Colour	Result
Gold	Winner
Silver	Second place
Bronze	Third place
Green	Other points position
Blue	Other classified position
Blue	Not classified, finished (NC)
Purple	Not classified, retired (Ret)
Red	Did not qualify (DNQ)
Black	Disqualified (DSQ)
White	Did not start (DNS)
White	Race cancelled (C)
Blank	Did not practice (DNP)
Blank	Excluded (EX)
Blank	Did not arrive (DNA)
Blank	Withdrawn (WD)
Blank	Did not enter (empty cell)
Annotation	Meaning
P	Pole position
F	Fastest lap
Superscript number	Points-scoring position in sprint

Year	Entrant	Power unit	Tyres	Driver name	Grands Prix																								Points	WCC pos.
Year	Entrant	Power unit	Tyres	Driver name	BHR	SAU	AUS	JPN	CHN	MIA	EMI	MON	CAN	ESP	AUT	GBR	HUN	BEL	NED	ITA	AZE	SIN	USA	MXC	SAP	LVG	QAT	ABU	Points	WCC pos.
2024	Red Bull Racing	Honda RBPTH002	P	(Netherlands) Max Verstappen	1^{P}^{F}	1^{P}	Ret^{P}	1^{P}^{F}	1^{1 P}	2^{1 P}	1^{P}	6	1	1	5^{1 P}	2	5	4	2	6	5	2	3^{1}	6	1^{4 F}	5	1^{8}	6	589	3rd
2024	Red Bull Racing	Honda RBPTH002	P	(Mexico) Sergio Pérez	2	2	5	2	3^{3}	4^{3}	8	Ret	Ret	8	7^{8}	17	7	7^{F}	6	8	17†	10	7	17	11^{8}	10	Ret	Ret	589	3rd
