= Red Bull Racing RB18 =

2022 Formula One racing car by Red Bull Racing

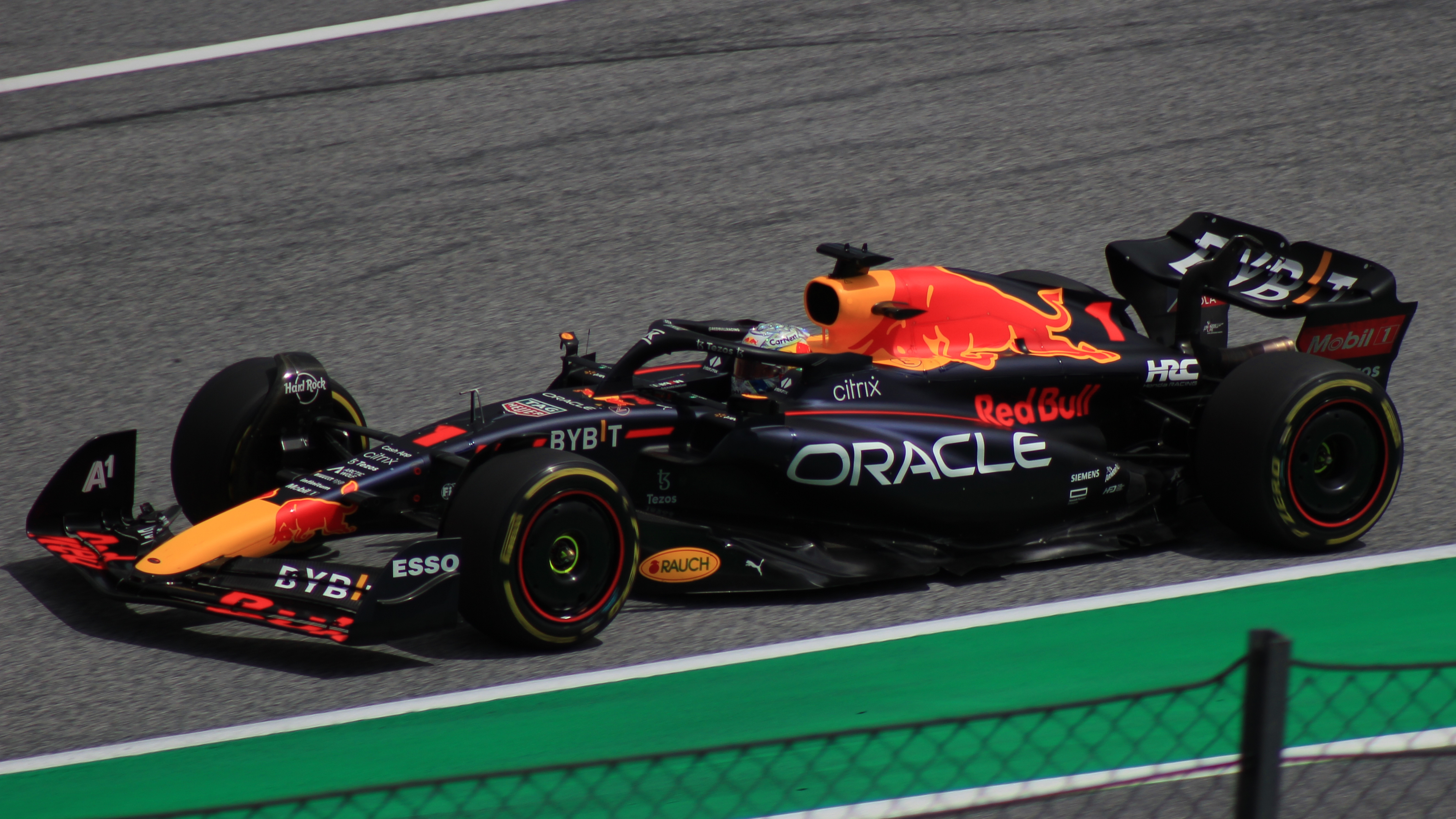
- An RB18 driven by Max Verstappen at the Austrian Grand Prix
- Category: Formula One
- Constructor: Red Bull Racing (chassis); Honda Racing Corporation (power unit)
- Designers: Adrian Newey (Chief Technical Officer); Pierre Waché (Technical Director); Rob Marshall (Chief Engineering Officer); Paul Monaghan (Chief Engineer, Car Engineering); Dan Fallows (Chief Engineer, Aerodynamics); Guillaume Cattelani (Chief Engineer, Technology and Analysis Tools); Craig Skinner (Chief Designer); Steve Winstanley (Chief Designer, Composites and Structures); Edward Aveling (Chief Designer, Mechanical and Systems); Ben Waterhouse (Head of Performance Engineering); Enrico Balbo (Head of Aerodynamics); Toyoharu Tanabe (Power Unit Technical Director - Honda)
- Predecessor: Red Bull RB16B
- Successor: Red Bull RB19

Technical specifications
- Suspension (front): Multi-link pull-rod actuated dampers and anti-roll bar
- Suspension (rear): Double wishbone push-rod springs, dampers, and anti-roll bar
- Engine: Red Bull RBPTH001 1.6 L (98 cu in) direct injection V6 turbocharged engine limited to 15,000 rpm in a mid-mounted, rear-wheel drive layout
- Electric motor: Red Bull Powertrains Kinetic and thermal energy recovery systems
- Battery: Lithium-ion battery
- Weight: 798 kg (1,759 lbs)
- Tyres: Pirelli P Zero (Dry); Pirelli Cinturato (Wet)

Competition history
- Notable entrants: Oracle Red Bull Racing
- Notable drivers: 1. (Netherlands) Max Verstappen; 11. (Mexico) Sergio Pérez
- Debut: 2022 Bahrain Grand Prix
- First win: 2022 Saudi Arabian Grand Prix
- Last win: 2022 Abu Dhabi Grand Prix
- Last event: 2022 Abu Dhabi Grand Prix
Races	Wins	Podiums	Poles	F/Laps
22	17	28	8	8
- Constructors' Championships: 1 (2022)
- Drivers' Championships: 1 (2022, Max Verstappen)

The Red Bull Racing RB18 is a Formula One car designed and constructed by Red Bull Racing which competed in the 2022 Formula One World Championship. The RB18 was driven by defending world champion Max Verstappen and Sergio Pérez. Verstappen secured his second consecutive Drivers' Championship driving the RB18 and Red Bull secured their fifth Constructors' Championship, their first since 2013. The RB18 is one of Adrian Newey's most successful Formula One designs to date, behind its successor, the RB19, and also one of the most dominant Formula One cars ever built.

== Competition and development history ==
=== Opening rounds ===
The RB18 made its debut at the 2022 Bahrain Grand Prix, with drivers Max Verstappen (the defending World Champion) and Sergio Pérez qualifying 2nd and 4th respectively. In the early stages of the race, Verstappen suffered from overheating brakes, and after his second pitstop on lap 46, his steering column broke. On lap 54, Verstappen was forced to retire due to a fuel lock issue, and Pérez spun at turn 1 on the final lap due to the same issue. This marked Red Bull's first double retirement since the 2020 Austrian Grand Prix.

At the next race in Saudi Arabia, Pérez took his maiden pole position, with Verstappen qualifying 4th, confused about a "lack of grip". On lap 1, Verstappen was able to beat Carlos Sainz Jr. off the line to take 3rd place, while Pérez led the race from Charles Leclerc. During the opening stint, Pérez came under pressure from a potential undercut by Leclerc and pitted for the hard tyres. On the same lap, Nicholas Latifi crashed at the final turn, causing a safety car, allowing Leclerc, Verstappen and Sainz to get a cheap pitstop and gain track position over Pérez. After the restart, Leclerc seemed to be comfortably leading, but a virtual safety car from numerous retirements on lap 37 changed the dynamic of the race. Verstappen's tyres appeared to have warmed up better than Leclerc's, allowing him to close up and attempt to take the lead numerous times. Verstappen took the lead on lap 47, which he would keep to take his and the RB18's first win of the season. Pérez finished the race in 4th, unable to overtake Sainz.

The Australian Grand Prix proved to be a tricky affair for Red Bull, with Verstappen qualifying 2nd, 0.3 seconds behind polesitter Leclerc, while Pérez qualified 3rd. At the start, Verstappen squeezed Pérez, causing Pérez to lose a position to Lewis Hamilton in the Mercedes. Pérez eventually got past Hamilton on lap 9, but both Red Bull drivers began to struggle with graining in their front-left tyres. Verstappen began to rapidly lose time to leader Charles Leclerc, while Pérez started to once again fall into the clutches of Hamilton. Verstappen and Pérez pitted on lap 17 and lap 19 for hard tyres respectively. Pérez was briefly overcut by Lewis Hamilton, but he took advantage of Hamilton's underheated tyres to overtake him into turn 9. A safety car caused by Sebastian Vettel's crash allowed George Russell to take a cheap pitstop and jump Pérez. Fernando Alonso also stayed out on hard tyres, meaning Pérez was in fifth place. Pérez got past Alonso on lap 30 and then overtook Russell on lap 36 to take third. Verstappen suffered a fuel leak on lap 39 while running a comfortable second. This meant Pérez inherited second after Verstappen's retirement, albeit finishing over 20 seconds behind Leclerc.

Red Bull brought weight-saving upgrades for the RB18 for the Emilia Romagna Grand Prix. In a rain-affected qualifying session, Verstappen took his first pole position of the season, while Pérez qualified only 7th due to a couple of ill-timed red flags. Verstappen was beaten off the line by Leclerc at the start of the sprint, but through superior tyre management, he got past Leclerc on lap 20 of the sprint to win. Pérez made several crucial overtakes throughout the sprint to recover to 3rd place. At the start of the main race, Pérez overtook Leclerc for 2nd. Pérez held onto his position for the remainder of the race, while Verstappen secured a dominant victory, achieving the second grand slam of his career. This meant Red Bull achieved a 1-2 finish, their first since the 2016 2016 Malaysian Grand Prix.

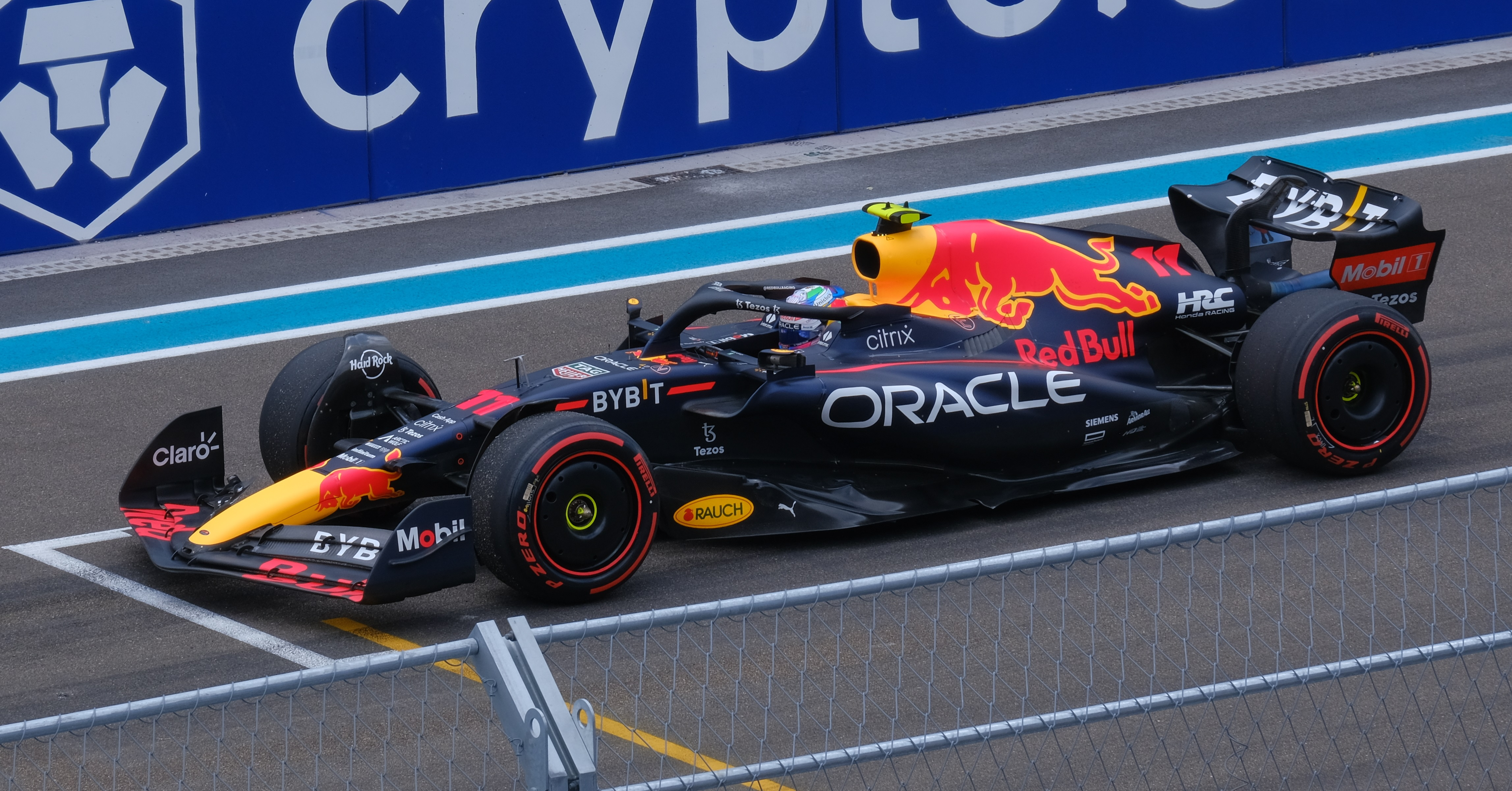
Pérez at the Miami Grand Prix

At Miami, Verstappen's car suffered from overheating and hydraulic issues in free practice, meaning Verstappen was left with little running before qualifying. Despite this, Verstappen qualified 3rd behind the two Ferraris of Leclerc and Sainz, while Pérez qualified 4th. Verstappen immediately overtook Sainz at the first corner to take 2nd, with Pérez maintaining 4th and putting pressure on Sainz for a podium position. On lap 10, Verstappen overtook Leclerc for the race lead. Pérez experienced a sensor issue on lap 20, losing time to Sainz on the straights. The issue was resolved on the following lap, but reports suggested he lost power as a result. On lap 41, a late safety car allowed Pérez to pit for fresh medium tyres, potentially offering better grip in the closing stages. Although Pérez constantly put pressure on Sainz on the restart, he was unable to pass him as his car's straight-line speed was compromised by his earlier sensor issue. Verstappen fended off Leclerc to take the victory, while Pérez finished the race in 4th.

=== European and Canadian rounds ===
Red Bull brought further upgrades to the RB18 in Spain, with more weight removed from the chassis. Verstappen and Pérez qualified 2nd and 5th respectively, with Verstappen suffering a DRS failure in his final Q3 run. Pérez overtook Sainz at the start to take 4th. A gust of wind caused Verstappen's car to slide into the gravel at turn 4, costing him positions to Russell and Pérez. Verstappen was soon let past by Pérez to challenge Russell for second, but intermittent DRS issues carried over from qualifying prevented him from overtaking. Verstappen pitted for medium tyres on lap 14, while Pérez stayed out longer to pit for medium tyres on lap 18. Race leader Leclerc retired from the race on lap 27, elevating Verstappen into 2nd behind Russell. Still unable to overtake, Verstappen pitted for soft tyres on lap 29. Pérez overtook Russell for the lead on lap 31, while Verstappen on fresh tyres rapidly closed the gap to both drivers. Pérez and Verstappen pitted for medium tyres on lap 37 and 44 respectively, with Verstappen overcutting Russell to take 2nd place. Verstappen rapidly closed up to Pérez, meaning Pérez yielded the lead to Verstappen following team orders. Pérez would later pit again for soft tyres, with which he used to set the fastest lap of the race. With Verstappen 1st and Pérez 2nd, Red Bull recorded their second 1-2 finish of the season. The result enabled Verstappen and Red Bull to take the lead in both the driver's and the Constructor's championships.

For much of the weekend in Monaco, the Red Bull RB18 was seemingly unable to match the cornering and traction of the Ferrari F1-75. As such, Pérez and Verstappen were only able to qualify on the second row, while Ferrari dominantly locked out the front row. However, rain on race day allowed Red Bull to strike back at Ferrari. As the track surface dried up, Red Bull brought Pérez in for intermediate tyres on lap 17, enabling him to undercut race leader Charles Leclerc. Verstappen pitted on lap 19 for intermediates as well. Pérez and Verstappen pitted on lap 22 for hard tyres, with Pérez overcutting Sainz to take the lead of the race, while Verstappen overcut Leclerc for 3rd. After a red flag caused by Mick Schumacher's crash, Pérez and Verstappen switched to medium tyres, with which they held positions to finish 1st and 3rd respectively. It was Pérez's first win of the season, while Red Bull and Verstappen simultaneously extended their leads in both championships.

At the Azerbaijan Grand Prix, the RB18 again had an advantage in top-end speed over Ferrari, but Leclerc took his fourth pole in a row ahead of Pérez and Verstappen in second and third respectively, with both drivers complaining about balance over one lap and the lack of a tow down Baku's 1.6km main straight. However, at the start of the Grand Prix, Pérez overtook Leclerc into the first corner to take the lead of the race, with Verstappen remaining third, and Sainz's Ferrari fourth. The running order for the top four remained unchanged until lap 9 when Sainz retired from the race. During the ensuing VSC, Leclerc pitted for new hard tyres, while Pérez and Verstappen stayed out, the latter inheriting second due to Leclerc's stop. When racing resumed, Verstappen began to gain on Pérez, who was struggling with grip after the VSC, and on lap 15, overtook his teammate into turn 1, with the team telling Pérez not to fight back. Verstappen pulled out a three-second lead over his teammate before both made their pitstops, with Pérez pitting for new hards on lap 17, and Verstappen coming in for the same tyre two laps later, allowing Leclerc to retake the lead. However, on lap 20, Leclerc's engine blew, and he was forced to retire for the second time in three races, leaving Red Bull with an easy 1-2 running order. Red Bull instructed both drivers to manage their pace, and both stopped again for new hards on lap 34 during the VSC period caused by Magnussen's retirement. When racing resumed, Pérez set the fastest lap of the race, after which both drivers managed their tyres to the end of the race. Verstappen and Pérez gave Red Bull their third 1-2 finish in five races, with Verstappen and Pérez taking their fifth win and podium of the season respectively. Verstappen extended his lead in the championship to 21 points over Pérez, who had moved into second in the championship, and 34 over Leclerc, while Red Bull extended its lead in the Constructors' Championship to 80 points over nearest rival Ferrari.

In Canada, the RB18 took its third pole of the season with Verstappen outqualifying second-placed Fernando Alonso by .645 seconds in a mixed wet/dry session. Pérez crashed out in Q2, forcing him to start from 13th on the grid. On lap 9, Pérez retired with a reported gearbox issue, bringing out the VSC. Verstappen went on to claim victory after defending against the Ferrari of Carlos Sainz in the final stint.

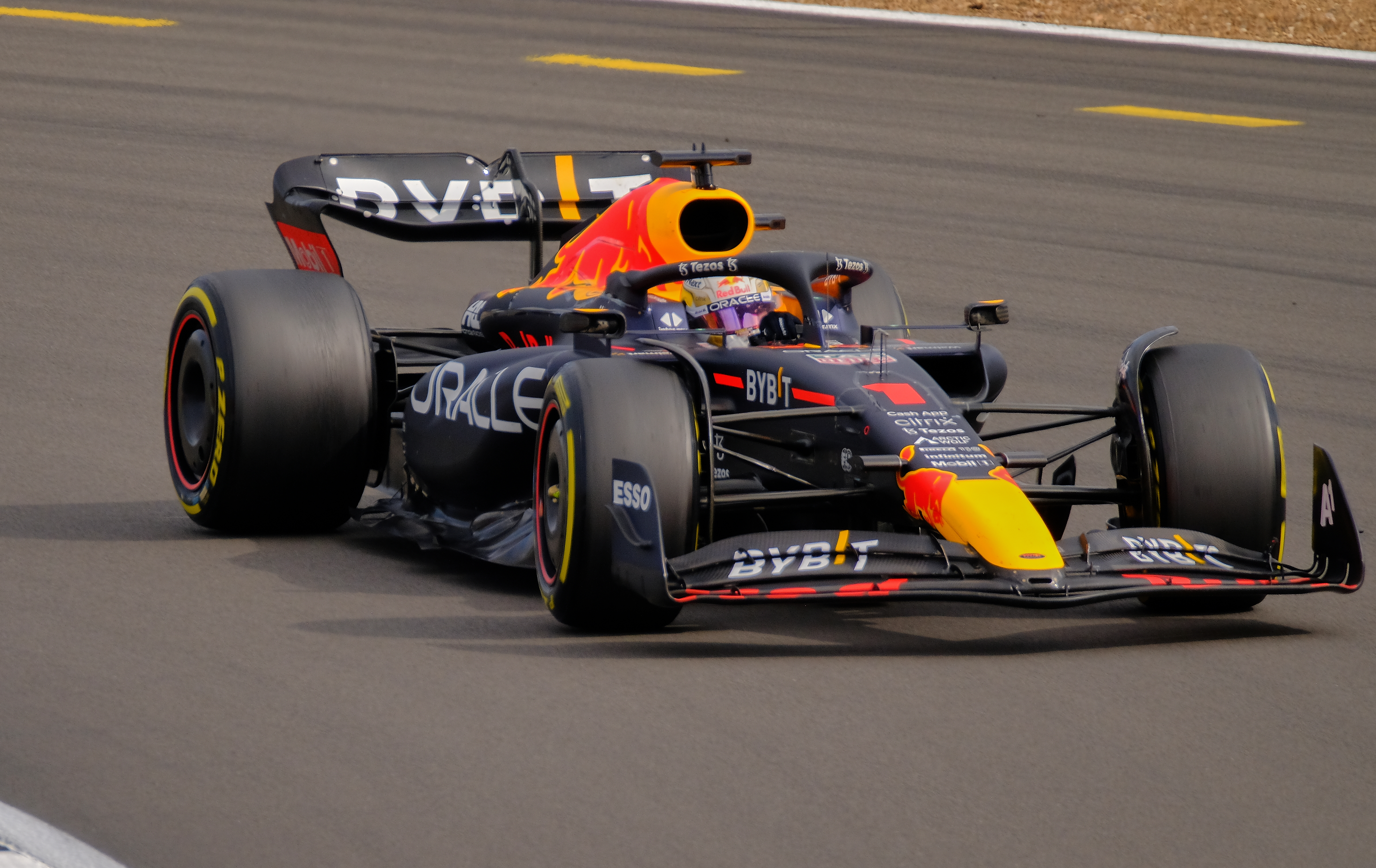
Verstappen at the British Grand Prix

Heading into the British Grand Prix, Red Bull upgraded their car by altering the appearance of the engine cover bodywork. In free practice, the Red Bulls appeared to have the advantage over their opposition. However, qualifying took place in wet conditions, erasing the apparent advantage. Verstappen and Pérez qualified 2nd and 4th, with Verstappen being hampered on his final Q3 run by a yellow flag caused by Leclerc spinning. Verstappen took the lead from Sainz at the start, while Pérez dropped back to 6th. Following a collision involving Guanyu Zhou, George Russell and Pierre Gasly, the race was red-flagged. Race control ruled that the cars would restart in their original grid positions, demoting Verstappen to 2nd and promoting Pérez to 4th at the race restart. Verstappen stayed in 2nd on the restart, while Pérez was forced to pit for damage after colliding with Charles Leclerc. On lap 10, Carlos Sainz ran wide at Copse, enabling Verstappen to take the lead. This lead was short-lived, however, as on lap 12, Verstappen picked up floor damage as he ran over debris originating from Pierre Gasly's car, significantly reducing his pace, forcing him to pit. Verstappen emerged from the pitlane in 6th and due to his damage, began to rapidly lose time to the leaders. Verstappen later pitted for hard tyres and emerged 8th, behind Pérez and Sebastian Vettel, and was later passed by Esteban Ocon. However, Ocon's retirement on lap 42 allowed Verstappen to salvage his race somewhat, as he pitted for fresh softs and emerged in 9th for the safety car restart. Pérez was 4th at the safety car restart, and immediately took 3rd from Lewis Hamilton. Verstappen overtook Kevin Magnussen and Sebastian Vettel to take 7th. Pérez finished 2nd after emerging on top in a three-way duel between himself, Hamilton and Leclerc. Verstappen finished the race in 7th, successfully defending against the Haas of Mick Schumacher. Despite setbacks in the race, Verstappen and Red Bull remained at the top of both championships.

The Red Bull achieved its fourth pole position of the season with Verstappen in Austria, edging out Charles Leclerc by a mere 0.029 seconds. Pérez initially qualified fourth but was later demoted to 13th after stewards determined he exceeded track limits in Q2. Verstappen took advantage of the two Ferraris behind him squabbling to take the sprint win, while Pérez was able to recover to 5th. On race day, Verstappen kept the lead from pole, while Pérez spun into the gravel at turn 4 after making contact with George Russell, suffering sidepod damage, which eventually forced him to retire from the race. To make matters worse for Red Bull, Verstappen began experiencing significant tyre degradation issues, enabling Leclerc to pressure him for the lead. On lap 12, Leclerc finally found a way past Verstappen, and he began to extend his lead on the following lap. On lap 13, Verstappen attempted the undercut using the hard tyres, emerging 9th, forcing him to scythe his way through traffic. Verstappen eventually passed Lewis Hamilton for P3 on lap 18. Verstappen re-took the lead after Leclerc pitted on lap 27. However, Leclerc proved to be significantly quicker than Verstappen with fresher tyres, making short work of Verstappen to take the lead on lap 33. Soon, the Ferrari of Carlos Sainz also began to pressure Verstappen for 2nd place, but Verstappen pitted on lap 37 to attempt another undercut. When Leclerc pitted on lap 51, Verstappen once again took the lead, but the Ferrari held superior traction, and with a strong exit from turn 4, passed Verstappen for the third time in the race. Carlos Sainz also began pressuring Verstappen before his untimely retirement on lap 58, bringing out the VSC, and enabling Verstappen to make a cheap pitstop for medium tyres. In the closing laps, Leclerc appeared to pick up a throttle issue, allowing Verstappen to reel Leclerc in. However, Verstappen ran out of laps to pass Leclerc, meaning he finished the race in P2. Verstappen and Red Bull maintained their positions at the top of both championships. Pérez was demoted to 3rd in the championship after his retirement and Leclerc's victory.

Red Bull utilized a low downforce setup at the French Grand Prix, in contrast to Ferrari’s high downforce configuration. This enabled Red Bull to have a significant edge on the straights, but this also cost them time going into each corner. As such, Leclerc took pole by a comfortable 3 tenths (albeit with the help of a tow from his teammate), while Verstappen and Pérez qualified 2nd and 3rd on the grid. As the lights went out, Perez was immediately beaten off the line by Lewis Hamilton, with Verstappen unable to find a way past Leclerc in the opening stint. Pérez began to drop back from Hamilton as the first stint progressed. On lap 15, Verstappen pitted for the hard tyres to attempt an undercut on Leclerc. However, on lap 17, Leclerc’s car spun and crashed into the barriers at turn 11, leading to a safety car period. This promoted Verstappen and Pérez to 1st and 3rd respectively. At the restart, Verstappen easily pulled away from the rest of the field and coasted to victory, but Pérez seemed to struggle with race pace, getting overtaken by Sainz and pressured by George Russell. Pérez moved back to 3rd after Sainz pitted for fresh softs, but he lost the podium after getting outfoxed on a VSC restart by Russell. Verstappen won the race by over 10 seconds from Hamilton, with Pérez fourth, unable to re-pass Russell for 3rd.

At the Belgian GP, Verstappen took engine penalties and started 14th. During the race he had a flying first lap, jumping all the way to 8th on his soft compound tyres, while Leclerc (who had also taken engine penalties and started 15th) was up to 10th by the end of lap 1. Following a safety car, the race restarted on lap 5, and Verstappen jumped to seventh at the expense of Alex Albon and took sixth from Daniel Ricciardo at the final chicane. Verstappen demonstrated strong pace, overtaking Vettel at the final chicane on lap 6, then Alonso with DRS on lap 7. Sainz meanwhile held a two-second lead over Pérez. On lap 12, Sainz pitted for fresh rubber, and on the same lap, Verstappen passed Pérez for the lead of the race. Pérez pitted on lap 14 for medium tyres, while Verstappen pitted one lap later for the same tyres. Verstappen emerged from the pits around 4 seconds behind Sainz and quickly reeled him in to take the lead on lap 18. Pérez later passed Sainz for 2nd place on lap 21. With a margin of victory of 17.841s, Verstappen led a resounding Red Bull one-two while Sainz held on for third.

== Complete Formula One results ==
Key

Key
Colour	Result
Gold	Winner
Silver	Second place
Bronze	Third place
Green	Other points position
Blue	Other classified position
Blue	Not classified, finished (NC)
Purple	Not classified, retired (Ret)
Red	Did not qualify (DNQ)
Black	Disqualified (DSQ)
White	Did not start (DNS)
White	Race cancelled (C)
Blank	Did not practice (DNP)
Blank	Excluded (EX)
Blank	Did not arrive (DNA)
Blank	Withdrawn (WD)
Blank	Did not enter (empty cell)
Annotation	Meaning
P	Pole position
F	Fastest lap
Superscript number	Points-scoring position in sprint

Year	Entrant	Power unit	Tyres	Driver name	Grands Prix																						Points	WCC pos.
Year	Entrant	Power unit	Tyres	Driver name	BHR	SAU	AUS	EMI	MIA	ESP	MON	AZE	CAN	GBR	AUT	FRA	HUN	BEL	NED	ITA	SIN	JPN	USA	MXC	SAP	ABU	Points	WCC pos.
2022	Oracle Red Bull Racing	Red Bull RBPTH001	P	(Mexico) Sergio Pérez	18†	4^{P}	2	2^{3}	4	2^{F}	1	2^{F}	Ret	2	Ret^{5}	4	5	2	5	6^{F}	1	2	4	3	7^{5}	3	759	1st
2022	Oracle Red Bull Racing	Red Bull RBPTH001	P	(Netherlands) Max Verstappen	19†	1	Ret	1^{P 1 F}	1^{F}	1	3	1	1^{P}	7	2^{P 1 F}	1	1	1^{F}	1^{P}^{F}	1	7	1^{P}	1	1^{P}	6^{4}	1^{P}	759	1st

† – Driver failed to finish the race, but was classified as they had completed over 90% of the winner's race distance.

Awards
Preceded by Red Bull Racing RB16B	Autosport; Racing Car of the Year	Succeeded by Red Bull Racing RB19
