= Red Bull Racing RB19 =

Formula One racing car

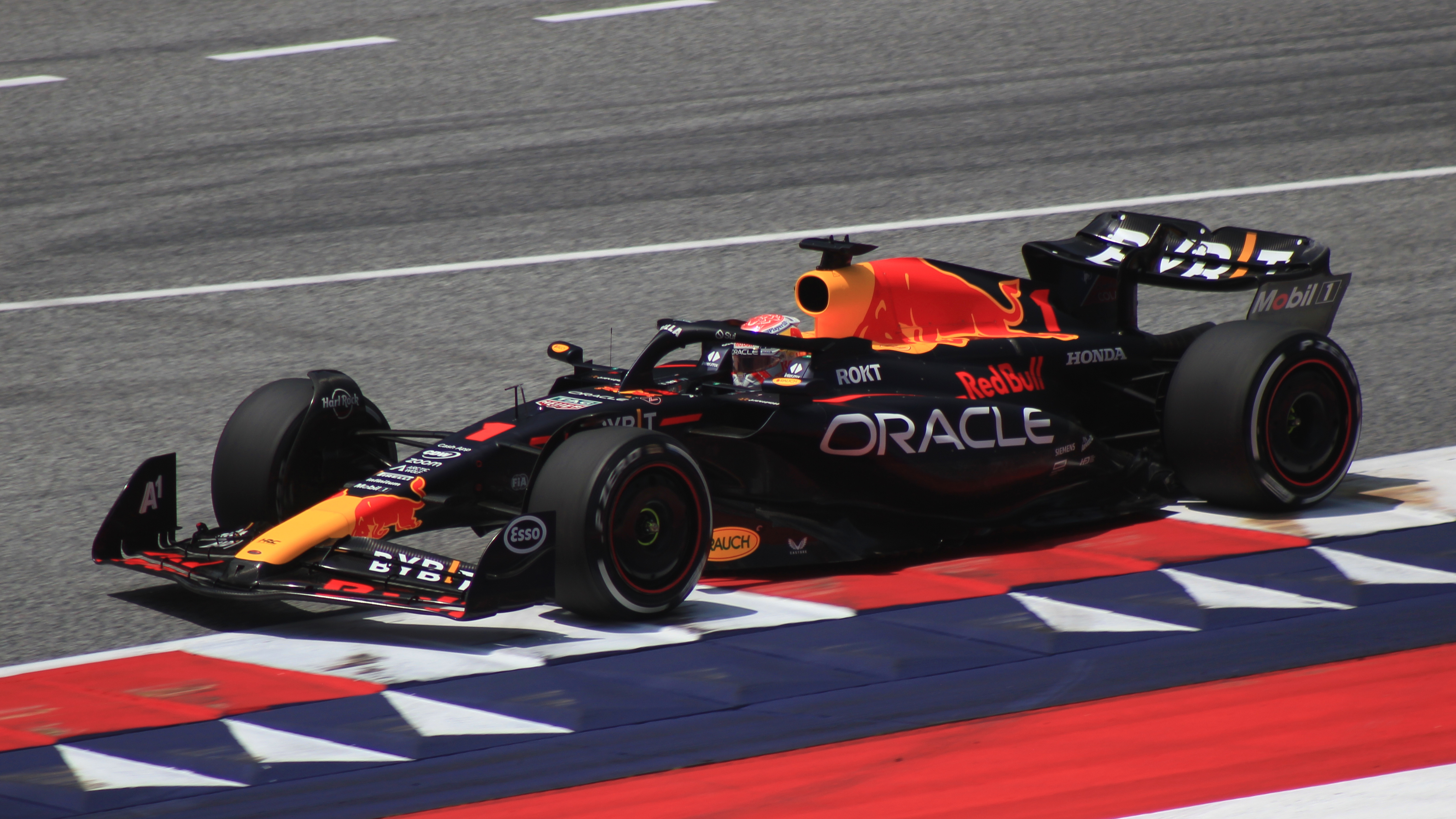
- Max Verstappen driving an RB19 during the Austrian Grand Prix.
- Category: Formula One
- Constructor: Red Bull Racing (chassis); Honda Racing Corporation (power unit)
- Designers: Adrian Newey (Chief Technical Officer); Pierre Waché (Technical Director); Rob Marshall (Chief Engineering Officer); Paul Monaghan (Chief Engineer, Car Engineering); Guillaume Cattelani (Chief Engineer, Technology and Analysis Tools); Craig Skinner (Chief Designer); Steve Winstanley (Chief Designer, Composites and Structures); Edward Aveling (Chief Designer, Mechanical and Systems); Ben Waterhouse (Head of Performance Engineering); Alistair Brizell (Head of Performance Analysis); Enrico Balbo (Head of Aerodynamics); Toyoharu Tanabe (Power Unit Technical Director - Honda)
- Predecessor: Red Bull RB18
- Successor: Red Bull RB20

Technical specifications
- Suspension (front): Multi-link pull-rod actuated dampers and anti-roll bar
- Suspension (rear): Double wishbone push-rod springs, dampers, and anti-roll bar
- Engine: Honda RBPTH001 1.6 L (98 cu in) direct injection V6 turbocharged engine limited to 15,000 rpm in a rear mid-mounted, rear-wheel-drive layout
- Electric motor: Honda Kinetic and thermal energy recovery systems
- Battery: Honda Lithium-ion battery
- Power: 1,040 hp (775 kW)
- Weight: 798 kg (1,759 lbs)
- Fuel: Mobil Synergy
- Lubricants: Mobil 1
- Tyres: Pirelli P Zero (Dry); Pirelli Cinturato (Wet)

Competition history
- Notable entrants: Oracle Red Bull Racing
- Notable drivers: 1. (Netherlands) Max Verstappen; 11. (Mexico) Sergio Pérez
- Debut: 2023 Bahrain Grand Prix
- First win: 2023 Bahrain Grand Prix
- Last win: 2023 Abu Dhabi Grand Prix
- Last event: 2023 Abu Dhabi Grand Prix
Races	Wins	Podiums	Poles	F/Laps
22	21	30	14	11
- Constructors' Championships: 1 (2023)
- Drivers' Championships: 1 (2023, Max Verstappen)

The Red Bull Racing RB19 is a championship-winning Formula One car designed and constructed by Red Bull Racing and powered by the Honda RBPTH001 power unit which competed in the 2023 Formula One World Championship. The car was unveiled in New York City on 3 February 2023. The RB19 was driven by defending world champion Max Verstappen and Sergio Pérez. The car also marked the return of Honda as a named engine supplier to Red Bull Racing and AlphaTauri, with both teams' engines badged as Honda RBPT.

The RB19 is one of the most dominant cars in the history of the Formula One World Championship, winning 21 out of the 22 races (95.45%) it competed in, thereby outperforming the McLaren MP4/4's previous record of winning 15 out of 16 races (93.8%) that had stood since the 1988 F1 season. It has the second highest percentage of laps led in a season at 86.7% (1,149 out of 1,325), behind the MP4/4's 97.3% (1,003 out of 1,031).

== Competitive history ==
During preseason testing in Sakhir at the Bahrain International Circuit, the car was immediately proven to be an improvement over its predecessor, the RB18, which was already dominant over its competitors. Pundits noted that the car looked stable, reliable and easy to drive, backed up by Red Bull topping the timesheets on both day 1 and day 3 of testing. When asked about where the car improved relative to its predecessor, reigning champion Max Verstappen stated that the car improved 'everywhere'.

=== Opening rounds ===
Despite encountering balance issues during free practice, the RB19 confirmed its pace at the opening round in Bahrain by comfortably locking out the front row with Verstappen on pole position and Pérez alongside him in second. Although Pérez was beaten off the line by Ferrari driver Charles Leclerc, Verstappen demonstrated the ominous race pace of the RB19 by pulling away from Leclerc at almost a second per lap during the opening stint. Pérez was ordered by his Red Bull engineer to stay behind Leclerc during the first stint to protect his tyres. Pérez stayed out until lap 17 where he pitted for the soft tyres. With Leclerc on slower hard tyres, Pérez quickly caught Leclerc and by lap 25 he managed to overtake Leclerc for second place. Mid-race, Verstappen reported some issues with his downshifts, but this didn't seem to hinder his pace. Verstappen crossed the line to comfortably win in Bahrain, and Perez finished second to make it a Red Bull 1-2, with Verstappen finishing nearly 40 seconds ahead of third-place finisher Fernando Alonso.

Red Bull looked set to dominate in Saudi Arabia, with Verstappen and Pérez taking turns topping the timings in the three practice sessions allocated. However, during Q2, Verstappen encountered a driveshaft issue on his first flying lap, forcing him to abandon the rest of the session, and as a result, he wound up only fifteenth on the starting grid. Pérez took advantage of Verstappen's misfortune to take pole position for only the second time in his career. Pérez was passed by Fernando Alonso as the lights went out, but he successfully re-took first place on lap 4. From fifteenth on the grid, Verstappen overtook the cars ahead of him one by one, taking advantage of a safety car to make a pitstop, meaning he was running fourth at the restart. After the restart, he passed George Russell and Fernando Alonso in quick succession to take second on lap 25, with Pérez around five seconds ahead. Around lap 37, Verstappen reported on team radio that he sensed some high-pitched noises, implying that he was bound to suffer another driveshaft failure. However, both drivers were able to cross the line to complete a Red Bull 1-2, with Pérez victorious and Verstappen finishing runner-up, taking the fastest lap on the final lap. This was not without controversy, as Red Bull instructed both drivers via team radio to drive to a lap time delta of 1:33.0 during the closing stages.

The RB19 did not appear to handle anywhere near as smoothly in Australia, particularly in the hands of Sergio Pérez, who endured a torrid third practice session, ending up in the gravel traps frequently, suspecting brake issues on his car. This issue seemed to carry over into qualifying, where Pérez spun into the gravel at turn 3 during his first flying lap in Q1. As a result, this meant Pérez would start at the back of the grid. Meanwhile, Verstappen comfortably secured pole position despite further complaints about his gearbox's downshifts and a potential issue with his car's battery. As a precaution, Red Bull replaced a raft of components on Pérez's car, resulting in a pit lane start. Verstappen was overtaken by Mercedes drivers George Russell and Lewis Hamilton on lap 1. Pérez gradually climbed up the order until on lap 7 Alexander Albon crashed his Williams at turn 7, bringing out a safety car, which led Russell to pit for hard tyres, while Verstappen and Hamilton stayed out. On the next lap, a red flag was brought out, eliminating Russell as a threat for the race win as all drivers were able to change their tyres without any time loss, with Verstappen and Perez opting for another set of hard tyres. Verstappen remained in second at the restart, with Pérez dropping to fifteenth at the restart. On lap 13, Verstappen breezed past Hamilton to reclaim the lead of the race. After the restart, Pérez once again made progress up the order, climbing up to seventh by lap 53 before Kevin Magnussen crashed into the wall at turn 2, bringing out another red flag. At the next restart, Verstappen kept his lead into turn 1, but several incidents lower down the order hampered Pérez's progress, where he dropped to tenth position. A red flag was signalled before any driver completed the first sector, meaning that the cars would restart in the order they were before the second restart. As there was only one lap remaining, the drivers finished the race behind the safety car. Verstappen crossed the line to win in Australia, while Pérez benefitted from Gasly's retirement and Sainz's penalty at the second restart to take fifth.

=== Mid-season rounds ===
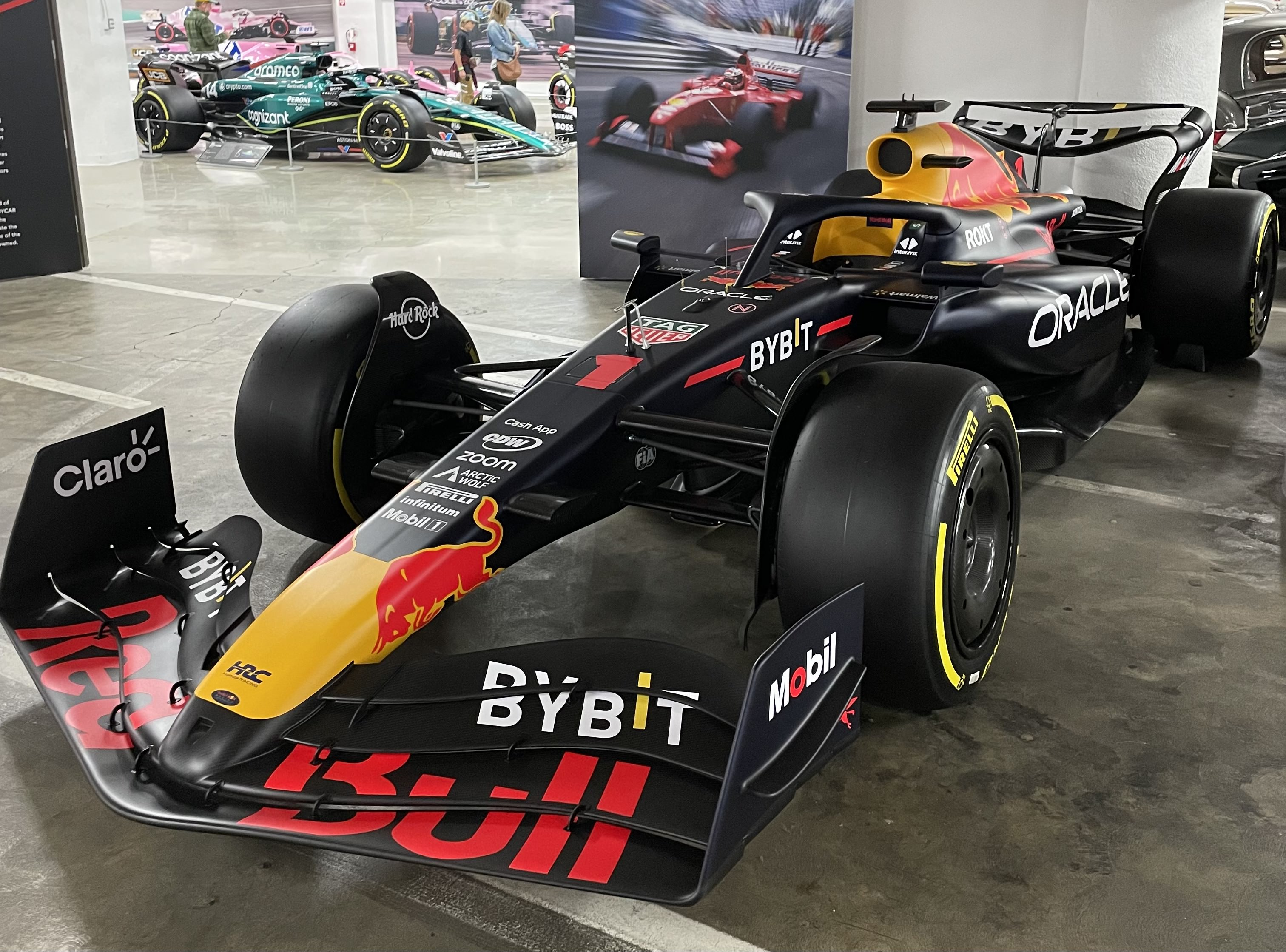
RB19 show-car at the Petersen Automotive Museum in Los Angeles, 2025

Over the four-week break before the next race in Azerbaijan, Red Bull designed an upgrade package for the RB19, with modifications centring around the car's sidepods; the shape of the inlet and the underbite was altered to improve airflow to the ancillaries, coolers and radiators.

The Azerbaijan Grand Prix, which was dubbed a 'sprint weekend' due to its unique format, saw Red Bull beaten in qualifying for the first time, with Charles Leclerc grabbing pole position on Friday for the main race, with Verstappen and Perez qualifying second and third respectively. This feat was repeated on Saturday sprint qualifying, with Pérez instead qualifying on the front row, and Verstappen in third. At the start of the sprint race, Verstappen tangled with George Russell, causing significant damage to his sidepod. Red Bull team principal Christian Horner suggested this damage cost him 'three-quarters of a second of a lap'. As a result, Verstappen lost third to Russell. A virtual safety car was brought out due to debris from the Alphatauri of Yuki Tsunoda, who hit the wall at turn 13. On lap 5, the race restarted, with Verstappen immediately passing Russell to take back third place. On lap 7, Pérez used DRS to pass Leclerc for the lead on the main straight, after which he streaked ahead into a comfortable lead. Verstappen spent the rest of the sprint race trying to pass Leclerc unsuccessfully. Pérez went on to win the sprint race, while Verstappen finished third despite suffering significant damage. In the opening stint of the main race, both Verstappen and Pérez passed polesitter Leclerc on the main straight with ease on lap 3 and lap 6 respectively. Pérez generally remained within DRS range of Verstappen in the first ten laps, before a safety car was called out due to Nyck De Vries clipping the wall at turn 5, but not before Verstappen made a pitstop for hard tyres. This allowed Pérez and Leclerc to pit for new tires without losing much time, relegating Verstappen to third. At the restart, Verstappen made short work of Leclerc to reclaim second, while Pérez took advantage of the squabbling behind to build a small gap to Verstappen. Pérez remained in the lead for the rest of the race to take the win, with Verstappen finishing second to complete the third Red Bull 1-2 of the season.

The effects of the RB19's upgrade would be more pronounced in Miami, with Verstappen topping the second and third free practices. In qualifying, Pérez comfortably secured pole position, although Verstappen qualified only ninth due to an ill-timed red flag caused by Charles Leclerc crashing at turn 5. Pérez, starting on medium tyres along with the other frontrunners, maintained first place into turn 1, while Verstappen on hard tyres gradually made up positions as the first stint progressed, making a double overtake on Kevin Magnussen and Charles Leclerc into turn 1 on lap 4 for sixth place, before passing George Russell, Pierre Gasly, Carlos Sainz and Fernando Alonso in succession to rise up to second place by lap 15. Pérez, who was around three seconds ahead of Verstappen at this moment, pitted for fresh hard tyres as his medium tyres began to lose performance. However, despite this, Verstappen lost little time to Pérez as he extended his stint on hard tyres to 46 laps, emerging only around 1.5 seconds behind Pérez when he pitted for new medium tyres. As such, Verstappen made use of his fresher tyres to overtake Pérez for the lead on lap 47. The order remained the same for the rest of the race, resulting in another one-two finish for Red Bull.

The Monaco Grand Prix marked differing fortunes for the RB19's drivers; while Verstappen topped all but the first practice session and just barely took pole position ahead of Fernando Alonso and Esteban Ocon, Pérez' qualifying was brought to a halt after crashing out of the opening St. Devote corner, a similar fate which had befouled him in the previous year's Monaco race and Australia earlier in the season. Starting from last on the grid, Pérez was only able to make up only four positions (including the retirements of Lance Stroll and Kevin Magnussen) and was further hindered by an accident between him and George Russell as rain started to trickle onto the Circuit de Monaco, and by the end of the race, was two laps down on teammate Verstappen, who won the race comfortably ahead of Fernando Alonso and Esteban Ocon.

== Complete Formula One results ==
Key

Key
Colour	Result
Gold	Winner
Silver	Second place
Bronze	Third place
Green	Other points position
Blue	Other classified position
Blue	Not classified, finished (NC)
Purple	Not classified, retired (Ret)
Red	Did not qualify (DNQ)
Black	Disqualified (DSQ)
White	Did not start (DNS)
White	Race cancelled (C)
Blank	Did not practice (DNP)
Blank	Excluded (EX)
Blank	Did not arrive (DNA)
Blank	Withdrawn (WD)
Blank	Did not enter (empty cell)
Annotation	Meaning
P	Pole position
F	Fastest lap
Superscript number	Points-scoring position in sprint

Year	Entrant	Power unit	Tyres	Driver name	Grands Prix																						Points	WCC pos.
Year	Entrant	Power unit	Tyres	Driver name	BHR	SAU	AUS	AZE	MIA	MON	ESP	CAN	AUT	GBR	HUN	BEL	NED	ITA	SIN	JPN	QAT	USA	MXC	SAP	LVG	ABU	Points	WCC pos.
2023	Oracle Red Bull Racing	Honda RBPTH001	P	(Mexico) Sergio Pérez	2	1^{P}	5^{F}	1^{1}	2^{P}	16	4	6^{F}	3^{2}	6	3	2	4	2	8	Ret	10	4^{5}	Ret	4^{3}	3	4	860	1st
2023	Oracle Red Bull Racing	Honda RBPTH001	P	(Netherlands) Max Verstappen	1^{P}	2^{F}	1^{P}	2^{3}	1^{F}	1^{P}	1^{P}^{F}	1^{P}	1^{P 1 F}	1^{P}^{F}	1^{F}	1^{1}	1^{P}	1	5	1^{P}^{F}	1^{P 2 F}	1^{1}	1	1^{P 1}	1	1^{P}^{F}	860	1st
