= Paul Monaghan =

Paul Monaghan may refer to:

- Paul Monaghan (politician) (born 1965), Scottish politician
- Paul Monaghan (engineer) (born 1967), British engineer
