= Andrea Landi =

Italian engineer

- Citizenship: (Italy) Italian
- Occupation: Engineer
- Employer: Red Bull Racing
- Title: Head of Performance

Andrea Landi is an Italian Formula One engineer. He is the Head of Performance at Red Bull Racing, and was formerly the Deputy Technical Director, responsible for car design and development, at the Racing Bulls Formula One team.

== Career ==
Landi began his motorsport career with Scuderia Toro Rosso, initially working as a performance engineer before moving into a race engineering role. He was race engineer to Jaime Alguersuari during the 2010 and 2011 Formula One seasons, and continued in the position with Jean-Éric Vergne in 2012.

After three seasons in Formula One, Landi moved to the BMW Team MTEK operation in the DTM, working as a race engineer with drivers Marco Wittmann and António Félix da Costa. His work in the championship covered both trackside operations and vehicle development activities over multiple campaigns.

Landi later returned to Formula One, joining Scuderia Ferrari as Head of Vehicle Dynamics. In this role, he oversaw three technical groups with responsibilities spanning tyre performance analysis, trackside car operation, and longer-term performance development.

Following his time at Ferrari, Landi joined Racing Bulls as Deputy Technical Director alongside Guillaume Cattelani, taking on responsibility for the design and development of the team's Formula One cars at its Faenza base in Italy. In April 2026, it was announced that Landi would join Racing Bull's senior team, Red Bull Racing as Head of Performance from July 1. This follows the promotion of Head of Performance Enginnering Ben Waterhouse to Chief Performance and Design Engineer.
