= Honda V6 hybrid Formula One power unit =

Honda V6 hybrid F1 power unit
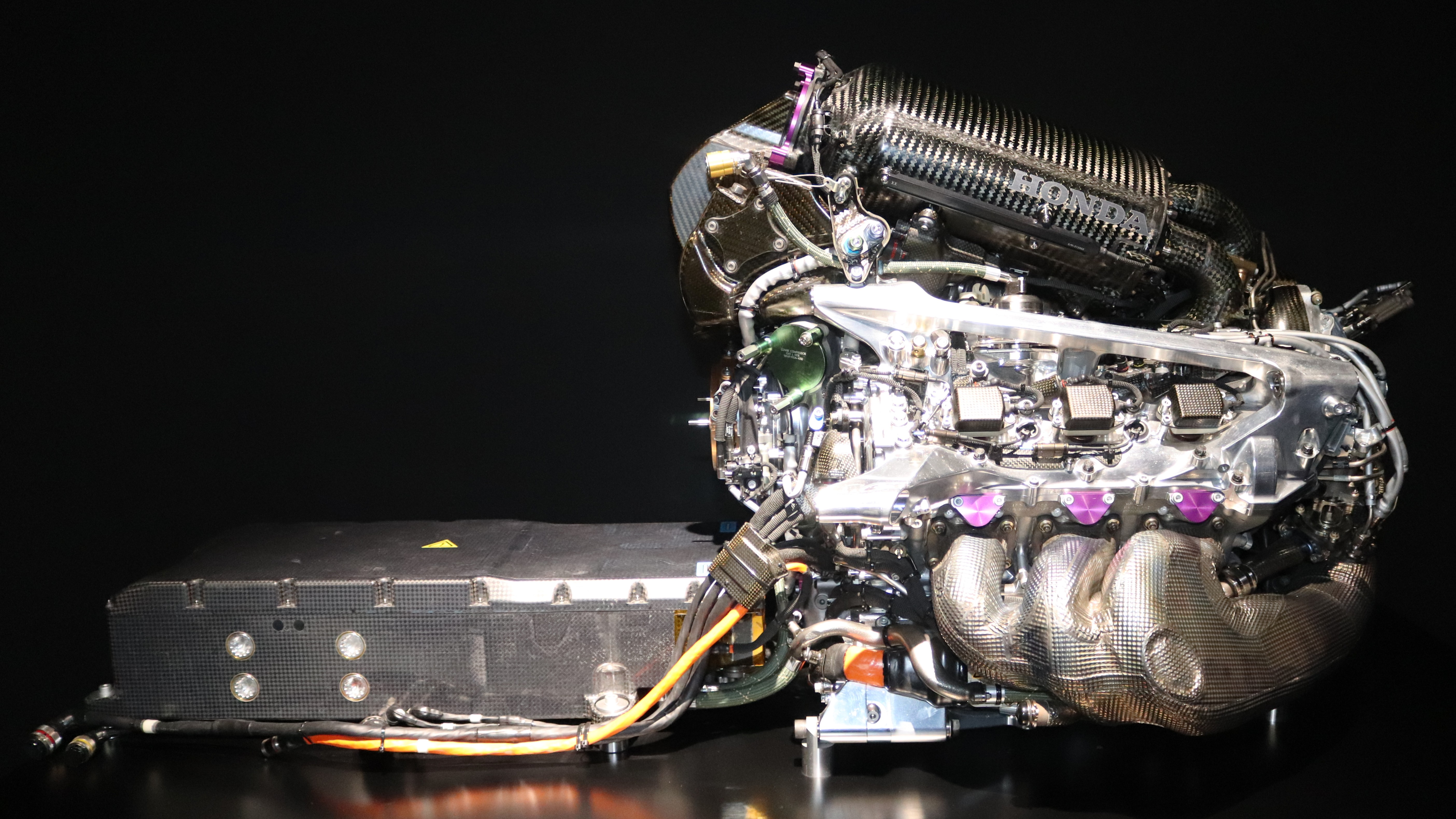
- The Honda RA621H power unit, used in the 2021 season

Overview
- Manufacturer: Honda
- Production: 2015–present

Layout
- Configuration: 90° V6 with single MGU-H hybrid turbo and MGU-K kinetic electric motor (2014-2025), 90° V6 with single turbo and MGU-K kinetic electric motor (2026-)
- Displacement: 1.6 L (98 cu in)
- Cylinder bore: 80 mm (3.15 in)
- Piston stroke: 53 mm (2.09 in)
- Cylinder block material: Aluminium alloy
- Cylinder head material: Aluminium alloy
- Valvetrain: 24-valve (four-valves per cylinder), DOHC
- Compression ratio: 13:1 - 18:1 (2015–2025), 16:1 (2026)

RPM range
- Idle speed: 3,000 rpm
- Max. engine speed: 15,000 rpm

Combustion
- Turbocharger: Hybrid turbocharger with 3.5–5.0 bar boost pressure
- Management: McLaren TAG-320 (2014–2018) later TAG-320B (2019–present)
- Fuel type: 2015–2016 and 2018–2021: Esso/Mobil Synergy unleaded gasoline 94.25% + 5.75% biofuel 2017: BP Ultimate unleaded gasoline 94.25% + 5.75% biofuel 2022–2025: Mobil Synergy unleaded gasoline 90% + 10% E10 biofuel 2026+: Aramco ProForce+ 100% Carbon Neutral Synthetic Fuel

Output
- Power output: 830–1,080 hp (619–805 kW)

Dimensions
- Dry weight: 145–150 kg (320–331 lb) overall

Chronology
- Predecessor: Honda V8 F1 engine

The Honda RA6xxH/RBPTH hybrid power units are a series of 1.6-litre, hybrid turbocharged V6 racing engines which from 2014 through to present, featured both a kinetic energy recovery (MGU-K) electric motor directly geared to the crankshaft and a heat energy recovery (MGU-H) electric motor attached via a common shaft to the turbocharger assembly. From 2026 onwards, new power unit regulations mandated the removal of the MGU-H electric motor. Developed and produced by Honda Motor Company (and subsequently under their Honda Racing Corporation organisation from 2022) for use in Formula One. The engines have been in use since the 2015 Formula One season, initially run by the then newly re-established McLaren Honda works team. Over years of development, power unit output was increased from approximately 760 to over 1,000 horsepower while utilising the same amount of fuel, as mandated by enforced technical regulations (Fuel Mass Flow Rate limit of 100kg per hour). Teams utilising the engines over the years include McLaren, Scuderia Toro Rosso, Scuderia AlphaTauri, Racing Bulls, Red Bull Racing, and Aston Martin.

== List of models ==
Engine specifications of the Honda Formula 1 hybrid V6 engines
Season	Name	Layout	Max. Total system output (est.)**	Notes
2015	RA615H	1.6L 90° V6 with MGU-H hybrid turbo and MGU-K kinetic electric motor	620 kW (830 hp)	
2016	RA616H	1.6L 90° V6 with MGU-H hybrid turbo and MGU-K kinetic electric motor	655 kW (878 hp)	
2017	RA617H	1.6L 90° V6 with MGU-H hybrid turbo and MGU-K kinetic electric motor	668 kW (896 hp)	New Split Turbo Architecture introduced
2018	RA618H	1.6L 90° V6 with MGU-H hybrid turbo and MGU-K kinetic electric motor	702 kW (942 hp)	High Speed Combustion concept introduced with Spec 3 PU
2019	RA619H	1.6L 90° V6 with MGU-H hybrid turbo and MGU-K kinetic electric motor	729 kW (977 hp)	
2020	RA620H	1.6L 90° V6 with MGU-H hybrid turbo and MGU-K kinetic electric motor	737 kW (989 hp)	
2021	RA621H	1.6L 90° V6 with MGU-H hybrid turbo and MGU-K kinetic electric motor	756 kW (1,014 hp)	New PU and energy store architecture introduced
2022	RBPTH001	1.6L 90° V6 with MGU-H hybrid turbo and MGU-K kinetic electric motor	780 kW (1,040 hp)	Engine Development Freeze* and 10% Ethanol Bio-Fuel introduced
2023	RBPTH001	1.6L 90° V6 with MGU-H hybrid turbo and MGU-K kinetic electric motor	780 kW (1,040 hp)	
2024	RBPTH002	1.6L 90° V6 with MGU-H hybrid turbo and MGU-K kinetic electric motor	810 kW (1,080 hp)	ICE Durability Upgrades
2025	RBPTH003	1.6L 90° V6 with MGU-H hybrid turbo and MGU-K kinetic electric motor	810 kW (1,080 hp)	
2026	RA626H	1.6L 90° V6 with MGU-K kinetic electric motor	750 kW (1,010 hp)	New power unit regulations***

*The engine development freeze was enforced from 2022 in efforts to reduce spending. Power unit performance specifications mounted to cars in first session running of the 2022 season were then locked in until the end of the 2025 season and no performance upgrades could be introduced. However, manufacturers are allowed to bring reliability upgrades during the freeze.

** System output estimates are final readings at season end.

*** New power unit regulations introduced from 2026. Removal of MGU-H hybrid turbo, and approx. 3x increase in MGU-K power output. Carbon neutral synthetic fuels are now mandatory. Reduction of compression ratio limit from 18:1 to 16:1.

== History ==
The Formula One hybrid engine regulations being introduced in 2014 had enticed Honda to make a return as an engine supplier due to the advanced technical challenge and environmentally focused direction. Having planned to enter in the 2016 season in a works partnership with McLaren, then McLaren CEO Ron Dennis, had pushed for Honda to fast track their debut to the 2015 season as their current contract with Mercedes was expiring. Honda had decided to accept the early entry believing they were well on target with their Power Unit concept.

Having entered Formula One in the 2015 season, one year earlier than initially planned, and experiencing difficulty for the first few years with regards to performance and reliability, primarily due to underestimating the technical challenge and being out of the Formula One world for over 7 years, the Honda V6 hybrid engine experienced a stratospheric developmental rise having started as an unreliable and underpowered design to becoming a world championship winning success. Becoming the first manufacturer to win a Formula 1 race with two different teams in the V6 hybrid era, as well as among many other major constructor and driver F1 records. Notably, Max Verstappen and Red Bull Racing, with a record breaking 19 wins in the 2023 Formula One World Championship, beating his own record of 15 the year prior, which itself beat the previous record held by McLaren Honda in the 1980s.

== Power units (2015–2025) ==
=== RA615H ===
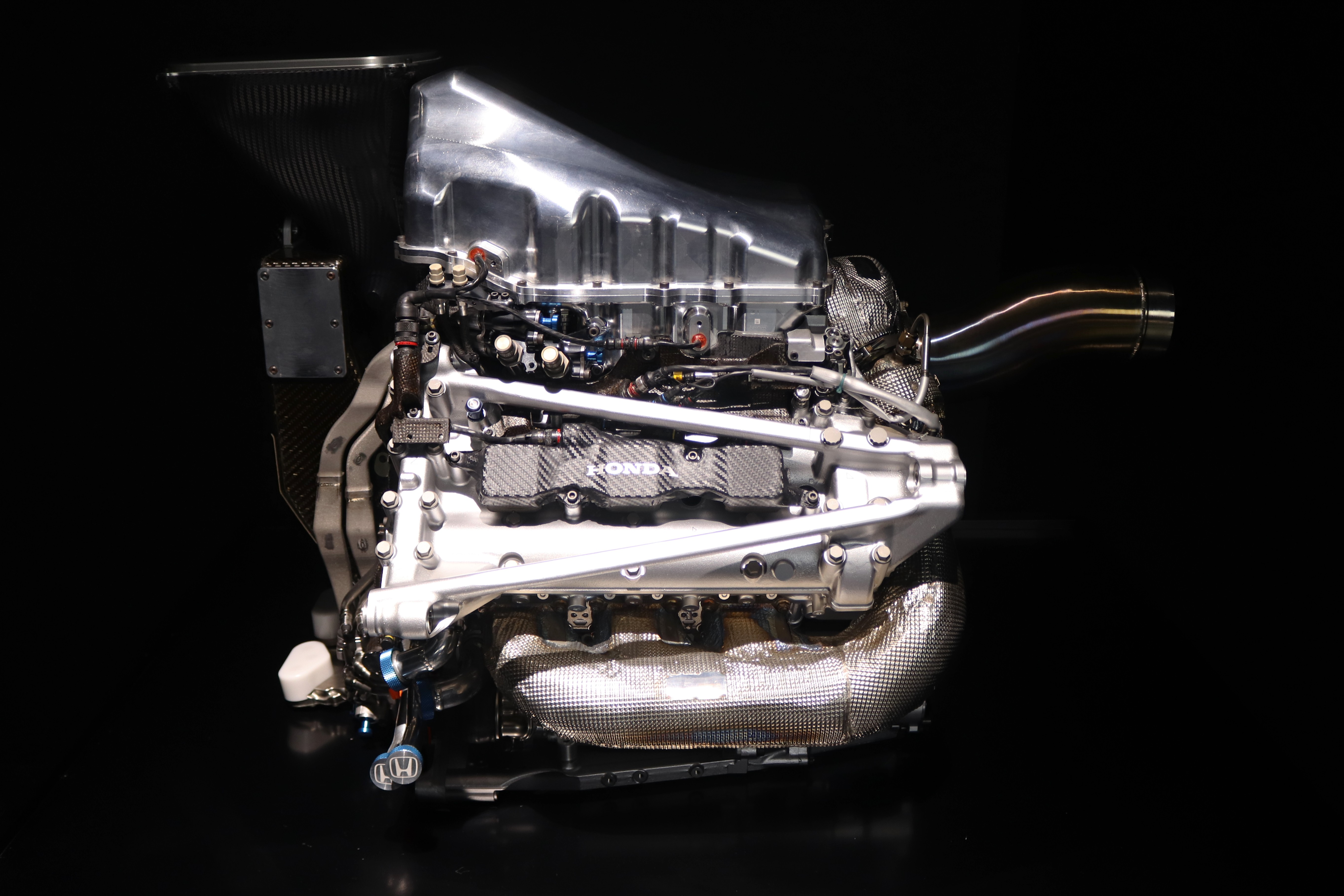
The ICE component of the 2015 Honda RA615H power unit

The RA615H, was Honda's first design for use in the V6 hybrid F1 era, debuting in the 2015 Formula One season powering the McLaren MP4-30. It was highly unique compared to the designs of rivals Renault, Mercedes and Ferrari who had already debuted power units the season prior, and as such, Honda felt its best chance to make up for lost development time was to go aggressive and radical.

The primary focus points of the unit, at the request of McLaren, were extremely compact dimensions and high operating temperature capability that could function with reduced cooling requirements as to aid aerodynamic performance and centre of gravity targets. The unit's turbocharger assembly was a compact but complex axial compressor arrangement with the MGU-H fitted between the turbine and compressor housings, all mounted within the vee of the engine in its entirety. This allowed for a significantly shorter engine compared to the Renault, Ferrari and Mercedes concepts whereby their compressor assemblies all protruded from either ends of the block in varying formats. The induction system, which includes the inlet, filters, intake plenum and variable inlet runners, were all small and ornate in design to fit under the tight bodywork dimensions. This made the entire system compact, but also very complex. The exhaust manifold was a small "log" type design (where one pipe housed ports for each cylinder on either bank), this was very beneficial to packaging requirements and allowed significantly tighter bodywork. The result was an engine that proved to be by far the smallest on the field, earning the nickname, "The Size-Zero", from McLaren, as it gave them the freedom to be aggressive with the body aerodynamics resulting in extremely tight packaging and efficient bodywork with the goal to make significant gains in this area over the competition.

After debuting publicly for the first time in the MP4-30 at the 2015 pre-season test at Jerez, rumours began circulating that the engine was extremely unreliable, heavy on fuel use and significantly down on power. This became evident with the very limited amount of circuit running McLaren Honda could do due to various issues with the engine appearing. It was quickly discovered that although the compact nature of the turbocharger assembly was beneficial to packaging, it proved to be vastly undersized and as such, had poor air compression capabilities which resulted in significantly less power and combustion efficiency potential. The intake system, while also compact, its complexity and compromise in ideal shape, orientation and size also proved too detrimental to performance and reliability. These all had further knock on effects to the hybrid energy side of the power unit, having poor regeneration capabilities. Honda's lack of experience in programming and controlling such a complex power unit made identifying specific issues difficult and time consuming. Additionally, the compact nature of the entire concept seriously hindered the thermal management and vibration severity of the engine, often causing various components to overheat, specifically the MGU-H, with uncontrolled resonances and vibration which led to constant hybrid system failures and terminal engine damage.

Honda maintained these were early teething issues, only discovered after mounting the engine to a moving chassis under racing loads for the first time and they would quickly sort these out. However as the season progressed, reliability issues and the ability to even complete a race distance became such a concern that the engines, already down on power, needed to be run in a reduced power state to lower thermal load in attempt to increase longevity, this severely compromised overall car performance in comparison to the competition. The restrictive "development token" system F1 used at the time slowed development significantly, limiting what developments could be brought forward in season at any given time leading to longer setbacks. Honda's lack of experience and data with the new regulations, fundamental issues with the "Size Zero" engine concept, while also self-admittedly entering the championship too early, were reasons given by Honda themselves for the lacklustre performance.

=== RA616H ===
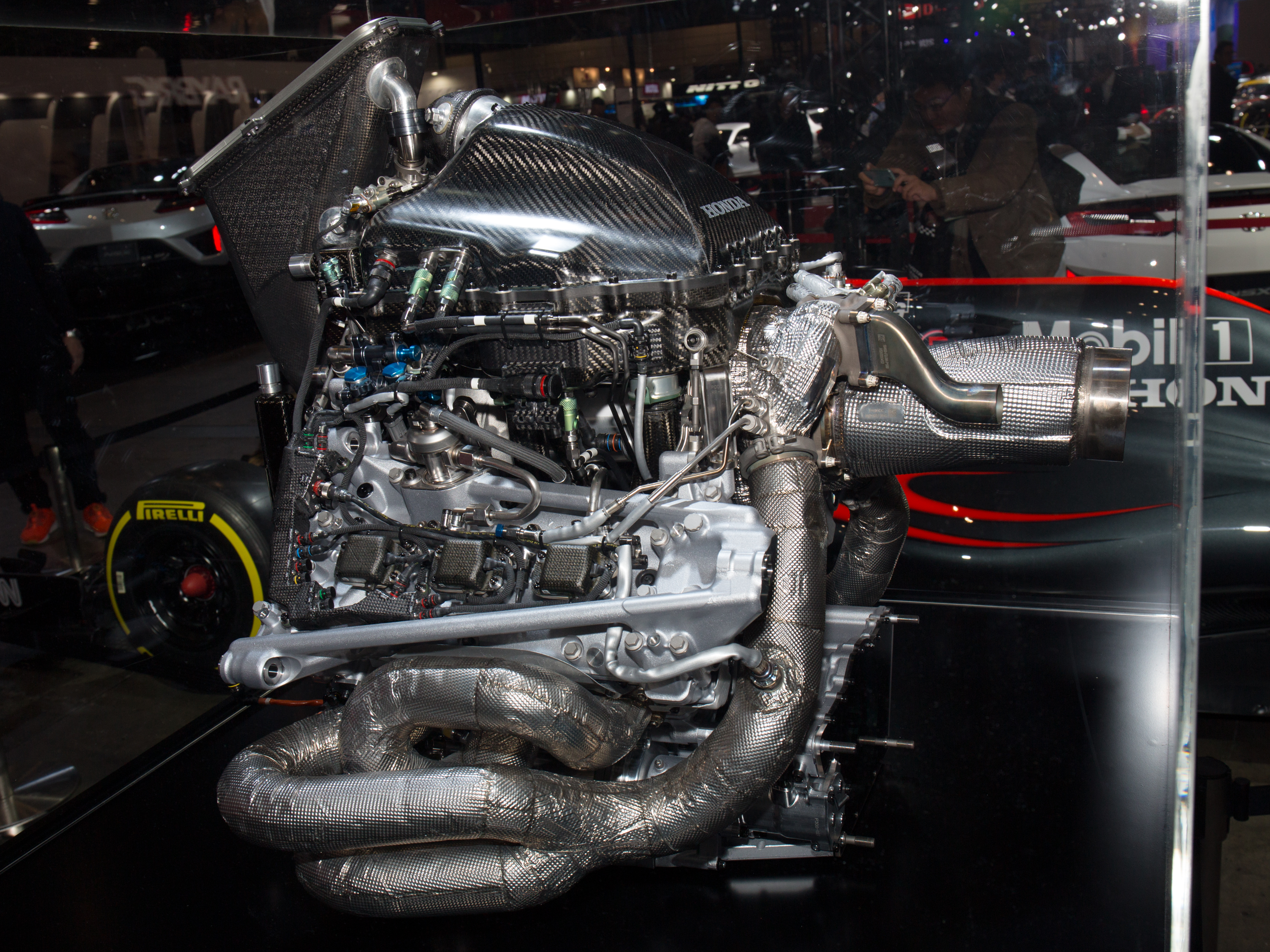
The ICE component of the 2016 Honda RA616H power unit

The RA616H made its racing debut in the McLaren MP4-31 in the 2016 Formula One season. This engine, still largely following the "Size Zero" concept of the RA615H, had significant developments in an effort to increase both power and reliability. After conversations with McLaren, it was agreed to allocate more space for the power unit, as such, the engine grew considerably in size. The entire induction system was reworked and raised higher, this allowed their "within vee" compressor assembly to be raised higher which allowed more space for a larger version, this provided more power and also improved heat regeneration for the hybrid system, although was still restricted to mounting within the vee of the engine. The new taller inlet plenum had more space, so larger and more refined inlet runners were developed to better feed the engine and was able to be simplified slightly, so reliability for the variable intake system increased. The exhaust manifold was completely reworked with equal length individual runners which were larger, but far more efficient. The MGU-K had a newer, more efficient magnet assembly which improved battery regeneration. The MGU-H also had revised magnets which were much more heat resistant to help improve reliability issues.

Overall, Honda had made as many changes to the engine as were allowed by the "development token" regulation still imposed by Formula One. Honda made clear that they were aware of the fundamental design restraints the current power unit concept had, but to properly address these issues, changes would need to be made to the token system to allow increased development speed in season.

The engine proved to be much more reliable and McLaren had a far better season, suffering from less engine related retirements and while still lagging behind, were more competitive in terms of outright power. However, there were still fundamental issues that were encountered, with MGU-H reliability, although improved, still far from acceptable levels for both McLaren and Honda themselves. The engine was improved further over the season to try and extract as much potential from the current architecture as possible and aside from reaching a relatively stable and reliable point towards the end of the season, Honda believed the current architecture was at its limit and would need drastic changes to move forward.

Following the issues faced by newcomer Honda and some of the other manufacturers when compared to the class-leading Mercedes units, F1 announced the scrapping of the development token system for the 2017 season onwards, allowing for significantly faster power unit development in the hopes the competition would begin to level out.

=== RA617H ===
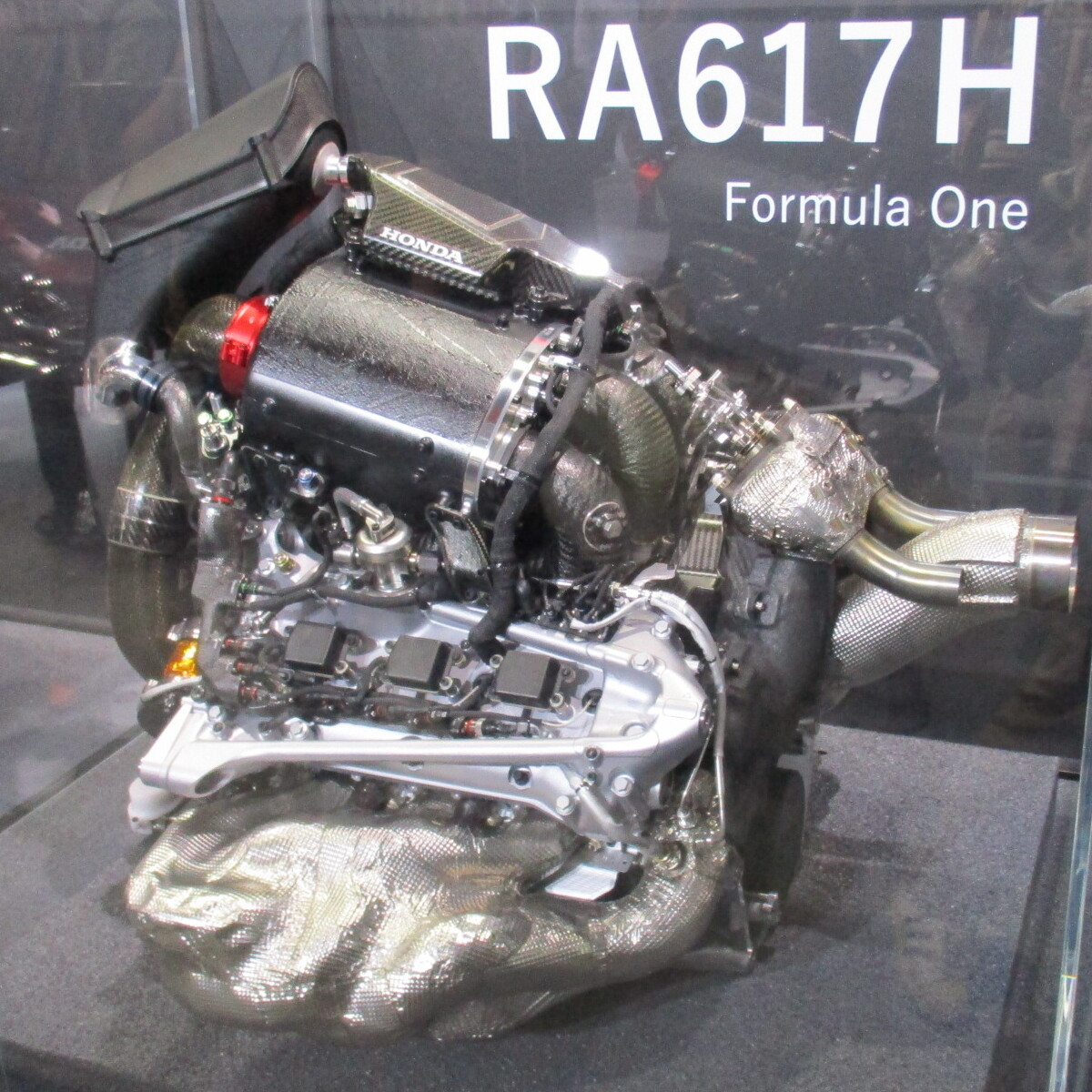
The ICE component of the 2017 Honda RA617H power unit

The RA617H made its racing debut in the 2017 Formula One season powering the McLaren MCL32. With the scrapping of the development token system, Honda moved to make a radical change, no longer restricted by the token system. The result was the RA617H, a completely new design with the most notable change being the reworked turbocharger/MGU-H setup. The new design now split the compressor and turbine housing and mounted each half on either end of the cylinder block protruding out of the vee. The MGU-H remained in the centre of the vee and the entire assembly was connected via one shaft. This increased the length of the engine, however it also allowed a significant lowering of the turbo/MGU-H setup and a greatly increased compressor and turbine size (no longer physically restricted by the bank angle within the vee), this then allowed the induction system above to also be lowered dramatically, which resulted in a much lower height engine with a vastly improved centre of gravity. Its design was totally overhauled, revising the orientation of the variable runners to a longitudinal position, whereas previously they were horizontally placed, opposing each other. This greatly improved the extension range they could operate which improved performance across a much broader RPM range while also simplifying the system which brought improved reliability. In discussion with McLaren, the MGU-K had its geartrain position reversed with a new structure and was now mounted further forward on the PU to better accommodate packaging and bodywork aero design McLaren were pursuing, this also provided a weight reduction and increased reliability. The MGU-H was significantly overhauled along with the new compressor system, now housing higher performance magnets to improve the flux field which improved battery regeneration performance. The combustion system was also completely overhauled, now utilising an experimental system known as Turbulent Jet Ignition or Pre-Chamber Ignition, which greatly increased power and efficiency potential, along with various other internal material changes. All these new technologies being implemented into one engine meant Honda admitted the entire unit was so experimental that it was a "high risk" move and would take time to realise the full potential of several aspects, but one they believed will ultimately provide much greater performance.

As pre-season testing began at Catalunya in Spain, fundamental issues with the power unit were found. The oil tank, which was previously mounted at the front of the engine, was now physically obstructed by the new compressor position and as such was re-designed with an unorthodox shape surrounding the compressor which, after initial running in the new McLaren MCL32 and being exposed to such high-G loads for the first time, was found to cause the oil flow to became unpredictable and restricted, with the engine often losing oil pressure in high load situations. Honda quickly identified the issue and set to work to create a new design tank to combat this, however it would not be ready until the second week of testing. The reasoning put forward for the issue was incorrect fluid dynamic simulation estimates of the lateral loads the 2017 car regulations would produce, which were far higher than expected. In the meantime, the temporary countermeasure was to overfill the oil tank to ensure flow was always available, this came with its own issues however, often overflowing into the intake system and damaging other components. This compromised running significantly and made completing testing programs for both the new engine and new chassis difficult. At the second week of pre-season testing and the revised oil tank fitted, other issues were observed. Again, unprecedented forces from the new 2017 regulation car being transmitted through the power unit, which acts as a stressed member of the car, also brought extreme drivetrain vibrations which caused various ancillary failures and more distressingly, a persistent catastrophic turbo/MGU-H shaft failure. The design of the MGU-H housing for the RA617H saw it cast as part of the cylinder block in efforts to improve strength, however this solution upon malfunction, would often terminally damage the ICE as well. The power unit issues during testing were so numerous that McLaren Honda found themselves changing complete power units endlessly, rather than identifying and fixing issues in an effort to gain as much mileage as possible on the car so chassis testing could be carried out.

Over the season, the engine suffered a severe amount of failures. Honda admitted it was taking longer than hoped to understand how to operate the new engine or come up with a viable long term fix for the vibration and shaft balance issues destroying the MGU-H. The engine was now being run in a state of tune that produced less power than the RA616H it replaced from the year prior for reliability concerns and even with consistent upgrades being provided through the season, progress was initially slow. This tarnished the relationship between Honda and McLaren with both parties showing public frustration with the other. The power unit eventually started to produce signs of progress in the latter half of the season as Honda brought countless updates to the Pre-Chamber Ignition system with varying jet orifice counts and sizes to gain a better understanding in its operation and various other improvements to related systems and finally reliability visibly began to improve and Honda was able to turn the power back up to where it produced more power than the RA616H it replaced.

=== RA618H ===
The RA618H was developed for the 2018 Formula One season and was the first Honda engine to power Scuderia Toro Rosso in the STR13. It was a much more mature development of Honda's brand new architecture introduced with the RA617H the year prior.

The power unit benefitted from Toro Rosso being significantly more relaxed on the engines dimension requirements than McLaren, with the team asking Honda to build the engine how they saw fit and they would build the car around it. Immediately, the engine was significantly more reliable than the RA617H, only suffering three engine related retirements over the entire season. The troublesome MGU-H was totally redesigned with input from Honda's aerospace division HondaJet, lending their significant experience in precision turbofan design. The MGU-H shaft and attached turbines spin at up to a regulation limit 125,000rpm and with the unique design of the split turbo assembly, getting such a long shaft to be perfectly balanced at such high rotational speeds was paramount to the assembly's reliability. As such, the shaft had its size and shape completely altered, its bearings improved and received an entirely new structural support mechanism which largely eliminated the resonance/vibration issues that affected the previous iteration. The MGU-H rotor was totally redesigned and now housed in a pressurised rotor chamber which further enhanced performance and reliability and received enhanced magnets to improve performance.

Now having more real estate on the car available to work with, the air intake funnel was enlarged and shaped more optimally for improved airflow into the engine, the exhaust manifold was further optimised and routed differently to suit the STR13 bodywork while gaining a net performance improvement, the cooling system designed for use in the STR13 was substantially more effective, the engine received structural reinforcements and material changes to better handle the forces experienced by the new generation cars and as such, the power unit increased in weight slightly, although still remained the lightest of the field. The MGU-K had its bearing supporting structure modified to improve reliability and also received higher efficiency electromagnets.

During the Canadian GP, Honda introduced the "Spec 2" version of the power unit which consisted of changes to the ICE and combustion system, solely in pursuit of performance. The engine proved to deliver a noticeable leap forward in power and it was this power unit that is believed to have pushed Honda ahead of rival Renault in performance and reliability. This performance gain, steep development curve and trajectory, investment into their facilities and drive to win was enough to convince Red Bull Racing to sign Honda as their power unit supplier from the 2019 season to replace Renault.

==== High Speed or Rapid Combustion ====
During research and testing in 2018 at HRD headquarters in Sakura, Honda engineers while running a prototype 2019 engine on the dyno, noticed a combustion phenomenon whereby cylinder pressures and power output would skyrocket momentarily before disappearing again. This occurred several times before it was discovered this was due to a mismatch of certain specification parts being fitted on the test engines. This led to Honda implementing a vastly improved quality check process, but it also encouraged a smaller team of engineers to look deeper into this phenomenon.

Red Bull Racing had also requested that Honda bring as many updates to its engines on track as physically possible, regardless of penalties incurred to Red Bull owned Scuderia Toro Rosso, if it would speed up development in preparation for the 2019 season. The result was the "Spec 3" test engine which made its debut at the 2018 Russian Grand Prix. This engine was a prototype for a new kind of combustion process discovered on the dyno's in Sakura after further research and development was undertaken to understand the phenomenon. Dubbed "rapid combustion" by Honda, it is a process in that a significantly more complete yet violent combustion event takes place under certain conditions which drastically improves output and efficiency of the engine.

In a conventional engine, "flame propagation combustion" is utilised, where the flame front within the combustion chamber begins at the spark plug electrode and propagates outward towards the cylinder walls. This propagation takes time to fully occur however, so optimal ignition timing is dictated by the speed of this propagation so that the peak of the combustion event occurs at the most optimal piston position during the power stroke for maximum force to be applied to the crankshaft. Because this event takes time to complete, the energy released is not all occurring at this optimal point so maximum work potential is lost. For example, the ignition timing is usually set for the spark to occur as the piston is still travelling upwards as that will allow for the peak of the combustion event to occur at the optimal piston position (precisely as it begins its downward stroke) for maximum work/power to be exerted on the crankshaft. With advancing it this far (spark beginning too early) however, to compensate for the burn time, can lead to combustion initially working against the piston movement or pre-ignition (detonation before intended), this causes knock and stress on the system and can also reduce power.

With this new combustion process ("rapid combustion"), conditions such as compression ratio and air/fuel mixture are optimised so flames are even-generated around the circumference of the combustion chamber, where self ignition is triggered by the pressure shock from the jet flames fired from the pre-chamber orifices. While the jet flames spread out to the circumference from the centre of the combustion chamber, the other flames spread from the circumference toward the centre, so combustion proceeds significantly more rapidly. This massively increases the burn speed, and so a much larger portion of the energy released occurs at the most optimal piston position during each power stroke, this increased maximum power and efficiency significantly, and due to this increase in burn speed, ignition timing could be more specific and optimised, also removing this small amount of combustion working against the piston on the upward stroke, further increasing the efficiency of the power unit. Combustion of this type allows for a much leaner than typical air/fuel ratio to be used which would otherwise be difficult to ignite in a conventional combustion engine. This process required a substantial increase in compression ratio to be made, and although very beneficial to efficiency, was extremely difficult to control and brought significant increases to cylinder pressures, which affected the durability of the ICE.

The Spec 3 engine was tested in a car for the first time during practice sessions at the Russian Grand Prix, with drivers reporting feeling a substantial increase in power, however there was a lot of vibration and unusual gearbox shift behaviour present. This was largely caused by the difficulty in stabilising the new combustion process during sudden RPM drops experienced during gearshifts. After the practice sessions, Honda refitted the previous Spec 2 engines for qualifying and the race as planned. The engine was found to have gained approximately 40-50hp just with this change initially, which was substantially more than estimations suggested. This increase and the method in which it produced this, pushed the engine past its structural design limits and as such needed further work on the engine to be able to withstand the increased power level, unique combustion process and further synchronisation work with the Red Bull sourced gearbox to smooth out gear change behaviour. The new combustion process was in its infancy and initially very unstable, so required more development time to understand and refine the power unit.

=== RA619H ===
The RA619H was the first Honda power unit to be supplied to Red Bull Racing, debuting in the RB15. It was also the first time Honda had supplied two teams in the current hybrid era of Formula One simultaneously, still continuing their relationship with Scuderia Toro Rosso, powering the STR14.

The engine was a further refinement of the initial RA617H engine concept introduced in 2017. Following on from the RA618H, the new engine had a more complete version of the "rapid combustion" process. Honda had refined the calibration and hardware to better utilise the combustion method and fuel partner ExxonMobil had developed a new type of fuel that stabilised the process in time for race debut. The engine had improvements across the board with refinements to the induction and exhaust systems for optimal packaging while bringing performance gains, the MGU-K had refined mechanical components to improve reliability under high temp operation, the electromagnetic internals were largely carried over from 2018. The MGU-H had a new stator, designed to work under increased water temperatures with a smaller radiator, the MGU-H motor now had the ability to be pushed harder in certain high-performance engine modes, the connecting shaft was increased in length to accommodate a new larger compressor but the dynamics of this shaft were further improved for reliability.

Throughout this season, Honda focused on improving energy management and calibration to improve driveability and extract optimal performance from the power unit across the season. During the French GP, Honda introduced a new compressor that greatly increased compressor efficiency by improving its aerodynamic performance. At the same time it had discovered a method in the calibration to largely maintain targeted performance during high ambient temperatures and altitudes. For the following race, they implemented these findings for the Austrian GP which is held at over 750m above sea level, where the engine performed faultlessly at high power in high temperatures where rival manufacturers were running into cooling issues. Max Verstappen went on to win this race which he attributes to Honda's constant efforts and willingness to keep pushing the envelope.

By this point, the RA619H's power output was closely matched to the rival Mercedes engine, making up significant ground since Honda's return in 2015.

=== RA620H ===
The RA620H was the fourth and final iteration of the engine architecture Honda introduced in 2017, powering the Red Bull Racing RB16 and the Scuderia AlphaTauri AT01 in the 2020 Formula One season.

The new combustion process, discovered in 2018 and fully integrated into the 2019 RA619H, provided substantial power and efficiency gains, however, the massively increased chamber pressure and often unstable detonation under certain conditions came at the cost of durability for the internal combustion engine. For the RA620H, Honda developed a new type of surface plating named "Kumamoto Plating" or "K-Plating". This patented method was applied to the cylinder bore and other high-stress surfaces. This drastically reduced the cylinder wear under high-speed combustion operation, allowing further steps to improve the efficiency and operation of this combustion process.

The 2019 MGU-K and MGU-H underwent strenuous durability and performance testing over the winter break and their limits were identified. So for 2020, the MGU-K was run harder and more aggressively, giving more torque in driving, and more regenerated electricity under engine-braking conditions. A more aggressive regeneration calibration was applied in a newly created operation mode known as "Extra Harvest". This mode allowed for large energy regeneration to occur in a short period, which placed more stress on the unit, so it was used only when most effective. The compressor was enlarged further to increase engine efficiency and the turbine housing was now 3D Printed (additive manufacturing) with Inconel, allowing more complex shapes to be created. Engine ancillaries were refined further to reduce parasitic losses. With the ability to produce components with additive fabrication, the MGU-H housing was also produced with a 3d printer, increasing strength and reducing weight. The ICE's steel pistons were also 3D Printed which allowed for ribs and indentations in places that were not possible when forged and machined, further increasing strength and again reducing weight.

To find more efficiency gains, Honda developed a device named the "Charge Air Cooler 2" or CAC2. Early variants of this were introduced on the 2016 engine and are a major part of the signature "Honda sound" the power units make on deceleration and downshifts. The CAC2 routes compressed air, that would otherwise be vented to the atmosphere, into the combustion chambers of "non-firing" cylinders. This re-routed compressed air has multiple benefits but primarily, it allows additional drive force for the turbine to be stored in cylinders when they are not firing, which has a faux "anti-lag" effect. This can be used to spool the turbo up without using battery power or be used to regenerate more energy with the MGU-H in regeneration mode. Secondly, this compressed air has a cooling effect within the chamber increasing durability and knock resistance.

The RA620H can be viewed as a mid-process example of Honda's usual conservative approach to power units, first ensuring reliability, then switching to an aggressive push to maximise the potential once the reliability is established, and then back to obtaining reliability. Honda believed they saw this switching point in the mid-2019 season and work had begun on a brand new, ground up design (RA621H) planned for introduction within two years.

=== RA621H ===
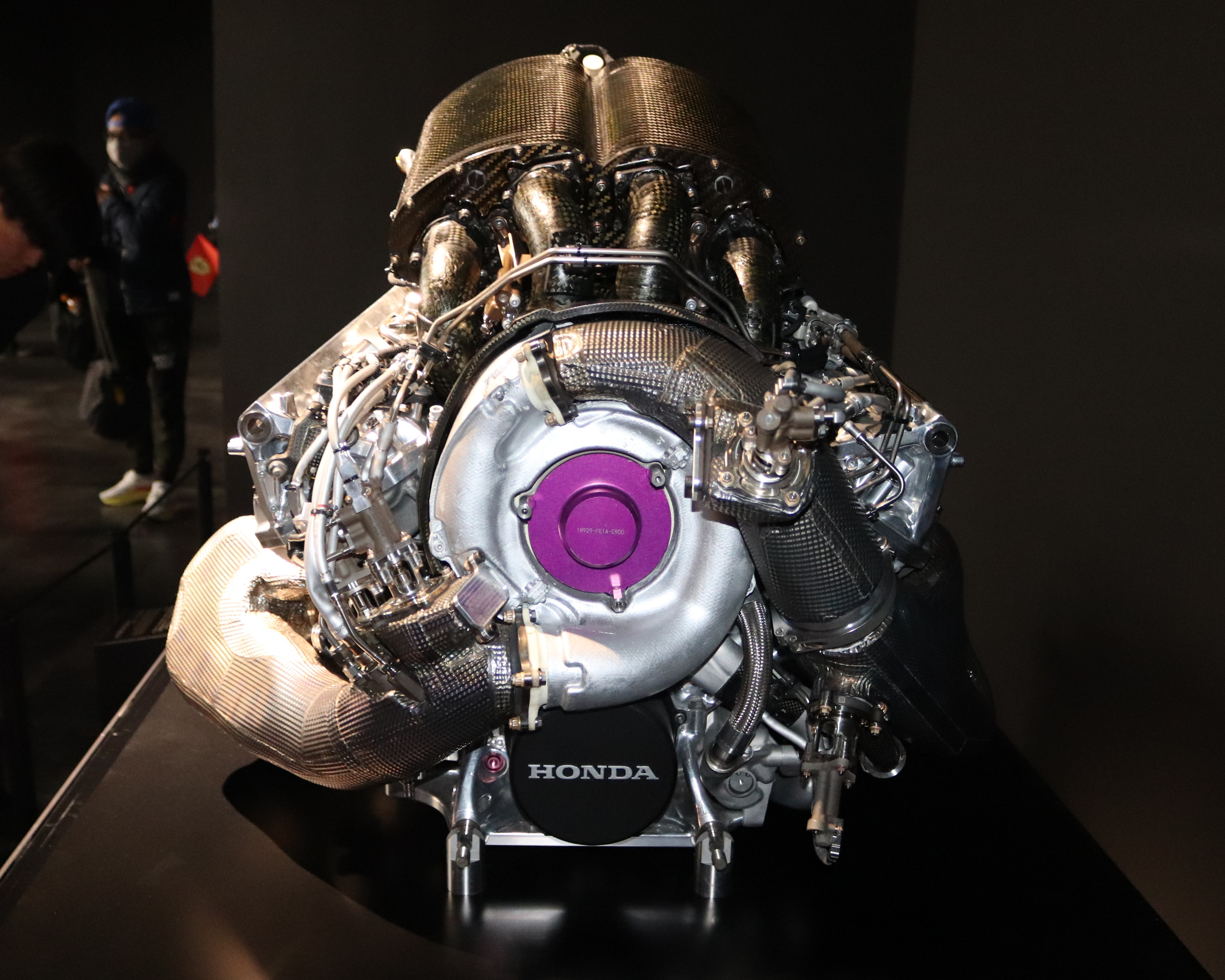
Rear of Honda RA621H power unit

After initially starting to match Mercedes' power unit performance in 2019, the performance step made in 2020 with the M11 EQ Performance power unit, even compared with Honda's own gains, was substantial. This had convinced Honda to accelerate development of its new engine which was originally planned for debut in 2022 along with the new car regulations. The late decision meant they had just six months to complete the engine and have it race ready for the 2021 Formula One season. Honda admitted this would be a monumental challenge and posed a lot of risks, but believed this would be the only way to overtake Mercedes. Team partner Red Bull Racing, after seeing the proposed improvements the new power unit would bring, gave their blessing and as such, the RA621H was born, powering the Red Bull Racing RB16B and the AlphaTauri AT02.

This engine was a drastic change from the previous iterations, with the entire core ICE architecture being redesigned for the first time. The camshaft layout was altered and now significantly more compact, lower down and closer together in the cylinder head. This changed the valve angle and shape of the combustion chamber, increasing the compression ratio of the ICE, lowering its centre of gravity and altering the airflow characteristics. The cylinder block was now machined from a single piece of new billet alloy as opposed to cast, drastically increasing the blocks strength which allowed the cylinder bore pitch to be reduced, placing the cylinders closer together. These major structural changes created a significant reduction in the overall size of the engine in height, length and width. In discussion with Red Bull Racing and Alpha Tauri, the bank offset was reversed, the induction manifold was further optimised for performance and packaging and the exhaust manifolds were redesigned and became an asymmetric setup being radically different from left to right banks to improve exhaust pulse tuning and better optimise packaging within both cars. The MGU-H had vastly improved magnets and a new insulator, improving the cooling performance while also increasing power and torque output and the MGU-K had its gear ratio revised which further improved regeneration under coasting or braking and overall torque output under motoring, and had a brand new housing which was more resistant to vibration.

With the vastly improved thermal efficiency of the new ICE came a trade-off, a reduction in waste exhaust energy output which negatively impacts turbocharger and hybrid regeneration performance. The key for Honda engineers was to play a balancing act in increasing ICE efficiency and crank power output but without losing too much exhaust heat energy which would harm regeneration potential for the battery. To mitigate the losses, the turbocharger assembly was revised in attempt to more efficiently harvest what was available and the compressor was increased in size again with the compressor wheel having significant changes made to the blades and the turbine itself was also modified.

==== Carbon Nano Tube (CNT) Energy Store ====
Honda also introduced a brand new energy store (ES) for the first time, which had been in the developmental phase since 2016. The aim was to create a battery that combined improvements in energy efficiency with significant reductions in weight. The technology utilised in the new ultra-high energy battery cell was revealed to be an in-house Honda developed ES utilising Carbon Nano Tubes (CNT), battery cell electrodes containing carbon particles, and electricity flows through these particles. By filling the spaces between carbon particles with the nanometer-sized, tube-shaped CNTs (with a diameter of one millionth of a millimetre), it is possible to achieve extremely low resistance and enable electricity to flow more freely. Demonstrating significant reductions in resistance and deterioration over its lifespan, the power unit's energy harvesting and deployment characteristics improved substantially. The volumetric output density (Watt per kg) of the new ES introduced in the 12th round of the 2021 season is 1.3 times greater (130% improvement) than that of the ES used in 2020 and 2021. This allowed the cars to have deployable hybrid energy available much more of the time and much faster regeneration capability compared to the rest of the field. As compared to the 2015 Energy Store, even with the dramatic improvement in density and efficiency, the brand new battery is 26% smaller and 15% lighter, which contributes greatly from the perspectives of energy management and optimising vehicle driving performance.

All these changes added up to a power unit that was significantly more powerful and reliable, while becoming even smaller and lighter than the original RA615H "Size-Zero" engine of 2015. This provided massive gains to teams, now able to create more aggressive body packaging which aided aero development. The power unit quickly became the front runner of the field with superior power, energy recovery abilities with outstanding reliability and was a key factor in driving Max Verstappen to his first ever World Drivers Championship in the 2021 season.

=== RBPTH001 ===
The RBPTH001 is a development of the RA621H designed for use in the 2022 Formula 1 World Championship (and subsequently the 2023 Formula 1 World Championship) powering the Red Bull Racing RB18 and AlphaTauri AT03 in 2022 and the Red Bull Racing RB19 and AlphaTauri AT04 in 2023. It represents the final permitted power unit design change before the engine freeze began on March 1st, 2022.

After Honda's formal F1 exit, the engines remain Honda-developed, produced, assembled, maintained, and trackside supported, and will remain as such until the end of the 2025 season when a new engine era will begin. Honda developed the 2022 RBPTH001 power unit at its research and development centre in Sakura City, Tochigi prefecture, run by Honda’s racing subsidiary, HRC (Honda Racing Corporation).

==== 10% Ethanol fuel (E10) introduced ====
The main developments of the engine were to accommodate the use of the new E10 fuel and the challenges it brought. The construction of the ethanol molecule means it has a lower calorific value as a combustible component compared to an equivalent volume of petrol, making the combustion process less potent and therefore, power is reduced. This is usually compensated by combusting a larger quantity of fuel (and a corresponding increase of air, usually in the form of increased boost pressure) to make up for the lower energy density, however this is not an option as F1 regulations restrict fuel flow to 100kg/hour, so to regain lost power potential, the engine would need to be pushed harder and made more thermally efficient to extract more of the available fuel energy content.

There are some exploitable beneficial characteristics of ethanol, however. The new E10 fuel blend is more resistant to detonation, allowing engines to be run in a higher stress state if well controlled, so for the RBPTH001, along with significant improvements to all the technologies introduced over the past 6 years to the power unit, the result was a major evolution that made even the regulation maximum compression ratio of 18:1 feel restrictive despite it being an enormously high target when Honda first rejoined F1 in 2015. This along with raising the nominal boost pressure, helped to drive combustion efficiency higher and mitigate power losses brought from the lower energy fuel, essentially harnessing more of the available fuel energy to compensate. This greatly increases the stress on the power unit though, with cylinder pressures now the highest they have been. So the combustion chamber and mechanism was further developed to accommodate the new burn characteristics and lower calorific fuel, the bottom end internals were strengthened, and the ignition timing map was altered completely from the 2021 engine. The MGU-H and turbine were re-tuned to better cope with the E10 exhaust gas density change and further unique internal changes to reduce crevice losses in combustion were made. Ethanol also has a higher latent heat of vaporisation than gasoline, so the increased ethanol content brought a charge cooling effect, reducing combustion chamber temperatures, this benefit allowed the previously mentioned changes to be made and allowed Honda to increase the nominal running water temperature of the engine, this meant it required less cooling and provides a further aerodynamic benefit to teams building the car, being able to reduce cooling inlet and outlet sizes.

The crankshaft and cylinder block geometry were adjusted to ensure reliability with the new E10 combustion conditions, while a further development of Honda's Kumamoto plating was applied to the cylinder bores. The resulting power unit weighs slightly more than the RA621H, just from strengthened internal components. Even challenged with the reduced energy content of the new fuel, the 2022 engine achieved a higher thermal efficiency value than the 2021 engine. With road car engines achieving between 20-35%, Honda had achieved a result well over 50%, making the RBPTH001 one of the most power dense and efficient gasoline reciprocating engines ever developed.

=== RBPTH002 ===
The RBPTH002 was developed for use in the 2024 Formula One season, replacing the RBPTH001 that was used in the 2022 and 2023 seasons. It powered the Red Bull Racing RB20 and RB VCARB 01 and the RB21 and VCARB 02. With the engine freeze in place since 2022, power unit development has been restricted to reliability improvements only. For 2024, Honda made further improvements to the RBPTH001 to increase the engines durability, this increased the reliability of the power unit with increased racing distance thresholds before degradation began to reduce performance. The gains allowed teams to run the engine in a higher power state (more aggressive engine modes) for longer periods of time without any negative effects. This allows for a more performative power unit during the season. Specific details of the changes have not as yet been disclosed to the public but the changes made were drastic enough to warrant a new designation in the engine series, as the RBPTH002.

The last podiums scored by Red Bull's teams with Honda engines were the Abu Dhabi (Red Bull) and Dutch Grands Prix (Racing Bulls).

== Power units (2026–present) ==
=== RA626H ===
The RA626H is Honda's first power unit design under the new regulations for the 2026 Formula 1 World Championship, powering the Aston Martin AMR26, marking the first collaboration between Honda Racing Corporation and Aston Martin. The new regulations mandate the removal of the MGU-H used in the previous power units, and for the MGU-K power output to be increased approximately three-fold (470 bhp (350 kW) from 160 bhp (120 kW)). The power output of the ICE itself has been decreased to 540 bhp (400 kW) from 850 bhp (630 kW) due to reduced energy flow limits, reducing maximum fuel allowance to roughly 70kg per race. The compression ratio limit was also reduced from 18:1 to 16:1 and the new power units must run on 100% carbon neutral, sustainable fuels.

The engine was revealed in a bespoke event held in Tokyo on 20 January 2026, and debuted on track at a private pre-season shakedown at Circuit de Barcelona-Catalunya on 27 January. HRC's Large Project Leader, Tetsushi Kakuda, admitted the challenge for these new engines was significant. With the previous engine; the high compression ratio limit, the inclusion of the MGU-H and previous higher fuel flow rate allowed them usage of unique combustion and energy harvesting techniques which afforded them advantages over their rivals and were key to their ultimate performance. With the new regulations removing the MGU-H, reducing the compression ratio limit and fuel flow rate, and moving to new sustainable fuels, this rendered these techniques largely unusable, requiring them to find new ideas to recover the performance lost.

The RA626 was built to be as compact as possible, with a unique two-tier battery and control electronics system, to allow for tighter bodywork and improved aerodynamic performance, the new, larger MGU-K was moved in front of the power unit (previously it was alongside the ICE), still within the survival cell. It is the first Honda Power Unit to use the all-new, Aramco ProForce+ 100% sustainable fuel.

==== Development issues and progress ====
During the shakedown and subsequent test at Bahrain International Circuit, Aston Martin were late in arriving, citing that they were developing the car until the last possible minute, however upon taking to the track, the Honda engine showcased numerous deficits, preventing the team from obtaining sufficient mileage to properly validate the cars mechanical and aerodynamic philosophy, ultimately resulting in Aston Martin recording the lowest mileage of all teams.The team recorded three breakdowns over all the tests, and during the latter test, its recorded fastest time was four seconds slower than the fastest time recorded by Charles Leclerc's Ferrari. Honda confirmed that severe vibrations were damaging the battery system and causing significant discomfort to the drivers, with both not able to complete more than 15 laps before losing feeling in their hands.

The poor performance and unreliability was so severe that Honda used up many of its spare parts during just the Bahrain test alone in effort to gain as much mileage as possible, which had a knock on effect of leaving them unprepared for the 2026 Australian Grand Prix, to the point it was rumoured Aston Martin had considered skipping the round by qualifying within the 107% rule and retiring early to conserve parts. Ultimately, after a surprisingly impressive start to the race by Fernando Alonso, it became clear the team did not have the ability to maintain pace to score points, so the decision was made to pit the cars, perform system checks and then send it out again to obtain mileage, effectively treating the race as a test session to secure more data. Towards the end, both drivers withdrew from the Grand Prix after running last out of the finishing cars. Lance Stroll in particular crossed the line as the chequered flag was displayed, but was not classified due to being 12 laps down off of the nearest car of Sergio Pérez. A second consecutive double retirement was observed at the following round, where Stroll's battery control electronics failed and Alonso suffered vibration issues too severe for him to physically continue.

During this time, Honda and Aston Martin continued to inform press that the issues were plentiful, with the engine deficiencies not allowing them to properly shakedown the car to resolve any chassis issues or increase its competitiveness in general. The team jointly admitted they were working around the clock to isolate the vibration issues and were employing further countermeasures to reduce vibrations between each round, and while Honda confirmed they had successfully reduced them to the point battery reliability has increased, the vibrations still remained significant enough for the drivers that the prolonged running required to complete a race distance has not been achievable without posing a health risk. Due to this, they ran the power unit in a detuned state, and with a reduced RPM limit in effort to minimise them, though they had significant energy management flaws compared to the rest of the field.

During the third round, the Japanese Grand Prix, Aston Martin successfully completed a full race, finishing in 18th with Fernando Alonso's car. Lance Stroll retired due to water pressure issues. During FP2, the team tested a new countermeasure in hopes of reducing vibrations in the car. The test proved a success, with Fernando Alonso reporting the vibrations had almost entirely disappeared. Following a review, the team reported they are now confident in understanding the root cause of the issue, but chose to remove the countermeasure in subsequent sessions and the race on reliability grounds but believed that by the next race in Miami, they will have entirely solved the issue and will be able to focus on improving performance of both the car and the new power unit. While no announced upgrades were brought to the Miami Grand Prix, the vibrations were reduced to normal levels for both cars which helped both drivers finish the race, placing fifteenth and seventeenth. HRC President Koji Watanabe made comment that the vibrations from the RA626H were basically identical to those produced by the previous engine at Red Bull, where they had zero issues, so the root cause was somewhere within the integration but declined to elaborate further on the root cause. At the following rounds in both Canada and Monaco, Honda had advised press they have made significant improvements to energy management, driveability and general PU optimisation (ignition timing, AF ratio etc). While these changes improved the driveability of the engine and general performance, overall competitive positioning on track of the AMR26 had not drastically changed, Honda maintained it was constantly improving the operation of the engine with each round as it learns more about the new power unit. Honda advised not to expect much performance change until the summer break where it plans to introduce its first substantial power unit upgrade at the Dutch Grand Prix which they hope will bring at least a 0.5s improvement in performance per lap. As the reliability improved, and stable running could be completed, it became evident that the AMR26 chassis and gearbox had severe deficiencies exacerbating the power unit troubles. Aston Martin confirmed an extremely revised car would be introduced at the Hungarian Grand Prix, which they hope will bring a 2-3 second improvement in lap time.

After the Monaco Grand Prix, the FIA revealed the results of the first round of ADUO (Additional Development and Upgrade Opportunities), a new system awarding more budget allowance and development time to power unit manufacturers who are found to be a certain percentage behind the lead power unit's performance in a season. The ICE component of Honda's RA626H power unit was found to have a 6-8% deficit (36-48hp) to the RBPT Ford engine in terms of power, so Honda was granted increased budget allowance and development time and the ability to introduce two additional engine specifications during the 2026 season.

The following four race events in Spain, Austria, Great Britain, and Belgium were used to develop more advanced software programming and energy management strategies with the goal to significantly improve the driveability of the engine. By Hungary, both drivers reported an enormous improvement in this area, with the power unit now operating in a much more natural way.

At the Dutch Grand Prix, Honda introduced its "Spec 2" power unit. The changes focused on significant alterations to the Internal Combustion Engine hardware, specifically around the combustion process to increase the speed of the combustion event and improve its stability, and other areas aimed at reducing overall friction. While the increase in power has not been made public, Honda declared they had met their internal targets and successfully validated the gains on track. However, while there were performance gains of around 0.2s per lap, the new combustion process reverted many of the advances made with the previous engine on the software side with regards to driveability, with both drivers complaining of declined downshifts and unpredictable engine braking and power delivery. Honda maintain this is only temporary and are improving the driveability with each session as they integrate lessons learned onto the Spec 2's new combustion characteristics. As these issues are ironed out, HRC Trackside Manager Shintaro Orihara believes a further 0.3s can be found in pure performance. These figures suggest an increase of approximately 30-35hp if the engine can be run at maximum potential.

== Season statistics for hybrid era Honda engines ==
Constructors	Chassis	Season(s)	Races	Wins	Pole positions	Podiums	Fastest laps	WCC
McLaren	MP4-30	2015	19	0	0	0	0	9th
McLaren	MP4-31	2016	21	0	0	0	1	6th
McLaren	MCL32	2017	20	0	0	0	1	9th
Toro Rosso	STR13	2018	21	0	0	0	0	9th
Red Bull, Toro Rosso	RB15, STR14	2019	21	3	2	11	3	3rd, 6th
Red Bull, AlphaTauri	RB16, AT01	2020	17	3	1	14	3	2nd, 7th
Red Bull, AlphaTauri	RB16B, AT02	2021	22	12	10	24	9	2nd, 6th
Red Bull, AlphaTauri	RB18, AT03	2022	22	17	8	28	8	1st, 9th
Red Bull, AlphaTauri	RB19, AT04	2023	22	21**	14	30	11	1st, 8th
Red Bull, Racing Bulls	RB20, VCARB 01	2024	24	9	8	18	4	3rd, 8th
Red Bull, Racing Bulls	RB21, VCARB 02	2025	24	8	8	16	3	3rd, 6th
Aston Martin	AMR26	2026	20	0	0	0	0	10th
Total		2015–2026	252	72	50	140	42	2

** Historical record for most wins in a season - Red Bull Racing

== See also ==
- Audi V6 hybrid Formula One power unit
- Ferrari V6 hybrid Formula One power unit
- Mercedes V6 hybrid Formula One power unit
- Red Bull Ford V6 hybrid Formula One power unit
- Renault V6 hybrid Formula One power unit
