= Guillaume Cattelani =

French engineer

- Born: France
- Education: Pierre and Marie Curie University (PhD)
- Occupation: Engineer
- Years active: 1997-2026

Guillaume Cattelani is a French Formula One engineer and aerodynamicist who most recently was Deputy Technical Director at the Racing Bulls Formula One team - responsible for car performance development.

== Career ==
Cattelani completed a PhD in Fluid Mechanics, specialising in turbulence modelling, at Pierre and Marie Curie University in Paris. He began his motorsport career in 1997 as a Research Aerodynamicist with PSA Peugeot Citroën, working on airflow and structural studies for automotive applications. In 1998, he joined Lola Cars, initially as a CFD and wind-tunnel aerodynamicist before becoming Head of Aerodynamics in 2001, with responsibility for aerodynamic development across the company’s racing programmes.

In 2004, Cattelani became a Senior Aerodynamicist consultant for Dallara, contributing to aerodynamic development and wind-tunnel model design work for single-seater projects. He returned to Peugeot Sport in 2006 as Head of Aerodynamics for the Peugeot 908 HDi FAP Le Mans prototype and later was Chief Designer for the programme from 2007 to 2012.

Cattelani moved to Lotus F1 Team in 2012 as Principal Aerodynamicist, working on aerodynamic concept development through the final years of the V8 engine era. In 2014, he joined McLaren Racing as Head of Aerodynamics, leading the team’s aerodynamic department during the early hybrid power unit era.

In 2020, he moved to Red Bull Racing as Chief Engineer - Technology and Analysis Tools, winning two constructors and three drivers titles at Milton Keynes. He joined Red Bull's sister team, Racing Bulls, in 2024 as Deputy Technical Director alongside Andrea Landi, overseeing performance-development activities. In April 2026, it was announced that fellow Deputy Technical Director Landi would join Racing Bull's senior team, Red Bull Racing as Head of Performance from July 1 following the promotion of Head of Performance Enginnering Ben Waterhouse to Chief Performance and Design Engineer. In addition, it was reported that Cattelani would be leaving the team as Technical Director Dan Fallows commences work.
