= Enrico Balbo =

Italian engineer

- Occupation: Formula One aerodynamicist
- Employer: Red Bull Racing
- Known for: Formula One engineer
- Title: Head of aerodynamics

Enrico Balbo is an Italian Formula One aerodynamicist. He is currently the head of aerodynamics at the Red Bull Racing team.

== Career ==
Balbo studied Aerospace engineering at the Politecnico di Torino before completing a year of postgraduate study at ISAE-Supaero in Toulouse, France. He subsequently spent a short period working at Airbus in Toulouse. Balbo later attended the University of Southampton, where he continued his studies in aerodynamics.

He began his professional career at Fondtech, an aerodynamics consultancy founded by Jean-Claude Migeot, where he contributed to the testing and development work for the Renault Formula One cars that went on to win the 2005 and 2006 titles.

Balbo joined Williams in 2006, as an aerodynamicist until the middle of 2008 where he subsequently moved to trackside as a trackside aerodynamicist. During his time as an aerodynamicist before moving to trackside, he was also the one who developed Williams's innovative double diffuser design on the FW31. Subsequently, he served as trackside aerodynamicist from 2008 to 2010 where he was promoted to be an aerodynamics team leader.

In 2013, Balbo moved to the Mercedes Formula One Team as Future Car Aerodynamic Group Leader, contributing to the design of the team's Formula One cars from 2014 to 2018.

In 2018, he joined Red Bull Racing as Principal Aerodynamicist, was promoted to head of aerodynamic development in 2020, and assumed the position of Head of Aerodynamics in 2021. In this capacity, he has overseen the design and development of several of Red Bull's championship-winning cars, including the RB16B, RB18, and RB19.
