= Ben Waterhouse =

British engineer

- Born: 28 September 1979 (age 46); United Kingdom
- Occupation: Engineer
- Employer: Red Bull Racing
- Known for: Formula One engineer
- Title: Chief Performance and Design Engineer

Ben Waterhouse (born 28 September 1979) is a British Formula One engineer. He is currently the Chief Performance and Design Engineer at the Red Bull Racing Formula One team.

== Career ==
Waterhouse studied automotive engineering at Loughborough University but turned to motorsport shortly after graduation. He started at Jaguar Racing in December 2003 as a structural analysis engineer, moving into vehicle dynamics by the time Red Bull Racing came into being. He departed in 2008 for a role with BMW Sauber and was part of a talented group of vehicle performance engineers such as Loïc Serra and Pierre Waché that oversaw a series of memorable years for the Swiss outfit in which they were particularly good at maximising performance from the Pirelli tyres. In 2013 Waterhouse rose to the position of Head of Vehicle Performance but left the Hinwil-based quad to seek a new challenge as Deputy Technical Director of Scuderia Toro Rosso. He spent three years working at the Faenza team, before returning to Red Bull Racing in 2017, first as Deputy Head of Performance Engineering before stepping up to Head of Performance Engineering in the summer of 2018.

Waterhouse played a key role in Red Bull's resurgence, helping the team win constructors titles with the R18 and RB19. In April 2026, he was promoted as part of a technical restructure to Chief Performance and Design Engineer, having a broader remit in bridging the design and vehicle performance departments and following the departure of Chief Designer Craig Skinner prior to the start of the season.
