= Craig Skinner (engineer) =

British Formula One engineer

- Education: University of Glasgow (MS)
- Occupations: Engineer; aerodynamicist; automotive designer
- Years active: 2002–present
- Employer: Cadillac
- Known for: Formula One engineer
- Title: Chief Development Engineer

Craig Skinner is a British Formula One engineer and aerodynamicist. Since November 2026, he serves as the Chief Development Engineer at Cadillac; he was previously the Chief Designer for the Red Bull Racing Formula One team from 2022 until his departure in February 2026.

== Career ==
Skinner studied Aeronautical Engineering at the University of Glasgow, graduating in 2002 with first-class honours. Following graduation, Skinner joined ANSYS Fluent (then Fluent Inc.) as a CFD Engineer, at a time when computational fluid dynamics (CFD) was becoming an increasingly important tool in Formula One development. As part of Fluent's technical support programme, he worked with several F1 teams including Red Bull Racing, Williams Racing, and Jordan Grand Prix.

In 2006, Skinner moved to Red Bull Racing as a CFD Engineer within the aerodynamics department. He was promoted to CFD Team Leader in 2009, then to Deputy Head of Aerodynamics in 2014, and subsequently Chief Aerodynamicist in 2018.

In April 2022, Skinner was appointed Chief Designer, overseeing car design and aerodynamic integration for the team's Formula One projects at its Milton Keynes headquarters. Skinner has been part of multiple Constructors’ Championship-winning campaigns with Red Bull Racing, contributing to the design and development of several title-winning Formula One cars. He was the chief designer of the Red Bull Racing RB19, the most dominant car in Formula One history.

On 17 February 2026, it was announced that Skinner was leaving Red Bull Racing via resignation on his own accord "with immediate effect", on the eve of the 2026 season. However, in May, this was disputed by F1 Journalist Erik Van Haren who claimed Skinner had been dismissed by Red Bull Racing.

On 24 September 2026, he was announced to be joining Cadillac as Chief Development Enginner. He commenced work in the role in November 2026.
