= Paul Monaghan (engineer) =

British engineer

- Born: Paul Gerard Monaghan; 18 October 1967 (age 58)
- Citizenship: British
- Education: University of Hertfordshire (MS)
- Occupation: Engineer
- Years active: 1990-present
- Employer: Red Bull Racing
- Known for: Formula One engineer
- Title: Chief Engineer, Car Enginnering

Paul Gerard Monaghan (born 18 October 1967) is a British Formula One engineer. He is currently the chief engineer for car engineering at the Red Bull Racing Formula One team.

== Career ==
Monaghan gained his master's degree in Mechanical Engineering from the University of Hertfordshire and then began his motorsport career working at McLaren Racing in 1990 starting out in research and development department before moving to the special projects division. He eventually advanced to the position of data engineer, working alongside David Coulthard.

In 2000, seeking a new challenge, Monaghan joined the Benetton squad, which was in the process of transitioning into the Renault F1 Team. Initially, Monaghan worked as a performance engineer but soon after he joined, he took on the role of Race Engineer for Jenson Button. After Button left the team, Monaghan began working with Renault's exciting new prospect Fernando Alonso, engineering the young Spaniard to his first victory in 2003.

After a brief stint at Jordan Grand Prix, Monaghan joined Red Bull Racing at the end of 2005. Monaghan was initially appointed Head of Race and Test Engineering but over time this has transitioned into the role of Chief Engineer, Car Engineering. This role sees him responsible for extracting maximum performance from the team's machinery across a grand prix weekend and turning racing concepts into performance gains.
