= McLaren MCL38 =

2024 Formula One car

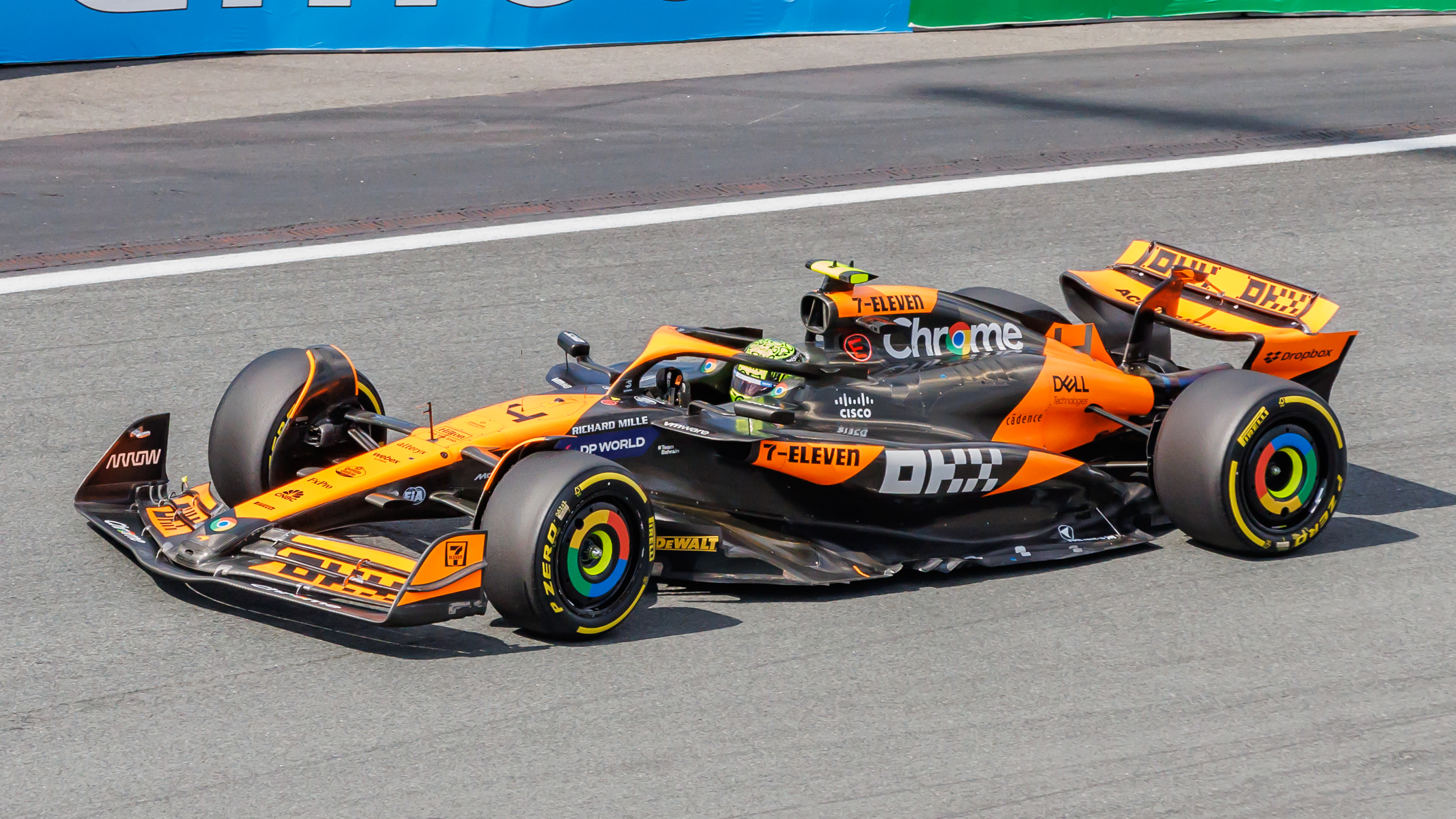
- Lando Norris driving an MCL38 during the Dutch Grand Prix
- Category: Formula One
- Constructor: McLaren
- Designers: Rob Marshall (Chief Designer) (Note: Marshall initially worked as Technical Director, Engineering and Design until the design team was restructured in April 2024.) Other designers: Peter Prodromou (Technical Director, Aerodynamics); Neil Houldey (Technical Director, Engineering) (Note: Houldey joined the design team from April 2024.); Mark Temple (Technical Director, Performance) (Note: Temple joined the design team from May 2024.); Andrea Stella (Technical Director, Performance) (Note: Stella worked on the design team on an interim basis between April and May 2024.); David Sanchez (Technical Director, Car Concept and Performance) (Note: Sanchez worked on the design team from January to April 2024.)
- Predecessor: McLaren MCL60
- Successor: McLaren MCL39

Technical specifications
- Chassis: Carbon fibre composite
- Suspension (front): Carbon fibre and titanium pull-rod suspension legs operating inboard torsion bar and damper system
- Suspension (rear): Carbon fibre and titanium push-rod suspension legs operating inboard torsion bar and damper system
- Engine: Mercedes-AMG F1 M15 E Performance 1.6 L (98 cu in) direct injection V6 turbocharged engine limited to 15,000 RPM in a mid-mounted, rear-wheel drive layout
- Electric motor: Mercedes-AMG Kinetic and thermal energy recovery systems
- Transmission: McLaren 8-speed + 1 reverse sequential seamless semi-automatic transmission operated via paddle shifters with limited slip friction clutch epicyclic differential
- Battery: Lithium-ion battery
- Weight: 798 kg (including driver, excluding fuel)
- Brakes: 6 piston calipers, carbon ventilated discs/pads
- Tyres: Pirelli P Zero (dry); Pirelli Cinturato (wet)
- Clutch: Electro-hydraulically operated, carbon multi-plate

Competition history
- Notable entrants: McLaren F1 Team
- Notable drivers: 4. (United Kingdom) Lando Norris; 81. (Australia) Oscar Piastri
- Debut: 2024 Bahrain Grand Prix
- First win: 2024 Miami Grand Prix
- Last win: 2024 Abu Dhabi Grand Prix
- Last event: 2024 Abu Dhabi Grand Prix
| Races | Wins | Podiums | Poles | F/Laps |
|---|---|---|---|---|
| 24 | 6 | 21 | 8 | 7 |
- Constructors' Championships: 1 (2024)

The McLaren MCL38 is a Formula One car designed and constructed by McLaren under the direction of Rob Marshall to compete in the 2024 Formula One World Championship, in which it won the World Constructors' Championship. The car was driven by Lando Norris and Oscar Piastri, in their sixth and second seasons with the team respectively. Both Norris and Piastri achieved their first Grand Prix wins with the MCL38.

The MCL38 made its competitive début at the 2024 Bahrain Grand Prix; throughout the season, it proved itself to be a competitive car and a significant improvement over its already-accomplished predecessor, the MCL60. An early upgrade package improved its performance in slow-speed corners, addressing a long-standing weakness of McLaren cars. The car achieved six race victories, fifteen other podiums, eight poles, three sprint poles, two sprint wins, five other sprint podiums, and seven fastest laps (two being track records), all en route to McLaren's first Constructors' Championship since 1998.

The MCL38 was the first McLaren car to win a Grand Prix since the MCL35M in 2021 and the first since the MP4-27 in 2012 to win multiple Grands Prix in a single season. It was also the first McLaren car since the MP4-29 in 2014 to lead the Constructors' Championship and the first since the MP4/13 in 1998 to win it, doing so at the 2024 Abu Dhabi Grand Prix. Commentators generally agreed that the MCL38 did not achieve its optimum results, particularly in regards to Norris's curtailed challenge for the World Drivers' Championship following driver and team error. Regardless, the MCL38 was consistently amongst the quickest Formula One cars of the 2024 season and exceeded McLaren's expectations. The MCL38 was the first championship-winning Formula One car to use customer engines since the Brawn BGP 001 in 2009.

== Background ==
=== Development context ===
The MCL38's predecessor, the MCL60, was initially designed by then-technical director James Key. It became apparent early in the 2023 season that the initial specification of the MCL60 was highly uncompetitive, and as a result Key left the team. Existing employees Peter Prodromou and Neil Houldey were promoted to lead the design department. David Sanchez was hired from Scuderia Ferrari as part of the technical restructure, but was placed on gardening leave until the beginning of 2024; he left the position in April 2024, three months into his contract.

Following Key's departure from the team, the new technical team implemented several rounds of mid-season upgrades for the MCL60 that resulted in a turnaround for the team's performance. Journalist Lawrence Barretto observed that the radical changes on the MCL60 had opened up ample development opportunities for McLaren to pursue on the MCL38.

=== Early development ===
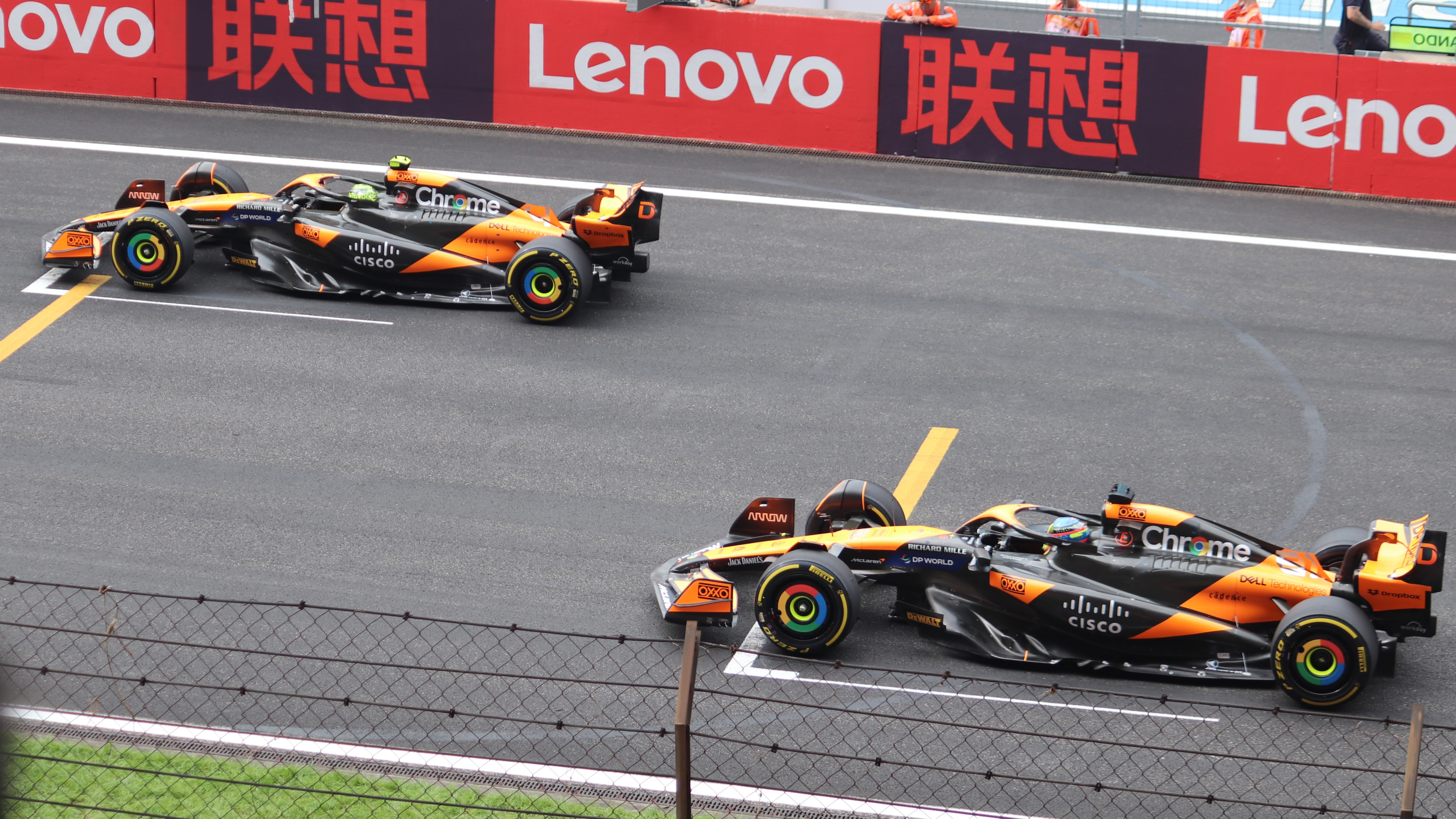
Norris (left) and Piastri (right) on the grid before the Chinese Grand Prix

McLaren had previously used a wind tunnel in Cologne owned by Toyota Gazoo Racing Europe and previously used by the Toyota Formula One Team. This arrangement posed a major challenge for the team, as parts had to be shipped from the McLaren Technology Centre in Woking, England to Germany in order to be tested. The team had invested in a wind tunnel of their own, which had been delayed by the COVID-19 pandemic. McLaren began development of the MCL38 in July 2023. The wind tunnel was ready for operations in August, and models began to be tested in the tunnel that same month. McLaren reported good correlation as well as cost and time savings. Team principal Andrea Stella said in September 2023 that early data was encouraging, but stressed that McLaren couldn't know how fast they were developing compared to other teams.

Of particular concern was driveability, which long-time driver Norris had observed was poor in all McLarens he had driven. Stella speculated that although the mid-season upgrades delivered to the MCL60 radically improved performance, they may have introduced undesirable handling traits which would have to be investigated during the development of the MCL38. Some of these driveability improvements were installed on the launch specification, but others were delivered later in the season. Further, Stella said that the development programme would prioritise improving tyre degradation, McLaren's main weakness compared to field-leading Red Bull Racing, which would require mechanical as well as aerodynamic changes.

McLaren Racing CEO Zak Brown said that the team wanted to start the 2024 season where it had finished the 2023 season, and stated that he was optimistic about the MCL38's development. Stella said McLaren's focus was on achieving their development goals rather than a specific result, and said that the team had not hit a point of diminishing returns and found its progress to still be linear and sustainable. Stella theorised that McLaren may still struggle to match Red Bull Racing, who dominated the 2023 season, suggesting that Red Bull's lack of upgrades in 2023 meant they had built up a substantial backlog of improvements.

According to Stella, the team set three main goals for the MCL38: improving aerodynamic efficiency, mechanical grip, and tyre performance. The car as initially presented to the public had several areas concealed. However, the MCL38 at its launch featured new front brake duct inlets, sidepod inlets, floor edge, and revised suspension layouts for the front and rear. Gary Anderson, writing for The Race, concluded that the changes visible on the launch specification car were intended to produce more controlled suspension, improving the MCL38's aerodynamic profile.

=== Liveries ===
The Monaco Grand Prix special livery pictured on show car at the Goodwood Festival of Speed

The MCL38 featured a livery similar to the one used on the MCL36 and MCL60, dominated by papaya orange and exposed carbon fibre (which McLaren referred to as anthracite). Two changes were inspired by one-off variant liveries used on the MCL60: the increase in exposed carbon fibre which was used in the "Stealth Mode" livery, and the use of chrome elements as in the British Grand Prix livery. The livery does not include any blue, which had been a prominent feature of every full-season McLaren livery since the MCL33 which competed in 2018.

McLaren again collaborated with sponsor Vuse to run a special livery featuring the work of a local artist, in this case a design by MILTZ for the Japanese Grand Prix. A second special livery – in the colours of the flag of Brazil (yellow, green, and blue) – was used for the Monaco Grand Prix to mark the thirtieth anniversary of the death of Ayrton Senna, who won his three World Drivers' Championships with the team. A third special livery inspired by the team's "MP4 era" titled "Legend Reborn" and sponsored by OKX was introduced for the Singapore Grand Prix. It replaced the anthracite with white to evoke the McLaren liveries of 1981–86. The Google Chrome chrome livery, which was last used at the 2023 British Grand Prix, returned for the 2024 United States Grand Prix.

== Competition and development history ==
=== Pre-season ===
Stella stated that not all the new developments McLaren had planned for the MCL38 had been ready in time for the launch specification car, but would become early season upgrades.

The car first ran on track during a filming day at Silverstone Circuit in February, driven by both drivers ahead of the official pre-season test at Bahrain International Circuit. Stella said that the MCL38 performed as expected during the pre-season test, and that its most significant gain over the MCL60 was its increased rear grip.

=== Opening rounds ===
The MCL38 featured a new front wing, sidepod inlet, floor, engine cover, and beam (Note: The beam wing is a secondary aerodynamic device located below the rear wing. It complements the rear wing by creating a low-pressure area at the rear of the car. This accelerates the rate of airflow through the venturi tunnels, increasing the downforce generated by the ground effect.) and rear wings for the Bahrain Grand Prix. Norris qualified seventh and finished sixth, while Piastri qualified and finished eighth. Both drivers suggested they could have qualified in the top three had they set error-free laps. The result meant Norris and Piastri left the opening round in sixth and eighth respectively in the World Drivers' Championship (WDC), while McLaren was classified fourth in the World Constructors' Championship (WCC).

The car was fitted with modified rear and beam wings for the Saudi Arabian Grand Prix. Piastri qualified fifth and finished fourth, while Norris qualified sixth and finished eighth. The drivers respectively moved up to fifth and down to eighth in the WDC, while McLaren moved up to third in the WCC.

Norris qualified fourth and Piastri sixth for the Australian Grand Prix, and were both promoted a place on the starting grid by a penalty for another driver. Norris finished third and Piastri fourth, a result which moved Norris up to sixth in the WDC.

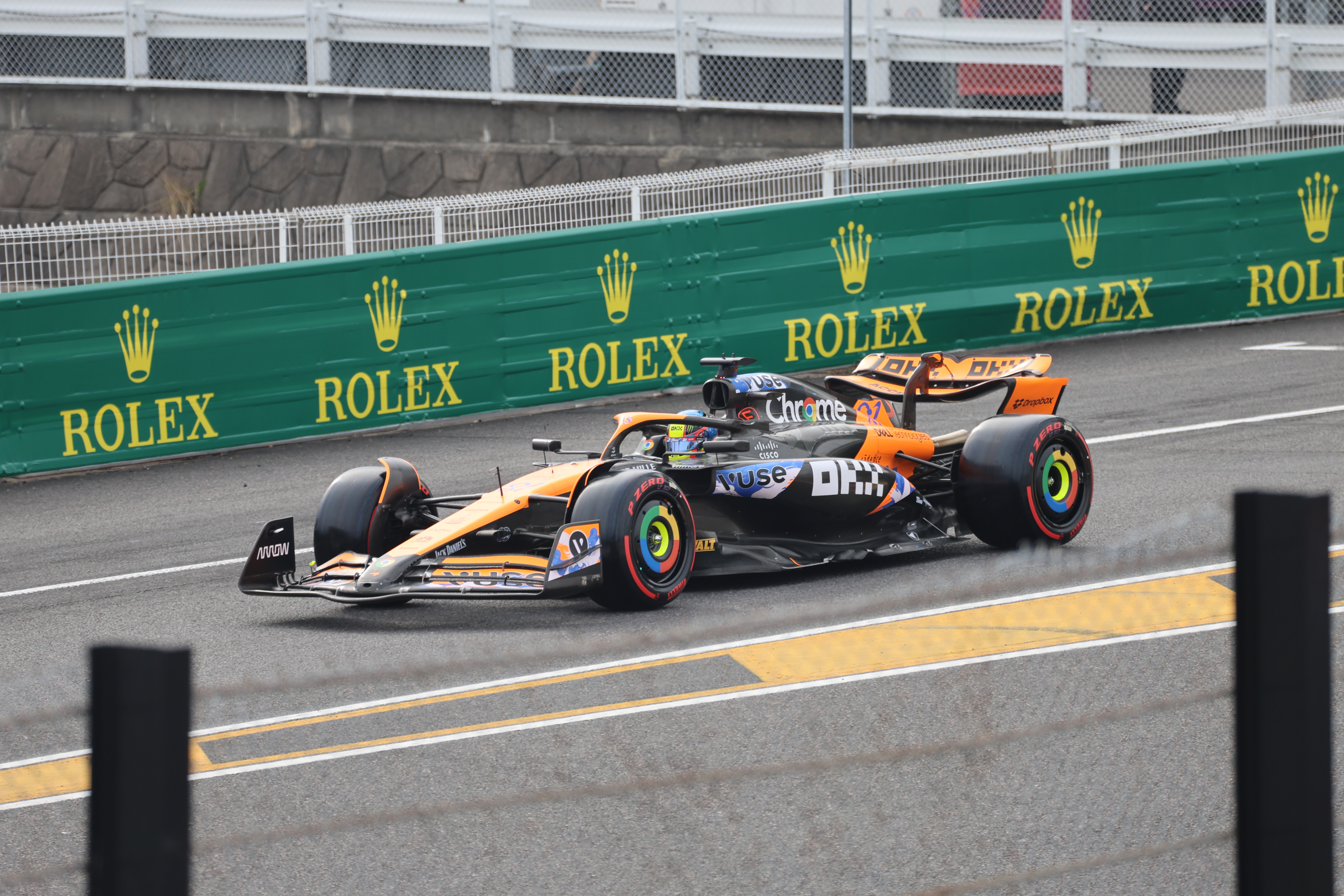
Piastri driving his MILTZ-liveried MCL38 during practice for the Japanese Grand Prix

The MCL38 featured a special livery for the Japanese Grand Prix (see § Liveries), and McLaren fitted the car with new front brake duct inlets. Norris qualified third but finished fifth. Piastri qualified sixth and finished eighth, losing places late in the race after making an error. In the WDC, Norris overtook Piastri for fifth.

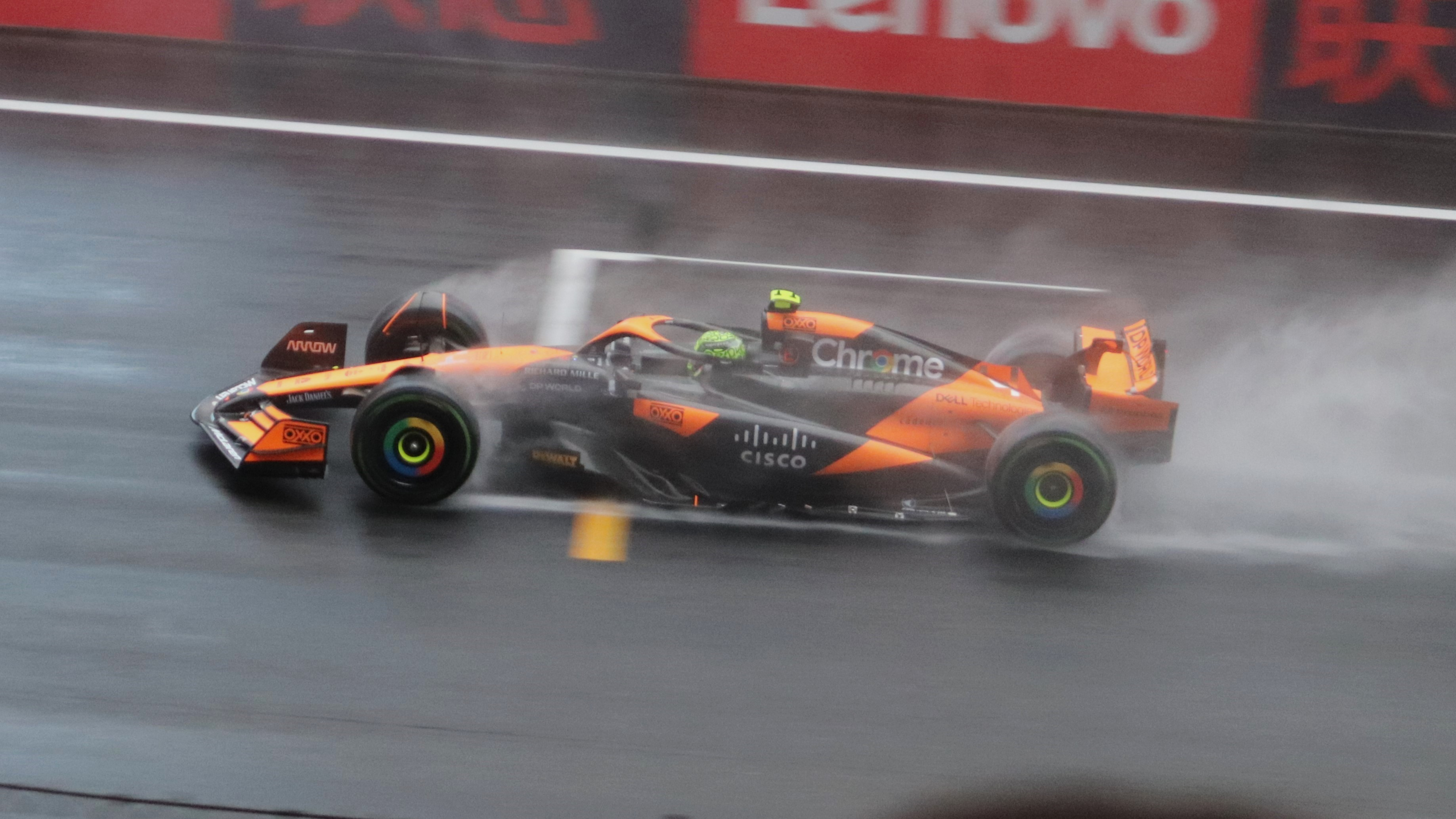
Norris during sprint qualifying for the Chinese Grand Prix, in which he took pole

McLaren expected that the car would be uncompetitive at the Chinese Grand Prix given the quantity of low-speed corners at Shanghai International Circuit, in which the MCL38 typically underperformed (see § Assessment and characteristics). In a wet sprint qualifying session, Norris qualified on pole position. Piastri, who qualified eighth for the sprint, suffered an issue with his car's transmission, which malfunctioned and shifted into neutral during his qualifying lap. In the sprint, Norris had a poor start and finished sixth, and Piastri finished seventh. For the Grand Prix, Norris and Piastri qualified fourth and fifth respectively. In a race twice interrupted by safety car periods, Norris moved up to finish second. Piastri, however, was struck by Daniel Ricciardo, and finished eighth with significant damage to his diffuser.

=== Miami upgrade package ===
At the Miami Grand Prix, McLaren introduced a range of upgrades to the MCL38. This included a new front wing, new front suspension geometry and updated rear suspension, revised front and rear brake ducts and winglets, new floor, revised sidepod inlet, and a new engine cover and bodywork including a new louvre arrangement. Aside from these performance upgrades, the car also featured a circuit-specific beam wing. Brown called the upgraded MCL38 "almost a B-spec car", and McLaren expected the upgrades to improve the car's performance across all conditions. Norris's car had all of the upgrades, while Piastri's had roughly half. Piastri qualified sixth for the sprint, and Norris qualified ninth. Piastri finished the sprint in sixth, whilst Norris did not finish after a first-lap incident with Stroll. Norris and Alonso both blamed Hamilton for the incident. Norris and Piastri qualified fifth and sixth respectively for the Grand Prix. During the race, a pit stop cycle moved Norris into the lead, just as a safety car was called for a collision between two other cars. Norris pitted under the safety car and defended his lead to the end of the race, achieving his first Grand Prix win. Piastri was involved in several close battles with Carlos Sainz Jr., one of which resulted in damage to Piastri's front wing which required an additional pit stop, and a penalty for Sainz. Piastri set the fastest lap of the race, but finished fourteenth and was promoted one place after a penalty for another driver. The results of the weekend meant Norris drew level on points with Sainz, and took fourth place in the WDC on the countback.

The MCL38 was fitted with circuit-specific beam and rear wings for the Emilia Romagna Grand Prix, and Piastri's car received the remaining upgrades. Piastri qualified second and Norris third, but Piastri was given a three-place grid penalty for impeding Kevin Magnussen: Piastri started fifth, and Norris second. Norris finished second and Piastri fourth.

The car featured a special livery for the Monaco Grand Prix (see § Liveries). McLaren fitted circuit-specific beam and rear wings to suit the high downforce requirements of the Circuit de Monaco. Piastri and Norris qualified second and fourth respectively, and they finished in the same positions. Norris moved up to third in the WDC.

For the Canadian Grand Prix, Norris qualified third and Piastri fourth. Norris worked his way into the lead of the race, but missed the pit entry when the first safety car was called and rejoined third. He finished second, while Piastri finished fifth after losing positions to George Russell and Hamilton in the closing stages of the race.

=== Mid-season European rounds ===
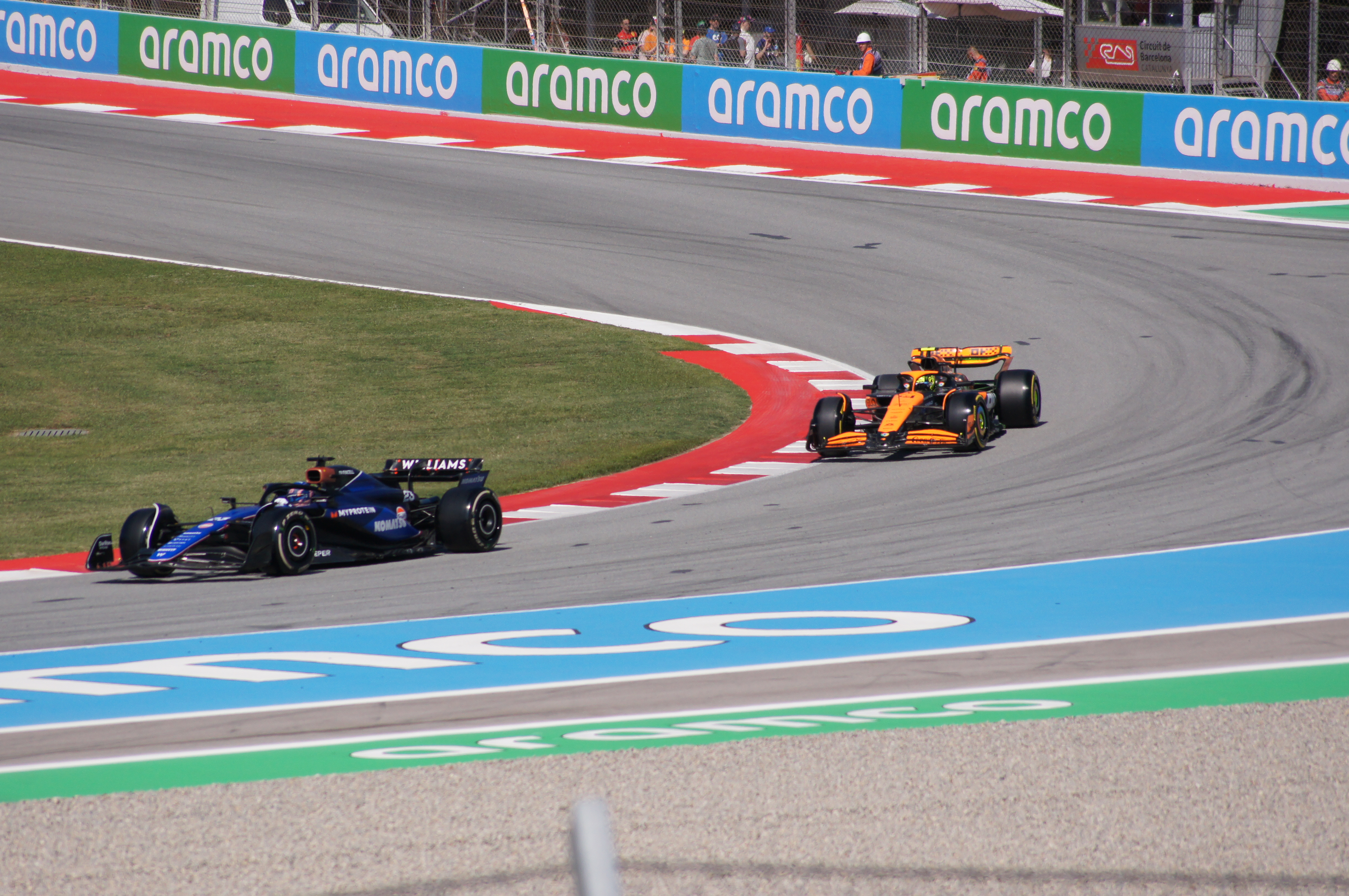
Norris and Alex Albon during free practice for the Spanish Grand Prix

Norris qualified on pole position for the Spanish Grand Prix. Piastri qualified tenth as he failed to set a lap time in the final stage of qualifying due to a driver error, starting ninth after a penalty for another driver. Norris lost the lead on the start but recovered to finish second and set the fastest lap, and Piastri improved to finish seventh. Following the race, Sainz said he considered the MCL38 the fastest and most consistent car, whilst Stella and Red Bull team principal Christian Horner believed it was evenly matched with the Red Bull Racing RB20. The result moved Norris up to second in the WDC.

The MCL38 was fitted with a new front wing and front suspension for the Austrian Grand Prix, with the intention of better balancing its performance through different corner types. Norris and Piastri qualified second and third respectively for the sprint, and they swapped positions in the sprint itself. For the Grand Prix, Norris qualified second and Piastri seventh, the latter losing his final lap time due to a track limits violation. Norris and Verstappen raced closely for the lead in the final stages of the race until a collision between the two: Norris suffered a puncture and terminal damage to his car, while Verstappen suffered a puncture and received a penalty for the incident. Piastri was a beneficiary of the incident, and improved to finish second. Norris was classified twentieth as he had completed more than 90% of the race distance.

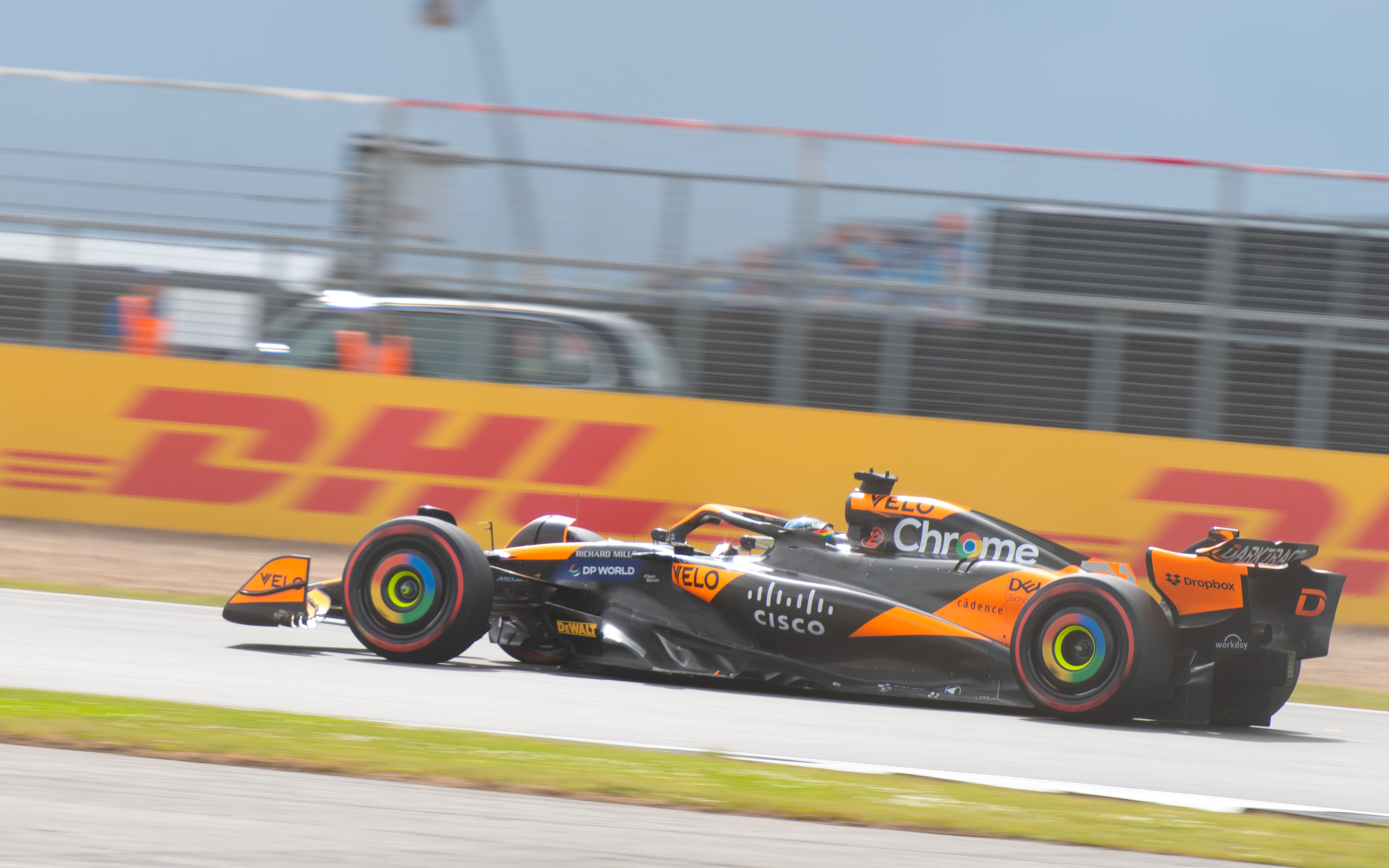
Piastri during free practice for the British Grand Prix

McLaren fitted a new rear wing assembly designed for a higher top speed to the car, alongside a different engine cover and cooling arrangement, for the 2024 British Grand Prix. Norris qualified third and Piastri fifth. During the race, three significant errors were made. Firstly, McLaren did not double-stack (Note: A strategic choice to pit both drivers on the same lap, servicing one immediately after the other.) the drivers during the first pit stop cycle. Secondly, Norris overshot the pit mark during his second stop, causing delays, and thirdly, McLaren chose to fit his car with soft tyres rather than the better-performing mediums. Norris finished third and Piastri fourth, with the latter moving up to fifth in the WDC.

The car remained at the Silverstone Circuit after the race to test 2025 tyre prototypes for sole supplier Pirelli. Mick Schumacher, one of McLaren's reserve drivers, completed 53 laps on the first day, while Norris completed 95 on the second. Both days of the test were held in wet conditions.

Norris qualified on pole and Piastri second for the Hungarian Grand Prix, McLaren's first front-row lock-out since 2012. Piastri had a better start than Norris and moved into first place, but lost the position during the second round of pit stops. Norris was instructed to return the position to Piastri, but instead created a substantial gap of six seconds to Piastri, before eventually slowing and returning the position and allowing Piastri to take his first Grand Prix win. Piastri and Norris finishing first and second was McLaren's first 1–2 finish since 2021, and meant the team overtook Ferrari for second in the WCC.

For the Belgian Grand Prix, Norris qualified fifth and Piastri sixth; both started one place higher after a grid penalty for Verstappen. Norris ran wide on the opening lap, compromising his performance for the rest of the race, and finished sixth. Piastri improved to third. Both drivers were promoted a place when Russell, who had won the race, was disqualified. Piastri moved up to fourth in the WDC.

=== Post-summer break and Dutch upgrade package ===
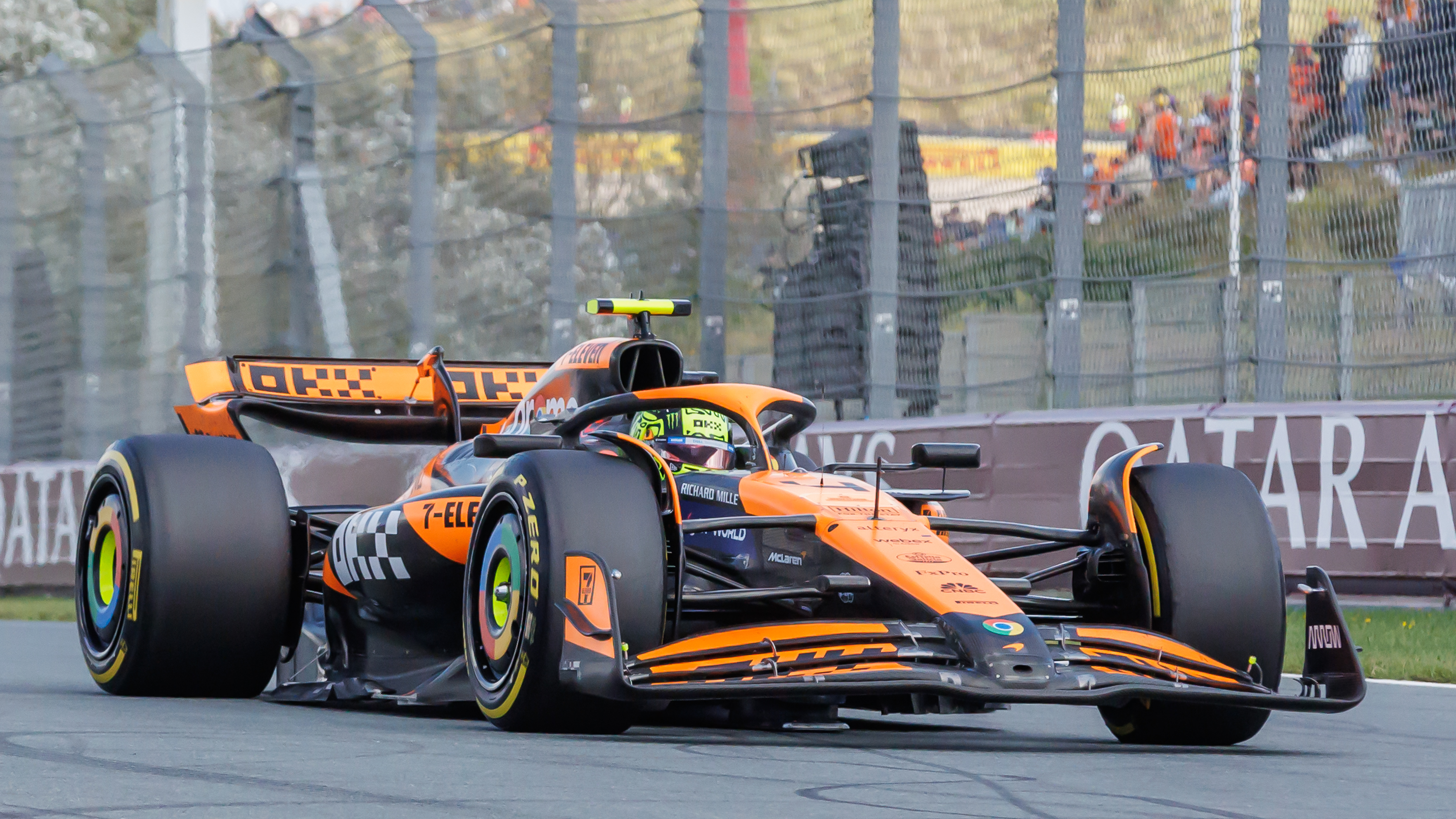
Norris during the Dutch Grand Prix, where he won from pole position

Returning from the summer break, McLaren introduced a new package of upgrades for the Dutch Grand Prix. This package included a new brake scoop, front and rear suspension, floor and edge wing, and beam and rear wings. Norris qualified on pole, and Piastri third. Norris lost the lead on the first lap to Verstappen, but recovered it and won the race and set the fastest lap. Piastri finished fourth.

The MCL38 was run with circuit-specific front and rear wings for the Italian Grand Prix, and a new sidepod design was introduced to complement the changes made at the Dutch Grand Prix. Norris qualified on pole and Piastri second. Following qualifying, Norris highlighted the MCL38's significant improvement in performance over the MCL60, with the car approximately 20 km/h (12 mph) quicker in a straight line. Norris was overtaken by Piastri on the first lap, and were ultimately beaten by Ferrari's Charles Leclerc who selected a single-stop strategy rather than McLaren's two-stop. Piastri and Norris finished second and third respectively, with the latter setting the fastest lap.

Piastri qualified second for Azerbaijan Grand Prix, whilst Norris's final lap in the first stage of qualifying was affected by yellow flags, forcing him to abort the lap. Norris qualified seventeenth, ending the MCL38's perfect record of qualifying in the top ten. Norris was promoted to fifteenth on the starting grid due to penalties for other drivers. Piastri won the race, while Norris recovered to fourth and set the fastest lap of the race. The result moved McLaren into first place in the WCC, marking the first time McLaren led the championship since the 2014 Australian Grand Prix.

During the Azerbaijan Grand Prix, several observers noted that the MCL38's rear wing was designed to be flexible in such a way that the bottom corners of the upper panel lifted up to allow airflow through. This mimicked the behaviour of the drag reduction system (DRS), even when the car was not in a DRS zone or entitled to have its DRS open. Retrospective investigation revealed the wing, whose behaviour was nicknamed "mini-DRS", was one of the designs introduced at the Belgian Grand Prix, before being used for the Italian and Azerbaijan Grands Prix. The Fédération Internationale de l'Automobile confirmed the design was legal under existing regulations but asked McLaren to modify the wing to prevent the flexing, to which the team agreed. Stella said the team was pleased its rivals had invested resources examining what he called "a red herring." Engineering director Neil Houldey later called the controversy a "point of pride" and proof of McLaren's technical innovation.

McLaren ran the car with track-specific beam wing for the Singapore Grand Prix, and used a special livery (see § Liveries). Unusually, the rear and beam wings used were of a low downforce specification, despite Marina Bay Street Circuit typically being considered a high-downforce track. Norris qualified on pole and Piastri in fifth place. Norris led the entire race and won, while Piastri improved to finish third.

=== Closing rounds and championship push ===
The car was raced in a special chrome livery for the United States Grand Prix. McLaren also débuted a new front wing, front and rear suspension, front and rear brake ducts, and beam wing. For the sprint race, Norris qualified fourth and finished third. Piastri, who lost his qualifying lap due to a track limits violation, qualified sixteenth and improved to finish tenth in the sprint. Norris qualified on pole and Piastri fifth for the Grand Prix. Piastri finished the race fifth. Norris lost several positions on the opening lap, and recovered to finish third. The stewards judged that his final overtake on Verstappen, which was performed after both ran wide, meant he had gained an unfair advantage, and awarded Norris a five-second penalty that dropped him to fourth place.

Pato O'Ward, a driver for the Arrow McLaren IndyCar team, drove in place of Norris during the first free practice session for the Mexico City Grand Prix. The MCL38 was fitted with circuit-specific cooling elements to account for the high altitude of the Autódromo Hermanos Rodríguez. O'Ward and Norris also tested a completely revised floor in free practice. Norris qualified third and Piastri seventeenth. In the race, Norris finished second, and Piastri recovered to finish eighth. Technical analyst Giorgio Piola and journalist Mark Hughes said the MCL38's superior brake duct design was a key factor enabling Norris to overtake Leclerc's Ferrari SF-24.

McLaren developed a new circuit-specific medium-downforce rear wing to use for the São Paulo Grand Prix, and introduced two complementary beam wing options. Although McLaren ran the new wings in the sprint sessions, they reverted to using high-downforce wings for the race. In sprint qualifying, Piastri qualified on pole and Norris second. The drivers followed team orders to swap positions during the sprint, Norris winning and Piastri finishing second. Qualifying was held in wet and rainy conditions and was interrupted by numerous yellow and red flags: Norris qualified on pole, and Piastri eighth. The race was chaotic, held in wet and rainy conditions. Norris was handed a reprimand for violating the race start procedure, as it was aborted after another driver beached their car. Norris, who started on pole position, initially lost position to Russell, and lost further positions after each safety car restart, and ultimately finished sixth. Verstappen, his WDC rival, won the race from seventeenth, effectively ending Norris's chances of winning the WDC. Piastri finished seventh, but received a penalty for contact with Liam Lawson and was demoted to eighth.

The car was run with a low-downforce rear wing and a complementary front wing flap for the Las Vegas Grand Prix. Norris qualified sixth and Piastri eighth. Norris finished sixth, losing any mathematical chance of beating Verstappen to the WDC. Piastri was given a five-second time penalty for overshooting his starting position, ultimately finishing seventh. Norris also set the fastest lap of the race and the track record for the Las Vegas Strip Circuit, which had previously been held by Piastri who set it in the 2023 event in the MCL60.

For the sprint event at the Qatar Grand Prix, Norris qualified on pole and Piastri third. Norris, returning the favoured afforded by Piastri at the São Paulo Grand Prix, allowed Piastri to pass him to win the sprint race just before crossing the finish line. For the race, Norris qualified third and Piastri fourth. Norris was trailing race winner Verstappen for the first half of the race before he failed to slow under double-waved yellow flags due to a stray wing mirror on the track, facilitating a ten-second stop/go penalty. He served the penalty and recovered to tenth, with Piastri in third.

McLaren development driver Ryō Hirakawa replaced Piastri for the first free practice session of the Abu Dhabi Grand Prix. Norris qualified on pole position and won the race; Piastri finished tenth after being involved in a collision with Verstappen on the opening lap. Norris finished the season second in the WDC, and Piastri fourth. Most significantly, the result secured the WCC for McLaren, their first since 1998, narrowly beating Ferrari.

The MCL38 remained at Yas Marina Circuit following the race for the annual end-of-season test sessions. Norris and Piastri each spent half a day testing Pirelli's proposed 2025 tyres, recording 84 and 72 laps respectively. O'Ward tested the car in its ordinary specification, completing 116 laps.

== Assessment and characteristics ==
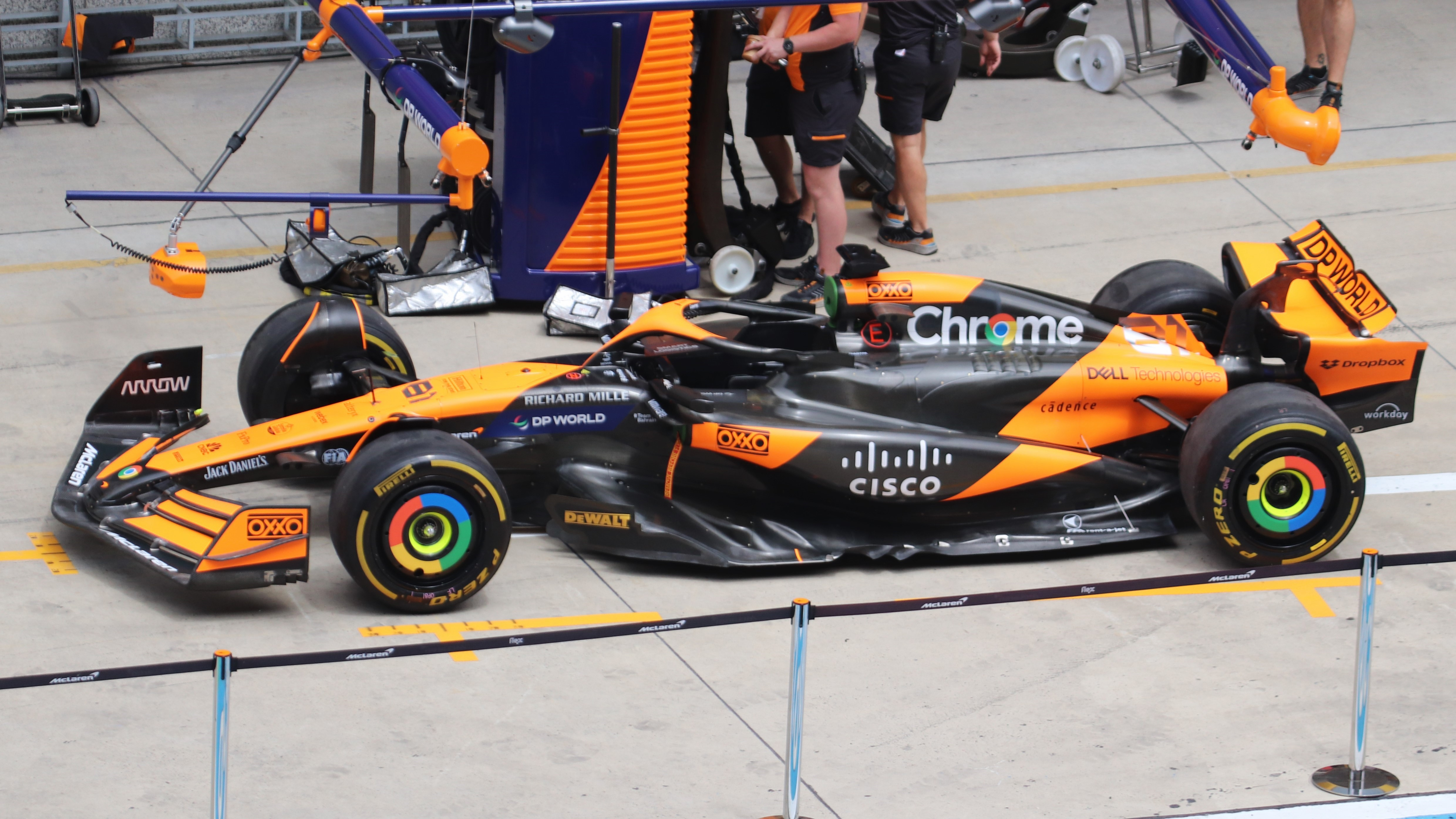
Piastri's MCL38 displayed in the pit lane at the Chinese Grand Prix.

In the car's early races it exhibited strong performance in medium- and high-speed corners and proved a significant improvement over the early-season MCL60. It also displayed a lack of top speed, an inefficient drag reduction system, and poor performance in longer corners. Compared to its nearest competitor – Ferrari's SF-24 – the MCL38 lacked race pace largely due to the SF-24's superior tyre management, but excelled over a qualifying lap. The MCL38 proved to be the overall third-fastest car early in the season.

Performance in slow-speed corners improved with the implementation of the Miami upgrade package, to the extent that the team needed to investigate why the package had been so much more successful than expected. McLaren had intended for the upgrade to increase downforce across all conditions and the upgrade did achieve the increase modelled by the factory, but it had not expected it to lead to such a noticeable gain in an area that had been a weakness for recent McLaren cars. Although Stella said the improvement was down to technical changes, he speculated at least some could be attributed to the drivers having greater confidence in the car, calling the improvement in handling an "intangible benefit" that couldn't be modelled in factory simulations. By the British Grand Prix, it had established its place as the all-round best performing car. Looking at the rate of development, Norris said "it is incredible. We've out-developed by a mile all of our competition", and Piastri said the MCL38 was "much more well-rounded" and that the team could "put the car on track anywhere and be confident we will be maybe not the fastest but one of the fastest". Throughout the year, McLaren benefited from their larger allocation of aerodynamic testing time: given they finished fourth in the 2023 WCC, McLaren were awarded the most testing time of any of the top four teams. For example, McLaren developed eight rear wings and fourteen beam wings for the car, far more than any of its rivals. Whilst the car had a generally wide operating window, McLaren's ability to tailor the car to specific circuits was a significant advantage. The MCL38's design was influential: for example, Haas adopted the MCL38's distinctive sidepod inlet design on their VF-24. Its flexible front wing – later adopted by Mercedes – resolved an important balance issue between the front and rear common on this era of Formula One cars, and rendered Red Bull's solution "obsolete". Red Bull could not afford to adopt this solution while remaining within the budget cap, and its pursuit of increased downforce as an alternative solution led it to increase instability in its car and ultimately eliminated it from WCC contention.

Also significant were the developments McLaren chose not to introduce or to delay. Although the team developed a new floor as part of its Miami package, it did not introduce a second revision despite its modelling indicating the new floor would improve the MCL38's downforce. McLaren's competitors in the early season, particularly Ferrari and Aston Martin, introduced floor upgrades in pursuit of increased downforce but sacrificed driveability and ultimately lap time as a result. Michael Schmidt, writing for Auto Motor und Sport, noted that every one of McLaren's upgrades since the package introduced to the MCL60 at the 2023 Austrian Grand Prix had worked immediately and as expected. Most other teams had to reduce the pace of upgrades and use repaired instead of new parts due to the mounting cost of accident damage (Mercedes stopped upgrades to their W15 entirely) – Norris and Piastri had clean seasons with no major incidents.

Commentators have generally agreed the MCL38 has not achieved its best possible results, arguing that a range of strategic errors by McLaren, as well as mistakes by its two drivers, hindered its performance. After the British Grand Prix (the twelfth race of the season) Alex Kalinauckas of Motorsport.com, the editors of The Race, Luke Slater of The Telegraph, and Nigel Chiu of Sky Sports F1 all wrote that McLaren could have won an additional five races with the MCL38 had these errors not been made, and that Norris and McLaren could have been serious contenders for the World Championships. Stella later defended the team, saying it was "not familiar with this [more competitive] position", and Norris said he would still consider the season a success regardless of whether or not he won the WDC. After the São Paulo Grand Prix, at which Verstappen effectively secured the WDC, Stella said that McLaren's only concern as a team was always the WCC, and Norris said that he had always believed it would be "a long shot" to overtake Verstappen on points. Norris's consistently good results after the Miami Grand Prix brought him close to overtaking Verstappen, but the latter's early dominance in the season proved insurmountable. Stella said the team's success was not because the MCL38 was the fastest car, but because it had been "the best car at a few events." In a retrospective analysis of McLaren's season, former Formula One strategist Bernadette Collins concluded that Norris could have won the WDC with a strategically perfect season, noting that although Verstappen and Red Bull also did not maximise their potential, more of Verstappen's losses were due to reliability issues. McLaren had no issues with mechanical reliability, scoring points on 46 of 48 occasions.

The MCL38 winning the WCC was the first for a customer team since Brawn GP won the 2009 titles with the BGP 001, challenging the conventional assumption that a team would need its own or a purpose-built engine to win a championship, particularly after the introduction of the complex turbo-hybrid power units in 2014. Previously, several senior McLaren staff had made similar statements, including Ron Dennis and Éric Boullier. Stella called the "conviction that you need to be a works team [...] more of an excuse than a technical fact." Others argued Dennis and Bouiller made their comments before the FIA mandated parity between the engines used by works teams and those supplied to their customers, which began in 2018.

The car won International Competition Car of the Year at the 2025 Autosport Awards.

== Complete Formula One results ==
Key

Key
| Colour | Result |
|---|---|
| Gold | Winner |
| Silver | Second place |
| Bronze | Third place |
| Green | Other points position |
| Blue | Other classified position |
| Blue | Not classified, finished (NC) |
| Purple | Not classified, retired (Ret) |
| Red | Did not qualify (DNQ) |
| Black | Disqualified (DSQ) |
| White | Did not start (DNS) |
| White | Race cancelled (C) |
| Blank | Did not practice (DNP) |
| Blank | Excluded (EX) |
| Blank | Did not arrive (DNA) |
| Blank | Withdrawn (WD) |
| Blank | Did not enter (empty cell) |
| Annotation | Meaning |
| P | Pole position |
| F | Fastest lap |
| Superscript number | Points-scoring position in sprint |

| Year | Entrant | Engine | Tyres | Drivers | Grands Prix | | | | | | | | | | | | | | | | | | | | | | | | Points | WCC |
| Year | Entrant | Engine | Tyres | Drivers | BHR | SAU | AUS | JPN | CHN | MIA | EMI | MON | CAN | ESP | AUT | GBR | HUN | BEL | NED | ITA | AZE | SIN | USA | MXC | SAP | LVG | QAT | ABU | Points | WCC |
|---|---|---|---|---|---|---|---|---|---|---|---|---|---|---|---|---|---|---|---|---|---|---|---|---|---|---|---|---|---|---|
| 2024 | McLaren F1 Team | Mercedes-AMG; F1 M15 E Performance; 1.6 V6 t | P | (United Kingdom) Lando Norris | 6 | 8 | 3 | 5 | 2^{6} | 1 | 2 | 4 | 2 | 2^{P}^{F} | 20†^{3} | 3 | 2^{P} | 5 | 1^{P}^{F} | 3^{P}^{F} | 4^{F} | 1^{P} | 4^{3 P} | 2 | 6^{1 P} | 6^{F} | 10^{2 F} | 1^{P} | 666 | 1st |
| 2024 | McLaren F1 Team | Mercedes-AMG; F1 M15 E Performance; 1.6 V6 t | P | (Australia) Oscar Piastri | 8 | 4 | 4 | 8 | 8^{7} | 13^{6 F} | 4 | 2 | 5 | 7 | 2^{2} | 4 | 1 | 2 | 4 | 2 | 1 | 3 | 5 | 8 | 8^{2} | 7 | 3^{1} | 10 | 666 | 1st |

- † – Norris did not finish the Grand Prix, but was classified as he completed more than 90% of the race distance.
