= McLaren MCL60 =

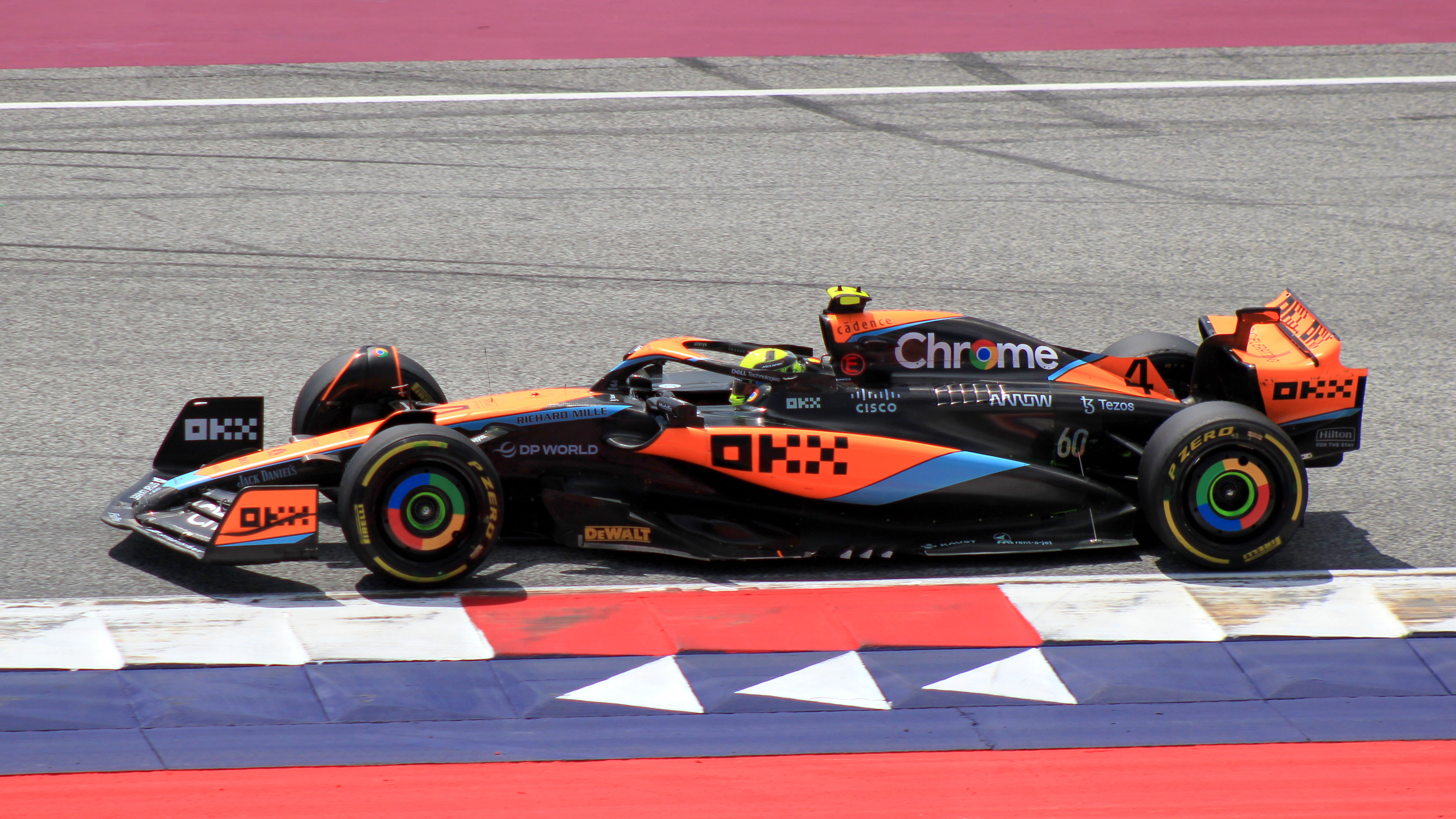
- Lando Norris driving an MCL60 during the Austrian Grand Prix
- Category: Formula One
- Constructor: McLaren
- Designers: James Key (Technical Director, initial specification only); Peter Prodromou and Neil Houldey (updated specification)
- Predecessor: McLaren MCL36
- Successor: McLaren MCL38

Technical specifications
- Chassis: Carbon fibre composite
- Suspension (front): Carbon fibre and titanium pullrod suspension legs operating inboard torsion bar and damper system
- Suspension (rear): Carbon fibre and titanium pushrod suspension legs operating inboard torsion bar and damper system
- Engine: Mercedes-AMG F1 M14 E Performance 1.6 L (98 cu in) direct injection V6 turbocharged engine limited to 15,000 RPM in a mid-mounted, rear-wheel drive layout
- Electric motor: Mercedes-AMG Kinetic and thermal energy recovery systems
- Transmission: McLaren 8-speed + 1 reverse sequential seamless semi-automatic transmission operated via paddle shifters with limited slip friction clutch epicyclic differential
- Battery: Lithium-ion battery
- Weight: 798 kg (including driver, excluding fuel)
- Brakes: 6 piston calipers, carbon ventilated discs/pads
- Tyres: Pirelli P Zero (dry); Pirelli Cinturato (wet)
- Clutch: Electro-hydraulically operated, carbon multi-plate

Competition history
- Notable entrants: McLaren F1 Team
- Notable drivers: 4. (United Kingdom) Lando Norris; 81. (Australia) Oscar Piastri
- Debut: 2023 Bahrain Grand Prix
- Last event: 2023 Abu Dhabi Grand Prix
| Races | Podiums | F/Laps |
|---|---|---|
| 22 | 9 | 3 |

The McLaren MCL60 is a Formula One car designed and constructed by McLaren, initially under the direction of James Key, to compete in the 2023 Formula One World Championship.

The car made its competitive début at the 2023 Bahrain Grand Prix. It was driven by Lando Norris and Oscar Piastri, Norris for his fifth season with McLaren and Piastri in his rookie year. The initial specification of the MCL60 proved uncompetitive, exhibiting inefficient and draggy aerodynamic performance and high tyre degradation. Its poor performance led to Key's departure from the team in March 2023, and he was replaced by a new structure of technical directors. Peter Prodromou and Neil Houldey took over the development of the MCL60. An upgrade package delivered at the Azerbaijan Grand Prix, the fourth round of the season, was the final development produced under Key's leadership.

Beginning with the Austrian Grand Prix, the ninth round of the championship, the new technical leadership delivered a significant upgrade package to the car, which began a marked improvement in the team's results. Another substantial package was delivered at the Singapore Grand Prix. Once the initial Austrian–British package had been fitted, the MCL60 went on to achieve nine podiums and three fastest laps in Grands Prix. Further, the car achieved two sprint poles and four sprint podiums including one victory. By the season's end, the MCL60 was noted as a capable and competitive all-rounder and the only consistent challenger to Red Bull Racing's dominant RB19. Its remaining shortcomings were primarily its comparatively poorer tyre management and tricky handling. The change in design direction was praised as highly effective and successful to a degree not seen in modern Formula One and appeared to influence the development programs of several other teams.

== Background ==
=== Name ===
The car was originally referred to by McLaren and the press as the MCL37, a continuation of the numbering scheme that began in 1981 with the McLaren MP4/1 (although the MP4 prefix was replaced by MCL in 2017 following the departure of Ron Dennis from the team). However, McLaren announced that the car would be named the MCL60 to commemorate 60 years since Bruce McLaren founded the team in 1963.

=== Development context ===
A new generation of technical regulations began in the 2022 season. The MCL36, the MCL60's immediate predecessor, appeared competitive during its first testing appearance yet proved to have a significant issue with brake overheating. These issues limited its performance capabilities in the early stages of the season and delayed much of the car's development.

Then-team principal Andreas Seidl stated in September 2022 that only part of the MCL36's concept would be continued in its successor. Technical director James Key said the team hoped the MCL60 would require less in-season development compared to the MCL36. However, Key later revealed that the team had realised in September 2022 that the regulation changes to floor height would have an unavoidable negative impact on the car given its overall design philosophy, and began work on a new concept. However, the new concept had not matured enough to be used at launch and it was delayed for introduction during the early season.

In November 2022, Seidl stated he believed the team's struggles with the MCL36 would have an impact on the MCL60, namely that the lack of testing for the MCL36 and the time required to address its brake issues had delayed the start of development for the MCL60. Seidl, who was originally set to leave the team at the end of 2025 for the incoming Audi project, departed in mid-December 2022 to fill the vacancy at Sauber caused by the sudden exit of chief executive officer Frédéric Vasseur. Seidl was immediately replaced by Andrea Stella, who had been McLaren's executive director of racing.

=== Initial design and development ===
At its launch, the car was considered an evolution of its predecessor, which had itself undergone heavy development during the 2022 season. It retained the unusual front pullrod, rear pushrod suspension layout that was reintroduced with the MCL36. The MCL60 featured tighter sidepod geometry with a more aggressive undercut, partly intended to free up space for ground effect inlet tunnels. The radiator inlet on the engine cover was lengthened, closer to the style of the inlet seen on the 2022 Ferrari F1-75. The floor edge cut-out (Note: The cut-out in the floor assists in directing airflow before it reaches the rear tyres.) was shifted forwards, closer to its positioning on most other teams' cars.

The team stated that they were confident they had addressed the shortcomings of the MCL36, broadly labelled as aerodynamics and tyre management. Despite this, Stella said the team was "[n]ot entirely happy for the launch car" and intended to introduce substantial upgrades beginning in the fourth round of the season, the Azerbaijan Grand Prix. It was later revealed that these upgrades had been in development since September 2022 when McLaren decided to change design course entirely. Norris said that he had advocated for McLaren to change their design philosophy to prioritise driveability rather than ultimate performance. He said that certain undesirable design characteristics were persisting in McLaren cars across his four seasons with the team and through several rule changes, but also said that he did not expect to know if the team had successfully addressed this until the pre-season test.

The MCL60 was Key's last project at McLaren. He departed the team in March 2023 as part of an organisational restructuring, and the position of executive technical director was split into three departments. Peter Prodromou and Neil Houdley took over work as head of aerodynamic and head of engineering and design, respectively.

=== Liveries ===
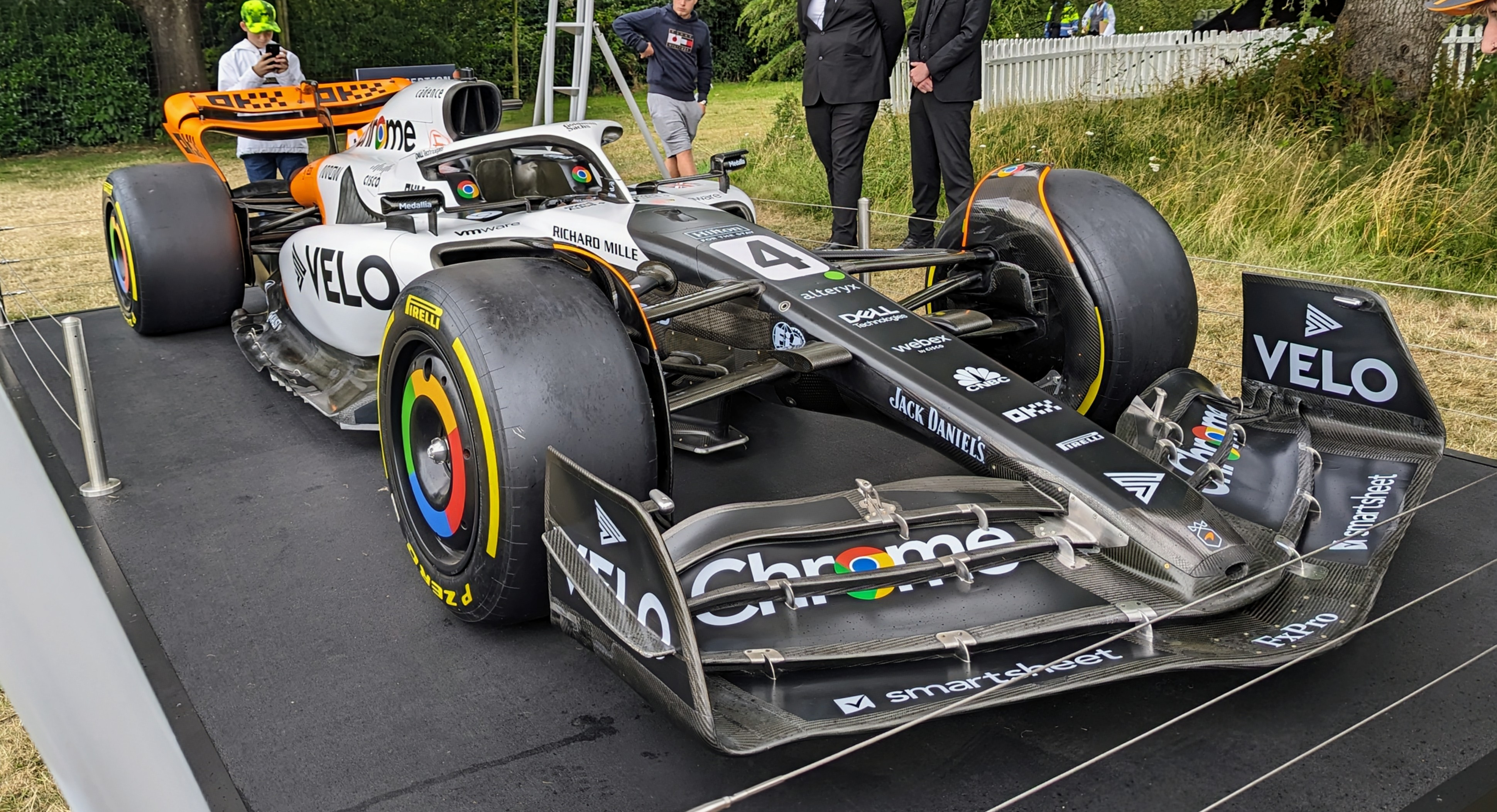

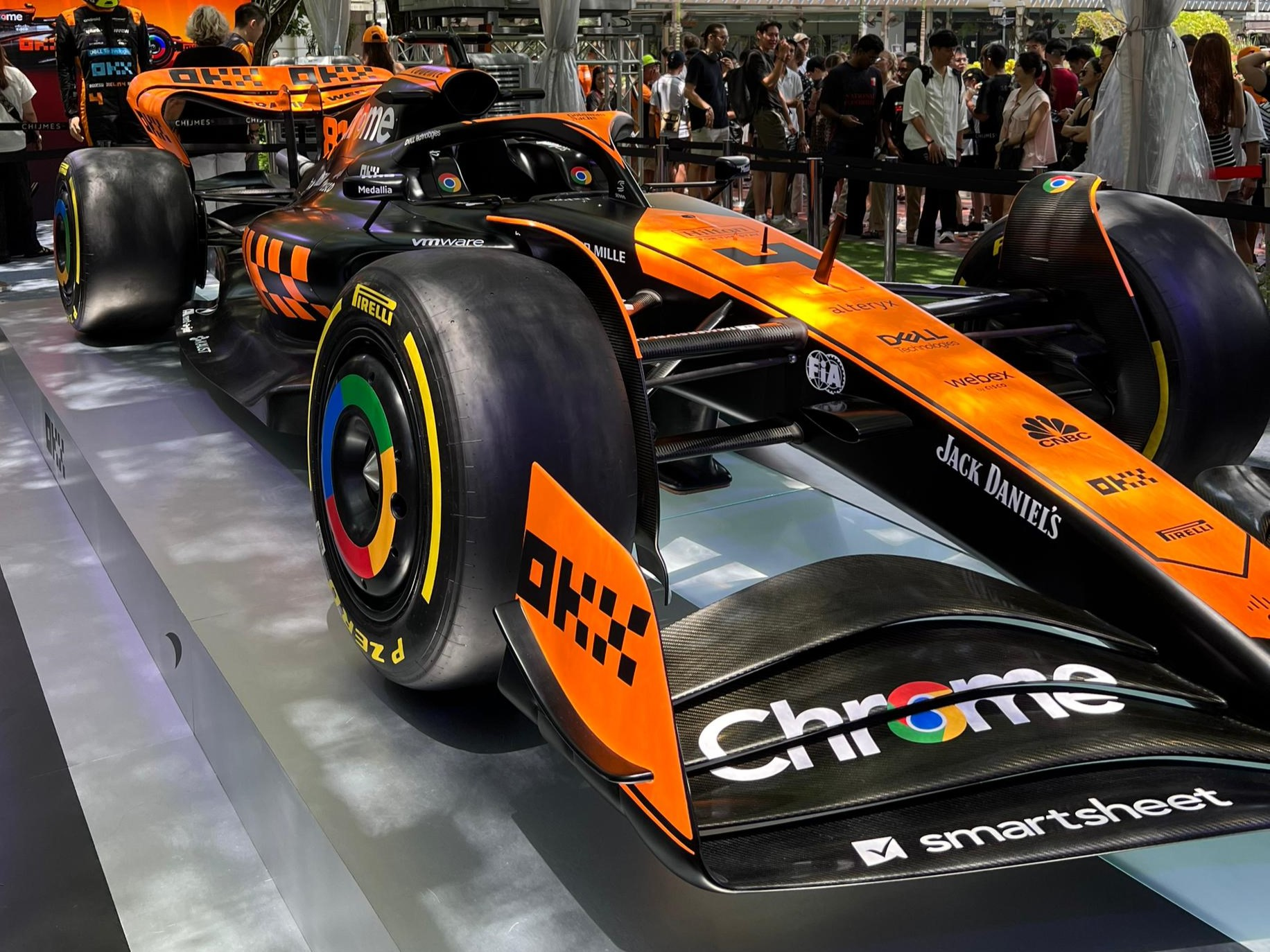
The Triple Crown livery used for the Monaco and Spanish Grands Prix (top) and "Stealth Mode" livery used for the Singapore and Japanese Grands Prix (bottom), both pictured on display cars

The MCL60 livery largely resembled the design débuted on the MCL36, but with additional exposed carbon fibre to save weight. As with all McLaren Formula One cars since the MCL35, the livery was applied with a vinyl wrap rather than paint, which is more lightweight and aerodynamically efficient compared to painted cars, as well as quicker to prepare. The MCL60 featured a new advertising scheme developed by Seamless Digital using e-ink displays, allowing the advertising to be changed at any time. Although the technology debuted on the MCL36 during practice for the 2022 United States Grand Prix, the MCL60 marked its first full-season usage.

For the Monaco and Spanish Grands Prix, the car ran with a special livery celebrating McLaren's achievement of the Triple Crown of Motorsport – McLaren being the only motorsports team to have completed it as of 2023. The car was painted in three segments to commemorate McLaren's first win of each component race. The rear of the car was papaya in reference to the McLaren M16C/D that Johnny Rutherford won the 1974 Indianapolis 500 in, the middle was white in tribute to the McLaren MP4/2 that Alain Prost drove when he won the 1984 Monaco Grand Prix, and the front was black in recognition of the McLaren F1 GTR that JJ Lehto, Yannick Dalmas, and Masanori Sekiya drove to victory in the 1995 24 Hours of Le Mans.

For the British Grand Prix, in conjunction with sponsor Google Chrome, the MCL60 featured a chrome livery, a tribute to the livery used while Vodafone was the team's title sponsor.

The car featured another special livery for the Singapore and Japanese Grands Prix, this time predominantly black with papaya orange highlights. The livery was named "Stealth Mode" by McLaren and was run in conjunction with sponsor OKX.

For the third year running, the MCL60 featured a special livery for the Abu Dhabi Grand Prix, which in collaboration with Vuse featured the artwork of an emerging local artist, in this case Nujood Al-Otaibi.

== Competition and development history ==
=== Pre-season ===
Stella stated that the primary goal for the 2023 season was for the team to re-establish itself as the leading midfield team. The team reiterated during the pre-season test at Bahrain International Circuit that it was not satisfied with the launch specification car, especially its excessive aerodynamic drag. Piastri said the MCL60 experienced the same limitations as the MCL36, which he tested in the official 2022 post-season test.

=== Opening rounds and Azerbaijani upgrades ===
Norris qualified eleventh and Piastri eighteenth for the first race of the season, the Bahrain Grand Prix. Ahead of the race, Stella and Norris both agreed that McLaren could out-develop its rivals during the course of the season, saying that the issues the team faced were fixable. During the race, Piastri had risen to twelfth place before his car suffered an electrical issue. The team attempted to fix the issue by switching steering wheels in the pits, but the fault was located further down the steering column and could not be rectified, meaning Piastri retired on his début. Norris also suffered reliability issues, hampered by a loss of pneumatic pressure from the Mercedes power unit. The issue limited gearbox performance and forced Norris to pit every ten laps or so in order for the pneumatic pressure tank to be topped up. He finished seventeenth and last on track after completing six pit stops, motivated by McLaren's desire to collect additional data on car performance. The result meant the team were classified tenth and last in the World Constructors' Championship (WCC). Despite the reliability issues, Norris stated that he believed the MCL60 was not as far off the pace as some commentators had argued.

The MCL60 featured a new diffuser upgrade and a track-specific rear wing for the Saudi Arabian Grand Prix. Norris was forced to take his second engine of the season after the team determined the unit that failed in the first race could not be reused. Piastri qualified for the race in ninth, and started eighth after another driver received a grid penalty. Norris, meanwhile, clipped a wall and damaged the steering system on his car. The damage could not be repaired by the end of the first stage of qualifying (Q1), leaving him nineteenth on the grid. On the opening lap of the race Piastri and Pierre Gasly collided, causing damage to the front wing of Piastri's car. The debris from the collision struck Norris' car, requiring both to pit for a new front wing. Piastri finished the race fifteenth and Norris finished seventeenth. Piastri left the round classified nineteenth in the World Drivers' Championship (WDC) and Norris in twentieth and last.

At the Australian Grand Prix, McLaren ran a tighter circuit-specific engine cover and introduced new floor fences for the car's diffuser. Norris qualified thirteenth and Piastri sixteenth. Piastri said his struggles were a combination of poor car set-up and inexperience. In a chaotic race interrupted by multiple incidents, Norris finished seventh and Piastri ninth. Both were promoted a place by a penalty for Carlos Sainz Jr. Norris moved up to eighth and Piastri up to thirteenth in the WDC, and the team moved from last to fifth in the WCC.

The first significant upgrade to the MCL60 was made to the car for the Azerbaijan Grand Prix: it featured an entirely new floor and a circuit-specific beam wing (Note: The beam wing is a secondary aerodynamic device located below the rear wing. It complements the rear wing by creating a low-pressure area at the rear of the car. This accelerates the rate of airflow through the venturi tunnels, increasing the downforce generated by the ground effect.) and rear wing. The new floor involved a "radical" redistribution of aerodynamic load across the car's length, with particularly noticeable changes in the area ahead of the rear tyres. The package was the last developed under Key's leadership, and was the first of three upgrades delivered to the car. Norris qualified seventh but was disappointed not to be fourth, and an unwell Piastri qualified tenth. In the sprint shootout, Piastri finished eleventh and Norris tenth. However, the team had made a conscious choice to use all sets of softs allocated for Norris and prioritise starting position for the race, which precluded him from participating in the final session of the sprint shootout. Piastri finished the sprint tenth and Norris seventeenth. In the Grand Prix, both drivers pitted immediately before a safety car, and were subsequently trapped in a DRS train until the closing stages of the race. Norris finished ninth and Piastri finished eleventh. As a result, Norris fell to ninth in the WDC.

Norris qualified sixteenth and Piastri nineteenth for the Miami Grand Prix, the first time both cars had been eliminated in Q1 since the 2018 Brazilian Grand Prix. Nyck de Vries hit Norris from behind on the first lap, leaving the latter with floor damage. Stella estimated that this damage cost Norris between 0.2 and 0.3 seconds per lap worth of downforce. On lap six, Piastri's MCL60 suffered brake-by-wire and energy recovery system faults, issues which affected him throughout the race. Norris finished seventeenth and Piastri nineteenth. Stella stated after the race that the results indicated McLaren needed to focus on developing the car's performance on low-grip surfaces, and in off-brakes, off-throttle periods. The result moved Piastri down to fourteenth in the WDC.

The MCL60 featured a special livery for the Monaco Grand Prix, in recognition of McLaren's completion of the Triple Crown of Motorsport (see § Liveries). The car also featured a revised tunnel inlet to comply with a new technical directive, a revised rear wing endplate, as well as track-specific rear and beam wings. Norris qualified tenth, and Piastri eleventh. Both moved up a place in the race to finish ninth and tenth, respectively. Both cars were the fastest on track when wet conditions arrived in the closing stages. The team lost fifth place to Alpine in the WCC, while in the WDC Norris moved down to eleventh and Piastri up to thirteenth.

The car again featured the Triple Crown livery for the Spanish Grand Prix (see § Liveries), as well as reprofiled front brake ducts. Norris qualified in third place. Piastri qualified tenth, but started ninth after penalties for another driver. Norris was struck by Lewis Hamilton on the first lap, and dropped to last place after pitting for a new front wing. He finished seventeenth, and Piastri thirteenth.

McLaren introduced a new rear wing flap and beam wing at the Canadian Grand Prix. Norris qualified seventh for the race. Piastri qualified ninth after crashing in the final stage of qualifying (Q3), but started eighth after a penalty for another driver. Norris finished ninth but received a five-second penalty for driving slowly under the safety car, dropping him to thirteenth. Piastri finished thirteenth but was promoted to twelfth by Norris' penalty. Piastri fell back to fourteenth in the WDC.

=== Austrian–British upgrades and turnaround in form ===
The new technical leadership, headed by Prodromou and Houldey, developed a significant upgrade package to the car that included changes to almost all aerodynamic surfaces of the car. Originally, both drivers were meant to receive the first part of the package at the British Grand Prix, but McLaren managed to prepare one set of parts early which was fitted to Norris' car. Approximately half the package was delivered to Norris at the Austrian Grand Prix, with the remainder split roughly evenly between the British and Hungarian Grands Prix. Piastri's car was expected to receive both the Austrian and British packages at the British Grand Prix, bringing both cars back to the same specification. However, only Norris received the British upgrades, while Piastri received the Austrian package. The final stage of the package, intended to be introduced in Hungary, was delayed.

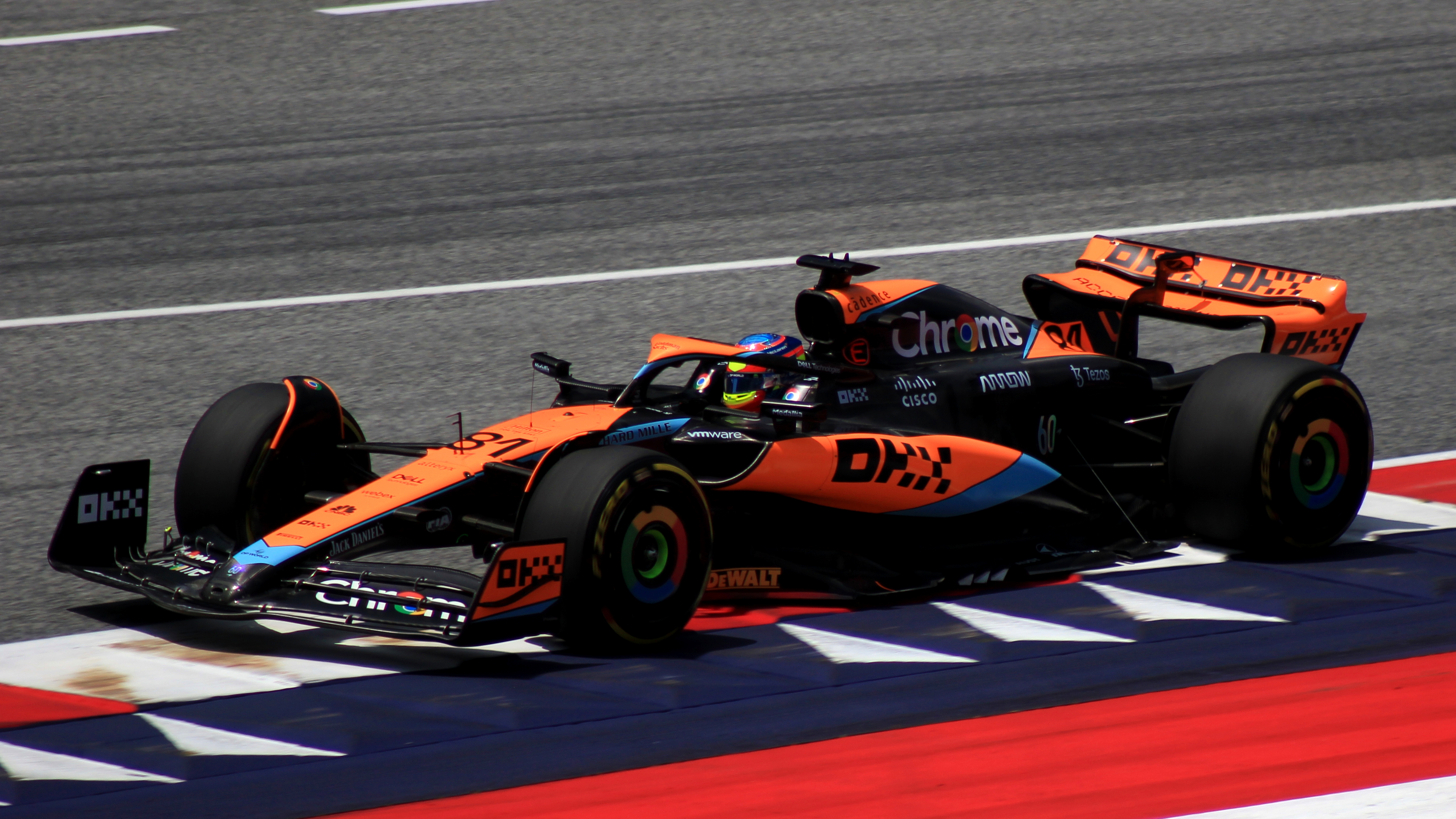
Piastri during the Austrian Grand Prix

Norris' car featured extensive changes to the sidepods, bodywork, and floor for the Austrian Grand Prix. Specifically, the sidepod inlet and the underlying cooling elements, rearview mirrors, halo, floor edge and fences, diffuser, engine cover, and cooling louvres were all updated. In the sprint shootout, Norris qualified third and Piastri qualified seventeenth. During the sprint, Norris suffered an anti-stall system error and ultimately finished ninth, while Piastri moved up to finish eleventh. Norris qualified fourth and Piastri qualified thirteenth, missing Q3 due to a penalty for track limits. Norris finished fifth and was promoted to fourth after penalties were applied to other drivers. Piastri, who continued to run the old specification, had a collision with Kevin Magnussen during the race and was forced to pit for a new front wing. He finished seventeenth and was promoted to sixteenth following the penalties.

Further upgrades were introduced for the British Grand Prix, with Piastri's car brought to the Austrian specification. Norris received new rear suspension and rear brake duct geometry, as well as a new front wing and nose cone. The new front wing employed a different method of attaching the wing elements to the endplates, creating a larger space for airflow and more powerful outwash. Aside from performance developments, the MCL60 also featured a one-off chrome livery (see § Liveries). Norris qualified for the race second and Piastri in third. In the race, Norris overtook polesitter Max Verstappen at the race start and lead the first four laps before Verstappen retook the lead. He finished the race second. Piastri was denied a podium of his own by an untimely safety car and finished the race fourth. The result meant McLaren scored more points in the British Grand Prix than all the preceding races in the season combined, allowing them to take back fifth place in the WCC from Alpine. Norris improved to ninth and Piastri to eleventh in the WDC.

Following the British Grand Prix, Piastri remained at the Silverstone Circuit to drive the MCL60 in wet weather tests for the FIA. The MCL60 was run unmodified to provide a reference against the Mercedes-AMG F1 W14 E Performance, which was fitted with experimental spray guards.

=== Remaining European rounds ===
Piastri's car received the British specification upgrades, bringing both cars back to the same specification for the Hungarian Grand Prix as the final stage of upgrades was delayed. Norris qualified third and Piastri qualified fourth. Although Norris moved up to finish second, Piastri suffered floor damage and reduced rear downforce and finished fifth. Norris moved up to eighth in the WDC.

McLaren ran a circuit-specific rear wing and beam wing for the Belgian Grand Prix. Piastri qualified sixth for the race and Norris, who "completely destroyed" the floor of the car in an error in Q1, qualified seventh. Piastri was promoted a place on the grid due to a penalty for another driver. Piastri qualified second for the sprint, and led several laps in the rain-shortened race. He finished second in the sprint. Norris qualified fifth for the sprint and finished seventh, but was promoted to sixth after penalties for another driver. In the race, Piastri was involved in a first-lap incident with Carlos Sainz Jr. and retired with suspension damage. McLaren, who were expecting wet conditions, found that they had loaded the car with too much downforce for a dry race, and Norris was running as low as seventeenth before recovering ten positions to finish in seventh.

The car remained at the Circuit de Spa-Francorchamps after the Belgian Grand Prix to take part in a two-day test for Formula One's sole tyre supplier, Pirelli. Despite the rain, Piastri completed 47 laps on the first day of testing, and Norris completed 40 on the second day.

For the Dutch Grand Prix, McLaren ran a circuit-specific beam wing and rear wing designed for Circuit Zandvoort's drag range. For the race, Norris qualified second and Piastri qualified eighth. Unpredictable wet conditions and poor strategy contributed to Norris finishing seventh and Piastri ninth, with McLaren starting a review of strategic communication within the team as a result. Piastri fell to twelfth in the WDC.

The team introduced a range of new circuit-specific parts at the Italian Grand Prix, in an effort to avoid the issue encountered in Belgium caused by a lack of a low-drag aerodynamics kit. These included new front and rear wings, front brake duct, and rear corner winglet assemblies. Piastri qualified seventh and Norris ninth. During the race, Piastri was struck by Hamilton while in eighth place, for which Hamilton was given a five-second penalty. Piastri was later given a five-second penalty of his own for a track limits violation, but it did not affect his final place. Norris finished the race eighth, and Piastri achieved the fastest lap of the race but finished twelfth.

=== Singapore upgrades and closing rounds ===
McLaren introduced an extensive upgrade package for the Singapore Grand Prix. The package included changes to sidepod design which introduced a deep channel in the bodywork as well as a new sidepod air inlet, and a new engine cover to better direct airflow to a redesigned floor. The floor featured new fence arrangements which was more inwardly angled, a new floor edge, and a new diffuser. Both the front and rear wing endplates were changed, the former to produce more outwash. The rear brake ducts and toelink fairing were also redesigned and a new halo design was introduced. Norris received the entire package, while Piastri received only part of it. Both cars featured a circuit-specific rear wing. The changes were intended to improve McLaren's performance in slow speed corners. The car also featured a special livery alongside the upgrades (see § Liveries). Piastri's final Q1 run was interrupted by red flags after a serious crash by Lance Stroll, meaning he qualified seventeenth for the race. Norris, however, qualified fourth. In the race, Piastri recovered to finish seventh, while Norris improved to finish second. Piastri moved back up to eleventh in the WDC.

Piastri received the remainder of the upgrade package fitted to Norris' car in Singapore at the Japanese Grand Prix, and the MCL60 again featured the special livery (see § Liveries). McLaren also introduced a new sidepod inlet and a circuit-specific beam wing. Piastri qualified second and Norris qualified third, although they finished the opposite way around, marking Piastri's first podium in Formula One. Norris moved up to seventh in the WDC and Piastri improved to ninth.

After both having lap times deleted in qualifying for the Qatar Grand Prix, Piastri qualified sixth and Norris tenth, with the latter not setting a valid lap time in Q3. In the sprint shootout, Piastri qualified on pole and Norris second. Piastri won the sprint and Norris finished third. In the Grand Prix, Piastri and Norris moved up to second and third respectively.

At the United States Grand Prix, Norris qualified second and Piastri tenth for the race. In the sprint shootout, Norris qualified and finished fourth, while Piastri qualified fifth but finished tenth after struggling with tyre degradation. Piastri was involved in a collision with Esteban Ocon, and retired from the race with a water leak and damage to his MCL60's radiator. Norris, however, finished the race third, but was promoted to second after another driver was disqualified. The weekend's results moved McLaren ahead of Aston Martin for fourth place in the WCC. In the WDC, Norris moved up to sixth.

The Mexico City Grand Prix's high elevation and thus thinner atmosphere led McLaren to fit a circuit-specific engine cover and larger front brake ducts to the MCL60 to maintain efficient cooling. Piastri qualified seventh, but Norris failed to set a representative lap time in Q1 and qualified nineteenth, although he started seventeenth after grid penalties for other drivers. In the race, Norris improved to finish fifth, and Piastri finished eighth after picking up damage in a collision.

Qualifying for the São Paulo Grand Prix was impacted by poor weather during Q3, leaving neither driver with a representative lap time. Norris qualified seventh and Piastri tenth, although the former started the race sixth after a grid penalty for another driver. In the sprint shootout, Norris qualified on pole and Piastri qualified tenth, and they finished second and tenth respectively. During the race start, Norris moved up to second, which he maintained until the end of the race. However, an incident further down the led to Piastri being struck by another car, damaging his MCL60's floor, rear wing, and rear brake duct winglets. Although the floor and rear wing were repaired under the red flag, Piastri carried the winglet damage for the rest of the race, and he finished fourteenth. Norris moved up to fifth in the WDC.

McLaren fitted a circuit-specific beam wing and rear wing to the car for the inaugural Las Vegas Grand Prix. This new beam wing was similar to the design used by Red Bull for their RB19, in that it featured a single beam wing instead of McLaren's previous design, which included two. The rear wing was modified to complement this change, with intention of improving aerodynamic efficiency and therefore top speed. Norris qualified sixteenth and Piastri nineteenth, which Stella said was due to poor tyre strategy rather than a lack of car performance. Both drivers moved up a place on the starting grid due to a penalty for another driver. Norris did not finish the race, having bottomed out on an uneven part of the track and collided heavily with a barrier. Piastri was struck by Hamilton, but finished tenth and set the fastest lap of the race and thus the lap record for the Las Vegas Strip Circuit – a record which only stood until Norris broke it the following year in the MCL38.

The MCL60 featured another special livery for the Abu Dhabi Grand Prix (see § Liveries). McLaren IndyCar driver Pato O'Ward participated in the first free practice session in place of Norris, fulfilling McLaren's obligation to run a rookie driver. (Note: Every team is required to run a young driver (defined as a driver with no more than two race starts) twice during the season, once for each car. As Piastri had no race starts at the beginning of the season, his participation in the first free practice session at the Bahrain Grand Prix fulfilled one of these two mandatory sessions.) Piastri qualified third and Norris fifth. Norris finished fifth in the race, while Piastri finished sixth, meaning they secured sixth and ninth in the WDC respectively. McLaren finished the season fourth in the WCC.

O'Ward also drove for the team in the Abu Dhabi post-season test. He was joined by Piastri, who tested Pirelli's 2024 tyre compounds. Piastri's run plan focused mainly on longer stints and he completed 123 laps of Yas Marina Circuit, while O'Ward's included both long and performance runs, and he completed 103 laps.

== Assessment and characteristics ==
=== Original specification and early upgrades ===
Scott Mitchell-Malm of The Race declared that the start of the 2023 season was "borderline disastrous" for the team. McLaren believed itself to be more badly affected by 2023 regulation changes than other teams, specifically raising the rear floor edge and diffuser. The team had developed the profile of their Venturi tunnels around floor edge cut-outs and vortex generators further to the rear than most other teams, a design that lost much of its efficacy when the rear of the floor was raised.

Stella stated that the car lacked downforce but had an excess of drag, largely what the team expected from the compromised launch version. He also identified that the MCL60 was particularly weak on low-grip surfaces when more time is spent off-throttle and off-brake.

Journalist Mark Hughes recognised that the MCL60 "generates heat in its front tyres very effectively, possibly better than any other car", which explained its very competitive performance in the wet closing stages of the Monaco Grand Prix and in the cool conditions in qualifying for the Spanish Grand Prix. Hughes also singled out the car's strength in high-speed corners. In a retrospective piece, Hughes said that it was "to McLaren's credit [...] it saw which way the technical winds were blowing before the season had even begun", unlike the team's immediate competitors Ferrari and Mercedes who quickly hit the limits of their car concepts, and Aston Martin who lost pace pursuing an uncompetitive concept.

Mat Coch of Speedcafe argued that the original specification MCL60 was "not fundamentally bad", but that it had "some unique idiosyncrasies that limit[ed] its performance". He also noted its quick tyre heating, suggesting that the MCL60's strong pace in cool conditions was due to its ability to maintain tyre temperature even as environmental temperatures dropped. Likewise, quick tyre heating leads to strong qualifying performances. However, Coch noted that this trait also meant the car produced excessive tyre degradation in typical race conditions. He acknowledged its stability on straights and in high-speed corners but noted that its poor off-throttle performance was due to excessive lateral roll.

=== Mid-season Austrian–British upgrades ===
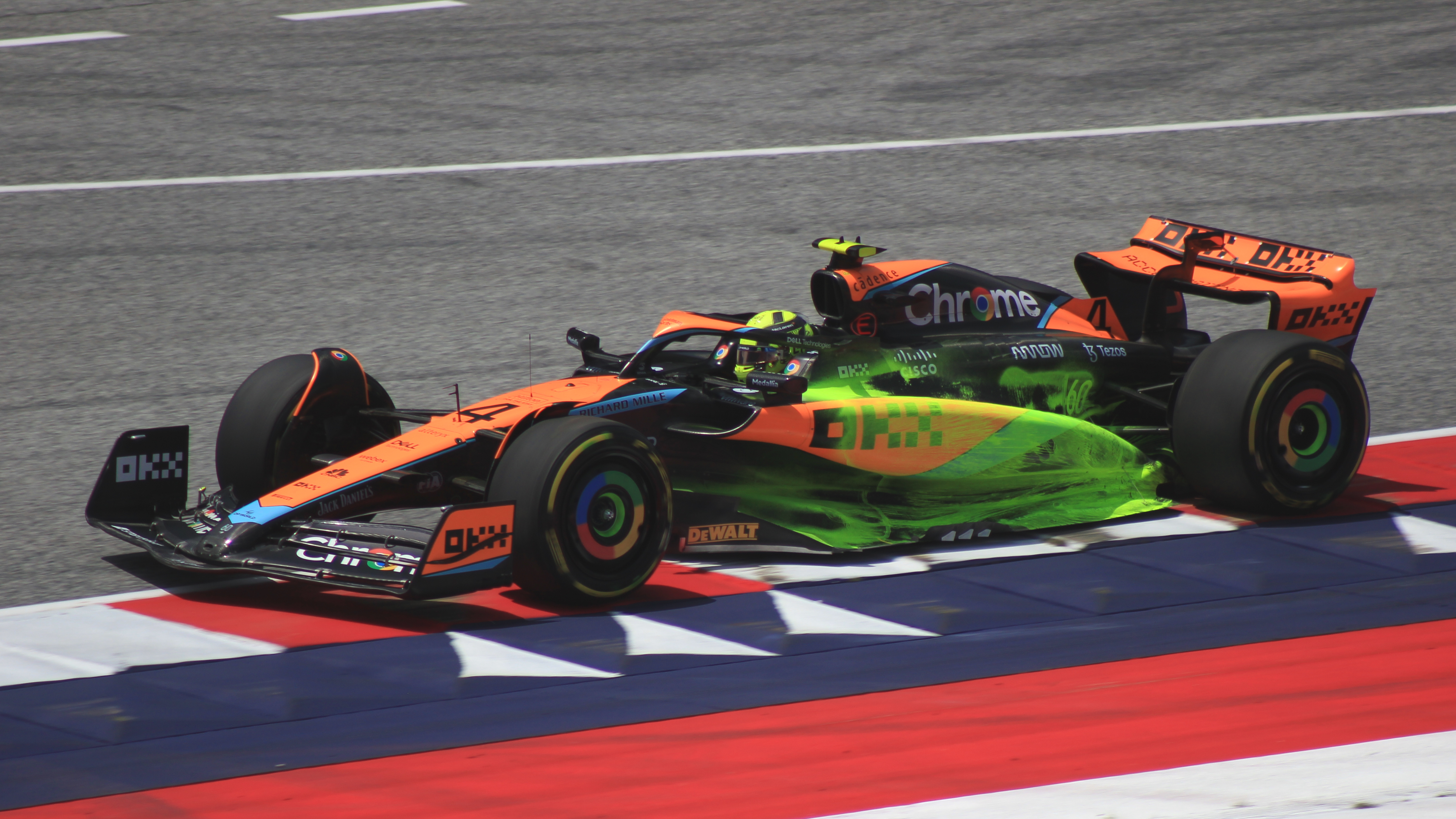
Norris during practice for the Austrian Grand Prix. The sidepods of his MCL60 are coated in flow visualisation paint, used to visualise and evaluate the aerodynamic performance of new parts.

Some commentators and outlets have referred to the post-British Grand Prix specification car as the MCL60B, and Stella likened the package to a B-specification. However, the upgrades never modified the chassis of the car (as typically required for a B-specification), and no version of the MCL60 was ever officially named the MCL60B.

The team's mid-season upgrades were assessed as "one of the all-time great" turnarounds by Lawrence Barreto, "one of the most impressive in-season development steps ever seen in F1" by Andrew Benson, and a "miracle leap" by Hughes. Likewise, Hughes and technical analyst Giorgio Piola said it was clear the MCL60 was "the most improved car" over the first half of 2023 season, and called the package the "best upgrade" of the first half of the season. They later observed that the upgrades introduced in the Azerbaijani race were a change in design philosophy, and the upgrades introduced in Austria and Britain were based on that shift. The essential feature of this shift was the emphasis on creating more airflow in the forward area of the underfloor, which in turn improves the quality of the airflow into the diffuser. Barretto suggested that beyond the improvement in performance, the upgrades had opened up ample development paths for McLaren to pursue further performance gains, either on the MCL60 or its eventual successor. Tony Dodgins of Motor Sport called the upgrade a "quantum leap", and said that the prospect of McLaren being the second fastest team on merit "could not have been entertained" at the first race in Bahrain.

Despite the changes and improvement in performance, Norris did not believe the car was fundamentally easier to drive. Although the package presented a substantial increase in the car's peak downforce, it continued to lack off-throttle performance through the mid-corner. Compared to the WDC- and WCC-winning Red Bull Racing RB19, the MCL60 had a significant straight-line speed deficit and continued to lack performance in long corners.

After the Singapore Grand Prix, Hughes and Piola noted that McLaren's Austrian–British upgrades appeared to have inspired similar changes by Alfa Romeo to their C43, Alpine to their A523, and AlphaTauri to their AT04.

=== Singaporean upgrades ===
Stella stated that despite the team's improvement in results, the team had not achieved even half of its aerodynamic goals, and the work would have to be continued on the MCL60's successor, the MCL38. Norris said that the upgrades had worked as expected and produced a quicker car, but noted that at its limits the MCL60 still experienced the same core weaknesses as its predecessors. Piastri said that the upgrades had been "able to deliver everything we hoped, in some cases more than we expected". Auto Motor und Sport's Michael Schmidt observed that the car was now competitive with Red Bull in fast and medium speed corners and in tyre management following the Singaporean upgrades, but still lacking in slow speed turns. Stella explained that the team had focused on four areas: introducing an outwash-focused front wing, wider sidepods with an aggressive undercut, the reintroduction of a floor edge wing, and a low-drag beam wing. Writing for The Race, Gary Anderson said that "[f]or a team that started the season seemingly lost, McLaren has recovered like no other".

Following the São Paulo Grand Prix at which Norris was a serious threat to Verstappen throughout the weekend, it appeared that the biggest difference in performance between the MCL60 and the RB19 was the Red Bulls' superior tyre preservation: although the MCL60 could match and even outperform the RB19 over a single qualifying lap or early in a stint on new tyres, it could not preserve its tyres for as long as the Red Bull, and lost time later in each stint. Andreas Haupt of Auto Motor und Sport said that the car had developed "all-rounder qualities" and no longer substantially varied in performance across different circuits. Haupt acknowledged that the MCL60 still did not excel in slow-speed corners, but had improved significantly. After the season finale at the Abu Dhabi Grand Prix, Stella speculated that while the upgrades had improved pace, they may have worsened the car's handling, and said McLaren would investigate the possible consequences for the MCL38.

== Later use ==
The MCL60 was used for a testing session for sole Formula One tyre supplier Pirelli in January 2025 on the 2A format of Circuit Paul Ricard. Piastri completed 120 laps and Norris 123, testing prototype intermediate and wet tyres for use in the 2026 season. The car – a "mule" modified to simulate a 2026 car – was used again in February for a two-day test at Circuit de Barcelona-Catalunya to test prototype slick tyres for 2026. Norris completed 139 laps and Piastri 152. Later the same month, O'Ward drove the mule car at Circuito de Jerez for another Pirelli test, completing 153 laps. Valtteri Bottas tested the car at Circuit de Barcelona-Catalunya in March. Bottas, a Mercedes reserve driver, doubled as McLaren's reserve for 2025 due to O'Ward's commitments in IndyCar. In June, McLaren's simulator driver and Maserati Formula E driver Jake Hughes tested the car at Circuit de Barcelona-Catalunya. That same month, American actor and star of the F1 film Brad Pitt drove the car at the Circuit of the Americas, alongside Norris, Piastri, McLaren Development Driver and Formula 2 driver Alex Dunne, and commentator Martin Brundle. The car was also displayed at the 2025 Goodwood Festival of Speed in the MCL39's chrome livery. In August, the car was again used as the base for a 2026 mule to test Pirelli tyre prototypes, and Norris completed 144 laps of the Hungaroring.

In March 2026, Leonardo Fornaroli, McLaren's reserve driver for 2026 completed his maiden test in a Formula One car at the Circuit de Barcelona-Catalunya, driving the McLaren MCL60. He made further appearances with the MCL60 in the next two months at Silverstone and in the Circuit of the Americas. In June, Fornaroli and Will Stevens drove the MCL60 at Monza. Norris drove the car for show runs ahead of the Miami Grand Prix. Norris also drove the MCL60 up the hill climb at the 2026 Goodwood Festival of Speed in the MCL40 livery. Norris, Piastri, and Fornaroli tested the car at Algarve International Circuit in July, completing 49, 55, and 47 laps respectively.

== Complete Formula One results ==
Key

Key
| Colour | Result |
|---|---|
| Gold | Winner |
| Silver | Second place |
| Bronze | Third place |
| Green | Other points position |
| Blue | Other classified position |
| Blue | Not classified, finished (NC) |
| Purple | Not classified, retired (Ret) |
| Red | Did not qualify (DNQ) |
| Black | Disqualified (DSQ) |
| White | Did not start (DNS) |
| White | Race cancelled (C) |
| Blank | Did not practice (DNP) |
| Blank | Excluded (EX) |
| Blank | Did not arrive (DNA) |
| Blank | Withdrawn (WD) |
| Blank | Did not enter (empty cell) |
| Annotation | Meaning |
| P | Pole position |
| F | Fastest lap |
| Superscript number | Points-scoring position in sprint |

| Year | Entrant | Power unit | Tyres | Drivers | Grands Prix | | | | | | | | | | | | | | | | | | | | | | Points | WCC |
| Year | Entrant | Power unit | Tyres | Drivers | BHR | SAU | AUS | AZE | MIA | MON | ESP | CAN | AUT | GBR | HUN | BEL | NED | ITA | SIN | JPN | QAT | USA | MXC | SAP | LVG | ABU | Points | WCC |
|---|---|---|---|---|---|---|---|---|---|---|---|---|---|---|---|---|---|---|---|---|---|---|---|---|---|---|---|---|
| 2023 | McLaren F1 Team | Mercedes-AMG; F1 M14 E Performance; 1.6 V6 t | P | (United Kingdom) Lando Norris | 17 | 17 | 6 | 9 | 17 | 9 | 17 | 13 | 4 | 2 | 2 | 7^{6} | 7 | 8 | 2 | 2 | 3^{3} | 2^{4} | 5 | 2^{2 F} | Ret | 5 | 302 | 4th |
| 2023 | McLaren F1 Team | Mercedes-AMG; F1 M14 E Performance; 1.6 V6 t | P | (Australia) Oscar Piastri | Ret | 15 | 8 | 11 | 19 | 10 | 13 | 11 | 16 | 4 | 5 | Ret^{2} | 9 | 12^{F} | 7 | 3 | 2^{1} | Ret | 8 | 14 | 10^{F} | 6 | 302 | 4th |
