= McLaren MCL39 =

2025 Formula One car

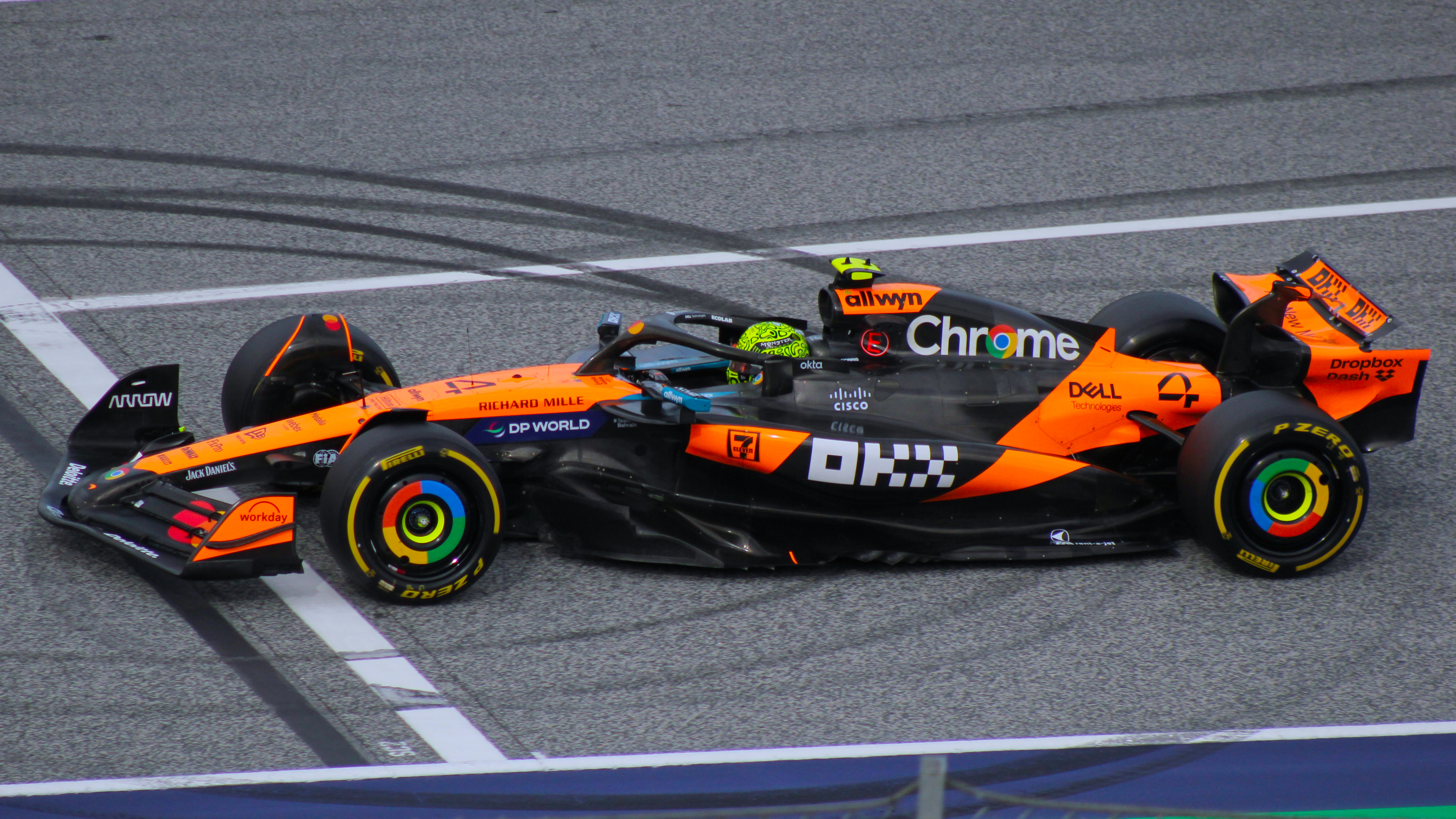
- The MCL39 driven by Lando Norris during the Austrian Grand Prix
- Category: Formula One
- Constructor: McLaren
- Designer: Rob Marshall (Chief Designer)
- Predecessor: McLaren MCL38
- Successor: McLaren MCL40

Technical specifications
- Chassis: Carbon fibre composite
- Suspension (front): Carbon fibre and titanium pullrod suspension legs operating inboard torsion bar and damper system
- Suspension (rear): Carbon fibre and titanium pushrod suspension legs operating inboard torsion bar and damper system
- Engine: Mercedes-AMG F1 M16 E Performance 1.6 L (98 cu in) direct injection V6 turbocharged engine limited to 15,000 RPM in a mid-mounted, rear-wheel drive layout
- Electric motor: Mercedes-AMG Kinetic and thermal energy recovery systems
- Transmission: McLaren 8-speed + 1 reverse sequential seamless semi-automatic transmission operated via paddle shifters
- Battery: Lithium-ion battery
- Weight: 800 kg (including driver, excluding fuel)
- Brakes: 6 piston calipers, carbon ventilated discs/pads
- Tyres: Pirelli P Zero (dry); Pirelli Cinturato (wet)
- Clutch: Electro-hydraulically operated, carbon multi-plate

Competition history
- Notable entrants: McLaren F1 Team
- Notable drivers: 4. (United Kingdom) Lando Norris; 81. (Australia) Oscar Piastri
- Debut: 2025 Australian Grand Prix
- First win: 2025 Australian Grand Prix
- Last win: 2025 São Paulo Grand Prix
- Last event: 2025 Abu Dhabi Grand Prix
Races	Wins	Podiums	Poles	F/Laps
24	14	34	13	12
- Constructors' Championships: 1 (2025)
- Drivers' Championships: 1 (2025)

The McLaren MCL39 is a Formula One car constructed by McLaren and designed under the direction of Rob Marshall to compete in the 2025 Formula One World Championship. It was driven by Lando Norris and Oscar Piastri in their seventh and third seasons with the team respectively. It successfully defended the World Constructors' Championship title and won the World Drivers' Championship with Norris as he became the first McLaren champion since Lewis Hamilton in 2008.

Favoured by commentators in the pre-season to defend McLaren's title, the MCL39 was consistently the fastest car in the field and successfully defended the WCC, securing it at the 2025 Singapore Grand Prix. Norris secured the WDC at the 2025 Abu Dhabi Grand Prix. The MCL39 was the first McLaren since the Adrian Newey-designed MP4/13 of 1998 to win both titles in the same season.

The MCL39 won fourteen Grands Prix in 2025, each driver winning seven apiece. The car scored thirteen pole positions, set twelve fastest laps, and finished on the podium a record total of thirty-four times. The car, in the hands of Norris, also set the Formula One record for fastest race lap by average speed at the Italian Grand Prix.

== Background ==
=== Development context ===
The MCL39 follows the MCL38, McLaren's first championship-winning Formula One car since 1998. Having won the Constructors' Championship in 2024, McLaren was allowed only 70% of the baseline allocation of wind tunnel testing time. Team principal Andrea Stella said he believed McLaren could overcome this disadvantage by improving efficiency elsewhere in the aerodynamic design process.

McLaren's success in developing a front wing that could flex significantly under aerodynamic load during the 2024 season was considered instrumental in overcoming Red Bull's dominance in the ground effect era. New restrictions to combat this use of wing flexibility were introduced, effective from the ninth race of the season (the Spanish Grand Prix). Stella said the team had planned for a "small adjustment" that would be implemented with the new restrictions, but denied they would negatively impact the team.

=== Initial design and development ===
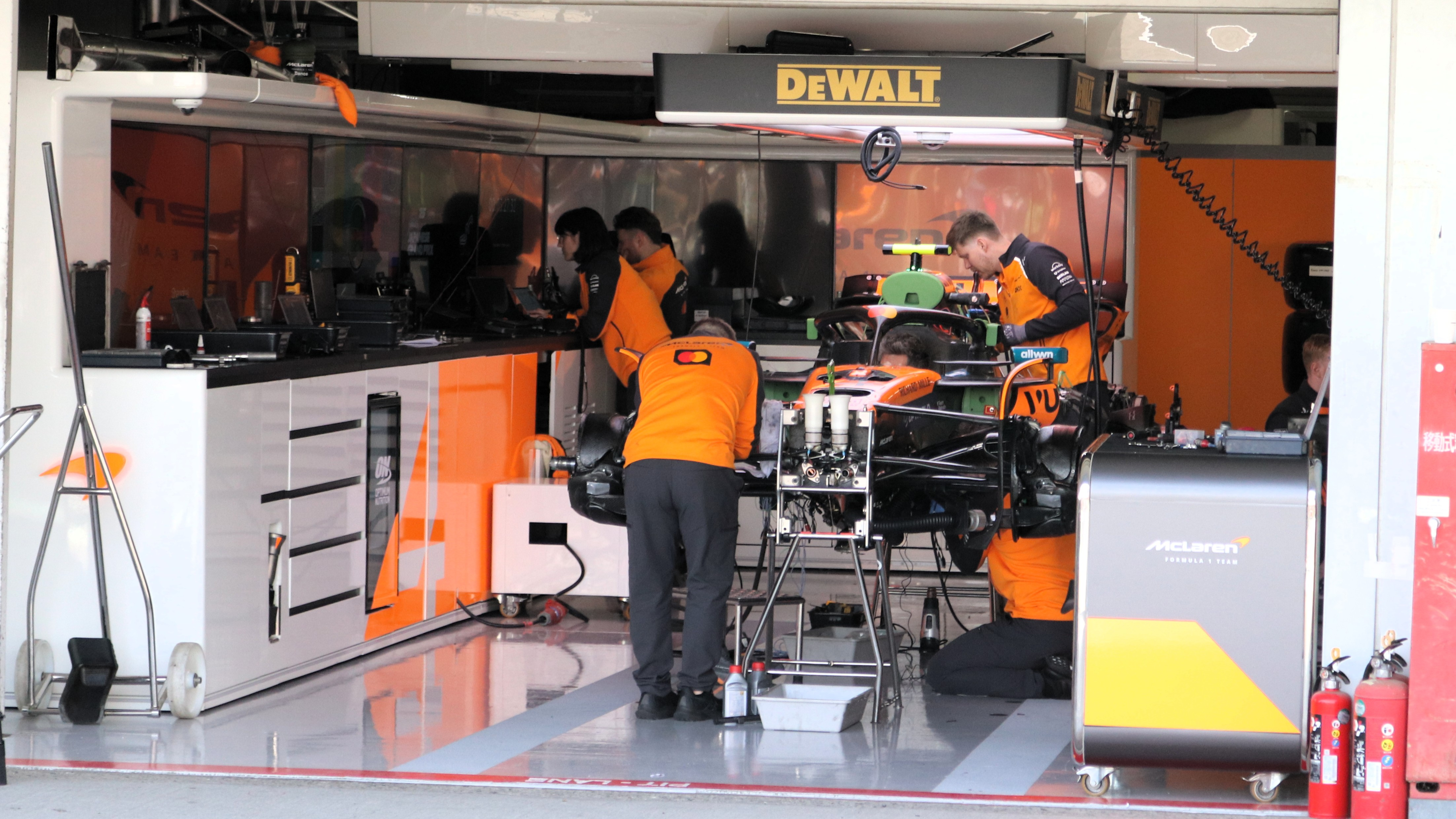
The MCL39 (pictured being built up ahead of the Japanese Grand Prix) made several improvements on the championship-winning MCL38.

McLaren Racing CEO Zak Brown said the team would take a "brave risk" approach to designing the MCL39. Engineering director Neil Houldey said McLaren would not compromise any of its 2025 development despite an entirely new set of technical regulations and engine formula being introduced in 2026. Stella said the team believed it had "maintained the rate of development" it had shown in 2023 and 2024 and that the MCL39's development followed the same "linear trend" as the MCL60 and MCL38.

The MCL39 was the first McLaren car that lead designer Rob Marshall oversaw from its beginning. The car was a significant technical development over the MCL38, exhibiting substantial layout changes. The MCL39 appeared to have shifted its radiators further up and backward compared to the MCL38. It retained the front pullrod and rear pushrod suspension layout, but with increased anti-dive measures to better control the car's ride height. Other visible changes included new sidepod inlet shapes, revised engine cover bodywork, and a new, wider airbox inlet shape.

Stella said the team would deliver several early-season updates, consistent with McLaren's development plan in recent seasons. After the United States Grand Prix, Stella announced that the team would no longer bring upgrades to the car.

=== Liveries ===
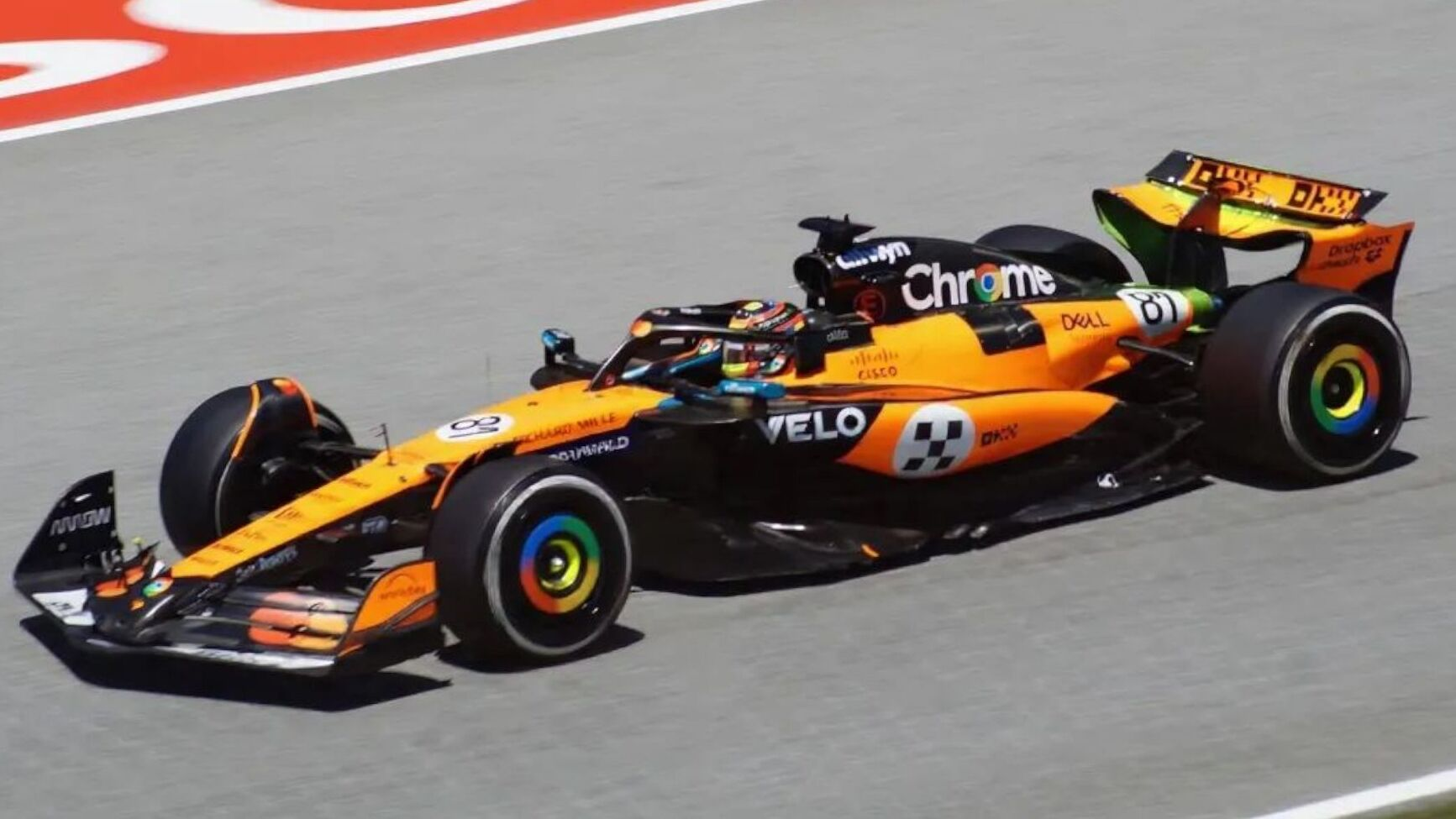
Piastri driving his MCL39 with M7A inspired livery during practice for the Spanish Grand Prix

The MCL39 used a one-off papaya orange and black geometric dazzle camouflage pattern for its pre-season filming day, as all teams had committed to launching their season liveries at a dedicated event.

The car's season livery was substantially identical to that of the MCL38. McLaren issued a statement explaining that the team had never changed its livery the season after a championship win and never substantially changed a livery during a period of sustained success.

A special livery inspired by the McLaren M7A – the car that first featured McLaren's papaya livery – was used for the Monaco and Spanish Grands Prix. For the British Grand Prix, McLaren once again used a chrome livery inspired by those used from 2006–2014, following on from positive fan reception of those used in 2023 and 2024, but with more chrome than in those years. For the United States and Mexico City Grands Prix, McLaren raced a special livery based on Google Gemini's colour palette. Finally, for the Abu Dhabi Grand Prix the car was run in a livery designed by a select group of fans that featured artwork commemorating significant moments in the team's history.

== Competition and development history ==
=== Pre-season ===
McLaren were considered favourites to win a second consecutive World Constructors' Championship in 2025. Norris was the favourite to win the World Drivers' Championship, although Piastri also said he was a serious contender for the title. The MCL39 was first run on track in a private filming day at Silverstone in February 2025, driven by both Norris and Piastri. Stella stated that this version of the car was substantially the same as that which would be run in the official pre-season test.

During the test, Norris said the car handled similarly to its predecessor; he also said the rear end of the car was less stable than the team wanted. Other teams widely considered the MCL39 to have a performance advantage over the rest of the field.

=== Opening rounds ===
Norris qualified on pole and Piastri second for the season-opening Australian Grand Prix. The race was held in mixed conditions, and was interrupted by several safety car periods. Piastri lost second place to Max Verstappen of Red Bull Racing on the opening lap but regained the position later on and ran second behind Norris. Shortly after switching to slick tyres as the track dried, both drivers went off at the same corner when rain returned. Although Norris managed to continue and pit to return to intermediate tyres, Piastri was stranded on a grass run-off. Piastri rejoined the race a lap down after slowly reversing off the grass. Norris won the race and set the fastest lap, and Piastri recovered to finish ninth. The result placed McLaren first in the World Constructors' Championship (WCC), and the drivers first and ninth in the World Drivers' Championship (WDC).

The Chinese Grand Prix was the first round of the season to use the sprint format. Piastri qualified for the sprint second, and Norris, who made an error in his final lap, qualified sixth. Piastri finished the sprint second. Norris made another error at the start, losing positions and finishing eighth. Piastri qualified on pole for the Grand Prix for the first time in his career and Norris qualified third. Piastri won the race and Norris – whose brakes began to fail in the closing laps of the race – finished second, moving Piastri up to fourth and allowing Norris to retain his lead in the WDC. Media and other teams speculated throughout the weekend on the prospect of McLaren being negatively affected by stricter rear wing regulations introduced ahead of the round, which did not eventuate.

Norris qualified second and Piastri third for the Japanese Grand Prix, and they finished the race in those positions. Piastri improved to third in the WDC.

McLaren introduced a new front brake duct winglet at the Bahrain Grand Prix. Piastri qualified on pole and Norris sixth. Norris overshot his grid-box at the race start and received a five second time penalty. Piastri won the race, moving him to second, and Norris made up places during the race to finish in third place. Piastri improved to second in the WDC.

Piastri qualified second for the Saudi Arabian Grand Prix, but Norris crashed during the final stage of qualifying, leaving him tenth. Piastri won the race, and Norris recovered to finish fourth. Piastri took the lead of the WDC from Norris.

=== North American and early European rounds ===
Piastri and Norris qualified second and third, respectively, for the Miami Grand Prix sprint event. Norris won the sprint ahead of teammate Piastri after a well-timed safety car allowed him to jump his teammate. Norris qualified second for the main race, while Piastri qualified fourth; Piastri made up three places to win the race ahead of Norris.

Piastri qualified on pole at the Emilia Romagna Grand Prix, and Norris qualified fourth. Piastri lost position to Verstappen on the opening lap, and Norris improved to second. Piastri finished third.

McLaren ran the MCL39 in a special livery at the Monaco Grand Prix (see § Liveries). Norris qualified on pole and Piastri third, and they finished the race in those positions.

Stricter front wing tests were introduced at the Spanish Grand Prix; McLaren had previously tested its revised design in practice at the Emilia Romagna Grand Prix and concluded the MCL39 would not be affected. The car was again run in its special livery (see § Liveries). Piastri qualified on pole and Norris second, the same positions they finished the race in. Piastri set the fastest lap of the race.

Two upgrades were introduced at the Canadian Grand Prix to both the chassis and suspension fairing junctions, likely due to the stricter testing from Spain onwards, which only Norris ran. Piastri qualified third and Norris seventh; Norris attributed the result to over-driving resulting in errors. Piastri finished fourth while Norris crashed late in the race while attempting to overtake Piastri. As he had completed over 90% of the scheduled race distance, Norris was classified eighteenth. Norris said he was at fault for the incident, and Stella said that "he paid a price" in the WDC.

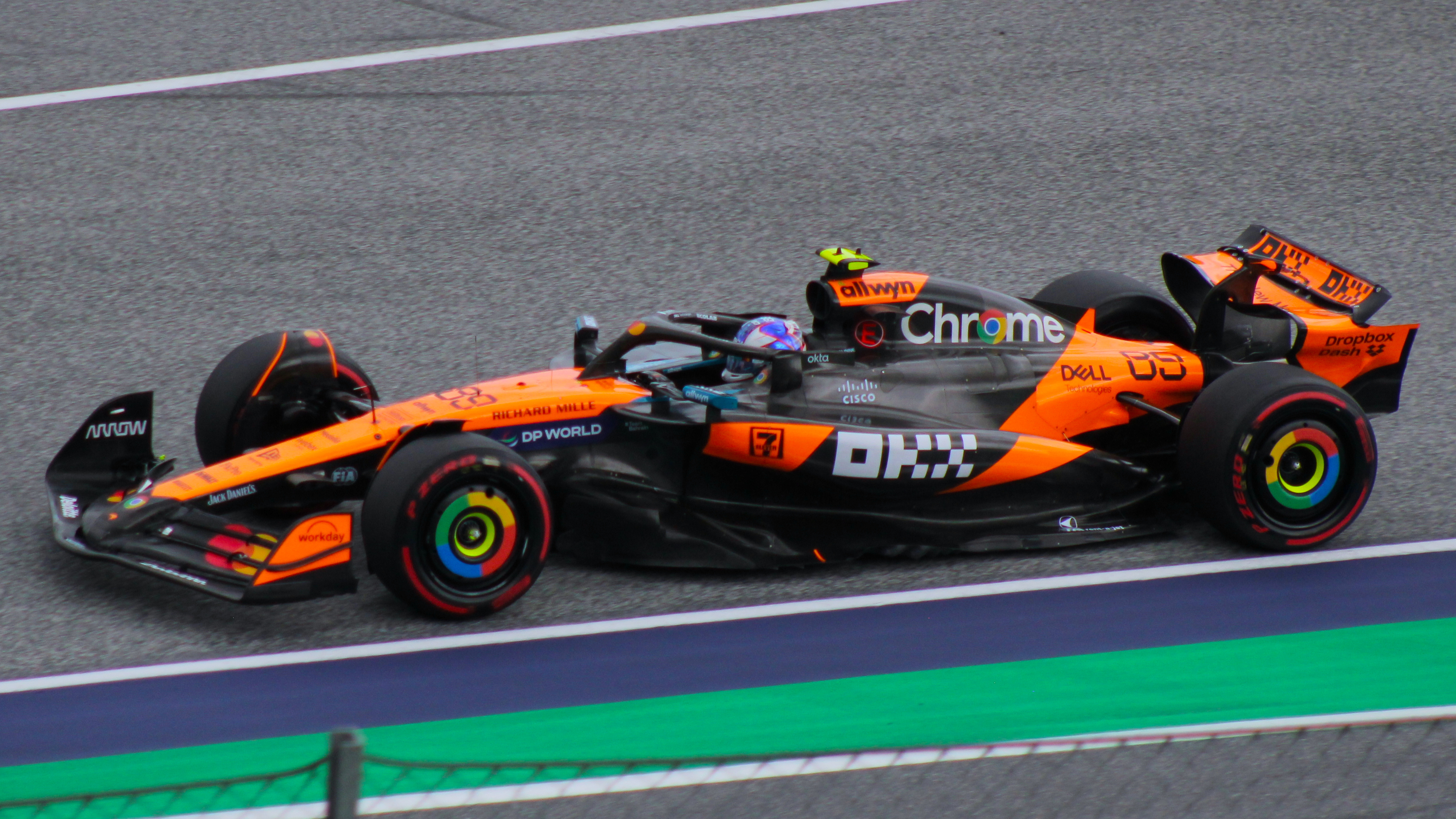
Alex Dunne made his free practice debut at the Austrian Grand Prix in the MCL39.

Before the Austrian Grand Prix, Houldey confirmed another set of minor upgrades to Norris's car, specifically around the rear suspension, claiming that "We've added something we believe will offer more stability at corner entry". Norris qualified on pole position while Piastri qualified third. Norris won and Piastri finished second.

=== Mid-season rounds ===
McLaren had unveiled another special livery for the British Grand Prix based on their mid-2000s and early-2010s chrome liveries as well as the team's "Triple Crown" livery from the 2023 Monaco Grand Prix (see § Liveries).Piastri and Norris qualified second and third respectively. Both drivers overtook Verstappen early in the race. During a safety car restart, Piastri braked heavily, forcing Verstappen to take evasive action and temporarily overtake Piastri. Piastri received a ten-second time penalty for this, but finished in second. Norris took victory, shortening the WDC gap to 8 points.

At the Belgian Grand Prix, another upgrade was made to the rear wing to improve the overall efficiency "across a similar drag range". Piastri qualified on pole for the sprint and Norris third. Piastri finished second and Norris kept third position. Norris qualified on pole and Piastri second for the Grand Prix. The race began with a rolling start on lap 5 (first 4 laps behind the safety car) after an initial delay of about 80 minutes due to standing water on the track. Piastri overtook Norris on lap 5 and the drivers finished first and second respectively.

At the Hungarian Grand Prix, Piastri qualified second and Norris third. In the race, Piastri took the lead shortly after the second pit stop cycle, while Norris switched to a one-stop strategy, which proved superior. Piastri was unable to retake first place from Norris, and finished second.

Piastri led the Dutch Grand Prix from lights to flag, taking his first grand chelem, while Norris, who was behind him, suffered a late-stage oil leak. Norris was classified in eighteenth, having completed 90% of the race prior to his retirement.

Norris and Piastri finished second and third at Italian Grand Prix. Norris's fastest lap was the fastest race lap in Formula One history, averaging 257.781 km/h (160.178 mph) and beating Rubens Barrichello's record from the 2004 Italian Grand Prix.

=== Closing rounds ===
McLaren found itself an opportunity to secure the WCC at the Azerbaijan Grand Prix, but errors from each driver meant that they could not clinch the title; Piastri crashed early in Q3 and on lap 1 and subsequently retired from both sessions, while Norris bumped the wall and lost time on his final Q3 lap, meaning he could only qualify P7, a position he stayed at in the race.

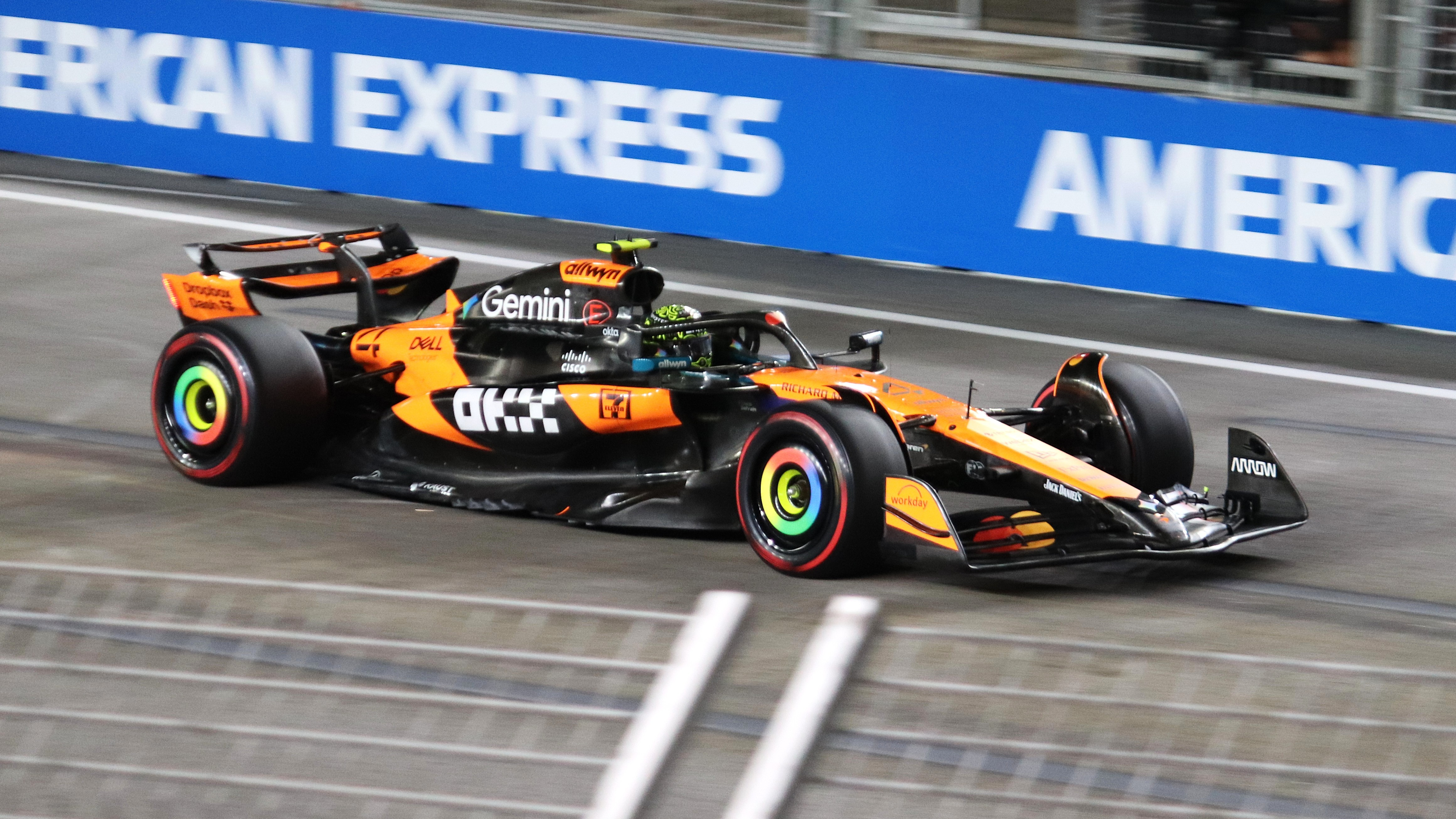
Norris during free practice for the Singapore Grand Prix. The team sealed the Constructors' Championship at this event.

At the Singapore Grand Prix, Piastri qualified third and Norris fifth. The two collided on the opening lap leaving Norris with a track position advantage, which became a point of controversy. A race result of third and fourth meant that McLaren won the WCC. This was the first time McLaren won the WCC back-to-back since 1991, and was their tenth win, making them the second most successful Formula One constructor by WCC wins.

McLaren ran a Google Gemini livery for the United States weekend (see § Liveries). After taking high positions for the sprint, the team suffered their first double retirement since the 2022 São Paulo Grand Prix after a lap one shunt. In the Grand Prix, Norris finished second and Piastri fifth. When questioned about further development of the MCL39, amid Verstappen's championship charge, Stella stated that there would be no further upgrades to the car.

The Google Gemini livery remained for the Mexico City Grand Prix (see § Liveries). At his home track, Pato O'Ward drove in the free practice session in place of Norris. During the Grand Prix, Norris converted pole position to a win, winning by over 30 seconds after a late-stage virtual safety car period. Piastri recovered to fifth from a qualifying position of eighth. Norris took the lead of the WDC from Piastri by a single point.

Norris took pole position at the São Paulo Grand Prix for both the sprint and the Grand Prix, which he converted to a win both times. In the sprint, Piastri crashed out from third place after he spun on a wet kerb. Piastri qualified fourth in the main race, but received a penalty after locking up into a Mercedes car, causing it to hit a Ferrari, taking the latter out of the race. Piastri was penalised for the move, dropping him down to seventh, but he recovered to fifth. By dominating both races throughout the weekend, Norris effectively increased his championship lead over Piastri to 24 points; the latter's gap to closest rival Verstappen was lowered to 25 points.

Norris took his third consecutive pole position at the wet qualifying session of the Las Vegas Grand Prix with Piastri in fifth, but lost the lead at the race start to Verstappen. He finished second and Piastri fourth, but the whole team would suffer a setback as both drivers would be disqualified from the race results, the first time both McLarens were disqualified in a race, due to their cars having excessive plank wear. Despite their disqualifications, Norris remained atop the Drivers' Championship standings, and Piastri, on countback of best results, retained his pre-event standing of second place in the Drivers' Championship ahead of Verstappen, who was now on equal points with him. The gap to Norris remained at 24 points. The team said it would launch an investigation into the causes of the excessive plank wear, and Andrea Stella apologised to both drivers for the disqualifications.

Piastri won the Qatar Grand Prix sprint race. Piastri qualified on pole and Norris second for the Grand Prix. Norris fell to third at the race start. The Qatar Grand Prix was unique in 2025 for mandating a 25-lap limit on any set of tyres: given the race was 57 laps, as such this necessitated a minimum of two stops. All teams other than McLaren pitted their cars for their first stops after an early safety car, a decision which ultimately relegated Piastri to finishing second and Norris fourth.

The MCL39 featured a special fan-designed livery for the Abu Dhabi Grand Prix (see § Liveries). O'Ward drove in the first free practice session in place of Piastri, the final replacement required to fulfill McLaren's rookie driver obligations. Norris and Piastri qualified second and third respectively. In the race, Piastri passed Norris for second, which stood until the line. Norris' third-place finish was sufficient to secure the WDC, his maiden championship win and McLaren's first since 2008.

The car remained at Yas Marina Circuit for post-season testing. Norris and Piastri drove a modified version of the MCL39 adapted to simulate the 2026 cars to test tyres for sole supplier Pirelli. O'Ward tested the MCL39 in its ordinary specification.

== Assessment and characteristics ==
The car was recognised early in the season for its high aerodynamic downforce, efficiency, and balance, whereas its immediate competitors often struggled to maintain balance through corners and maintain efficiency at different speeds. Defending World Drivers' Champion Max Verstappen said of McLaren's advantage that "Oh, it's big", and the RB21 comparatively lacked balance and especially grip. McLaren found that the car struggled on new tyres, which partly explained some early qualifying difficulties, which required some adjustments to car set-up.

The MCL39 attracted significant attention for its rear brake duct designs, especially from rival constructor Red Bull Racing who filed protests with the Fédération Internationale de l'Automobile (FIA). The FIA investigated and confirmed the design was fully compliant. Although the details of its design are not publicly known, the MCL39's ducts allow it to manage rear tyre temperatures far better than the rest of the field, especially noticeable at circuits that place high thermal stress on the rear tyres. Gary Anderson suggested that alternatively, the advantage could be partly attributed to car's rear suspension better controlling lift, giving the car a higher rear roll centre and improving traction out of low-speed corners.

That both drivers were in contest for the WDC until the final race of the season provoked significant scrutiny on and controversy around the car's development and McLaren's operations, and was even mentioned in an Australian Senate Estimates hearing. The Australian published a list of five pit stops it argued cost Piastri a total of 32 points in the WDC, while remaining critical of the prevalence of "conspiracy theories" that McLaren had favoured Norris.

== Later use ==
Norris was given one of his MCL39s in 2026 as part of a contract extension deal. McLaren used the car in its testing of previous cars (TPC) programme in October 2026. Reserve drivers Leonardo Fornaroli and Jake Hughes completed 58 and 52 laps of Circuit Paul Ricard, respectively.

== Complete Formula One results ==
Key

Key
Colour	Result
Gold	Winner
Silver	Second place
Bronze	Third place
Green	Other points position
Blue	Other classified position
Blue	Not classified, finished (NC)
Purple	Not classified, retired (Ret)
Red	Did not qualify (DNQ)
Black	Disqualified (DSQ)
White	Did not start (DNS)
White	Race cancelled (C)
Blank	Did not practice (DNP)
Blank	Excluded (EX)
Blank	Did not arrive (DNA)
Blank	Withdrawn (WD)
Blank	Did not enter (empty cell)
Annotation	Meaning
P	Pole position
F	Fastest lap
Superscript number	Points-scoring position in sprint

Year	Entrant	Engine	Tyres	Drivers	Grands Prix																								Points	WCC
Year	Entrant	Engine	Tyres	Drivers	AUS	CHN	JPN	BHR	SAU	MIA	EMI	MON	ESP	CAN	AUT	GBR	BEL	HUN	NED	ITA	AZE	SIN	USA	MXC	SAP	LVG	QAT	ABU	Points	WCC
2025	McLaren F1 Team	Mercedes-AMG; F1 M16 E Performance; 1.6 V6 t	P	(United Kingdom) Lando Norris	1^{P}^{F}	2^{8 F}	2	3	4^{F}	2^{1 F}	2	1^{P}^{F}	2	18†	1^{P}	1	2^{3 P}	1	18†	2^{F}	7	3	2	1^{P}	1^{1 P}	DSQ^{P}	4^{3}	3	833	1st
2025	McLaren F1 Team	Mercedes-AMG; F1 M16 E Performance; 1.6 V6 t	P	(Australia) Oscar Piastri	9	1^{2 P}	3	1^{P}^{F}	1	1^{2}	3^{P}	3	1^{P}^{F}	4	2^{F}	2^{F}	1^{2}	2	1^{P}^{F}	3	Ret	4	5	5	5	DSQ	2^{1 P F}	2	833	1st
