= Giorgio Piola =

Italian journalist (born 1948)

- Born: November 1, 1948 (age 77); Genoa, Liguria, Italy
- Occupations: Journalist; illustrator; commentator
- Years active: 1969–present

Giorgio Piola (born 1 November 1948) is an Italian Formula One journalist, illustrator, and sports commentator.

== Career ==
Piola first began reporting in 1969 for Italian magazine La Gazzetta dello Sport, where he was appointed the chief editor of the magazine's car section. That year's Monaco Grand Prix was the first Formula One race Piola attended, and by 1972 he had begun reporting for various other publications, including the Italian magazine Autosprint, British magazine Autosport, and French magazine Sport Auto. Since then, Piola has attended over 800 Grands Prix, continuously providing illustrations and technical drawings of Formula One cars.

Piola told the German magazine Autosport in 2020 that his passion for drawing began at an early age. Later in life, he dedicated his drawings solely to Formula One cars, of which he considers his drawing of the Lotus 72 the most significant. From 1994 to 2018, Piola biennially published a book dedicated to analysing the technical details of Formula One cars of the past two seasons.

Piola has also provided commentary for Rai Sport, joining the channel in 2013 as a technical analyst until his departure in 2017.

== Personal life ==
Piola entered, but did not finish university, eventually dropping out to attend Formula One Grands Prix. He speaks English and French fluently.

== Works ==
- Piola, G. (2018). Formula 1: technical analysis 2016–2018. Milan: Giorgio Nada Editore. ISBN 9788879116848, OCLC 1063534584.
