= Neil Houldey =

British Formula One engineer

- Occupation: Engineer
- Employer: McLaren Racing
- Known for: Formula One engineer
- Title: Technical Director - Applied Engineering

Neil Houldey is a British Formula One engineer. He was formerly the Technical Director - Applied Engineering for the McLaren Racing Formula One team.

== Career ==
Houldey's passion for motor racing began during a year spent building the ‘Rocket’ at the Light Car Company before university, which led him to study Automotive Engineering at Loughborough University, graduating in 2000.

Houldey started his career in motorsports at Lola Cars, progressing quickly from Design Engineer to Project Leader. He then joined McLaren Racing where he advanced to become Team Leader for Front Suspension and Driver Controls by 2008, later serving as Design Project Leader and Deputy Head of Design. He also chaired the “concept group,” shaping future car designs. In 2022, as Director of Car Concept and Performance Development, he united the Aero, Design, and Vehicle Performance teams to boost the car’s performance. In 2024 Houldey became Technical Director - Engineering. In October 2026, he was replaced by Mark Ingham who assumed the title of "Technical Director - Engineering Delivery".
