= McLaren MCL33 =

2018 Formula One racing car

- The MCL33, driven by Fernando Alonso, during the Spanish Grand Prix
- Category: Formula One
- Constructor: McLaren
- Designers: Tim Goss (Chief Technical Officer); Matt Morris (Engineering Director); Peter Prodromou (Aerodynamics Director); Mark Ingham (Head of Vehicle Design); Stefano Sordo (Head of Vehicle Performance); Guillaume Cattelani (Head of Aerodynamics)
- Predecessor: McLaren MCL32
- Successor: McLaren MCL34

Technical specifications
- Chassis: Carbon fibre composite monocoque with survival cell
- Suspension (front): Carbon fibre wishbone and pushrod suspension elements operating inboard torsion bar and dampers
- Suspension (rear): Carbon fibre wishbone and pullrod suspension elements operating inboard torsion bar and dampers
- Length: 5,480 mm (216 in; 18 ft)
- Width: 2,000 mm (79 in; 7 ft)
- Height: 950 mm (37 in; 3 ft)
- Axle track: 2,000 mm (79 in; 7 ft) front and rear + excluding tyres
- Wheelbase: 3,580 mm (141 in; 12 ft) with -/+25 mm (0.9843 in) adjustable by adjusting the toe depending on circuit layout
- Engine: Mecachrome-built and assembled Renault R.E.18 1.6 L (98 cu in) direct injection V6 turbocharged engine limited to 15,000 RPM in a mid-mounted, rear-wheel drive layout
- Electric motor: Renault kinetic and thermal energy recovery systems
- Transmission: McLaren 8-speed + 1 reverse sequential seamless semi-automatic paddle shift with epicyclic differential and multi-plate limited slip clutch
- Battery: Renault lithium-ion battery
- Weight: 733 kg (1,616 lb)
- Fuel: BP Ultimate (Note: McLaren signed a technical partnership with Petrobras that will see the company supply fuel and lubricants to the team from 2019. As part of the agreement, Petrobras branding appears on the MCL33, but the car uses BP fuels and Castrol lubricants.)
- Lubricants: Castrol EDGE Supercar
- Brakes: Akebono brake-by-wire system with carbon discs and pads
- Tyres: Pirelli P Zero dry slick and Pirelli Cinturato treaded intermediate and wet tyres Enkei 13" magnesium racing wheels
- Clutch: AP Racing electro-hydraulically operated, carbon multi-plate

Competition history
- Notable entrants: McLaren F1 Team
- Notable drivers: 2. (Belgium) Stoffel Vandoorne; 14. (Spain) Fernando Alonso
- Debut: 2018 Australian Grand Prix
- Last event: 2018 Abu Dhabi Grand Prix
Races	Wins	Podiums	Poles	F/Laps
21	0	0	0	0

The McLaren MCL33 is a Formula One racing car designed and constructed by McLaren to compete in the 2018 FIA Formula One World Championship. The car was driven by two-time World Drivers' Champion Fernando Alonso and Stoffel Vandoorne, with additional testing and development work carried out by the 2025 Formula One World Champion Lando Norris and McLaren's regular test driver Oliver Turvey.

The MCL33 is the first car built by McLaren to use a customer Renault engine after the team terminated its engine supply deal with Honda after three years and also first McLaren car to utilize a French-licensed engine manufacturer since the Peugeot-powered MP4/9 in 1994. It made its competitive debut at the Australian Grand Prix. The car was launched with an orange and blue livery designed as a tribute to some of the team's earliest cars.

After criticising their engine supplier in the previous seasons, a switch to customer Renault engines in 2018 exposed issues with the McLaren chassis. The car could manage just two top 10 qualifying times throughout the season, both by Fernando Alonso, and the team's drivers were eliminated 21 times in the first qualifying session. McLaren had the second worst average qualifying ranking of any team in 2018, only ahead of Williams. Reliability however was improved from the previous year, and the team greatly benefitted from their rivals' problems to score points from the early races. The team finished sixth in the constructors' championship after Force India's points from the first 12 races were excluded. Alonso retired from Formula One at the end of the season, while Vandoorne couldn't match his own points tally from 2017 and left the sport.

== Design and development ==
=== Engine supply ===
In September 2017, McLaren terminated their full-works partnership with Honda, citing Honda's repeated failure to supply a reliable and competitive power unit as being behind the decision to end the partnership. During negotiations to secure a new supplier, Renault disclosed that they did not have the capacity to supply McLaren whilst meeting their commitments to customer teams Red Bull Racing and Scuderia Toro Rosso. As part of the agreement between Renault and McLaren, Toro Rosso ended their customer relationship with Renault and instead acquired full-works Honda engines, freeing up the existing Renault supply chain for McLaren and allowing Renault to supply the team with their 2018-specification engine, the Renault R.E.18.

==== Engine development ====
Renault made the first major updates to the R.E.18 power unit at the Canadian Grand Prix. A second upgrade, including a new MGU-K, was made available for the Austrian Grand Prix after lengthy delays; the parts had originally been scheduled for introduction in 2017, however, the new unit could not be easily fitted to all customer teams as the upgrade would require bodywork changes. The update introduced in Austria also included a bespoke qualifying mode Renault claimed was focused at maximising performance over a single lap similar to the "party mode" high-performance settings available to Mercedes-powered cars. However, after the same power unit found in the works Renault team car of Nico Hülkenberg failed during the Grand Prix, post race both drivers commented that they did not feel any notable change in power throughout qualifying and felt it gave no significant advantage.

=== Chassis design ===
The decision to change from Honda to Renault engines brought with it several challenges for the design team led by McLaren technical director Tim Goss. Where the Honda engine featured the turbocharger mounted to the back of the engine, the compressor at the front and the Motor Generator Unit-Heat positioned in the V shape of the cylinder bank, the Renault R.E.18 engine included all three components attached to the rear of the engine and thus required McLaren to change their design approach. In order to accommodate the R.E.18, McLaren had to redevelop their engine bay, gearbox and the rear suspension geometry. The R.E.18 engine allowed the team more flexibility with the size and position of the fuel cell and allowed the engine to be positioned closer to the driver, however the turbo position on the engine created difficulties as it protruded into the space occupied by the gearbox housing. The team were subsequently required to redesign the gearbox and completely overhaul the rear suspension mounting points in order to fit the engine.

The changes required to accommodate the R.E.18 allowed McLaren to develop a radical design to the rear suspension geometry. The design combined all of the upper elements of the suspension into a single piece, thus minimising the amount of bodywork in a key area of the chassis and in turn reducing drag whilst giving the team a greater degree of control over air flowing over the rear diffuser and producing more aerodynamic grip.

The switch to Renault engines resulted in some problems for the team. During pre-season testing, the MCL33 was observed to have burn marks on the rear of the engine cowling caused by the tight packaging and insufficient cooling for the peak engine temperature. The team introduced a temporary cooling package for the duration of the test ahead of a planned update to the car's bodywork, and later expressed confidence that the engine reliability issues had been resolved.

==== Mandated changes ====
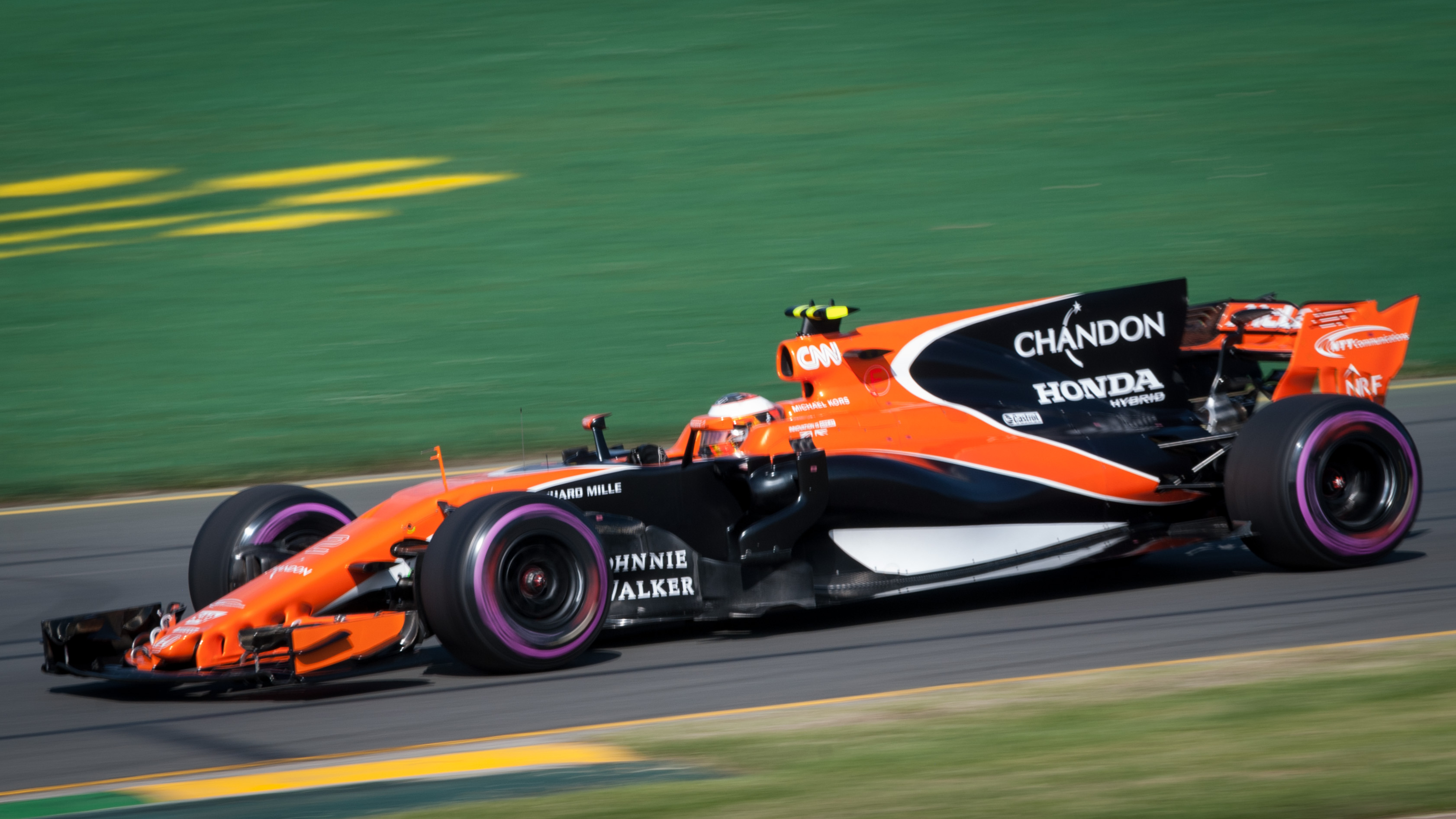

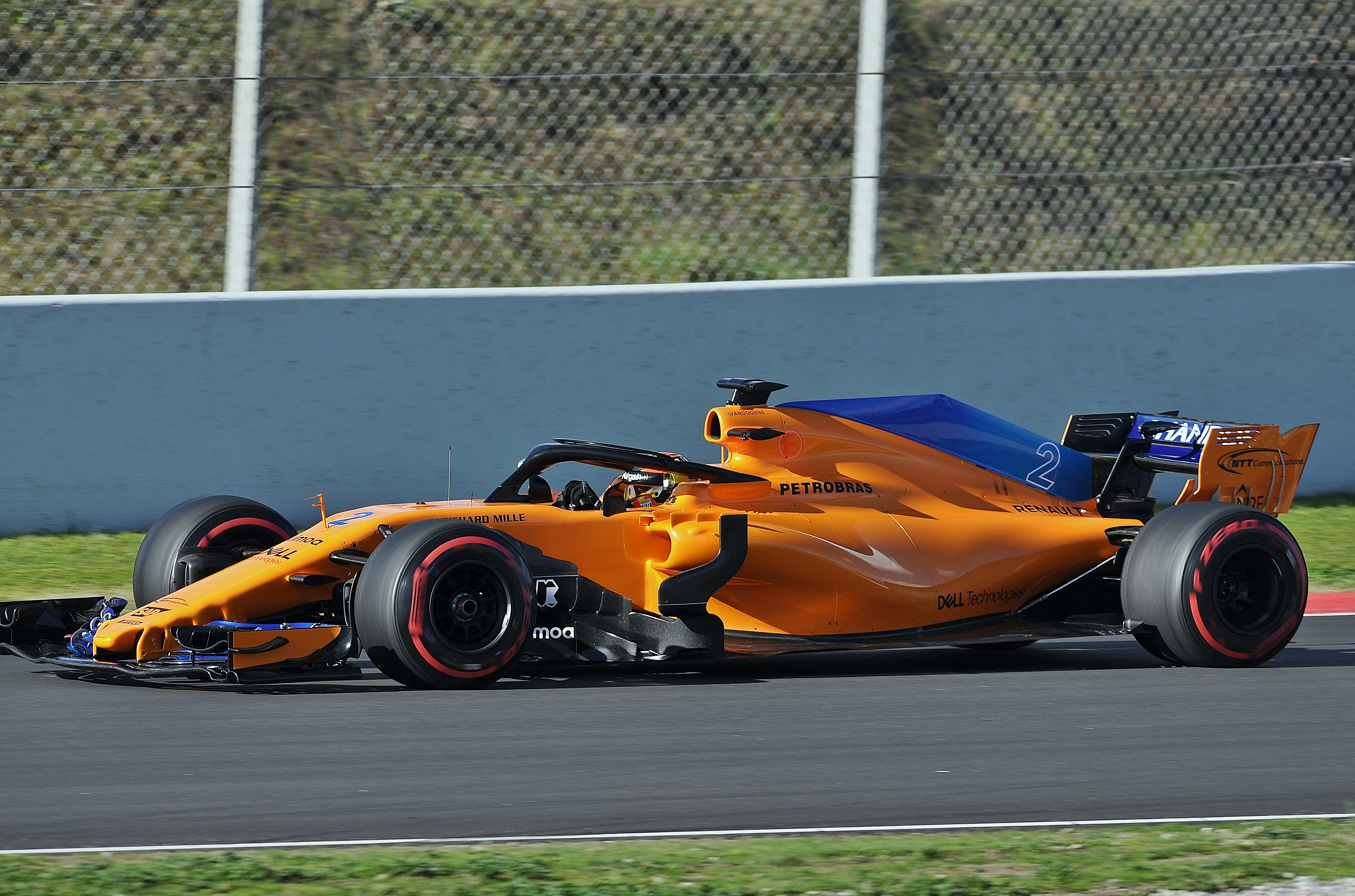
Comparison between the MCL32 (top) and the MCL33 (bottom) showing the addition of the "halo" cockpit protection device and removal of the "shark fin".

Following changes to the sport's technical regulations, the MCL33 features the "halo" cockpit protection device, a wishbone-shaped frame made of titanium that is mounted above and around the driver's head and anchored to the monocoque forward of the cockpit which is designed to improve safety by deflecting debris away from the driver. The final version of the halo weighed several kilograms and forced teams to extensively modify the chassis. Teams reported that the reinforced chassis needed to withstand the equivalent weight of a London bus in order to pass the mandatory crash tests.

The "shark fin", a carbon fibre panel extending backwards from the engine cowling was removed after McLaren lobbied to the FIA to have it written out of the technical regulations. The MCL33 was launched with a carbon fibre fin running perpendicular to the engine cowling from the airbox to the exhaust. The "t-wing", a thin horizontal wing mounted forward of and above the rear wing was also removed after the FIA banned its use for the 2018 championship.

=== Development history ===
==== Early development ====
Prior to the car's launch, McLaren announced plans for an extensive aerodynamic update to be introduced for the opening round of the championship in Australia. However, the team later admitted that their reliability issues during pre-season testing had forced them to delay the introduction of planned upgrades until the second round in Bahrain. The updates featured revisions to the front wing that were aimed at stabilising the airflow over the car and a new design for the bargeboards and turning vanes that was modelled on a concept pioneered by Red Bull Racing and Ferrari in 2017. Following the Chinese Grand Prix, team principal Eric Boullier stated that the team's planned schedule of updates meant that the "real" MCL33 would not appear until the Spanish Grand Prix. The team underwent staffing changes ahead of the Azerbaijan Grand Prix, with director of chassis development Tim Goss leaving the team.

==== Mid-season development ====
The team introduced its first major update at the Spanish Grand Prix, which featured revised bargeboards and a new front wing. The most substantial changes were focused on the nose, which included grooved channels along the sides, a ducted nose tip and a rearward-facing "cape" designed to funnel air across the car's floor. Commentators noted that the upgrade package integrated concepts originally developed for the Red Bull Racing RB14, Sauber C37 and Force India VJM11. Fernando Alonso praised the upgrades, noting that the car was "much better" than in previous races. However, after difficult races in Canada and France, the team began to suspect that there was a fault in the car's aerodynamics. Unable to find the problem in the windtunnel, they were forced to resort to experimenting with various setups during free practice sessions in an effort to try and find it.

== Competition history ==
=== Pre-season testing ===
The MCL33 made its track début at the Circuito de Navarra in Spain where it completed a shakedown before moving to the Circuit de Barcelona-Catalunya for pre-season testing. Fernando Alonso reacted positively after the first day of testing, highlighting the Renault R.E.18 engine was an evolution of the established R.E.17 model. However, the team struggled with several technical problems—including electrical and hydraulic faults—that limited the car's running. McLaren were forced to defend their design when it was suggested that their reliability issues had been triggered by an inherent flaw in the chassis as the Toro Rosso STR13, which used the Honda engines McLaren had abandoned, had run throughout pre-season testing without interruption. At the conclusion of testing, the MCL33 had completed less mileage than any other car—just 2,788 km (1,732.4 mi) compared to the 4,481 km (2,784.4 mi) completed by Mercedes, who completed the most mileage across the eight days of testing—and McLaren admitted that they were underprepared for the season.

=== Opening rounds ===
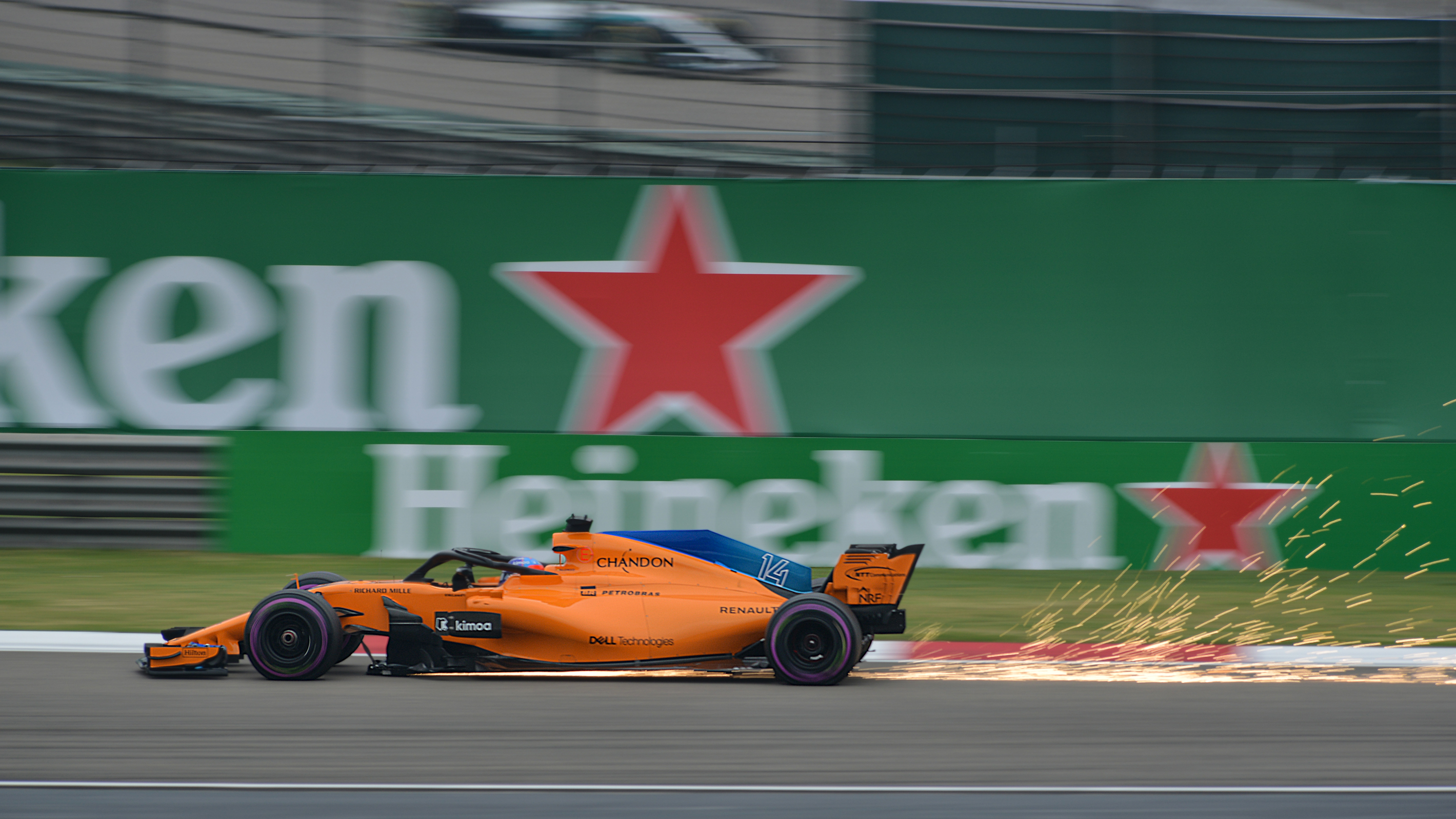
Alonso at the Chinese Grand Prix, where he finished seventh.

In the week before the Australian Grand Prix, Alonso predicted that the race would be the most difficult of the championship for McLaren. Despite this, he and Vandoorne qualified in eleventh and twelfth place, which became tenth and eleventh following the application of penalties to other drivers. Alonso went on to finish fifth and Vandoorne ninth, scoring a combined total of twelve points. In doing so, the MCL33 scored more points in a single race than its predecessor, the Honda-powered MCL32, had in any race in 2017 and matched the best result the team had scored while using Honda engines in the past three seasons. The team acknowledged that circumstances—such as the twin retirements of the Haas cars, both of which had been ahead of the McLarens prior to their retirement—had contributed to the result as much as the MCL33's performance and that there was more to come from the chassis an engine package, but that the result was in line with their expectations for the race.

Alonso and Vandoorne qualified in thirteenth and fourteenth for the next race in Bahrain as the team struggled with a lack of grip. The race saw Alonso and Vandoorne finish in seventh and eighth, scoring another ten points and claiming third place from Red Bull Racing in the World Constructors' Championship standings. Alonso and Vandoorne qualified in thirteenth and fourteenth once more in China, as the team struggled with excess drag, particularly on the circuit's long back straight. Alonso finished the race in seventh courtesy of a late pass on Sebastian Vettel while Vandoorne finished in thirteenth after he made a poor start. Alonso qualified thirteenth in Azerbaijan—which became twelfth after Nico Hülkenberg received a grid penalty—and Vandoorne sixteenth. Alonso was involved in a first-lap incident with Hülkenberg and Sergey Sirotkin that saw his car heavily damaged but went on to finish seventh in a race of attrition. Vandoorne struggled with tyre temperatures in the cool conditions, making several pit stops under the safety car to finish ninth.

=== Mid-season ===
Vandoorne at the Austrian Grand Prix.

Alonso qualified eighth in Spain, marking his first Q3 appearance of the year. Vandoorne missed out on Q3 and ultimately qualified eleventh. Alonso went on to finish the race in eighth place while Vandoorne retired with a gearbox failure. The result saw McLaren lose fourth place in the World Constructors' Championship to Renault. The Monaco Grand Prix saw the team's first failure to score; Alonso qualified seventh and retired with a gearbox failure, whereas Vandoorne qualified twelfth and finished outside the points in fourteenth. The team struggled in Canada, with Alonso and Vandoorne qualifying in fourteenth and fifteenth respectively. Vandoorne finished the race in sixteenth, while Alonso retired from the second race in a row with a gearbox failure. The team experienced another difficult race in France as both cars were eliminated in the first part of qualifying, which Alonso characterised as a "disaster". Vandoorne finished the race in twelfth, one lap off the lead, while Alonso retired with a suspension failure; he was classified sixteenth overall as he had completed ninety percent of the winner's race distance.

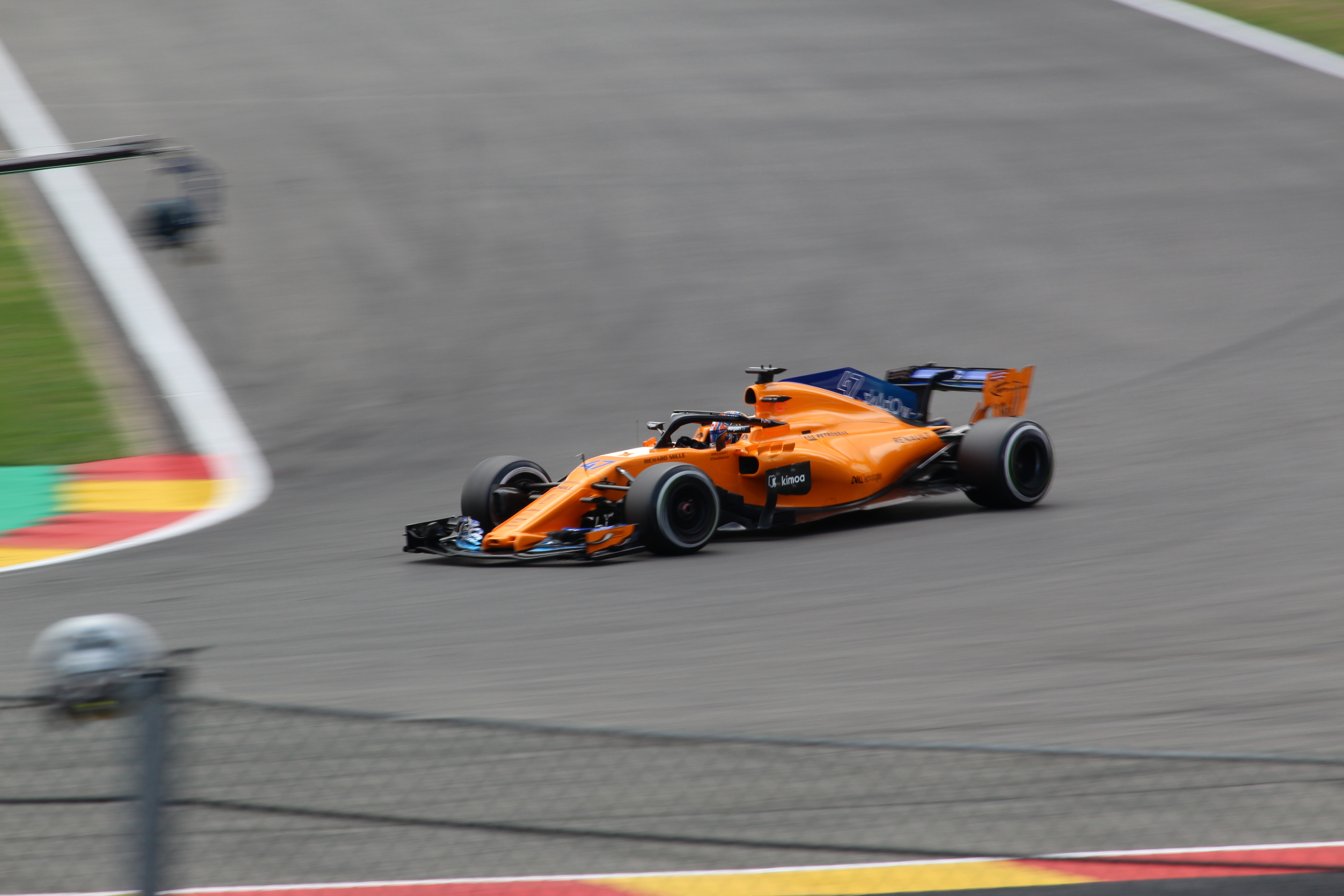
Lando Norris made his first Grand Prix weekend appearance by driving in the FP1 of the Belgian Grand Prix.

Alonso returned to the points in Austria. He qualified fourteenth but was forced to start from pit lane after the team broke parc fermé rules to replace his front wing. He took advantage of a race of attrition to finish in eighth place. Vandoorne qualified in sixteenth and retired from the race on the penultimate lap with collision damage, but was classified as finishing as he had completed ninety percent of the winner's race distance. Despite their return to the points, McLaren lost fifth place in the World Constructors' Championship to Haas. In the week before the British Grand Prix, Éric Boullier resigned from his position as team principal. His role was split in half, with Andrea Stella becoming Performance Director and Gil de Ferran the Sporting Director. The race saw Alonso and Vandoorne qualify in thirteenth and eighteenth, and finish in eighth and eleventh respectively. The result saw the team slip to seventh in the World Constructors' Championship standings, one point behind Force India.

In Germany, both drivers struggled with pace in qualifying, with Alonso starting in fourteenth and Vandoorne in seventeenth. The race proved difficult for the team, as Alonso retired late in the race due to exhaust issues, while Vandoorne finished outside the points in thirteenth. The following round in Hungary saw a stronger performance from Alonso, who benefited from retirements ahead to secure an eighth-place finish, while Vandoorne retired on lap 49 after a gearbox failure.

== Sponsorship and livery ==
In Abu Dhabi, to mark Alonso's final race (he eventually returned in 2021), Alonso's car ran with a special livery with an emblazoned yellow, red and blue stripes (representing his home region in Asturias) on the engine cover. This was the first time in 32-years that McLaren had run with a special livery since the 1986 Portuguese Grand Prix where Keke Rosberg's MP4/2C was yellow to promote the Marlboro Lights.

== Post-competition ==
In August 2021, Alonso's MCL33 was on display at the Petersen Automotive Museum in Los Angeles.

== Complete Formula One results ==
(key) (results in bold indicate pole position; results in italics indicate fastest lap)

Year	Entrant	Engine	Tyres	Drivers	Grands Prix																					Points	WCC
Year	Entrant	Engine	Tyres	Drivers	AUS	BHR	CHN	AZE	ESP	MON	CAN	FRA	AUT	GBR	GER	HUN	BEL	ITA	SIN	RUS	JPN	USA	MEX	BRA	ABU	Points	WCC
2018	McLaren F1 Team	Renault R.E.18	**P**	Alonso	5	7	7	7	8	Ret	Ret	16^{†}	8	8	16^{†}	8	Ret	Ret	7	14	14	Ret	Ret	17	11	62	6th
2018	McLaren F1 Team	Renault R.E.18	**P**	Vandoorne	9	8	13	9	Ret	14	16	12	15^{†}	11	13	Ret	15	12	12	16	15	11	8	15	14	62	6th

^{†} Driver failed to finish the race, but was classified as they had completed over 90% of the winner's race distance.
