= McLaren MCL32 =

2017 McLaren Formula One racing car

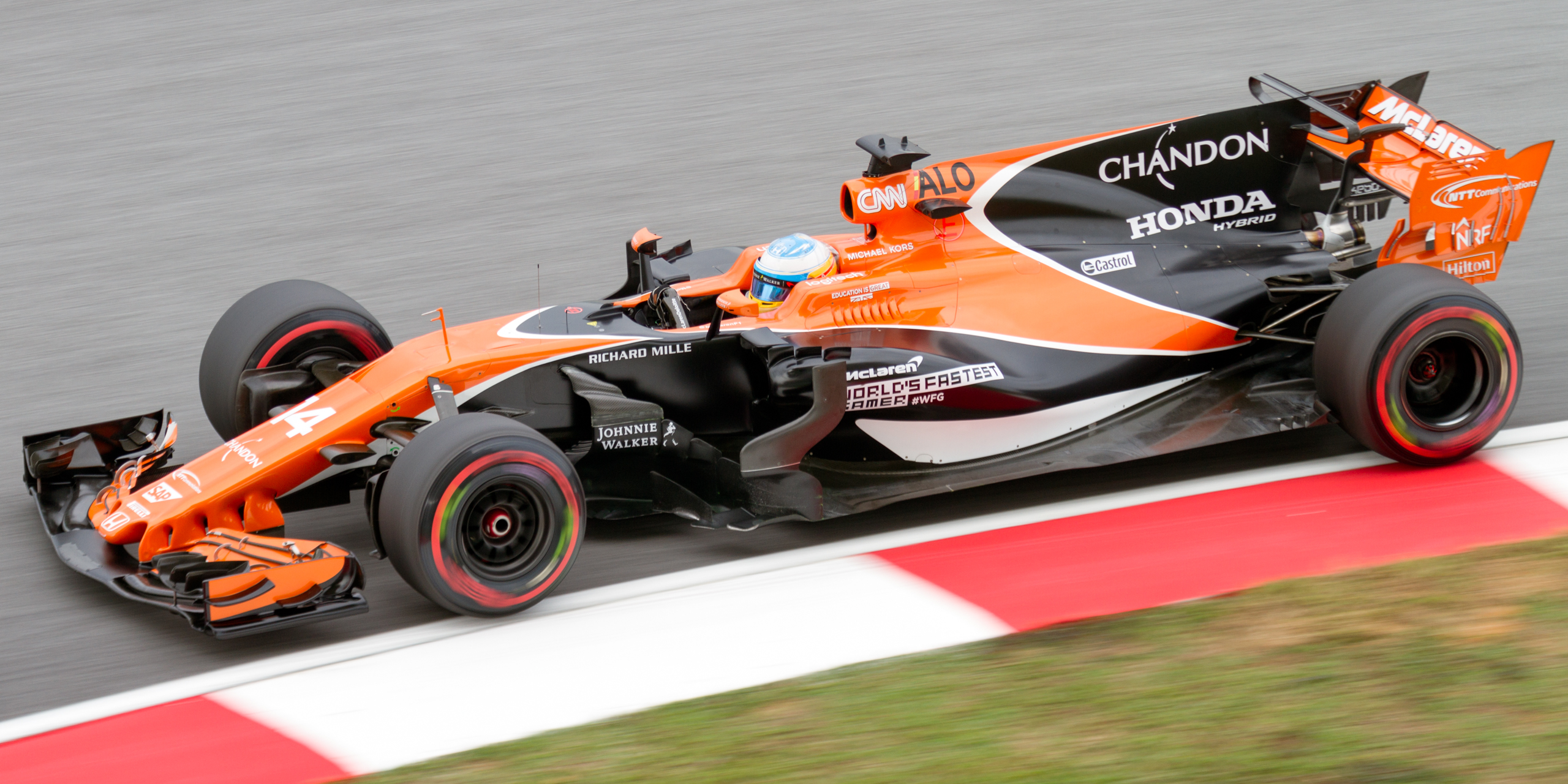
- McLaren MCL32 The MCL32, driven by Fernando Alonso, during the Malaysian Grand Prix
- Category: Formula One
- Constructor: McLaren
- Designers: Tim Goss (Chief Technical Officer); Matt Morris (Engineering Director); Peter Prodromou (Aerodynamics Director); Mark Ingham (Head of Vehicle Design); Stefano Sordo (Head of Vehicle Performance); Guillaume Cattelani (Head of Aerodynamics); Barney Hassell (Chief Engineer - Performance); Peter Schroder (Chief Engineer - Systems); Yusuke Hasegawa (Chief Technical Officer, Engine - Honda)
- Predecessor: McLaren MP4-31
- Successor: McLaren MCL33

Technical specifications
- Chassis: Carbon fibre composite survival cell
- Suspension (front): Carbon fibre wishbone and pushrod suspension elements operating inboard torsion bar and dampers (KONI dampers, springs and shock absorbers)
- Suspension (rear): Carbon fibre wishbone and pullrod suspension elements operating inboard torsion bar and dampers (KONI dampers, springs and shock absorbers)
- Length: 5,200 mm (205 in)
- Width: 2,000 mm (79 in)
- Height: 950 mm (37 in)
- Wheelbase: 3,520 mm (139 in) with -/+25 mm (0.9843 in) adjustable by adjusting the toe depending on circuit layout
- Engine: Honda RA617H 1.6 L (98 cu in) direct injection V6 turbocharged engine, limited to 15,000 rpm in a mid-mounted, rear-wheel drive layout
- Electric motor: Honda kinetic and thermal energy recovery systems
- Transmission: McLaren 8-speed + 1 reverse sequential seamless semi-automatic paddle shift with epicyclic differential and multi-plate limited slip clutch
- Battery: Honda lithium-ion batteries
- Power: 850–900 hp (634–671 kW)
- Weight: 728 kg (1,605 lb) (including driver)
- Fuel: BP Ultimate 94.25% unleaded gasoline + 5.75% biofuel
- Lubricants: Castrol EDGE Supercar
- Brakes: Carbone Industrie brake-by-wire carbon discs and pads with Akebono steel calipers
- Tyres: Pirelli P Zero dry slick and Pirelli Cinturato treaded intermediate and wet tyres Enkei 13" magnesium racing wheels
- Clutch: AP Racing electro-hydraulically operated, carbon multi-plate

Competition history
- Notable entrants: McLaren Honda Formula 1 Team
- Notable drivers: 2. (Belgium) Stoffel Vandoorne; 14. (Spain) Fernando Alonso; 22. (United Kingdom) Jenson Button
- Debut: 2017 Australian Grand Prix
- Last event: 2017 Abu Dhabi Grand Prix
Races	Wins	Podiums	Poles	F/Laps
20	0	0	0	1

The McLaren MCL32 (originally known as the McLaren MP4-32) is a Formula One racing car designed and constructed by McLaren to compete in the 2017 FIA Formula One World Championship. The car was driven by two-time World Drivers' Champion Fernando Alonso, who stayed with the team for a third season; and Stoffel Vandoorne, who joined the team after Jenson Button retired from full-time competition at the end of the 2016 season.

The MCL32 made its competitive début at the Australian Grand Prix and is the first car built by McLaren since the McLaren M30—which contested part of the 1980 season—that does not contain the "MP4" prefix as part of its chassis name. The change was introduced following CEO Ron Dennis's departure from the team's parent company, the McLaren Technology Group, in November 2016. (Note: The MP4 prefix was originally derived from the team's then-sponsor Marlboro and Dennis's Project Four Racing team when McLaren and Project Four merged in 1981.) The McLaren MCL32 car was also the first Honda-powered Formula One car to utilize afuel and lubricant supplier other than ExxonMobil since the Honda RA108 in the 2008 season when Honda utilized Elf fuel and ENEOS lubricant products. This was the last McLaren car to be fitted with a Honda engine as it was replaced by Renault engines from the 2018 until 2020 seasons.

After an improvement in the previous year, 2017 was a rough season for McLaren more akin to the kind of season the MP4-30 had endured in 2015. The cars were slow and the team's Honda engines proved to be very unreliable for much of the beginning of the season. Alonso retired from the opening two races and the team suffered double retirements in China, Monaco, and Italy. The team failed to score a point until Baku, when Alonso finished 9th, with Vandoorne picking up his first point of the season with 10th in Hungary. McLaren finished 9th in the Constructors' Championship, with 30 points, three more than their first season back with Honda power in 2015.

The MCL32 was the first McLaren F1 car not to field any British drivers regularly in the McLaren driver's line-up since the MP4-21 in 2006, when McLaren paired the Finnish Kimi Räikkönen and Colombian Juan Pablo Montoya (who was replaced mid-season by Spaniard Pedro de la Rosa) as their 2006 season drivers. It was the first McLaren F1 car featured with a shark fin since the MP4-25 in 2010.

== Design and development ==
=== Power Unit ===
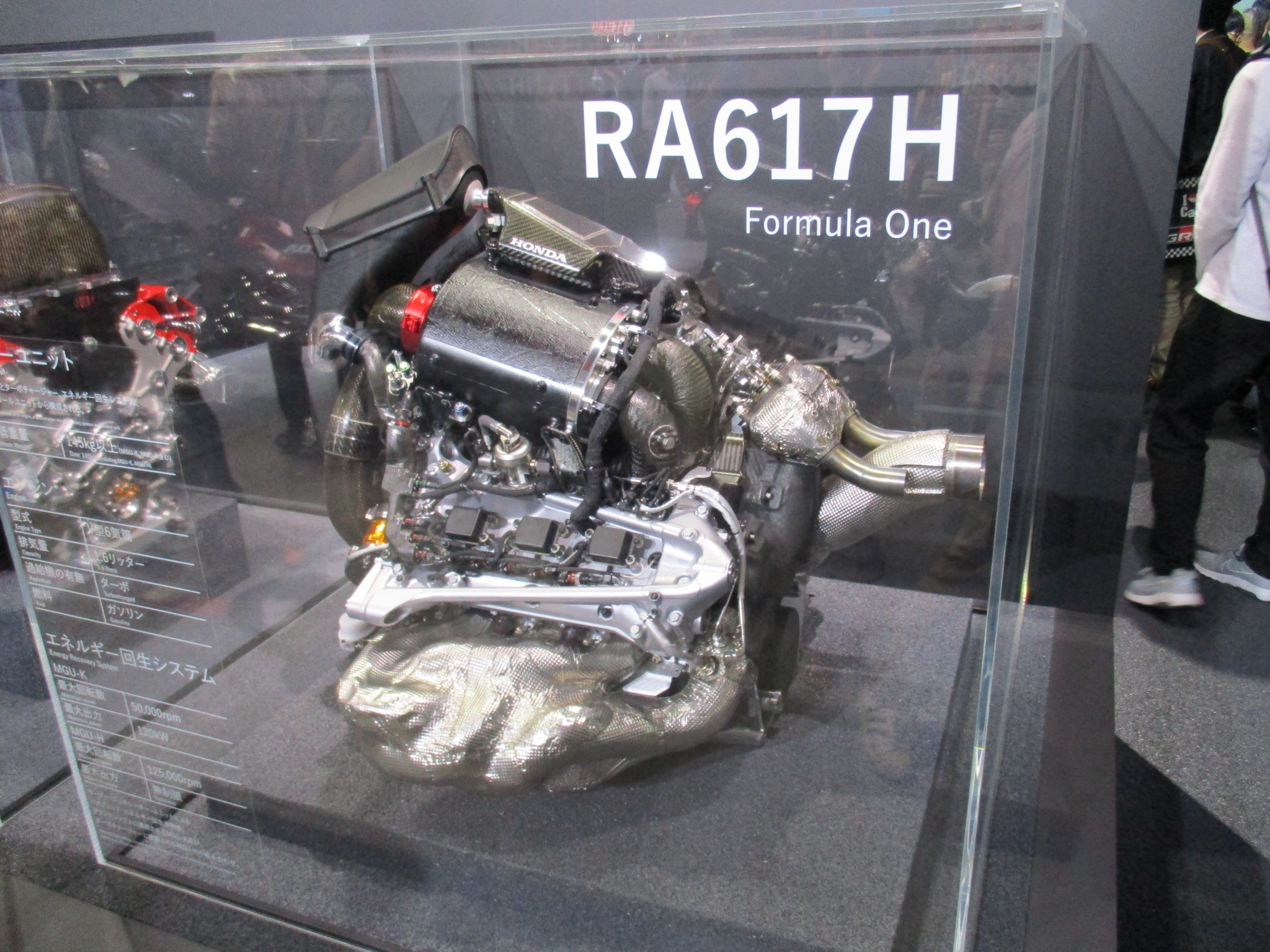
The RA617H engine which is used to power the MCL32

The Fédération Internationale de l'Automobile (FIA) amended the technical regulations for the 2017 season to abandon the token system—which limited engine development over the course of a season—first introduced in 2014, engine supplier Honda was free to extensively redesign the team's power unit, which was named the RA617H. The company started with the ultra-compact RA615H that accommodated the "size zero" concept first conceived for use in the MP4-30 chassis, but with the RA617H moved to recreate the configuration first used by Mercedes in the PU106 series of engines. Honda's Formula One project manager Yusuke Hasegawa described the new architecture for the RA617H as "very high risk", justifying the choice as being the only way to catch up to Mercedes. Hasegawa also admitted that the technology implemented into the design—particularly around the combustion concept—was not entirely understood and that its potential would take time to fully realise. While discussing the issues with the engine mid-season, Hasegawa pointed to Honda's inability to recreate racing conditions during dyno testing; their underestimating the increased stresses placed on the engine as a result of the revised technical regulations introduced for the 2017 season; and severe vibrations affecting the transmission and oil tank as the root of the RA617H's problems.

Following the Australian Grand Prix, Honda announced that work carried out between pre-season testing and the race meant that a majority of the issues that plagued them were fixed. Although the engine proved reliable over the race meeting, it had been detuned and the gearbox shift times increased to maintain reliability. Honda also revealed that a heavily revised "B-specification" engine was already in development and would be ready in as little as eight weeks, with both Honda and McLaren developing upgrades for successive Grands Prix to make up the deficit. At the Spanish Grand Prix, Honda brought an update to the power unit in the form of a revised intake system and mapping. Honda claimed this reduced the inherent drive train vibrations significantly allowing the gearbox and engine to run relatively normal in comparison to earlier races, this provided a small bump in power. Although Alonso had an excellent run in qualifying, gaining 7th position, the power unit still experienced reliability issues in early practice sessions with oil leaks and pressure issues causing stoppages. At the Azerbaijan Grand Prix, Honda introduced a redesigned MGU-H and turbo for both Alonso and Vandoorne claiming to have fixed the underlying reliability issues with those components. In addition to the new components, Honda brought one new spec engine which debuted a new fuel injection system to be used in tandem with a new BP fuel upgrade, further mapping improvements and various other minor updates for Alonso to use, however, due to the amount of penalties required to introduce the new engine, and in the interest of saving mileage on the new spec, Honda decided to limit its use to the practice sessions only, using them as test sessions to verify the engines effectiveness and for Alonso to revert to the earlier engine for qualifying and the race, albeit still with the revised MGU-H and turbo. After the Friday practice sessions had concluded, although experiencing a gearbox failure during the test, Honda remained confident and encouraged by the data the new engine showed, feeling it has made a decent step forward with the new unit while also suggesting the aim is for both drivers to have one for the next GP in Austria.

=== Technical partnerships ===
Prior to the start of the season in February 2017, McLaren secured technical partnerships with BP to provide fuel and Castrol to provide engine lubricants for the RA617H after ending their contract with ExxonMobil who left the fuel and lubricant team sponsorship for Red Bull Racing despite the MCL32 being initially designed around Esso fuel and Mobil 1 lubricants.

The MCL32 also the first McLaren car to utilize Castrol motor oil and other fluids products since the M30 in 1980.

== Competition history ==
=== Pre-season testing ===
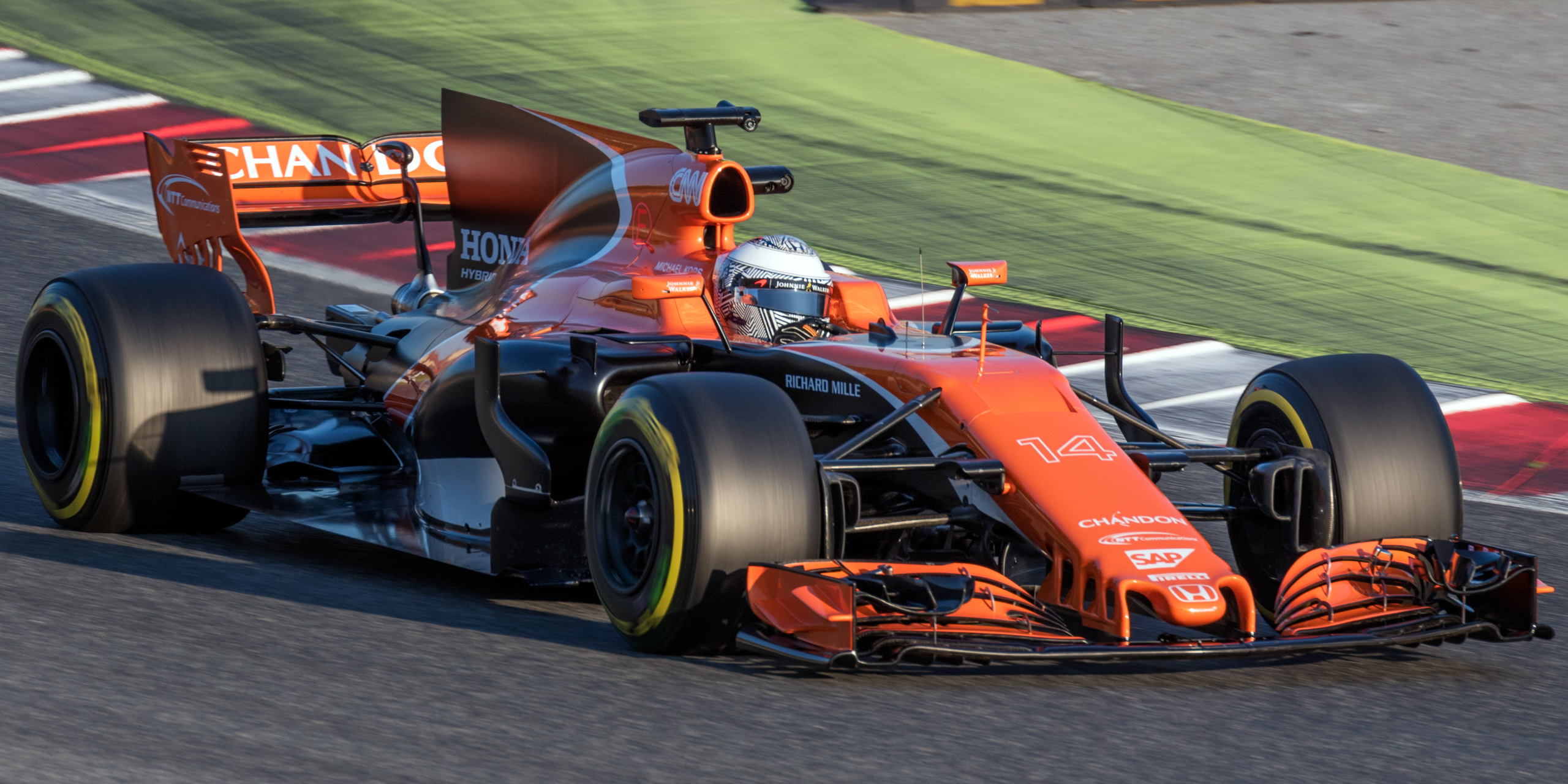
Alonso testing the MCL32 at the Circuit de Barcelona-Catalunya

As in 2015, McLaren endured a difficult pre-season during testing at the Circuit de Barcelona-Catalunya. The new RA617H, which featured a completely overhauled concept compared to the previous two seasons, was found to be unreliable, interrupting the team's preparations and preventing them from achieving consistent running. Fernando Alonso was particularly critical of the engine, complaining about lack of reliability and power. The team managed to complete only 425 laps in the eight days of testing compared to Mercedes, who completed over one thousand laps in the same period, and had used more engines during pre-season testing than they would be permitted to use during the regular season. The team's initial struggles then prompted reports that McLaren had sought out an alternative engine supplier.

=== Opening rounds ===
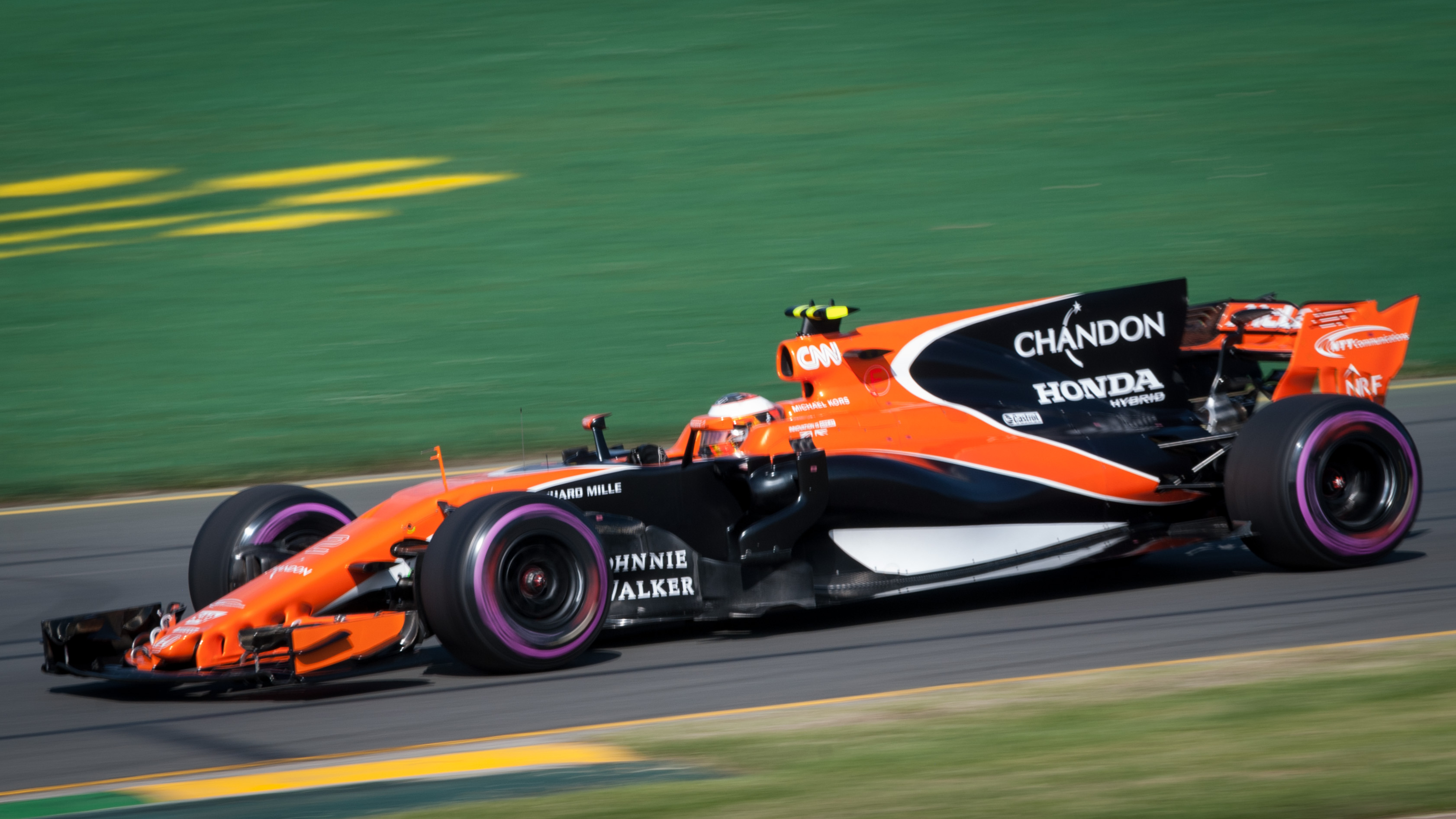
Vandoorne at the Australian Grand Prix

McLaren endured a difficult start to the season. Alonso retired from 10th with bodywork damage at the Australian Grand Prix, while Vandoorne finished 13th, despite having dashboard damage. Alonso had a good start at the next race in China, jumping up to 6th, before retiring with a driveshaft failure. Vandoorne retired with fuel system issues. Bahrain was a bad race for the team as Vandoorne couldn't start the race due to water pressure issues and Alonso retired late in the race with power unit issues. Alonso couldn't start the Russian Grand Prix because of gearbox problems, while Vandoorne finished 14th.

=== European rounds and Canada ===
At the start of the European season in Spain, Alonso qualified a strong 7th, but finished the race in 12th. Vandoorne retired after an accident. Jenson Button returned for a one-off in Monaco, replacing Alonso who is racing in the Indy 500. Button qualified an impressive 9th and Vandoorne 10th, but both drivers crash in the race (Button with suspension damage caused by punting the Sauber of Pascal Wehrlein onto its side at Portier). At the Canadian Grand Prix, Alonso was running in 10th until he retired three laps from the end with power unit issues, while Vandoorne finished 14th. Alonso scored the team's first points of the season at the Azerbaijan Grand Prix with a 9th-place finish, while Vandoorne finished 12th. Alonso retired in Austria after being hit from behind on lap 1, Vandoorne again finished in 12th.

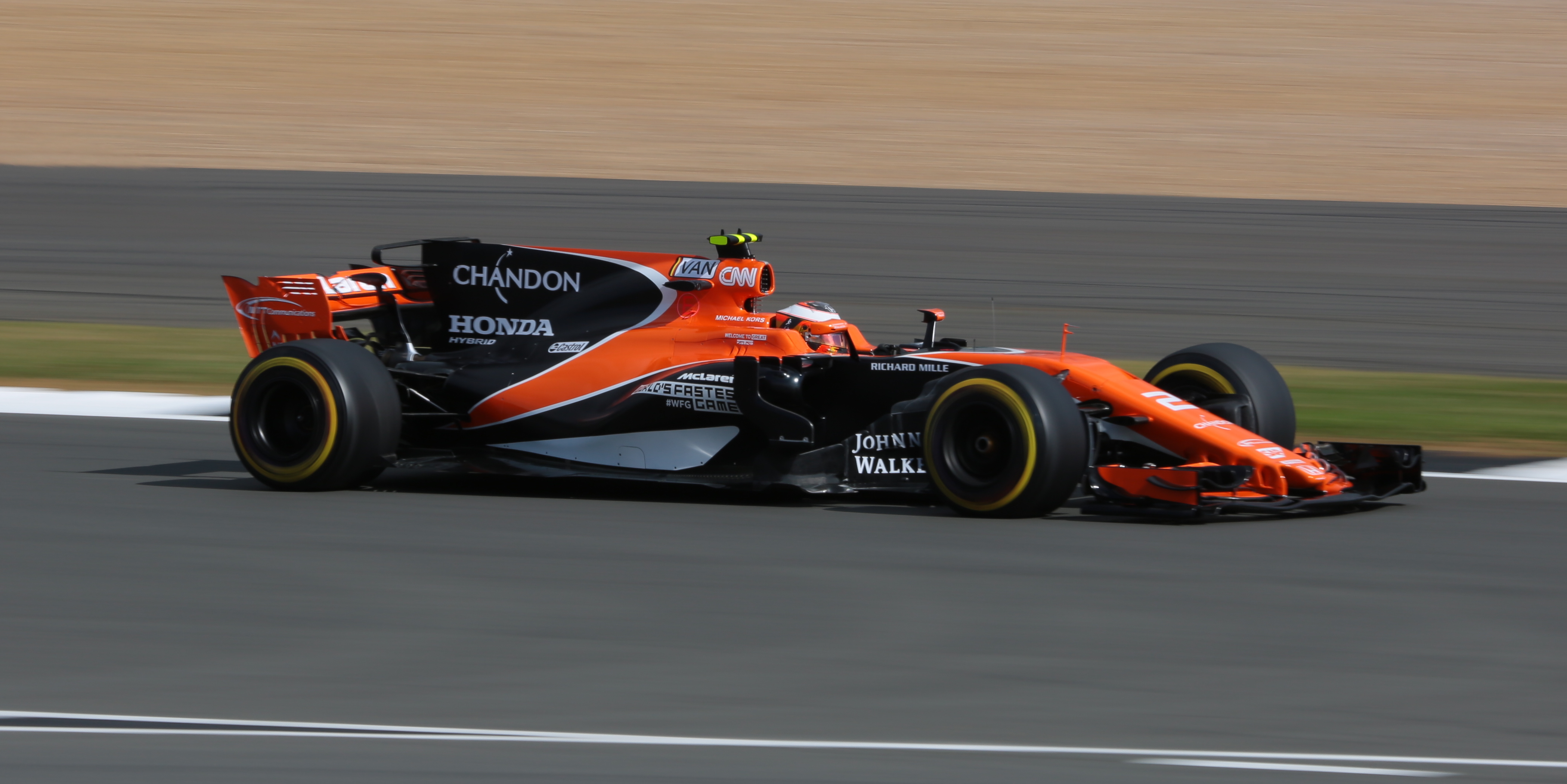
Vandoorne at the British Grand Prix

At the British Grand Prix, Vandoorne qualified 9th and finished the race 11th, meanwhile Alonso retired with a fuel pump issue. The team would have a positive weekend in Hungary. After both drivers qualified in the top 10, Alonso finished the race in 6th with the fastest lap of the race, while Vandoorne finished in 10th to score his first points of the season and make it a double points finish for the team.

At the Belgian Grand Prix, Alonso retired the car mid-race after complaining about engine problems in the radio, however, the team could not find any evidence of engine problems in Alonso's data prompting some speculation he 'gave up'. Vandoorne finished the race in fourteenth. Vandoorne qualified tenth at the Italian Grand Prix, but retired with electrical issues, while Alonso retired with clutch issues.

=== Asian rounds ===
In Singapore, both drivers qualified in the top 10, but Alonso is involved in a crash at the start of the race and retires. Vandoorne is not involved and finished in seventh position.

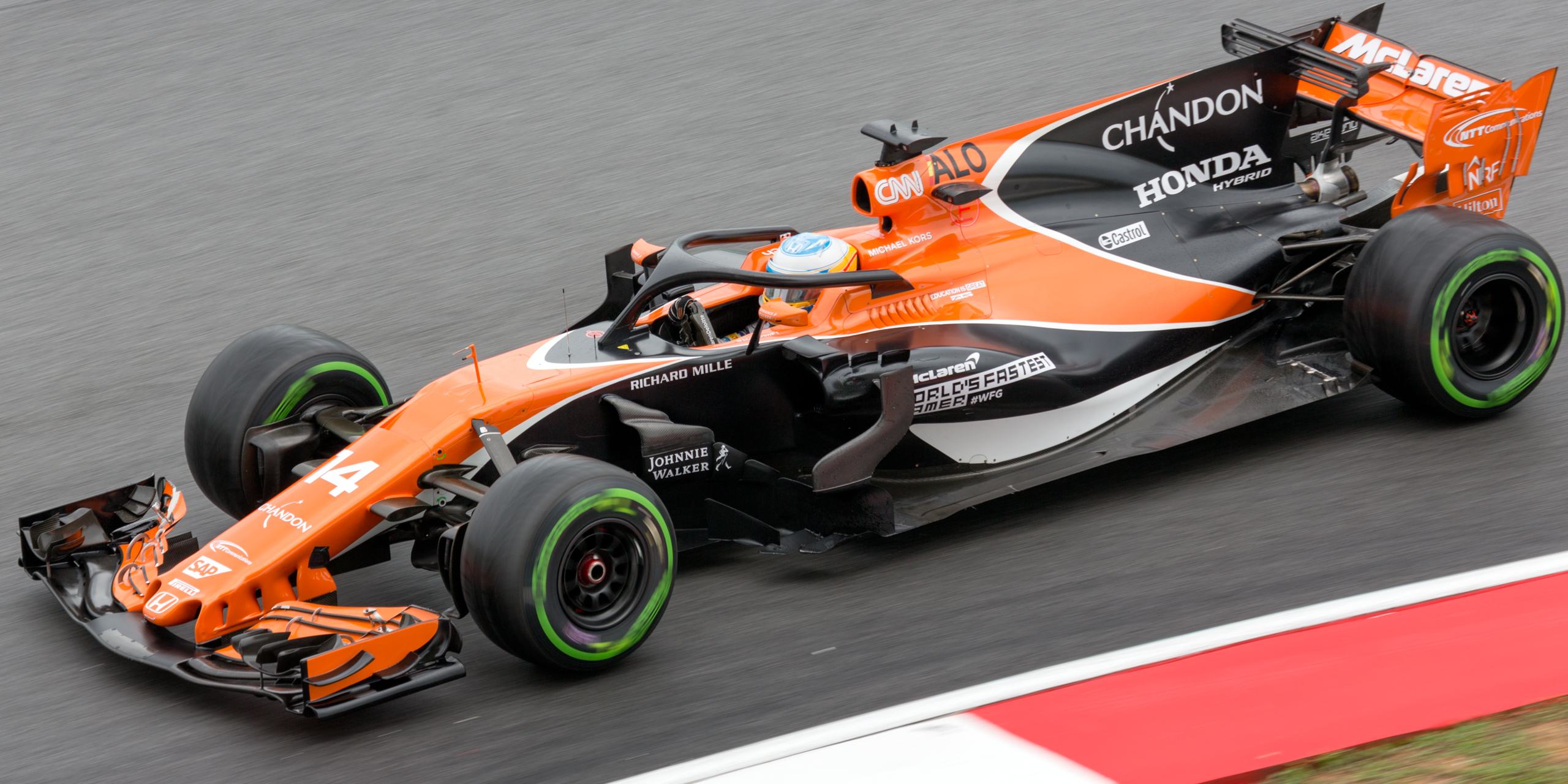
Alonso testing the Halo during the FP1 of the Malaysian Grand Prix. The safety device would eventually make its debut the following season

At the Malaysian Grand Prix, Vandoorne qualified a strong seventh, while Alonso makes it two cars in the top ten with tenth position. Vandoorne finished the race in seventh to overtake Alonso in the points, while Alonso finished eleventh. In Japan, Alonso and Vandoorne qualified tenth and eleventh respectively. The team just miss out on points with eleventh by Alonso, while Vandoorne is fourteenth.

=== Final rounds ===
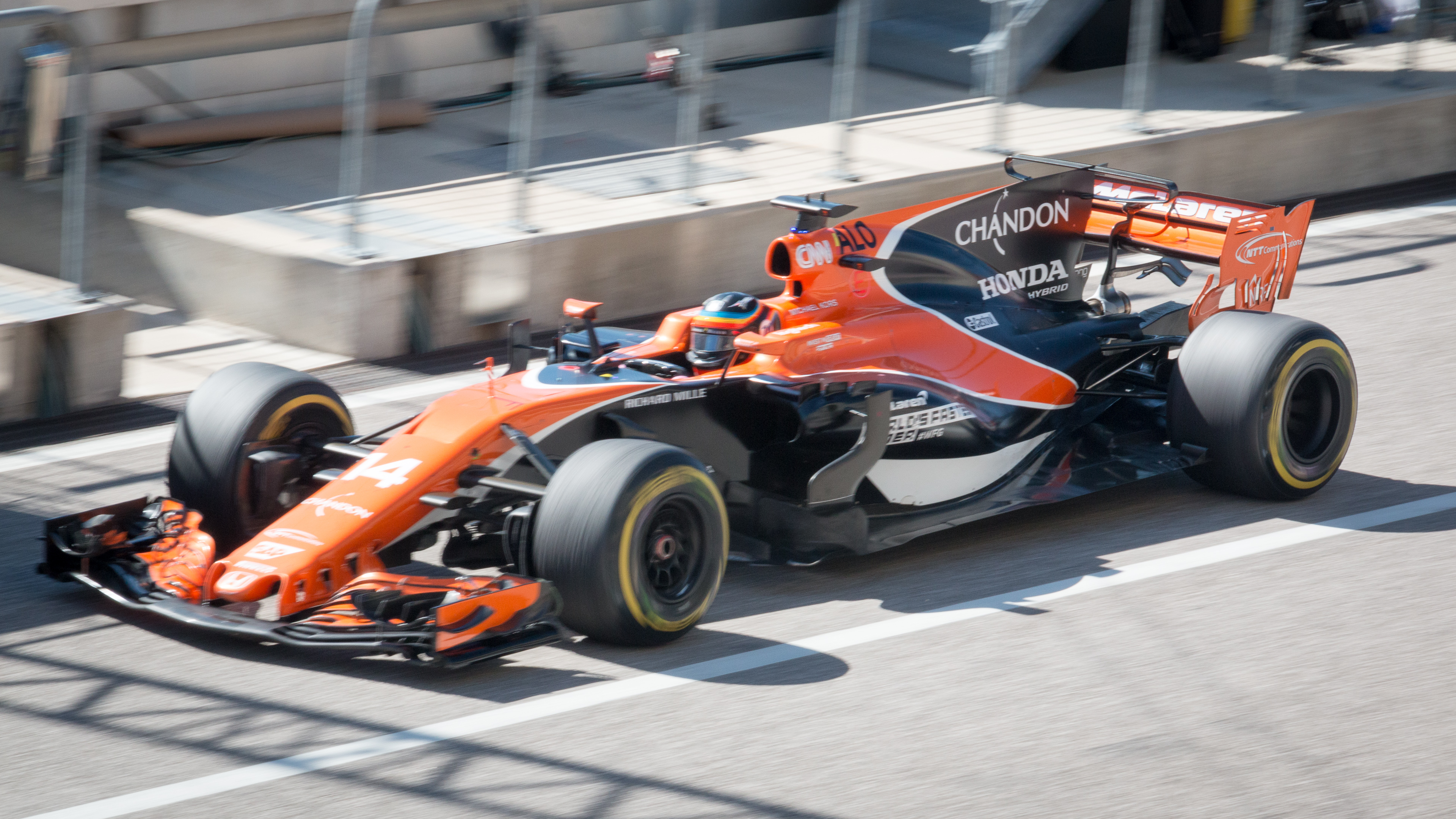
Alonso during the United States Grand Prix

Alonso qualified ninth for the United States Grand Prix, but retired from the race with engine issues. Vandoorne charged from the back of the field to finish twelfth. Alonso finished in the points again with 10th in Mexico, while Vandoorne was twelfth. Alonso converted his seventh place in qualifying to finish eighth at the Brazilian Grand Prix, overtaking Vandoorne in the points after he was involved in a collision. For the third consecutive time, Alonso finished in the points with ninth in Abu Dhabi, while Vandoorne finished the race in twelfth position.

The season ended relatively positively with the team scoring the seventh most points in the last 12 races of the season, but the bad start to the season meant that they finished a disappointing ninth in the constructors' standings with 30 points.

== Complete Formula One results ==
(key) (results in bold indicate pole position; results in italics indicate fastest lap)

Year	Entrant	Engine	Tyres	Drivers	Grands Prix																				Points	WCC
Year	Entrant	Engine	Tyres	Drivers	AUS	CHN	BHR	RUS	ESP	MON	CAN	AZE	AUT	GBR	HUN	BEL	ITA	SIN	MAL	JPN	USA	MEX	BRA	ABU	Points	WCC
2017	McLaren	Honda; RA617H	**P**																							
2017	McLaren	Honda; RA617H	**P**	Fernando Alonso	Ret	Ret	14†	DNS	12		16†	9	Ret	Ret	6	Ret	17†	Ret	11	11	Ret	10	8	9	30	9th
2017	McLaren	Honda; RA617H	**P**	Jenson Button						Ret															30	9th
2017	McLaren	Honda; RA617H	**P**	Stoffel Vandoorne	13	Ret	DNS	14	Ret	Ret	14	12	12	11	10	14	Ret	7	7	14	12	12	Ret	12	30	9th

Notes

- † – Driver failed to finish the race, but was classified as they had completed over 90% of the winner's race distance.
