= McLaren MCL34 =

2019 Formula One racing car

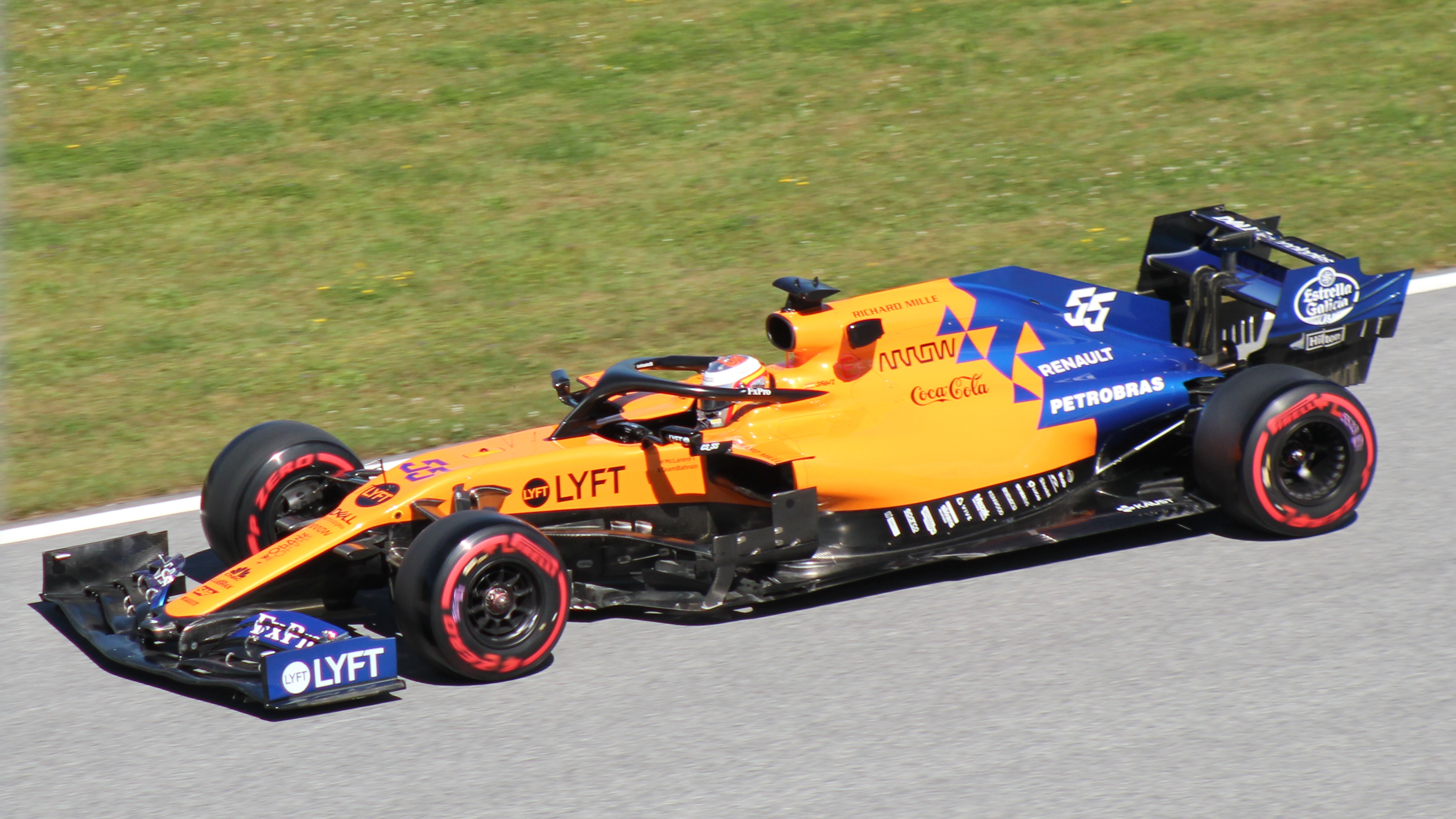
- The McLaren MCL34, driven by Carlos Sainz Jr. during the Austrian Grand Prix
- Category: Formula One
- Constructor: McLaren
- Designers: Pat Fry (Engineering Director); Andrea Stella (Performance Director); Peter Prodromou (Chief Engineer); Mark Ingham (Head of Vehicle Design); Stefano Sordo (Head of Vehicle Performance); Guillaume Cattelani (Head of Aerodynamics)
- Predecessor: McLaren MCL33
- Successor: McLaren MCL35

Technical specifications
- Chassis: Carbon fibre composite monocoque with survival cell
- Suspension (front): Carbon fibre wishbone and pushrod suspension elements operating inboard torsion bar and dampers
- Suspension (rear): Carbon fibre wishbone and pushrod suspension elements operating inboard torsion bar and dampers
- Length: Over 5,500 mm (217 in)
- Width: 2,000 mm (79 in)
- Height: 950 mm (37 in)
- Wheelbase: 3,580 mm (141 in)
- Engine: Renault E-Tech 19 1.6 L (98 cu in) direct injection V6 turbocharged engine limited to 15,000 RPM in a mid-mounted, rear-wheel drive layout
- Electric motor: Renault kinetic and thermal energy recovery systems
- Transmission: McLaren 8-speed + 1 reverse sequential seamless semi-automatic paddle shift with epicyclic differential and multi-plate limited slip clutch
- Battery: Lithium-ion battery
- Weight: 743 kg (1,638 lb) (with driver)
- Fuel: BP
- Lubricants: Castrol EDGE
- Brakes: Akebono brake-by-wire system with 6-piston calipers, carbon discs and pads
- Tyres: Pirelli P Zero dry slick and Pirelli Cinturato treaded intermediate and wet tyres Enkei 13" magnesium racing wheels
- Clutch: AP Racing electro-hydraulically operated, carbon multi-plate

Competition history
- Notable entrants: McLaren F1 Team
- Notable drivers: 4. (United Kingdom) Lando Norris; 55. (Spain) Carlos Sainz Jr.
- Debut: 2019 Australian Grand Prix
- Last event: 2019 Abu Dhabi Grand Prix
Races	Wins	Podiums	Poles	F/Laps
21	0	1	0	0

The McLaren MCL34 is a Formula One racing car designed by Pat Fry and constructed by McLaren to compete in the 2019 Formula One World Championship. The car was driven by Carlos Sainz Jr., who joined the team from the Renault Sport F1 Team; and 2018 Formula 2 Championship runner-up Lando Norris. Sainz Jr. and Norris replaced Fernando Alonso and Stoffel Vandoorne, both of whom left the team at the end of the 2018 championship. The MCL34 was powered by a Renault engine, the Renault E-Tech 19, and made its début at the 2019 Australian Grand Prix. The car was considered to be a big improvement compared to its disappointing predecessor, the MCL33, often being the best of the rest in qualifying and race trim behind the three leading teams: Mercedes, Ferrari and Red Bull.

The car's best result was at the 2019 Brazilian Grand Prix when Sainz finished third. This marked Sainz's first podium finish and McLaren's first since Kevin Magnussen and Jenson Button finished 2nd and 3rd, respectively, at the 2014 Australian Grand Prix. The result was enough to secure 4th place in the Constructors' Championship, their best finish in seven years.

== Design and development ==
=== Design team ===
Tim Goss and Matt Morris left McLaren at the end of the 2018 championship. Peter Prodromou remained in his role of chief aerodynamics engineer. Pat Fry returned to the team as engineering director; Fry had previously worked for the team between 1993 and 2010 before he moved to Ferrari. The team recruited James Key from Scuderia Toro Rosso to oversee development of the MCL34 during the season.

== Competition history ==
McLaren had a relatively successful 2019, in comparison to the 2015–2018 championships, where their best finish in the Constructors' Championship was sixth. Although Renault were favorites for "best of the rest" (the best constructor behind the then-dominant, race-winning trio of Mercedes, Ferrari and Red Bull), McLaren quickly recovered from an unlucky first few rounds to claim best of the rest with one race remaining. As the season progressed, in sharp contrast to 2018, McLaren dominated the midfield in almost every race, sometimes even breaking away from the midfield. Carlos Sainz commented how McLaren were "not only best of the rest, but [McLaren] are managing to profit if something happens to the guys in front".

=== Opening rounds ===
In the Australian Grand Prix season opening race, Norris impressed in his debut qualifying session starting in 8th, while Sainz was forced to start from the penultimate row of the grid in 18th, after being stuck in traffic on his final qualifying run. The race was less successful, Norris contested for points, however he got held up by Antonio Giovinazzi which hampered his effort, he ended the race outside of the points in 12th. Sainz retired on lap 9 with mechanical issues to his power unit.

At the next round in Bahrain, both cars managed to get into the third part of qualifying for the first time since the 2017 Malaysian Grand Prix. Sainz qualified in 7th and Norris in tenth, which later became P9, after Romain Grosjean received a three-place grid penalty for impeding Norris during qualifying. On race day, Sainz made a good start, making the jump on Kevin Magnussen, and was contesting for P5. However, Sainz would suffer front wing damage on lap 4 after making contact with Max Verstappen, and he had to pit as a result which dropped him to last place. He retired on the closing stages of the race with gearbox issues. Norris meanwhile would have a strong race, finishing P6, earning McLaren's first points of the season.

At the 1000th Formula One Grand Prix race in China, McLaren struggled in qualifying, with both cars getting eliminated in Q2, recording the first time McLaren's cars missed Q3 in the 2019 season. Sainz would start the race in P14 with Norris alongside him in P15. The race was worse for the team, as both cars would collide with Daniil Kvyat at turn 6 on the first lap, which dropped both of them to the last positions. Norris would later retire due to damage from the collision. The team left the Grand Prix with no points.

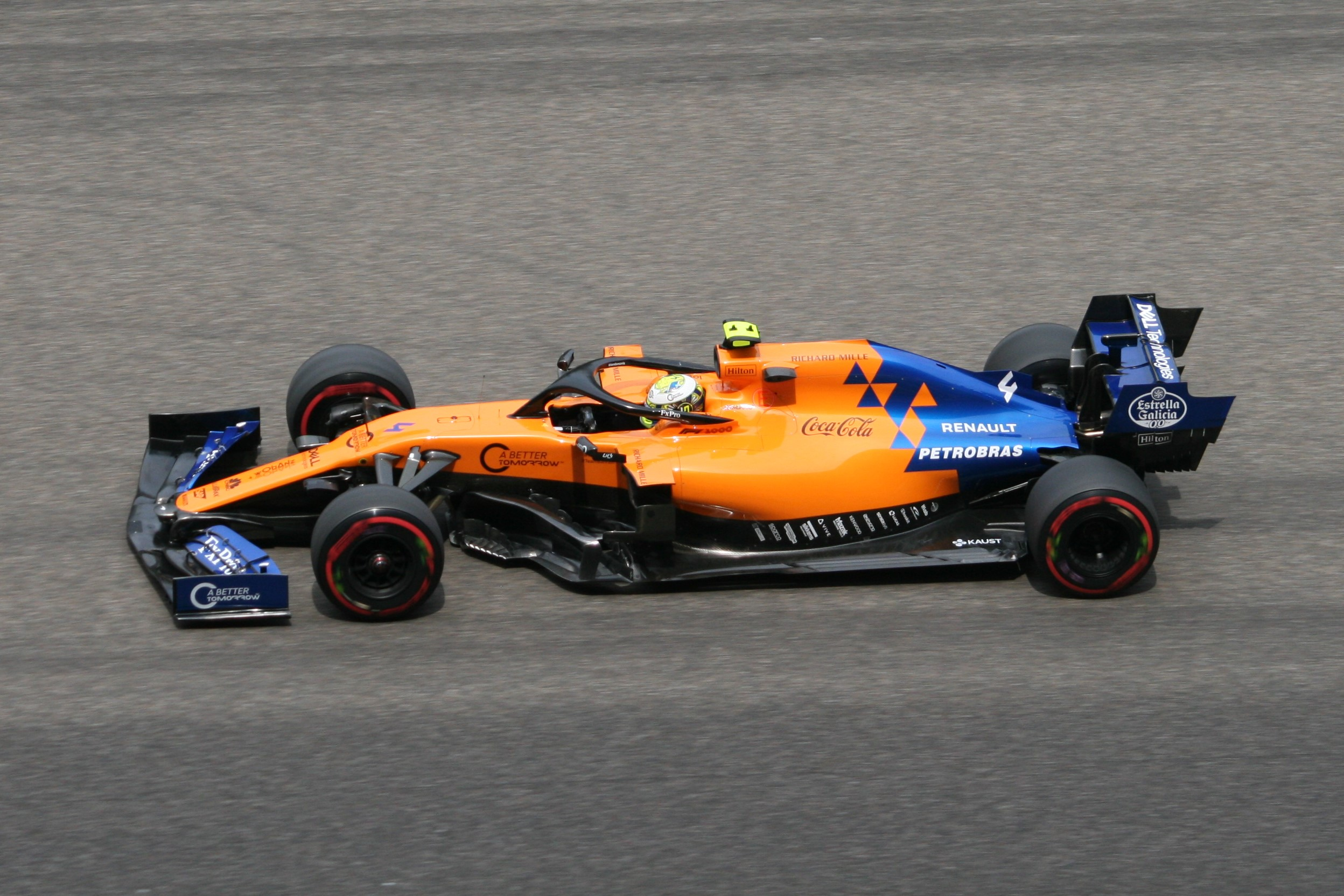
Lando Norris at the Chinese Grand Prix

Norris returned to Q3 in Azerbaijan, qualifying in P7, while Sainz was knocked out again. He would, however, manage to rebound in the race, finishing in 7th after chasing Sergio Pérez for the majority of the race. Norris would follow in P8.

=== European and Canadian rounds ===
McLaren entered Spain with major upgrades to both cars, including revised barge boards, new engine cover, and a reshaped front wing, however both failed to reach Q3. Norris started in P10, and Sainz started in P12, after Daniel Ricciardo received a three-place grid penalty. On lap 44, Norris collided with Lance Stroll with both drivers retiring from the race. Sainz was able to take P8, and with it, put McLaren into 4th position in the Constructors' Championship.

At the Monaco Grand Prix, Sainz qualified in P9, while Norris was out in Q2, down in P12. On race day, Sainz would lose out to Alexander Albon, falling to P10, but he would later execute a strong overtake, passing both Toro Rosso drivers on the outside line in turn 3 for P8. Sainz would continue his strong pace and eventually finish in P6. Norris, however, would have a quiet race in P11.

McLaren had a difficult weekend in Canada. Norris qualified in P8, and Sainz qualified in P9. This became P11, however, as Sainz took a three-place grid penalty for impeding Albon. During the race on Sunday, Sainz had an overheating brake duct due to a visor tearoff getting stuck in the disc. He was immediately told to pit to the hard tyres and to remove the tearoff, impacting his race and strategy. Sainz was in ninth place when he was overtaken by Lance Stroll and Kvyat on the final stages of the race, falling to P11. Norris retired from the race on the early stages of the race, suffering from overheating issues on his rear brakes. McLaren scored no points at the end of the Grand Prix.

At the following round in France, Norris and Sainz had equally strong qualifying sessions, qualifying in P5 and P6 respectively. Sainz's momentum would translate into the race, finishing in P6, only around 33 seconds behind Sebastian Vettel in a frontrunning Ferrari. As for Norris, he had a strong performance, running comfortably in P7 up until the final lap, where he would suffer from hydraulic problems and gradually lose pace. He would then be passed by Daniel Ricciardo before turn 8 to take his position, however for Ricciardo, he ran deep into the corner, and forced Norris off whilst rejoining the circuit in turn 9. The incident allowed Kimi Räikkönen and Nico Hülkenberg past both drivers. On the following straight, Ricciardo went off-track to overtake the Finnish driver for position. He was later handed two five-second penalties after the race for unsafely rejoining the track and gaining an advantage off track. Norris was elevated to P9 after Ricciardo's penalties.

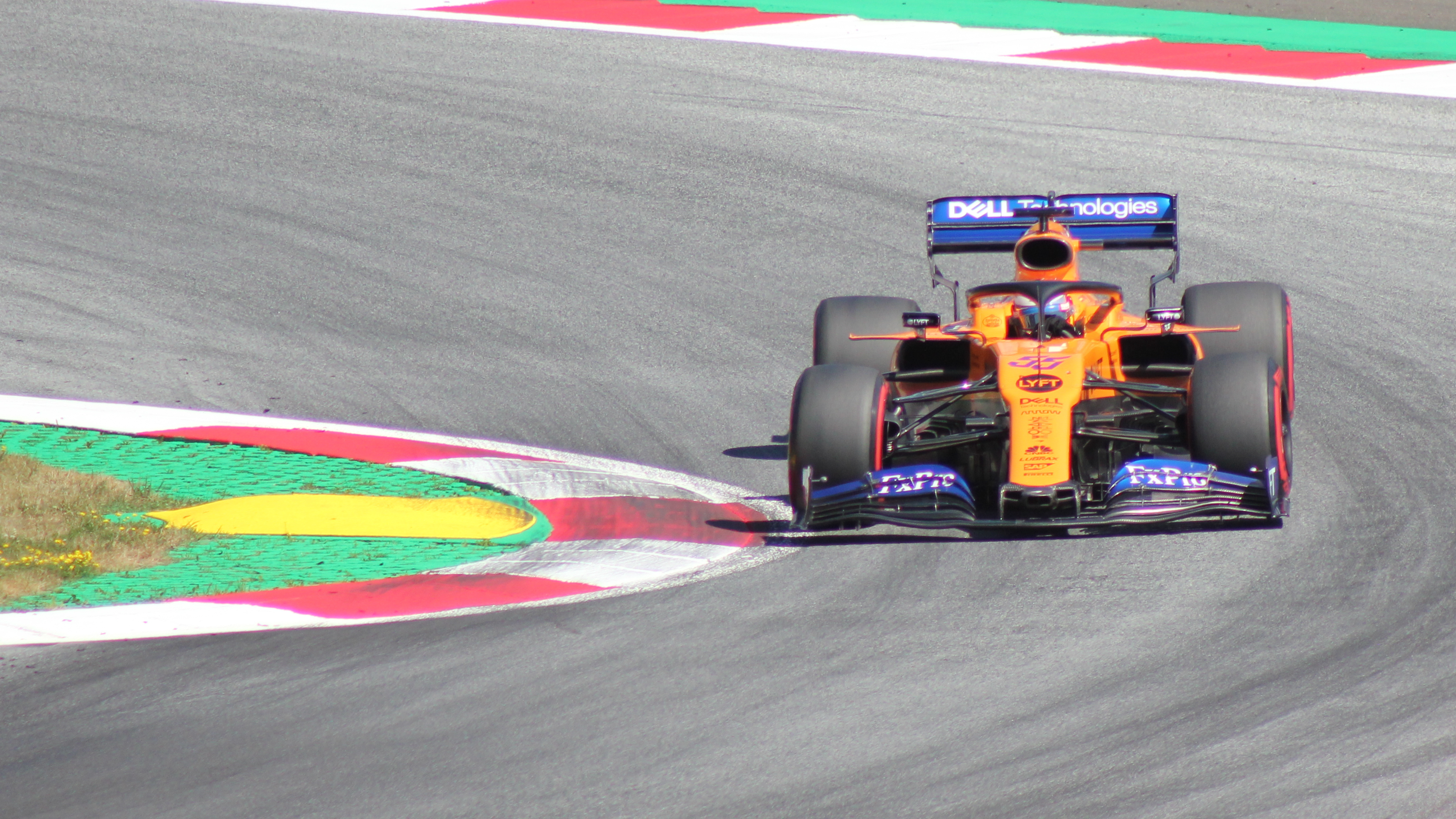
Sainz at the Austrian Grand Prix

At the Austrian Grand Prix, McLaren began the weekend strong, finishing in the top 10 in every practice session. However, in qualifying, despite Norris qualifying in P6, Sainz was forced to start from the last row of the grid as he exceeded his quota for power unit components. In the race, Sainz displayed consistently fast pace and charged towards the front of the field to convert his P19 start into a P8 finish. Norris had a strong start and briefly battled Lewis Hamilton for P3. He ended his race in P6, equalling his best result in Formula One.

Sainz continued his run of successful points finishes in Britain, going on to finish P6, despite qualifying in P13. He would manage to jump both Alfa Romeo cars at the start, and fend off Ricciardo during the race to keep position. Norris struggled during the race and fell to P11 at the finish.

At the following round at the German Grand Prix, heavy amounts of rain riddled with the strategies and caused a chaotic race. Sainz was caught out at turn 16 on lap 18, which caused him to run wide and aquaplane on the slippery drag strip area of the track before narrowly avoiding the barriers. Norris' car suffered a power loss on lap 26, prompting a deployment of the safety car. Many teams took the opportunity to enter the pits for a switch to dry weather tyres, however, Sainz and McLaren had decided otherwise, and instead switched to the intermediate weather tyres. Sainz was able to finish in P5 by the end of the race, his and the team's best result of the season. The result also raised McLaren's points total to 70, surpassing the previous year's total of 62 scored by Fernando Alonso and Stoffel Vandoorne in the MCL33.

McLaren ended the first half of the season on a high in Hungary, with both cars getting into Q3 and scoring much-needed points. Norris and teammate Sainz started in P7 and P8, respectively. At the start, Sainz managed to overtake Gasly and Norris, briefly threatening Sebastian Vettel on the entry of turn 2. Norris managed to finish the race in P9 and Sainz earned his second consecutive P5 finish, earning twelve points for McLaren. McLaren entered the summer break with a comfortable 82 to 43 point advantage over fifth placed Toro Rosso.

After the summer break, at the Belgian Grand Prix, Sainz had a fifteen-place grid penalty for exceeding the quota for power unit components. Immediately after the race started, his car stalled and he retired without crossing the start line. Norris was running fifth when on the penultimate lap, his car lost power. He was classified 11th, outside of the points.

The Italian Grand Prix fared slightly better for McLaren. Sainz managed to get into Q3, one of the only drivers to set a time in that session. Norris would be elimated in Q2, starting 16th after a grid penalty. The race would see Sainz's retirement after an error in fitting his right front tyre. Norris would fight his way through the grid to take 10th place and a solitary point for the team. Meanwhile, their closest rivals Renault caught up to McLaren, after recording a strong fourth and fifth, reducing McLaren's advantage to 18 points.

=== Asian rounds ===
In Singapore, the qualifying session proved to be successful, with both Sainz and Norris making it into Q3, qualifying 7th and 9th respectively. On the opening lap of the race, at turn five Sainz and Nico Hülkenberg collided, puncturing their tyres and as a result, dropping Sainz to the back of the field. He would be called in to pit for the hard compound tyres. The mechanics had trouble with the rear jack, causing Sainz to be stationary in the pits for over 40 seconds, which resulted in him coming out over a lap behind the leaders. Lando Norris benefitted from this and gained two places, elevating him to P7. Sainz could only manage P12 after this, while Norris would finish 7th.

In the Russian Grand Prix, Sainz and Norris had another successful qualifying session, qualifying P6 and P8 respectively. At the start of the race, Sainz overtook frontrunner Valtteri Bottas for fifth at the first corner on the opening lap. He lost that position on lap 7. Norris managed to keep his place to finish in P8 after Haas driver Kevin Magnussen received a penalty, while Sainz finished in P6, which were the exact positions they started the race. The result meant McLaren crossed 100 points in a season for the first time since 2014.

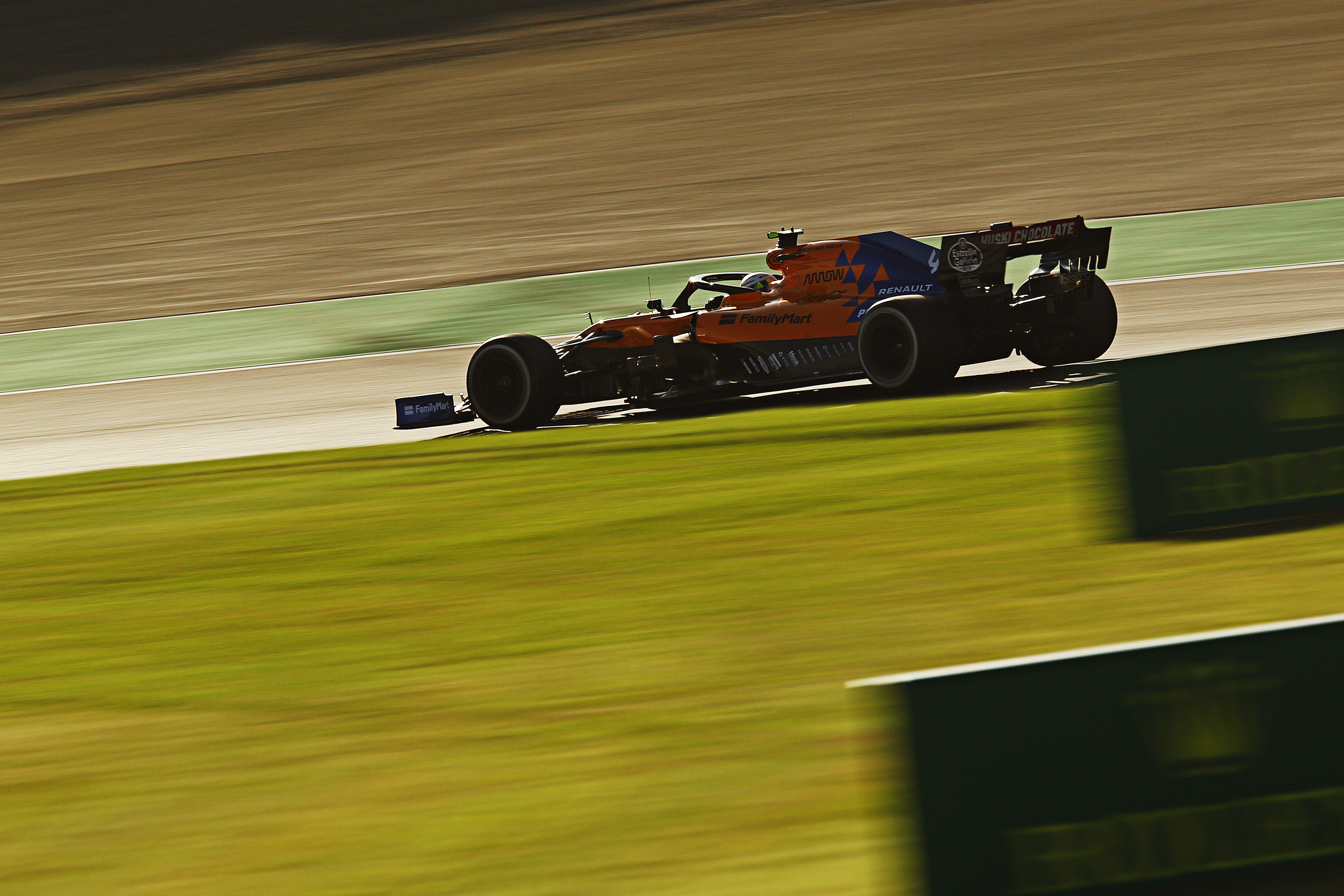
Norris during the Japanese Grand Prix

In Japan, McLaren had both drivers enter Q3 for the third time in a row, Sainz starting in P7 and Norris P8. On lap 4 in the race, Red Bull driver Alexander Albon attempted to overtake Norris at turn 16, causing both to collide, which left Norris with floor damage and therefore impacting the car's pace. Norris also collected debris from Charles Leclerc's earlier crash with Max Verstappen, causing him to pit to avoid a brake fire. He would drop to the back of the field as a result of this. Sainz, who was in 4th place, lost a position on lap 26 in the pits when he emerged behind Albon. In the closing stages of the Grand Prix, Sainz managed to fend off Charles Leclerc and even lap faster than Leclerc. Sainz would go on to finish in P5, the third time he managed to get this result in 2019. Unfortunately, Norris only managed to finish 11th. McLaren extended their advantage over Renault to 38 points. Sainz overtook Toro Rosso driver Pierre Gasly in the driver's championship for P6.

=== Closing rounds ===
After three successful races in a row, the Mexican Grand Prix saw McLaren finish outside of the points. The weekend started well, with the drivers making it into Q3 for the fourth time in a row. The race would also start well, with Norris and Sainz making up a place each after frontrunners Lewis Hamilton and Max Verstappen made contact at turn 2 on the opening lap. Sainz, who was in fourth place, eventually lost a few positions to the frontrunners. On lap 13, Norris, who was in 7th place, pitted, however the mechanics failed to properly attach his front-left wheel. The pit crew managed to push the car back to the pit box before it was too late, however Norris would exit the pits in last place after 2 minutes, a lap down on the leaders. Norris eventually retired after he was in 19th place, 50 seconds behind the car ahead with no chance of scoring points. Sainz dropped down the field and finished a very disappointing P13. He lost P6 in the championship to Gasly.

In the United States Grand Prix, McLaren returned to form as Sainz and Norris qualified P7 and P8. On the opening lap, Sainz and Albon collided into each other, with Sainz losing positions to Norris and Renault driver Daniel Ricciardo. Norris would gain a position after Ferrari driver Sebastian Vettel struggled to warm his tyres. Norris, who was P5, was passed by Ricciardo on lap 8. Albon managed to recover from his earlier incident with Sainz, dropping the McLaren drivers a position each. Norris and Sainz finished 7th and 8th respectively, Norris losing 6th place to Ricciardo by only 4 tenths of a second. Sainz gained a position in the driver's championship after Gasly finished 16th, but he was passed by Albon, meaning he was still P7 in the championship.

The Brazilian Grand Prix would start off as disappointing for McLaren as Sainz encountered engine problems during Q1, while Norris was eliminated in Q2. In the race however, their fortunes would change entirely, as Sainz fought his way through the midfield (including Norris) on a risky one stop strategy. Various frontrunners retired during the race, prompting several safety car periods and bunching up the field. After Ferrari teammates Charles Leclerc and Sebastian Vettel collided, punctured their wheels and retired, Sainz gained two positions and was now in P5. After the safety car ended, Lewis Hamilton crashed with Albon, with Sainz passing Albon for P4 and Norris finishing in P8. After the race, Hamilton was penalized 5 seconds for his earlier incident, elevating Sainz to 3rd place (as he was only 2.257 seconds behind Hamilton). However, Norris did not gain a position from Hamilton as he finished more than five seconds behind the latter. This would be McLaren's first podium since the 2014 Australian Grand Prix. In addition, McLaren secured fourth in the Constructor's championship, 49 points clear of Renault. After Albon finished 14th, both Sainz and Gasly would pass him, and they were both on 95 points. However, Gasly finished 2nd in the race, so Gasly was currently P6 in the championship with Sainz 7th, owing to the rule that the driver who scored the best result in the season would finish higher in the championship if there was a tiebreaker.

In Abu Dhabi, both Sainz and Norris would make it to Q3, starting 7th and 9th respectively. In the race, the order would remain stable in the top 10 for the first few laps. Norris was the first of the drivers to make a scheduled pit stop, on lap 8. On lap 41, Sainz, who was running in P9, came for a second pit stop out of fear that his ageing tyres would allow him to be passed by rivals with fresher tyres. On the penultimate lap, Norris lost 7th place to Sergio Pérez, while on the last lap, Sainz managed to overtake Nico Hulkenberg for 10th, gaining a solitary point. This would prove to be vital, as this meant Sainz would overtake Gasly in the driver's championship, as Gasly finished 18th after a collision with Lance Stroll. Lando Norris finished 11th in the driver's championship as a result of Perez's overtake on him. If he had not been passed by Perez, he would have been 10th in the standings. Sainz's sixth place in the championship would be the first time since 2015 that a non-Mercedes, Ferrari, or Red Bull driver would finish higher than 7th in the standings.

The MCL34 collected 145 points throughout the season, including a podium and three other top 5 finishes. McLaren, who finished fourth in the constructors' championship, scored their best championship position since 2012.

== Sponsorship and livery ==
The MCL34 featured the same iconic papaya orange livery with a blue triangular graphics on the engine cover. Moët & Chandon was dropped and replaced by Estrella Galicia, Sainz' personal sponsor. Soft drink brand Coca-Cola returned for the second year with the team. As the season progressed, numerous sponsors were included such as 7-Eleven and FamilyMart.

In Monaco, the team paid tribute to Niki Lauda with the airbox bearing the year that he claimed his third World Drivers' Championship with the team — 1984. In Belgium, the team paid tribute to Anthoine Hubert, his name was also borne on the airbox.

== Complete Formula One results ==
(key)

Year	Entrant	Engine	Tyres	Drivers	Grands Prix																					Points	WCC
Year	Entrant	Engine	Tyres	Drivers	AUS	BHR	CHN	AZE	ESP	MON	CAN	FRA	AUT	GBR	GER	HUN	BEL	ITA	SIN	RUS	JPN	MEX	USA	BRA	ABU	Points	WCC
2019	McLaren F1 Team	Renault; E-Tech 19	P	Lando Norris	12	6	18^{†}	8	Ret	11	Ret	9	6	11	Ret	9	11^{†}	10	7	8	11	Ret	7	8	8	145	4th
2019	McLaren F1 Team	Renault; E-Tech 19	P	Carlos Sainz Jr.	Ret	19^{†}	14	7	8	6	11	6	8	6	5	5	Ret	Ret	12	6	5	13	8	3	10	145	4th

^{†} Driver failed to finish the race, but was classified as they had completed over 90% of the winner's race distance.
