= Stefano Sordo =

Italian engineer

- Born: 12 March 1972 (age 54)
- Occupation: Engineer
- Employer: Audi Revolut F1 Team
- Title: Performance director

Stefano Sordo (born 12 March 1972) is an Italian Formula One engineer. He is the performance director at the Audi Revolut F1 Team.

== Career ==
Sordo started his career in motorsport as a Data Engineer for Tatuus in 1996, followed by a move to DC Cook Racing in the British Formula 3 International Series, progressing from data engineering into a race engineering role by 1997.

Sordo then joined West Competition, the McLaren junior team, as a Race Engineer within the team's Formula 3000 programme. He then took the step up to Formula One, serving as a race engineer for Enrique Bernoldi at Arrows for 2001 and 2002. After the team folded, he joined Jaguar Racing engineering Antonio Pizzonia in 2003 and Christian Klein in 2004. He remained with the team as it transitioned into Red Bull Racing working with David Coulthard in his first season with the team. The following season Sordo then moved to the sister team Scuderia Toro Rosso in its inaugural season to work with Vitantonio Liuzzi.

In 2007, Sordo transitioned into aerodynamic performance, returning to Red Bull as Aero Performance Team Leader. He contributed to trackside performance analysis and aerodynamic correlation during the team's rise to multiple World Championship titles. He was promoted to Head of Aero Performance in 2014, remaining in the role until 2016.

Sordo joined McLaren Racing later in 2016 as Head of Vehicle Performance, overseeing performance analysis, correlation, and development direction across car programmes. He was promoted to Director of Vehicle Performance in 2021, taking responsibility for the broader performance department during a period of significant regulation change.

In October 2022, Sordo moved to the United States to become technical director at Rahal Letterman Lanigan Racing, working on the team's IndyCar Series programme. After two seasons in the category, he returned to Formula One in 2024 as Performance Director of the Sauber F1 Team, leading performance-focused engineering activities ahead of the team's transitional period towards Audi's 2026 entry.
