= Akebono Brake Industry =

Japanese company

Akebono Brake Industry Co., Ltd.
- Native name: 曙ブレーキ工業
- Type: Public
- Traded as: TYO: 7238
- ISIN: JP3108400007
- Industry: Automotive
- Founded: 27 January 1929; 97 years ago
- Founder: Sanji Osame
- Headquarters: Nihonbashi, Chuo-ku, Tokyo (Tokyo headquarters); Hanyu City, Saitama (Ai-City headquarters)
- Area served: Worldwide
- Key people: Yasuhiro Miyaji (chairman, president and CEO)
- Products: Brakes for vehicles, motorcycles, trains, industrial machinery
- Revenue: ▲JPY 281.3 billion (FY 2015) (US$ 2.44 billion) (FY 2015)
- Number of employees: 9,238 (consolidated, as of March 2016)
- Website: Official website

Akebono Brake Industry Co., Ltd. (曙ブレーキ工業, Akebono Burēki Kōgyō) is a Japanese manufacturer of brake components for automobiles, motorcycles, trains, and industrial machinery.

The company was founded by Sanji Osame in 1929 as Akebono Sekimen Kogyosho as a response to the demand by the Japan Army Authority for ground transport; Its first products were brake linings used by the government entity. Today it is a large company with a significant overseas presence and wide range of brake products for many applications.

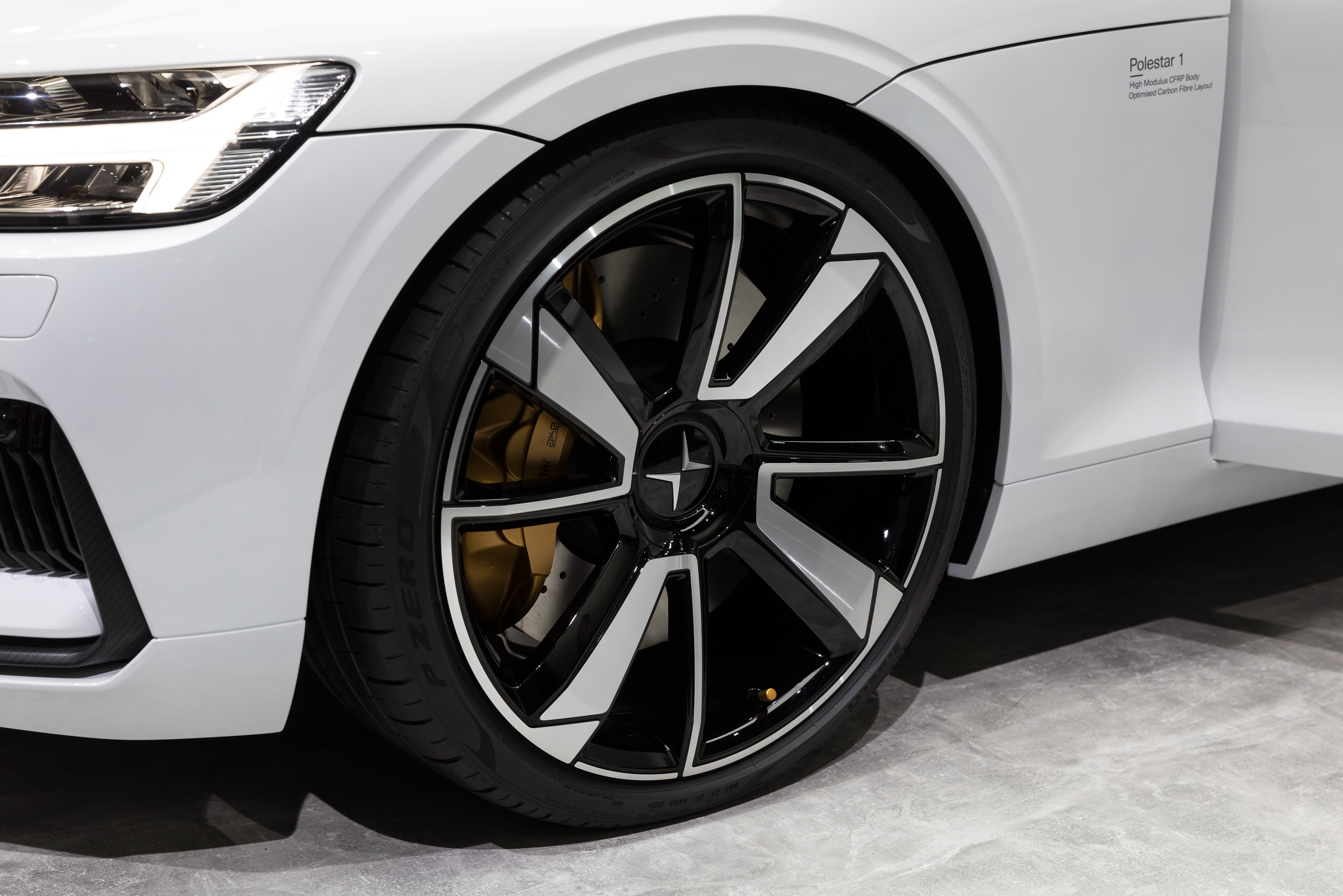
Polestar 1 with Akebono brakes

== Business locations ==
In addition to its headquarters in Hanyū; and Nihonbashi, it also has facilities in other locations in Japan, such as Fukushima.

In the United States, it has facilities in Elizabethtown, Kentucky; Farmington Hills, Michigan; and Glasgow, Kentucky.

In Mexico, it has a factory in Silao, Guanajuato.

In China, it has plants in Guangzhou and Suzhou. In Indonesia and Vietnam, it has a partnership with Astra.

In Europe, it has facilities in Arras and Gonesse in France, and also has a UK presence for its work with the McLaren Formula 1 team. Its main European facility in Trenčín is focused on production of high-performance aluminium brake calipers.

== Automotive brakes ==
Akebono offers products mainly on an OEM basis for automobile manufacturers. Its main OEM customers include Japanese car manufacturers such as Toyota, Nissan, Honda, Mitsubishi, Subaru, and Isuzu. The company also supplies products to global automakers like Porsche, Audi, Bentley, GM, Ford, Mercedes-Benz, and Polestar.

== Motorsport ==
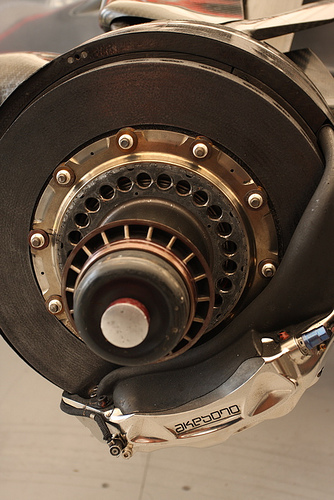
A McLaren MP4-22 Formula 1 brake manufactured by Akebono

Beginning with the 2007 Formula One season, Akebono has been a technology partner to the McLaren F1 team by supplying brake calipers and pads until 2021 season. Since 2013, Akebono has also supplied brake components to the Toyota WEC team.
