= James Key (Formula One) =

British engineer (born 1972)

- Born: 14 January 1972 (age 54); Chelmsford, Essex, England
- Citizenship: British
- Education: University of Nottingham (BEng)
- Occupation: Formula One engineer
- Years active: 1998–present
- Employer: Audi F1 Team
- Known for: Formula One engineer
- Title: Technical Director
- Predecessor: Jan Monchaux

James Key (born 14 January 1972) is a British Formula One engineer who currently serves as the technical director of the Audi Formula One team since 2026.

== Early life and education ==
Key was born in Chelmsford, Essex, on 14 January 1972. Key studied Mechanical Engineering at the University of Nottingham. Lotus Engineering sponsored him to his degree in 1996.

== Formula One career ==
Key joined Jordan Grand Prix in 1998, spending several years as a data engineer, then became race engineer for Takuma Sato. Following a year working in the wind tunnel, he transferred to the vehicle dynamics department, eventually becoming the department head during the team's final few seasons as Jordan Grand Prix. Shortly after the team's ownership transferred to MF1 Racing, he became Technical Director during the 2005 Formula One season following a brief period as Technical Co-ordinator. He was one of the youngest Technical Directors of a Formula One team, at the age of 33 years, along with Sam Michael (born in 1971) who became the technical director of Williams at the age of 33 during the 2004 season. Key retained his position during the team's transition through Spyker F1 to Force India. In April 2010, he left Force India to join Sauber, replacing Willy Rampf as Technical Director.

Key remained at Force India for almost two years, before leaving in February 2012 to accept an undisclosed offer with one of the British-based teams. On 6 September 2012, it was announced that Key had joined Scuderia Toro Rosso as Technical Director, replacing Giorgio Ascanelli. In 2016, Key was linked to Ferrari due the Toro Rosso STR11 containing several interesting aerodynamic solutions that attracted the attention of the then Ferrari Team Principal Maurizio Arrivabene. On 26 July 2018, McLaren confirmed that Key, who ultimately remained at Toro Rosso, had agreed to become technical director of the team, replacing the ousted Tim Goss. On 22 February 2019, it was announced that Key would join McLaren from 25 March 2019, just after the Australian Grand Prix. He formed a triumvirate with Andrea Stella as Racing Director and Piers Thynne as Production Director, all under Team Principal Andreas Seidl. Key was sacked by McLaren on 23 March 2023 in an organisational change of the team's executive technical director role, replaced by David Sanchez following team dissatisfaction with the initial design and early season performance of their 2023 challenger, the MCL60.

On 7 June 2023, Alfa Romeo announced that Key would join the team on 1 September 2023. He took on the role of Technical Director again, replacing the ousted Jan Monchaux. He previously held the position of Technical Director under this team under its former name of Sauber in 2013, ahead of their re-branding as the Audi works team in 2026. He once again worked under Seidl, CEO of Sauber Group, who had served as Team Principal during the pair's time at McLaren. Seidl was later replaced at Sauber Group by Mattia Binotto.
