= Piers Thynne =

British engineer

- Occupation: Engineer
- Employer: Williams F1 Team
- Known for: Formula One engineer
- Title: Chief Optimisation and Planning Officer

Piers Thynne is a British Formula One and motorsports engineer. He is currently the Chief Optimisation and Planning Officer for the Williams Formula One team.

== Career ==
Thynne began his career in motorsport with Ascari Cars and held a senior project-management role at Xtrac, developing experience in transmission programmes and high-performance manufacturing. Thynne then joined McLaren Racing in 2008 initially working in programme management, becoming Gearbox Programme Manager before being promoted to Head of Programme Management in 2012. He later served as Head of Programme and Operational Logistics from 2017 to 2019, coordinating car build, supply-chain integration, and race logistics. In July 2019 he was appointed Production Director, and subsequently Operations Director in 2021, with responsibility for the factory's operational strategy, including project management, quality, manufacturing, build, test, logistics, and transport functions.

Thynne became Chief Operating Officer in March 2023; in this role he supported Team Principal Andrea Stella in overseeing the organisation's operational and manufacturing functions, driving performance, innovation, and efficiency across all areas of the Formula One team. He has played a key role in McLaren's return to the front of the grid, contributing to the team securing the Constructors’ Championships in 2024 and 2025.

In May 2026, Thynne left McLaren and joined Williams in the role of Chief Optimisation and Planning Officer.

== Personal life ==
Thynne lives in North Hampshire spends time hillclimbing and sprinting and has competed in a number of vehicles and venues and has been often found at Gurston Down near Salisbury competing in various cars over the years
