= 2024 Formula One World Championship =

75th Formula One season

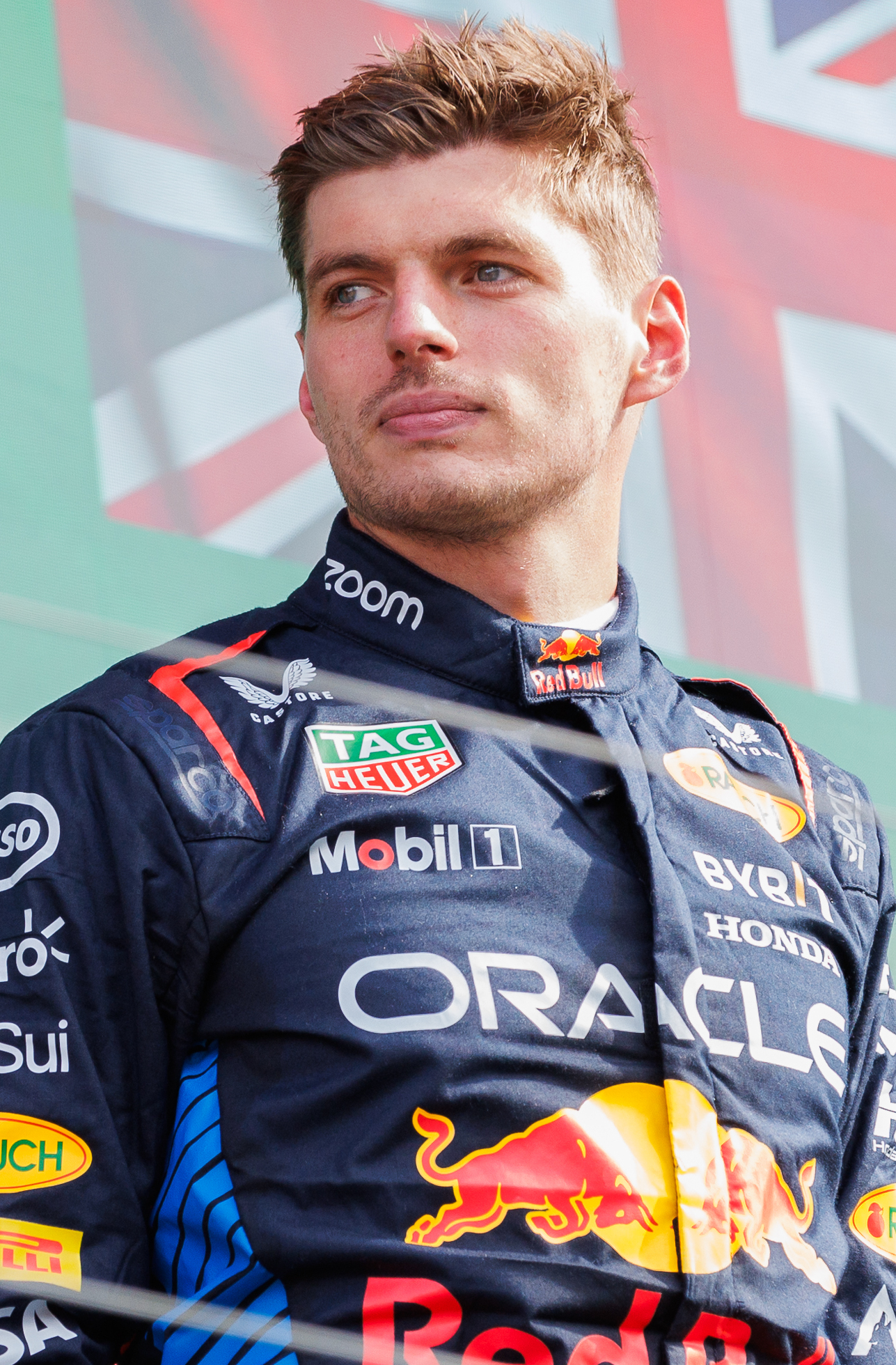
Max Verstappen won his fourth consecutive World Drivers' Championship, driving for Red Bull Racing.

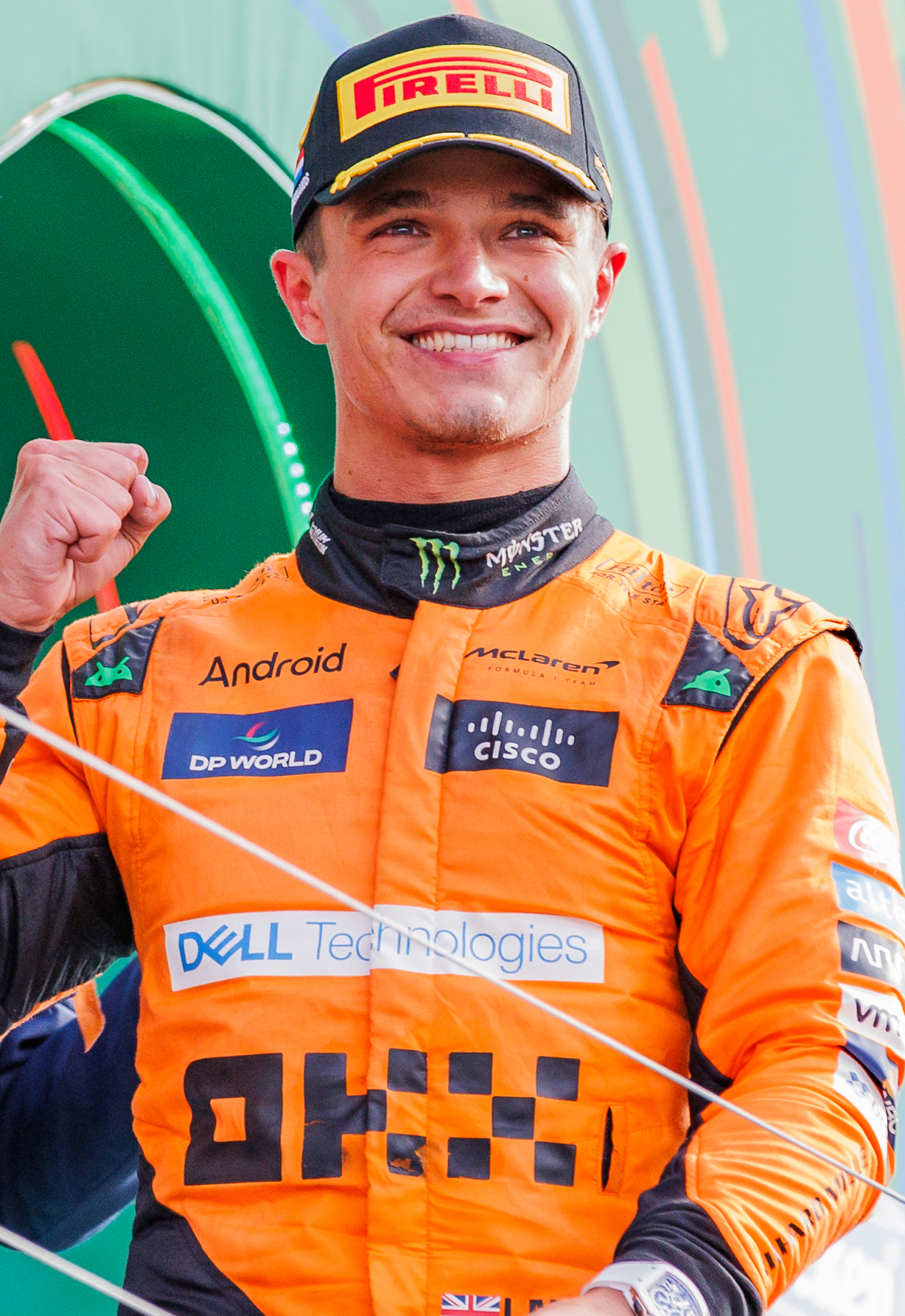
Lando Norris finished runner-up, driving for McLaren.

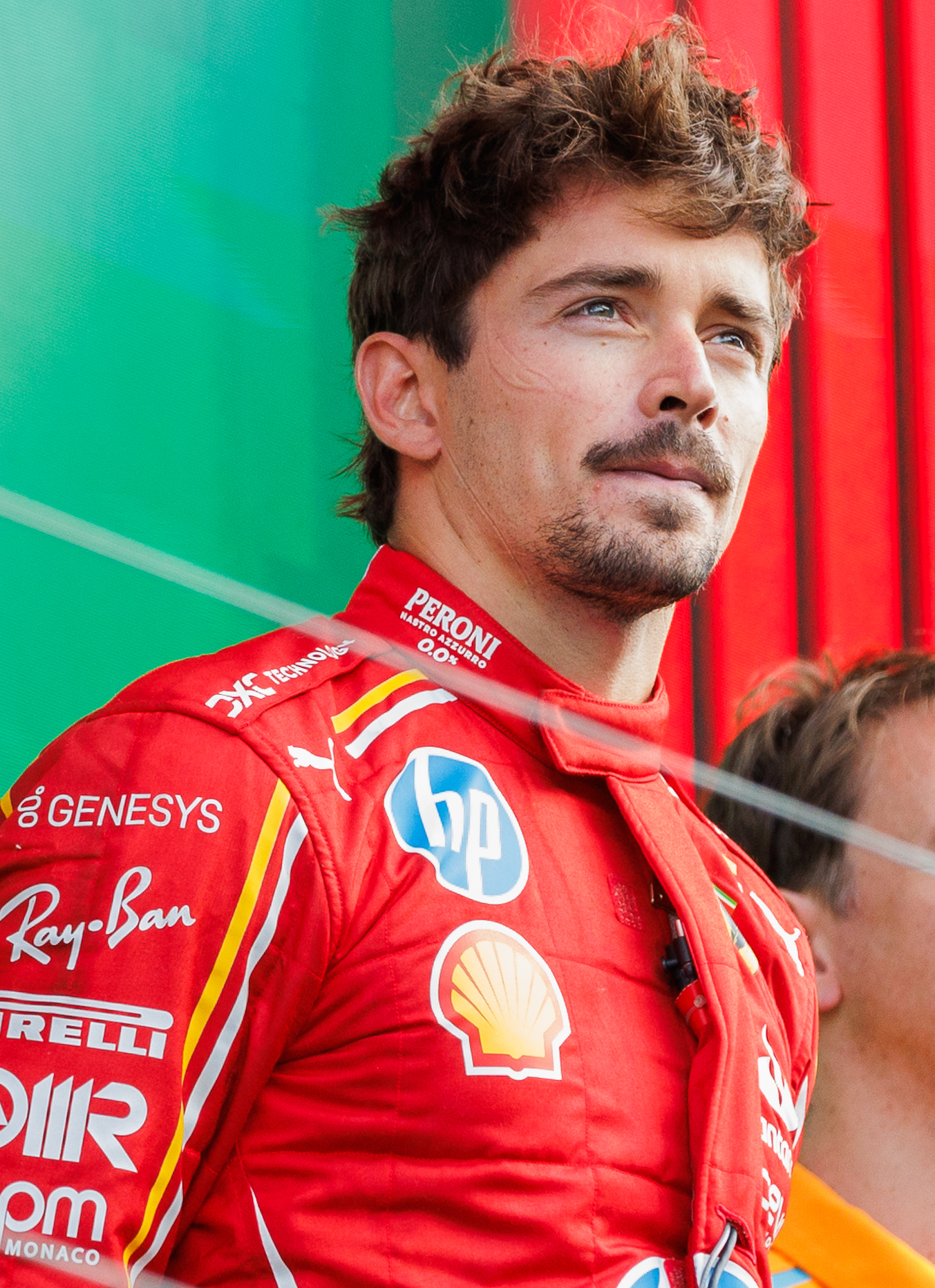
Charles Leclerc finished third, driving for Ferrari.

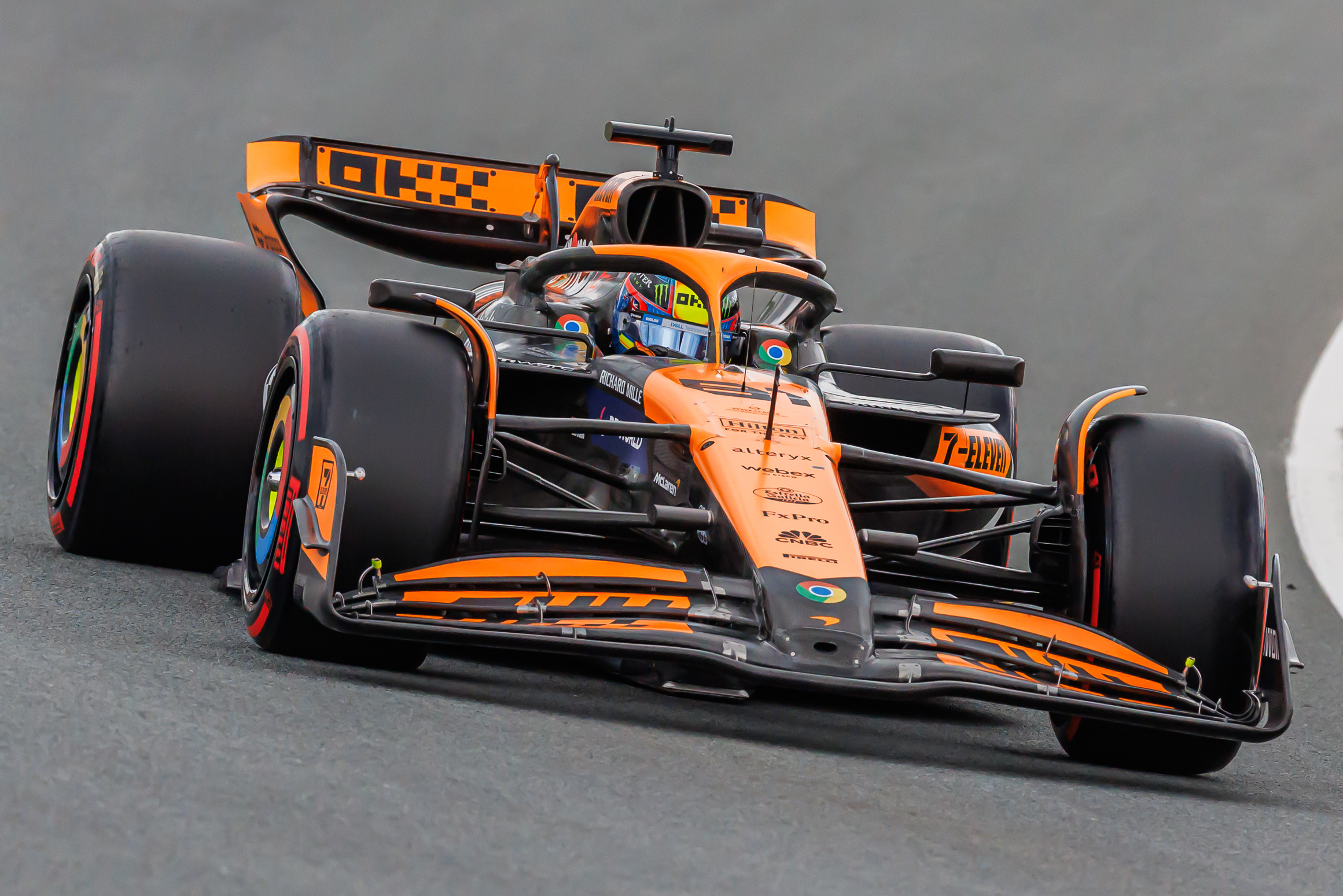
McLaren-Mercedes won their ninth World Constructors' Championship, and their first since 1998.

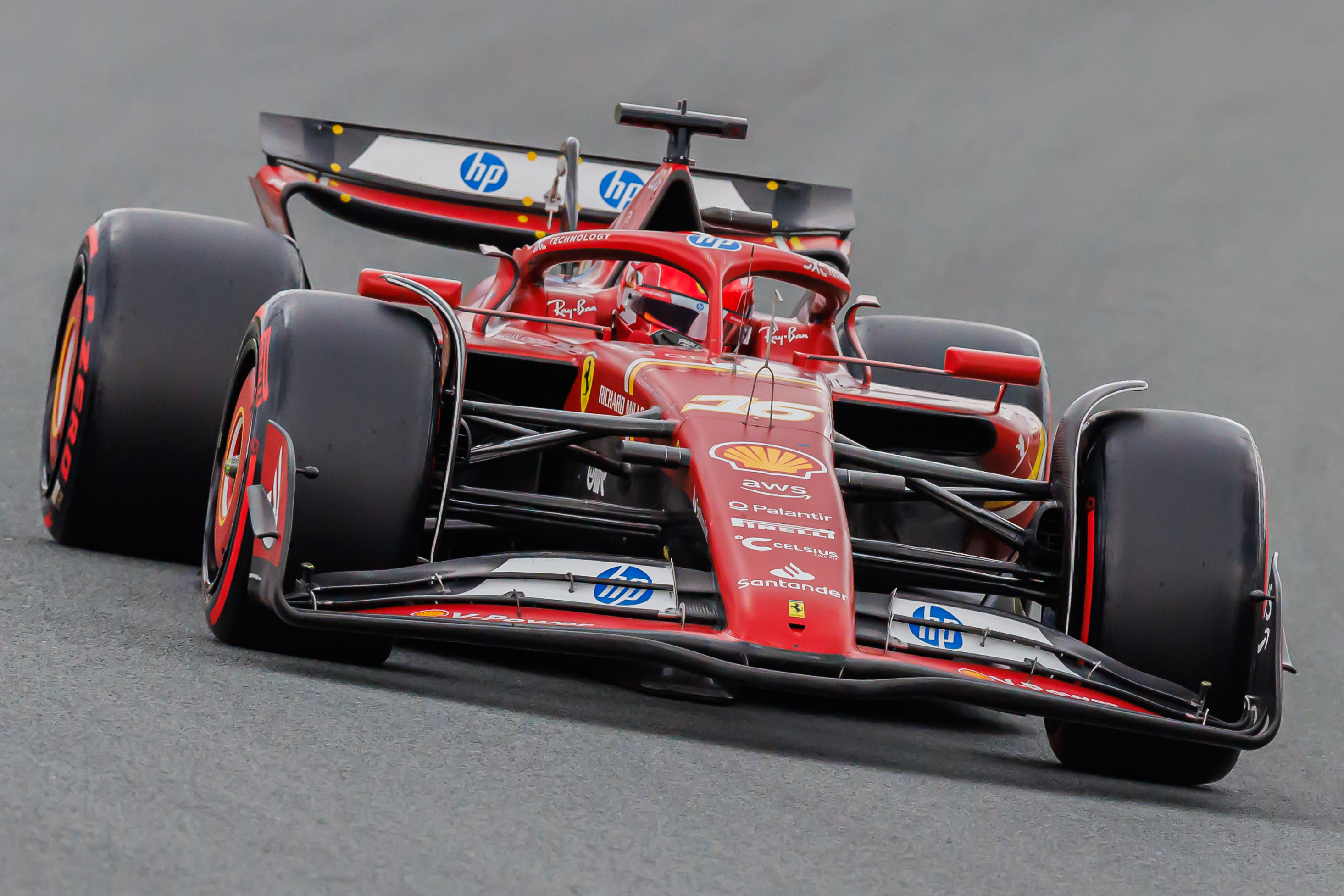
Ferrari finished second in the World Constructors' Championship.

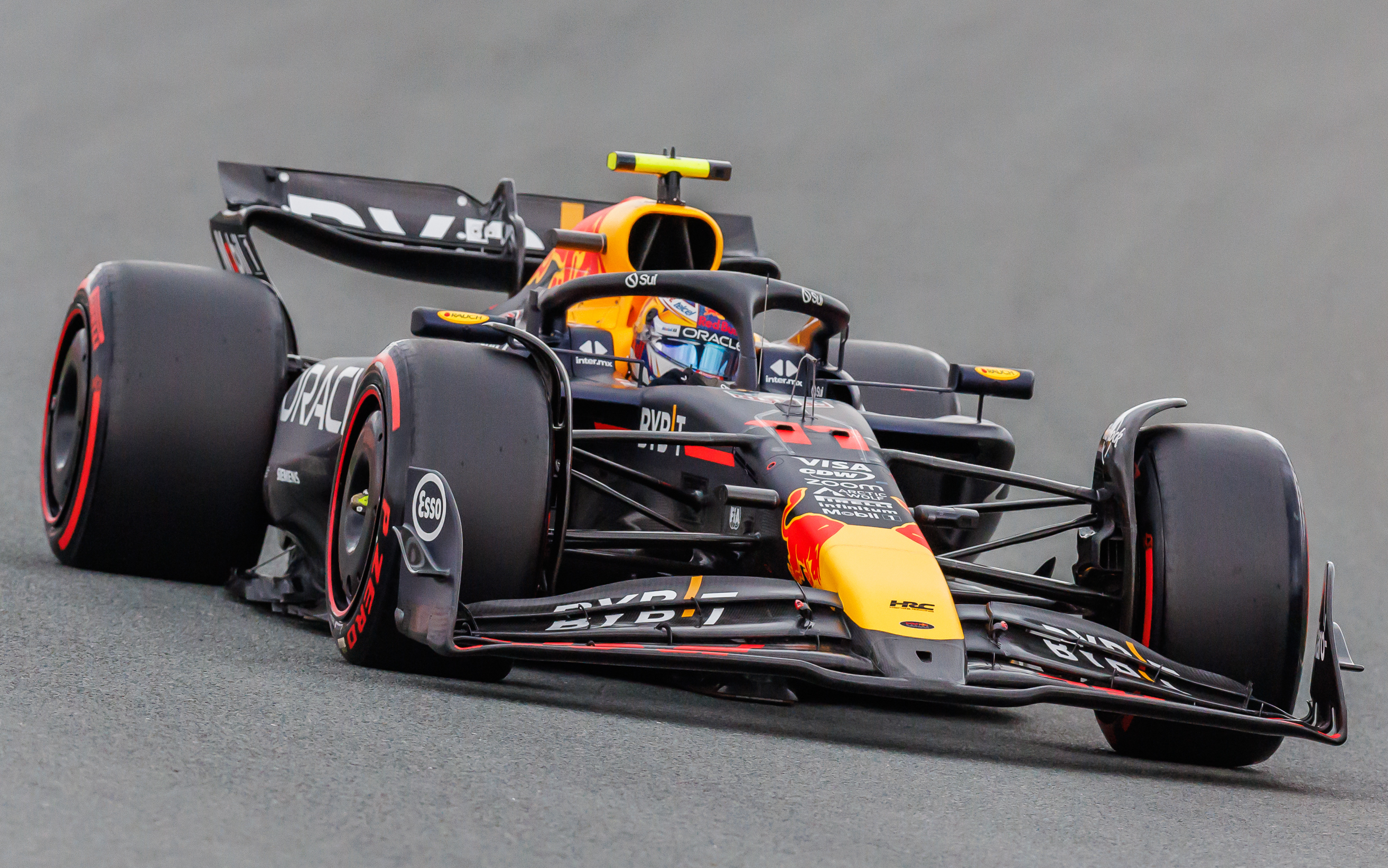
Red Bull Racing-Honda RBPT, the defending Constructors' Champions, finished third.

The 2024 FIA Formula One World Championship was a motor racing championship for Formula One cars and was the 75th running of the Formula One World Championship. It was recognised by the Fédération Internationale de l'Automobile (FIA), the governing body of international motorsport, as the highest class of competition for open-wheel racing cars. The championship was contested over a record twenty-four Grands Prix held around the world.

Drivers and teams competed for the titles of World Drivers' Champion and World Constructors' Champion respectively. Defending world drivers’ champion Max Verstappen of Red Bull Racing dominated the opening 10 races with seven wins; however, the season as a whole was highly competitive, with a record-breaking six other drivers claiming multiple Grand Prix victories. McLaren driver Lando Norris emerged as Verstappen's closest competitor, as the MCL38 began to consistently outperform the RB20, Verstappen outscored Norris by 69 points across the opening 10 rounds, across the final 14 Norris would outscore Verstappen, with Verstappen failing to win from rounds 11 to 20. Verstappen maintained his points advantage to win his fourth consecutive Drivers' Championship title at the Las Vegas Grand Prix. Verstappen's title made him the third drivers' champion after Keke Rosberg in 1982 and Nelson Piquet in 1983 to win the drivers' championship with a team that finished 3rd or lower in the constructors' championship. McLaren surpassed Red Bull and went on to achieve their ninth Constructors' Championship title at the Abu Dhabi Grand Prix, narrowly ahead of Ferrari by just 14 points. With their first Constructors' Championship victory in 26 years, McLaren became the first constructor other than Red Bull and Mercedes to win the title since Brawn in 2009.

== Entries ==
All teams competed with tyres supplied by Pirelli. Each team was required to enter at least two drivers, one for each of the two mandatory cars.

Teams and drivers that competed in the 2024 World Championship
Entrant	Constructor	Chassis	Power unit	Race drivers		
Entrant	Constructor	Chassis	Power unit	No.	Driver name	Rounds
(France) BWT Alpine F1 Team	Alpine-Renault	A524	Renault E-Tech RE24	10; 31; 61	(France) Pierre Gasly (France) Esteban Ocon (Australia) Jack Doohan	All; 1–23; 24
(United Kingdom) Aston Martin Aramco F1 Team	Aston Martin Aramco-Mercedes	AMR24	Mercedes-AMG F1 M15	14; 18	(Spain) Fernando Alonso (Canada) Lance Stroll	All; All
(Italy) Scuderia Ferrari	Ferrari	SF-24	Ferrari 066/12	16; 55; 38	(Monaco) Charles Leclerc (Spain) Carlos Sainz Jr. (Great Britain) Oliver Bearman	All; All (Note: Carlos Sainz Jr. was entered into the Saudi Arabian Grand Prix, but later withdrew after being diagnosed with appendicitis.); 2
(United States) MoneyGram Haas F1 Team	Haas-Ferrari	VF-24	Ferrari 066/10	20; 50; 27	(Denmark) Kevin Magnussen (United Kingdom) Oliver Bearman (Germany) Nico Hülkenberg	1–16, 18–24 (Note: Kevin Magnussen was entered into the São Paulo Grand Prix, but later withdrew due to illness.); 17, 21; All
(Switzerland) Stake F1 Team Kick Sauber (Note: Sauber's sponsorship arrangement was with Stake, whose co-founders are backers of Kick. Sauber entered rounds 3, 10, 14, and 23–24 as "Kick Sauber F1 Team".)	Kick Sauber-Ferrari	C44	Ferrari 066/12	24; 77	(China) Zhou Guanyu (Finland) Valtteri Bottas	All; All
(United Kingdom) McLaren Formula 1 Team	McLaren-Mercedes	MCL38	Mercedes-AMG F1 M15	4; 81	(Great Britain) Lando Norris (Australia) Oscar Piastri	All; All
(Germany) Mercedes-AMG Petronas F1 Team	Mercedes	F1 W15	Mercedes-AMG F1 M15	44; 63	(Great Britain) Lewis Hamilton (Great Britain) George Russell	All; All
(Italy) Visa Cash App RB F1 Team	RB-Honda RBPT	VCARB 01	Honda RBPTH002	3; 30; 22	(Australia) Daniel Ricciardo (New Zealand) Liam Lawson (Japan) Yuki Tsunoda	1–18; 19–24; All
(Austria) Oracle Red Bull Racing	Red Bull Racing-Honda RBPT	RB20	Honda RBPTH002	1; 11	(Netherlands) Max Verstappen (Mexico) Sergio Pérez	All; All
(United Kingdom) Williams Racing	Williams-Mercedes	FW46	Mercedes-AMG F1 M15	2; 43; 23	(United States) Logan Sargeant (Argentina) Franco Colapinto (Thailand) Alexander Albon	1–15 (Note: Logan Sargeant was entered into the Australian Grand Prix, but later withdrew to allow his car to be driven by teammate Alexander Albon as the latter's car was seriously damaged following a crash.); 16–24; All

=== Free practice drivers ===
Throughout the season, each team had to field a driver in one of the first two free practice sessions who had not competed in more than two races, on two occasions, once for each car. Oliver Bearman's debut for Ferrari at the Saudi Arabian Grand Prix did not count, as he only participated in the third practice session. His second race appearance for Haas, however, did count.

Drivers that took part in first or second free practice sessions
Constructor	Practice drivers		
Constructor	No.	Driver name	Rounds
Alpine-Renault	61	(Australia) Jack Doohan	9, 12
Aston Martin Aramco-Mercedes	34	(Brazil) Felipe Drugovich	20, 24
Ferrari	38; 39	(United Kingdom) Oliver Bearman (Monaco) Arthur Leclerc	20; 24
Haas-Ferrari	50	(United Kingdom) Oliver Bearman	7, 10, 12–13
Kick Sauber-Ferrari	97	(Israel) Robert Shwartzman	15, 20
McLaren-Mercedes	29; 28	(Mexico) Patricio O'Ward (Japan) Ryō Hirakawa	20; 24
Mercedes	12	(Italy) Andrea Kimi Antonelli	16, 20
RB-Honda RBPT	40	(Japan) Ayumu Iwasa	4, 24
Red Bull Racing-Honda RBPT	37	(France) Isack Hadjar	12, 24
Williams-Mercedes	45; 46	(Argentina) Franco Colapinto (United Kingdom) Luke Browning	12; 24

=== Team changes ===
Alfa Romeo ended their partnership with Sauber and left Formula One following the conclusion of the 2023 season as Sauber prepared to become the Audi works team from 2026. The team was rebranded as Stake F1 Team Kick Sauber, competing with the constructor name Kick Sauber. AlphaTauri rebranded as RB and relocated the aerodynamics operations of the team to Milton Keynes in the United Kingdom amidst a management restructure.

=== Driver changes ===
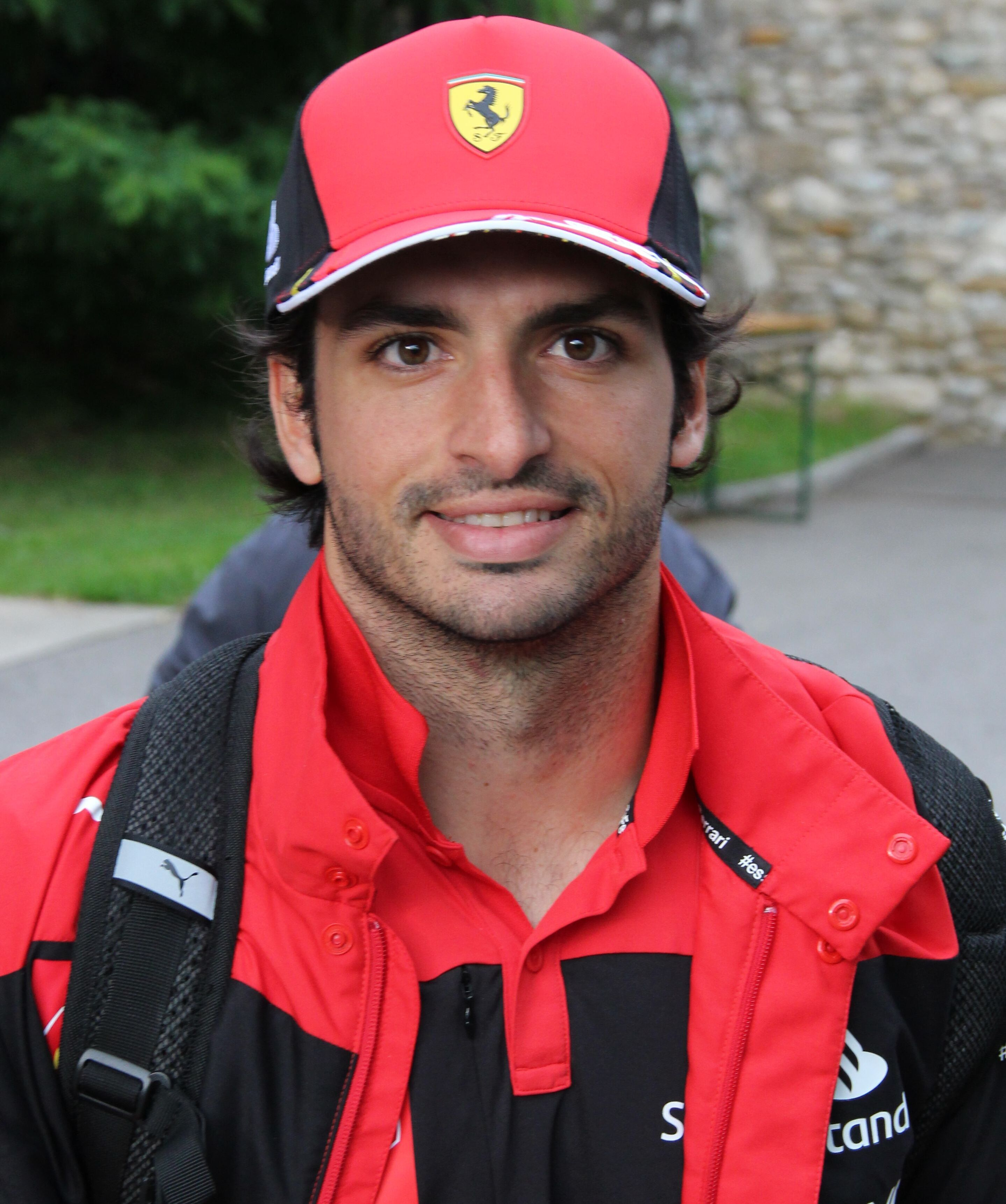
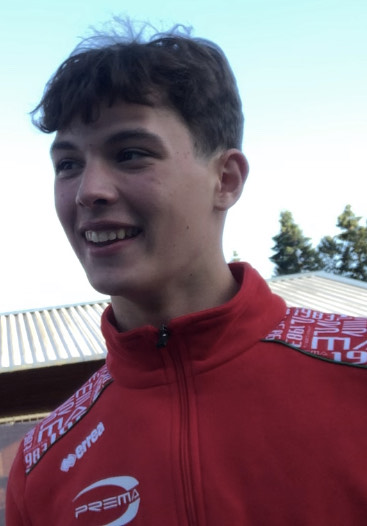
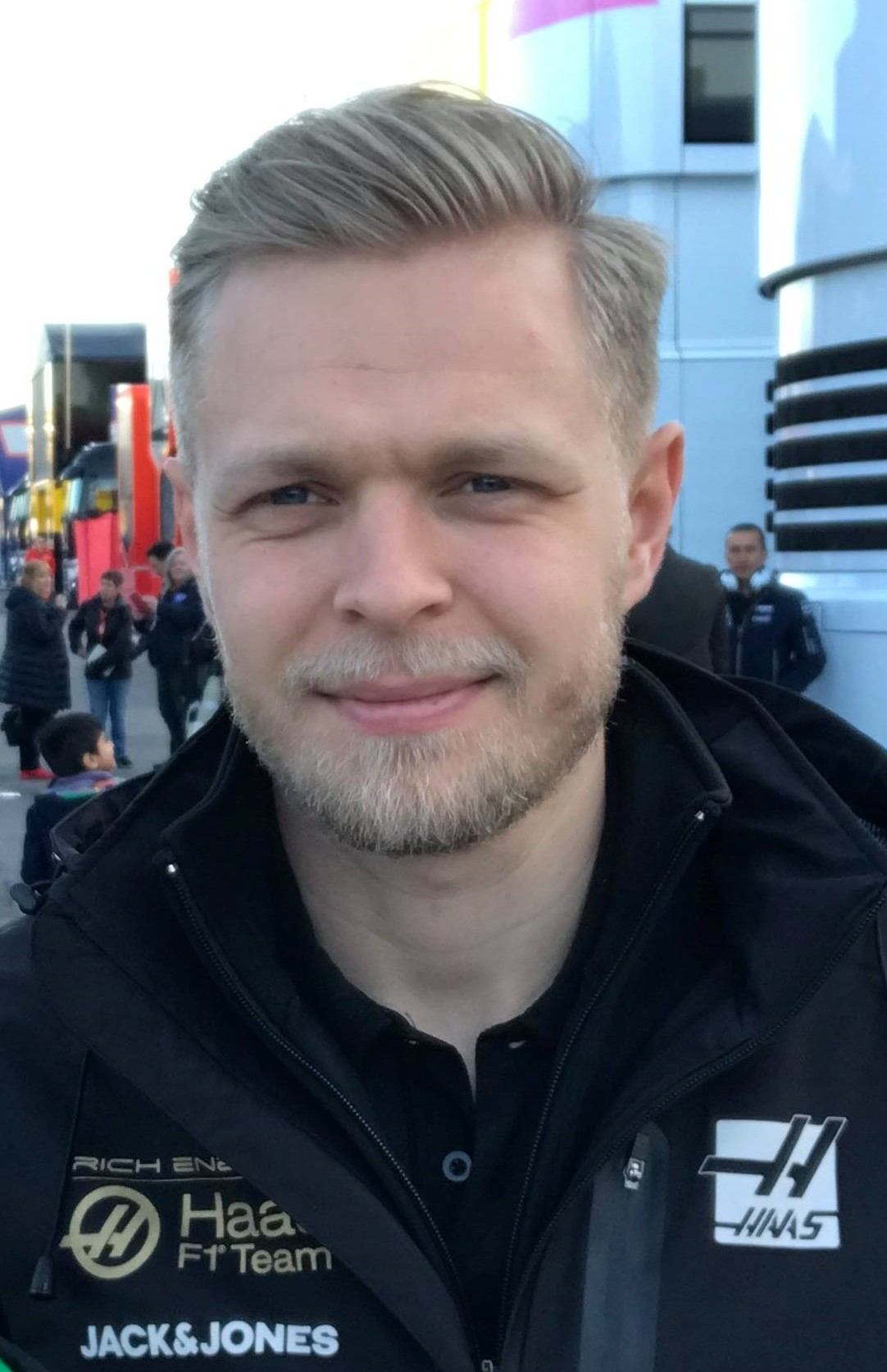
Oliver Bearman (centre) stood in for Carlos Sainz Jr. (left) at Ferrari at the Saudi Arabian Grand Prix and for Kevin Magnussen (right) at Haas at the Azerbaijan and São Paulo Grands Prix.
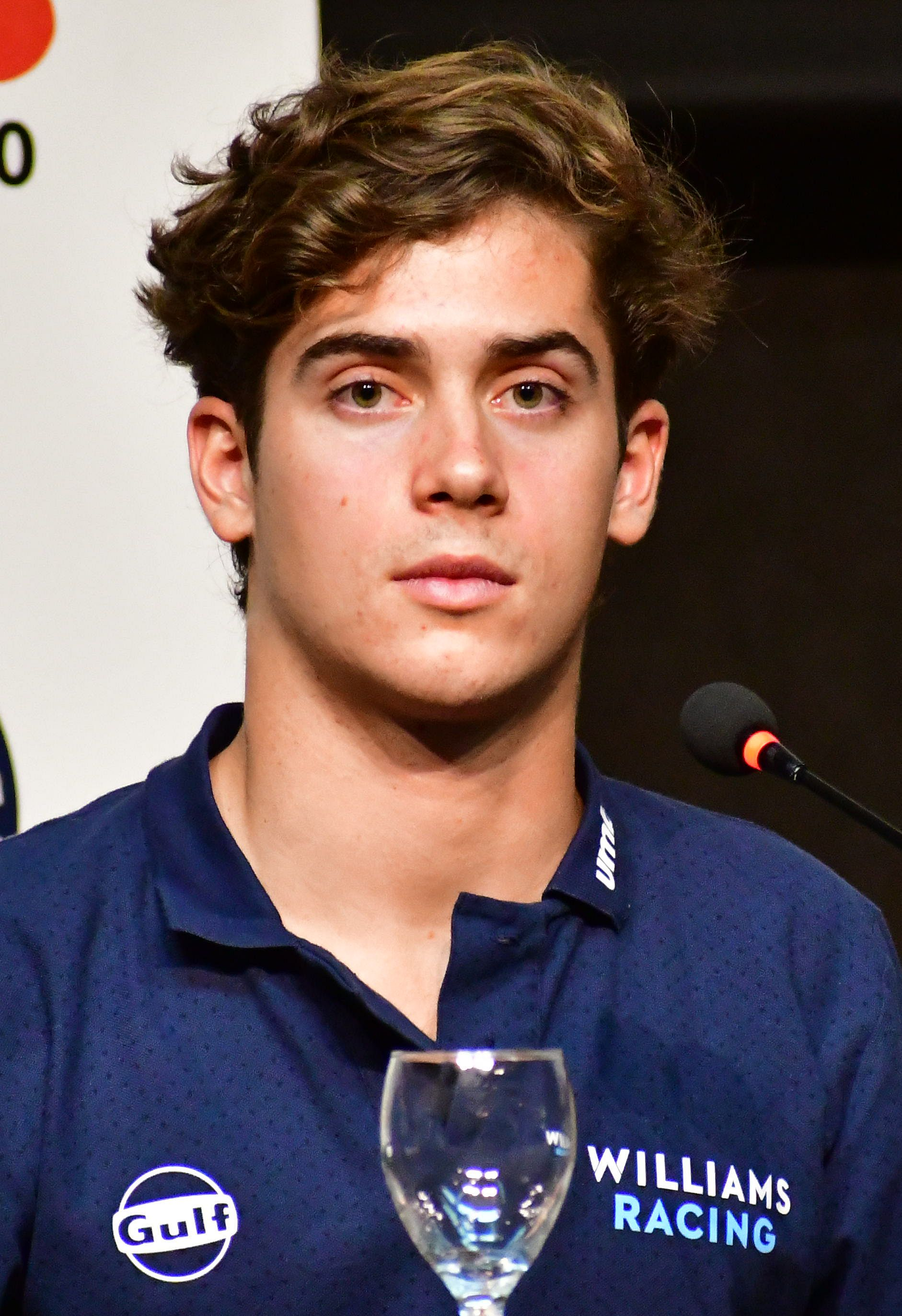
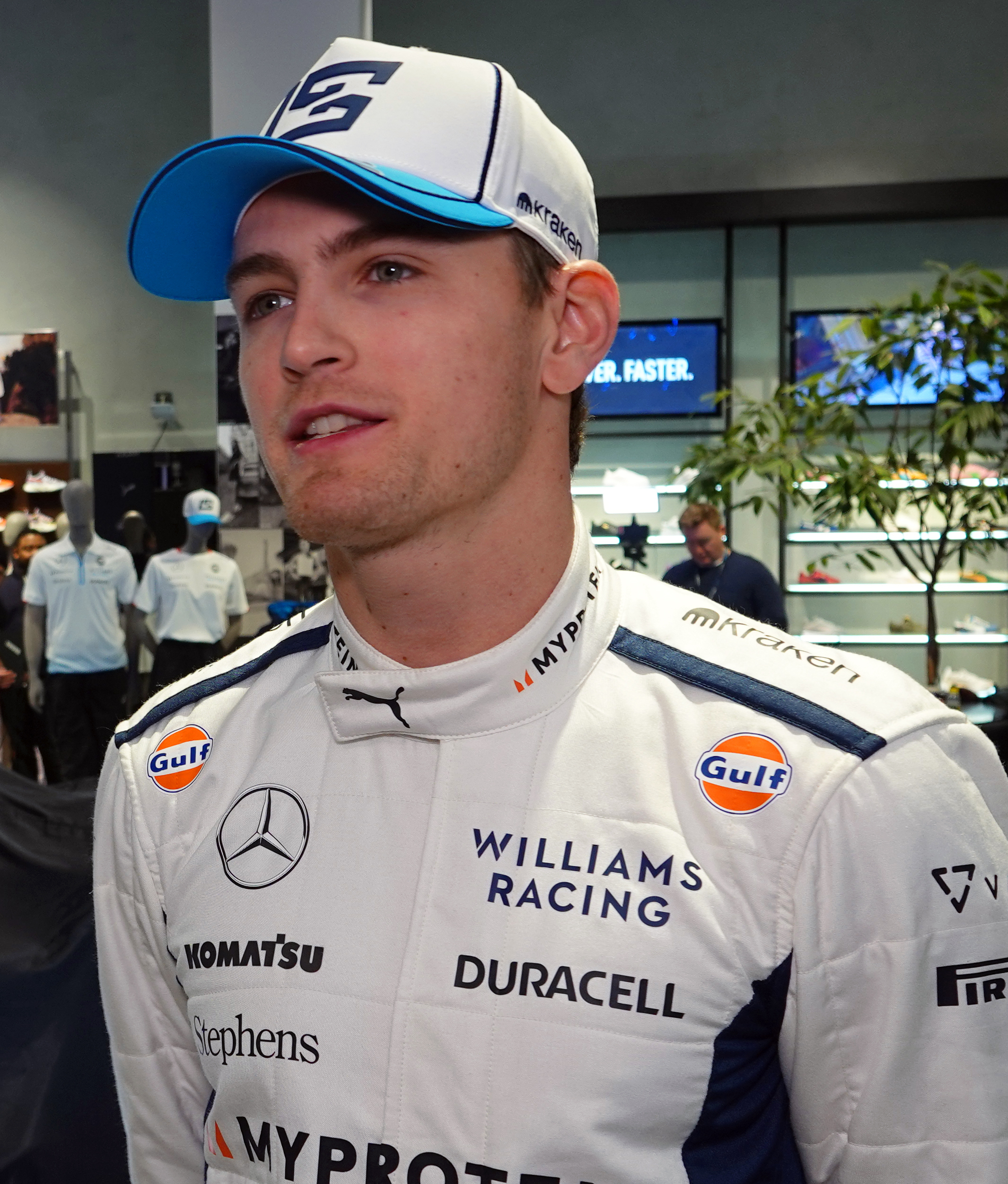
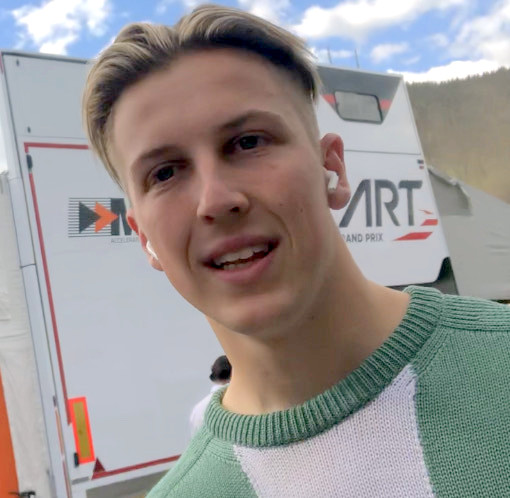
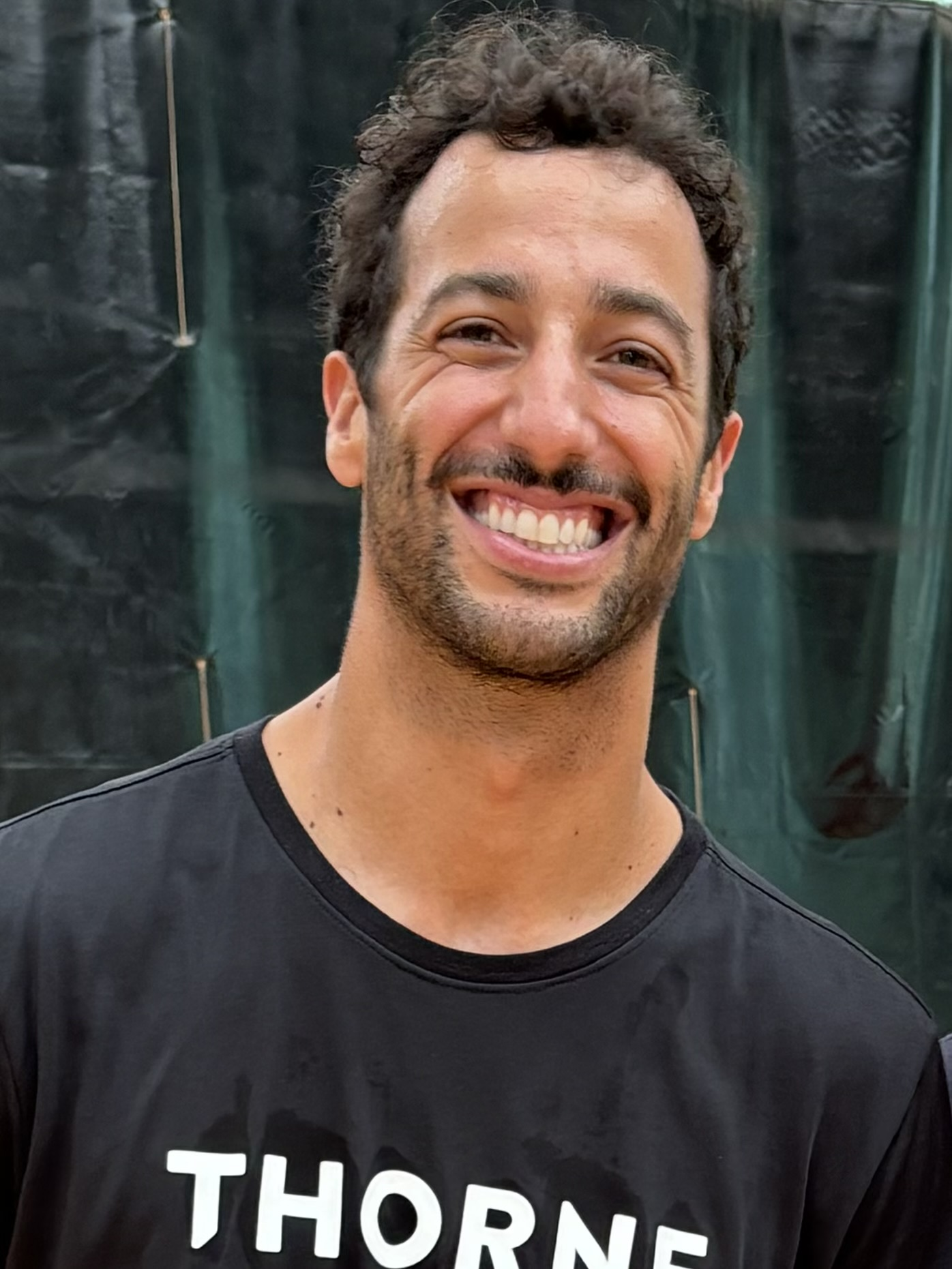
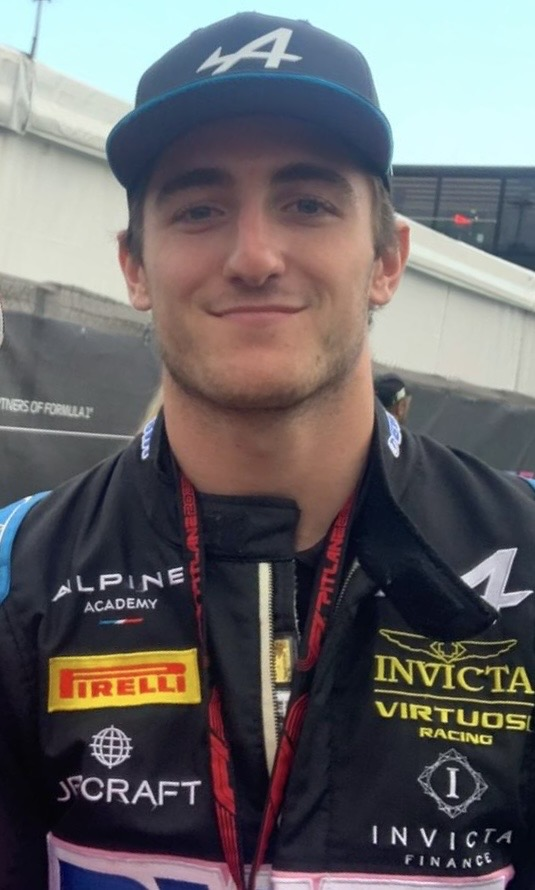
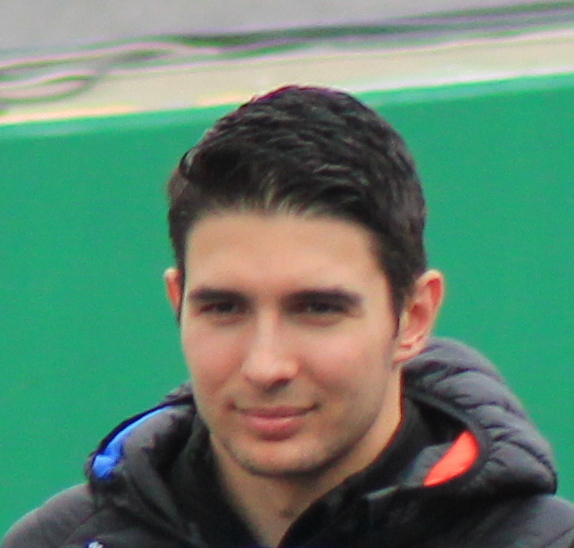
Franco Colapinto (top left) replaced Logan Sargeant (top right) at Williams from the Italian Grand Prix onwards. Liam Lawson (center left) replaced Daniel Ricciardo (center right) from the United States Grand Prix onwards. Jack Doohan (bottom left) replaced Esteban Ocon (bottom right) at Alpine at the Abu Dhabi Grand Prix.

The only change from the drivers contracted at the beginning of 2023 occurred at the former AlphaTauri team, who replaced Nyck de Vries with Daniel Ricciardo from the 2023 Hungarian Grand Prix onwards. All driver and team combinations that competed in the final round of the previous season remained unchanged for the start of the next season for the first time in Formula One World Championship history.

==== In-season changes ====
Carlos Sainz Jr. was forced to withdraw from the Saudi Arabian Grand Prix after he was diagnosed with appendicitis and required an appendicectomy. He was replaced by Ferrari reserve and Formula 2 driver Oliver Bearman, who made his Formula One debut. Sainz returned at the following Australian Grand Prix. Kevin Magnussen of Haas received two penalty points for causing a collision at the Italian Grand Prix, taking his total to twelve penalty points in twelve months, and triggering an automatic race ban for the following Azerbaijan Grand Prix. He was replaced by Bearman, who raced for the second time in the season as a reserve driver. Magnussen returned at the subsequent Singapore Grand Prix. Bearman replaced Magnussen at Haas again during the São Paulo Grand Prix for the free practice and sprint sessions as Magnussen felt unwell. This was later expanded to the rest of the weekend following sprint qualifying.

From the Italian Grand Prix onwards, Formula 2 driver Franco Colapinto replaced Logan Sargeant at Williams, making his Formula One debut. Sargeant was replaced following a series of poor performances, with team principal James Vowles stating that the driver change would give the team the best chance to score points over the remaining rounds. Daniel Ricciardo was dropped from RB due to poor performance ahead of the United States Grand Prix with Helmut Marko, head of the Red Bull's driver development programme, stating that Ricciardo had lost his "killer instinct". He was replaced by the reserve driver Liam Lawson, who drove in the 2023 season in place of the injured Ricciardo at the same team, then known as AlphaTauri. Reserve driver Jack Doohan made his debut at the Abu Dhabi Grand Prix, where he replaced Esteban Ocon at Alpine, after Alpine required Ocon to vacate his seat to drive for Haas in the post-season test.

== Calendar ==
The 2024 calendar comprised a record twenty-four Grands Prix. The Chinese, Miami, Austrian, United States, São Paulo and Qatar Grands Prix featured the sprint format.

Round	Grand Prix	Circuit	Race date
1	Bahrain Grand Prix	Bahrain International Circuit, Sakhir	2 March (Note: Saturday race.)
2	Saudi Arabian Grand Prix	(Saudi Arabia) Jeddah Corniche Circuit, Jeddah	9 March
3	Australian Grand Prix	(Australia) Albert Park Circuit, Melbourne	24 March
4	Japanese Grand Prix	(Japan) Suzuka International Racing Course, Suzuka	7 April
5	Chinese Grand Prix	(China) Shanghai International Circuit, Shanghai	21 April
6	Miami Grand Prix	(United States) Miami International Autodrome, Miami Gardens, Florida	5 May
7	Emilia Romagna Grand Prix	(Italy) Imola Circuit, Imola	19 May
8	Monaco Grand Prix	Circuit de Monaco, Monaco	26 May
9	Canadian Grand Prix	(Canada) Circuit Gilles Villeneuve, Montreal	9 June
10	Spanish Grand Prix	(Spain) Circuit de Barcelona-Catalunya, Montmeló	23 June
11	Austrian Grand Prix	(Austria) Red Bull Ring, Spielberg	30 June
12	British Grand Prix	(United Kingdom) Silverstone Circuit, Silverstone	7 July
13	Hungarian Grand Prix	(Hungary) Hungaroring, Mogyoród	21 July
14	Belgian Grand Prix	(Belgium) Circuit de Spa-Francorchamps, Stavelot	28 July
15	Dutch Grand Prix	(Netherlands) Circuit Zandvoort, Zandvoort	25 August
16	Italian Grand Prix	(Italy) Monza Circuit, Monza	1 September
17	Azerbaijan Grand Prix	(Azerbaijan) Baku City Circuit, Baku	15 September
18	Singapore Grand Prix	Marina Bay Street Circuit, Singapore	22 September
19	United States Grand Prix	(United States) Circuit of the Americas, Austin, Texas	20 October
20	Mexico City Grand Prix	Autódromo Hermanos Rodríguez, Mexico City	27 October
21	São Paulo Grand Prix	(Brazil) Interlagos Circuit, São Paulo	3 November
22	Las Vegas Grand Prix	(United States) Las Vegas Strip Circuit, Paradise, Nevada	23 November
23	Qatar Grand Prix	(Qatar) Lusail International Circuit, Lusail	1 December
24	Abu Dhabi Grand Prix	(United Arab Emirates) Yas Marina Circuit, Abu Dhabi	8 December

=== Calendar expansion and changes ===
The Chinese Grand Prix returned to the calendar for the first time since 2019 after being cancelled for four years in a row due to difficulties presented by the COVID-19 pandemic in the country. The Emilia Romagna Grand Prix, which was cancelled in the preceding year due to flooding in the area, also returned to the calendar. The Japanese Grand Prix moved from its traditional October autumn date to one in April as part of the efforts to group races in regional blocks to help address environmental concerns surrounding travel between races. As a consequence the Azerbaijan Grand Prix moved from April to September. The Russian Grand Prix was under contract to feature on the 2024 calendar, however the contract was terminated in 2022 in response to the Russian invasion of Ukraine.

== Regulation changes ==
=== Technical regulations ===
In response to extreme weather conditions resulting in cockpit overheating during the 2023 Qatar Grand Prix, teams were now allowed to install a "scoop" to the car that is intended to cool down the driver and cockpit area. Teams were not allowed to start wind tunnel or computational fluid dynamics work for the 2026 season, which will see major technical regulations rule changes, until 1 January 2025. However, teams were still allowed to do other preliminary research and development work not covered by these restrictions.

==== Tyres ====
The "alternative tyre allocation" trialled at the 2023 Hungarian and Italian Grands Prix, where drivers were given 11 sets of tyres in an attempt to cut costs in the sport, was discontinued. Therefore, teams reverted to having 13 sets of tyres available per driver during every non-sprint race weekend with the allocation being 12 sets for a sprint weekend. The C0 tyre compound (the hardest compound in Pirelli's dry tyre range), which was introduced but not used during the 2023 season, was dropped from the tyre line-up. This compound was previously known as the C1, but was renamed at the start of the 2023 season following the introduction of a new C1 compound that slotted between the old C1 and current C2 compounds in terms of hardness. A proposed trial for a ban on tyre blankets for this season and a full ban in 2025 was abandoned.

=== Sporting regulations ===
==== Appeals process ====
The decision appeal process was amended for the 2024 season. The deadline to submit a right of review request was reduced from fourteen to four days after an event. In an attempt to stop potentially frivolous appeal attempts, the FIA also introduced a fee for the process.

==== Sprint weekend structure ====
The structure of the sprint weekends was changed again for 2024, with the goal of rationalising sprint events and separating them from the rest of the Grand Prix weekend. A sprint weekend began with a single practice session, followed by the sprint qualifying session, which set the starting grid order for the sprint race. The sprint was then the first session to take place on Saturday, followed by qualifying for the main race. The Grand Prix itself remained on Sunday. The FIA sporting regulations for the championship now referred to the qualifying for the sprint as "sprint qualifying", as opposed to "sprint shootout". The term "sprint qualifying" was previously used in the inaugural season of the sprint format in 2021 to refer to the sprint itself. Additionally, sprint weekends now had two separate parc fermé periods as opposed to one. The first lasted from the beginning of sprint qualifying to the end of the sprint, and the second lasted from the beginning of qualifying for the Grand Prix until the start of the Grand Prix itself.

==== DRS usage ====
The rules for DRS usage in Grands Prix were adjusted slightly. Drivers were now allowed to use DRS one lap after a race start, safety car restart, or red flag restart, one lap earlier than in previous seasons. This modification, tested during sprint events in 2023, was implemented to encourage earlier overtaking opportunities and increase competitiveness in the opening stages of a race.

==== Power unit allocation ====
The FIA increased the number of internal combustion engine (ICE) components and associated power unit elements allowed per driver from three to four per season. This change was made to accommodate the record-length calendar and reduce the frequency of grid penalties caused by engine wear and failure.

==== Maximum lap time ====
Prior to Thursday's two practice sessions at the season-opening Bahrain Grand Prix, updated rules were introduced to discourage drivers from driving too slowly on in-laps and reconnaissance laps during qualifying. Drivers were initially required to not exceed a maximum time taken to drive through each marshalling sector. This was a change from 2023, when the FIA introduced a maximum time across an entire lap. However, prior to Friday's third practice session and qualifying, the rules were reverted to the 2023 full-lap method, though the rule now applied on both in-laps and out-laps.

==== Penalties ====
The standard sanction for a driver overtaking another driver off the track and gaining a lasting advantage was upgraded from a five-second time penalty to a ten-second time penalty, although five-second penalties could still be awarded. The change was made as the five-second penalty was considered insufficient, with drivers regularly gaining more than five seconds through illegally overtaking slower cars off track.

From the Miami Grand Prix onwards the FIA altered the regulations for judging a potential jump start. Under the previous regulations, stewards were unable to penalise a driver for a jump start if it had not been picked up by an FIA transponder. This rule led to Lando Norris of McLaren appearing to avoid a penalty despite visibly moving early at the start of the Saudi Arabian Grand Prix. The update to regulations allowed stewards to penalise a driver if they were moving before the start, even if the transponder did not register the infringement. The regulation also clarified jump starts would be judged "after the four-second light is illuminated and before the start signal is given by extinguishing all red lights."

From the Dutch Grand Prix, penalties accrued during the sprint race which could not be served, due to retirement, could be transferred into grid penalties for their next race. This had already been the case for penalties accrued in Grands Prix.

==== Testing ====
During the summer break, the regulations were updated to allow teams to create mule cars based on existing cars from the 2020–2023 period to enable teams to better prepare for the changes to the technical regulations due for the 2026 season. Teams using the mule cars would only be allowed to use drivers with 500 kilometres (310 mi) of experience of driving a current Formula One car at consistent racing speeds.

==== Red flag procedure ====
During the summer break, the regulations for red flag procedures were clarified: during a red flag period, cars could be instructed to line-up on the starting grid, instead of in the pit lane, where the pit lane needed to be closed for safety reasons. The regulations were additionally altered to state that a driver who stops outside of the pit lane during qualifying and receives physical assistance will no longer be able to participate in qualifying.

== Season summary ==
=== Pre-season ===
A single pre-season test was held at the Bahrain International Circuit in Sakhir on 21–23 February. Carlos Sainz Jr. of Ferrari set the fastest time in the three-day test, Haas completed the most laps.

=== Opening rounds ===
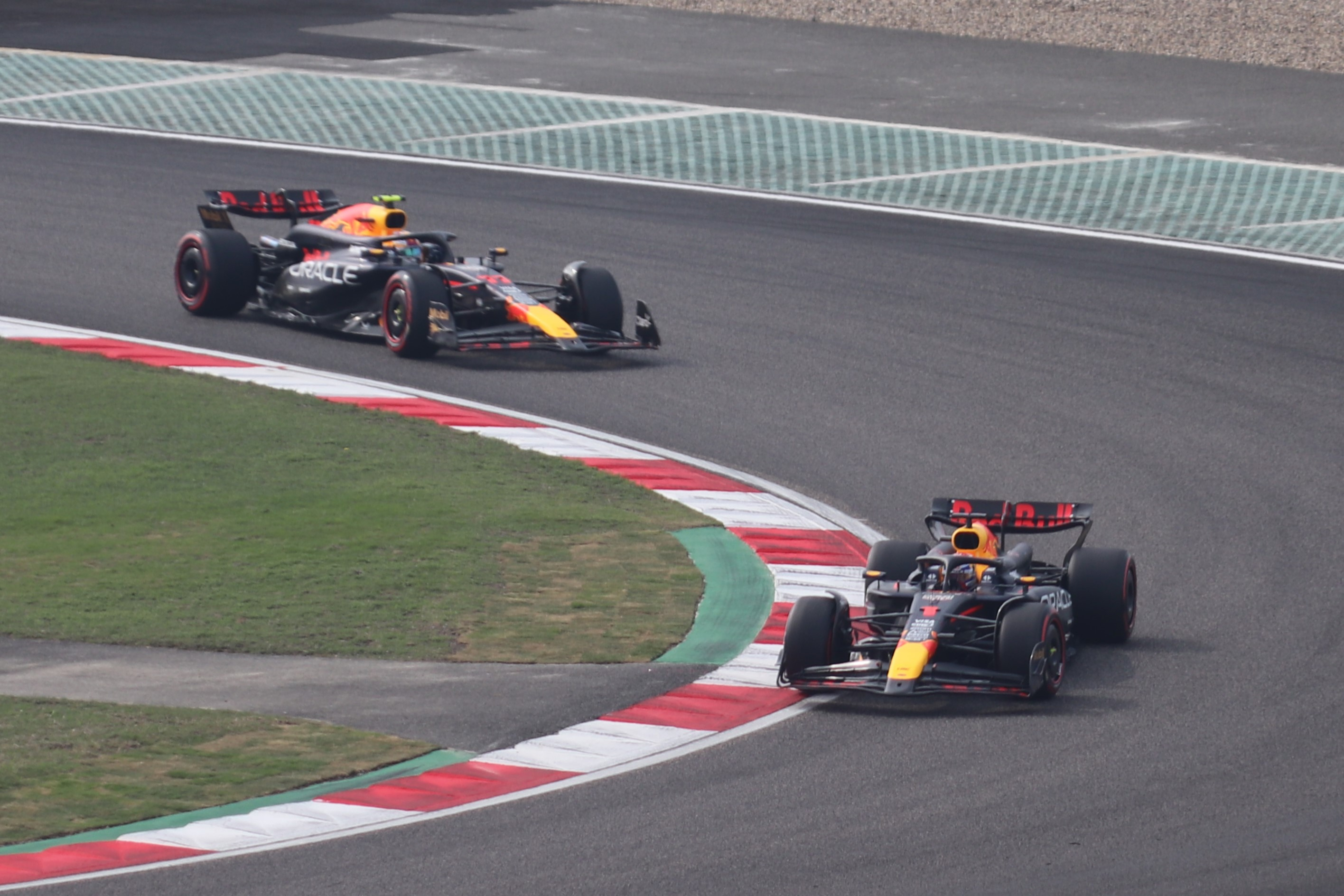
Red Bull Racing dominated the opening races of the season with 1–2 victories at the Bahrain, Saudi Arabian and Japanese Grands Prix, and a 1–3 at the Chinese Grand Prix.

Max Verstappen took pole position at the season opening 2024 Bahrain Grand Prix ahead of Charles Leclerc and George Russell. Verstappen's teammate, and 2023 Championship runner-up, Sergio Pérez qualified fifth. The top three all held their positions at the race start, with Perez moving into fourth ahead of Sainz. Leclerc would lose positions to both Russell, Perez and Sainz in the opening laps. Through the opening pit stops, Perez overtook Russell on track and Leclerc regained a position on Sainz by exucuting an undercut; Sainz would soon make his way back past and would also pass Russell shortly afterwards - although Russell was suffering technical issues - Russell would drop behind Leclerc before the race end. The top five would hold their positions to the race end, with Norris coming in sixth. Following the race, Verstappen led the Drivers' Championship by 8 points from Pérez and 11 from Sainz, eventual championship runnerup Norris was in 6th, 18 points behind Verstappen. In the Constructors' Standings, defending champions Red Bull led Ferrari by 17 points, Mercedes were an additional 11 points back in third and McLaren were 4th, 32 points behind Red Bull.

At the Saudi Arabian Grand Prix, Verstappen took pole. Verstappen led the opening laps of the race. A safety car period, following a crash involving Lance Stroll, was called on lap 7. Verstappen, along with the top 5, chose to make a pitstop during this phase, with Norris inheriting the lead. Verstappen overtook Norris for the lead on lap 12, and held it for the rest of the race. Pérez finished second, having started in third, making his way past Leclerc for second in the early stages, Leclerc maintained third to the race's conclusion. Oscar Piastri finished fourth, having struggled to overtake Lewis Hamilton for a large portion of the race. During the weekend, Sainz was affected with appendicitis, which resulted in his withdrawal from the event on Friday morning to have surgery. In his place, Ferrari junior driver Oliver Bearman, stood in for Sainz. Bearman qualified eleventh and went on to finish seventh, and was widely praised for his performance, having missed the weekend's opening two practice sessions. Following the races' conclusion, Verstappen extended his championship lead to 15 points over Pérez, Leclerc moved into third, 12 points further behind. Norris was seventh, 39 points behind Verstappen. Red Bull extended their lead to 38 points over Ferrari, McLaren moved into third, an additional 21 points behind.

Alex Albon crashed his car heavily during the first practice session for the Australian Grand Prix, writing off the chassis. With no spare chassis available, Williams made the decision for Albon to take over Logan Sargeant's car, with Sargeant withdrawing from the weekend. Team principal James Vowles justified this decision by arguing Albon had a better chance to score points, and praised Sargeant for his sportsmanship. Verstappen took pole position, with Sainz second and Pérez qualifying third, Pérez was demoted three places for impeding, promoting Norris to third on the starting grid. Verstappen retained the lead at the race start, before suffering from brake issues, Sainz made his way past Verstappen into the lead on lap 2, with Verstappen retiring the car shortly afterwards. This retirement meant Verstappen would fail to take a record equalling 10th consecutive victory. Sainz was able to build a lead over his rivals and secured the win largely unchalleged. His teammate Charles Leclerc successfully undercut Norris to take second. Norris completed the podium and succeeded Nick Heidfeld for the most podiums without a victory in Formula One. Piastri finished fourth, having been instructed to let Norris, with Pérez fifth. Alonso and Russell were running sixth and seventh in the final stages, with Russell attacking Alonso, before Russell crashed in the closing laps, Alonso was deemed to have driven in a "potentially dangerous way in the build up to the incident earning him a post race penalty. Following the race Verstappen and Red Bull maintained their championship leads with 51 and 97 points respectively. In the drivers' championship Leclerc moved to second, on 47 points with Pérez third on 46, Norris was 6th on 27. In the constructors', Ferrari closed the gap to 4 points, with McLaren 42 points behind Red Bull.

Verstappen took pole position at the Japanese Grand Prix, 0.066 seconds ahead of Pérez, who had his first front-row start since the 2023 Miami Grand Prix, with Norris third and Sainz fourth. The top five maintained their positions at the race start, before the race was red-flagged due to a heavy crash that involved Daniel Ricciardo and Alexander Albon at turn three, which necessitated repairs to the tyre barriers. The top runners again maintained position at the restart, with Verstappen quickly managing to extend a one-second lead, putting him outside DRS range. Norris was the first on the front runners to pit on lap 12, with the rest of the top four following suit over the next few laps, with Norris undercutting Pérez and Leclerc taking the lead, having yet to make a stop, over the following laps, Verstappen retook the race lead, and Pérez regained second from both Norris and Leclerc before the latter made his pitstop, undercutting Norris into third. In the closing stages Sainz closed in on and overtook Norris for fourth, and then overtook teammate Leclerc for third courtesy of team orders, Sainz was the faster car and Ferrari felt that a battle for position would risk Norris catching and overtaking at least one of the pair. The race therefore ended with Verstappen winning ahead of Pérez, Sainz and Leclerc with Norris in fifth. Ricciardo's teammate Tsunoda scored a point, making him the first Japanese driver to score points at their home race since Kamui Kobayashi's podium in the 2012 edition of the race. Following the race, Verstappen extended his Championship lead to 13 points, with Pérez moving into second, Leclerc a further four points back on 59. Sainz remained in fourth with Norris moving up to fifth. In the constructors' Championship, Red Bull moved to 141 points, 21 ahead of Ferrari and 72 ahead of McLaren.

The Chinese Grand Prix saw the first sprint of the season. Sprint qualifying was held in wet conditions and ended with Norris taking pole ahead of Hamilton and Fernando Alonso. Championship leader Verstappen struggled in the first sprint qualifying of the season, ending up fourth. Verstappen went on to win the sprint race, he gained one position at the first turn, after polesitter Norris ran wide and dropped to seventh after the first lap. Verstappen overtook Alonso for second on lap 7, and Hamilton for the lead on lap 9 where he remained for the rest of the race. Behind Verstappen, Hamilton finished second. In the closing laps, a fight for third place emerged between Alonso, Pérez, Leclerc, Sainz and Norris. Sainz attempted an overtake on Alonso, opening a gap for Pérez to take third and Leclerc fourth. Alonso dropped back with a puncture, allowing Sainz to take fifth ahead of Norris. Verstappen took Red Bull's 100th pole position for the Grand Prix, ahead of Pérez and Alonso. Verstappen managed to maintain his lead into the opening turn, while Alonso managed to overtake Pérez for second around the outside of turn 1. Norris and Piastri retained fourth and fifth. The Ferrari pair of Leclerc and Sainz dropped to seventh and eighth. The opening laps saw Alonso drop down to fourth behind Pérez and Norris, and Leclerc move up to fifth, gaining positions from Hülkenberg, Russell and Piastri before the pit stop phase opened. Alonso, Verstappen, Pérez, Piastri and Sainz all made pit stops before a safety car was deployed. Under this safety car, Norris and Leclerc made their only pitstops of the race, with Verstappen, Pérez and Piastri taking second pit stops for fresher tyres. This saw Verstappen leading from Norris, Leclerc, Pérez and Sainz, Russell, Leclerc and Piastri. The second half of the race saw a battle develop between Leclerc and Pérez for the final podium position, with Pérez moving into third on lap 39. Verstappen was able to win the race, ahead of Norris, Pérez, Leclerc, Sainz, Russell, Alonso and Piastri. At the races conclusion, Verstappen moved to 110 points, 25 clear of Pérez in second, and 34 clear of Leclerc in third. Sainz and Leclerc retained fourth and fifth on 69 and 58 points. In the Constructors' standings, Red Bull moved 44 points clear of second placed Ferrari, with McLaren a further 55 points back.

The Miami Grand Prix saw a second consecutive sprint weekend. In sprint qualifying, Verstappen took pole from Leclerc and Pérez, with Sainz fifth behind Ricciardo. The Mclaren pair were fastest across practice and the opening sprint qualifying sessions but were unable to replicate this in the final part of sprint qualifying and ended up sixth and ninth. At the start of the sprint, Verstappen immediately covered the inside of the opening turn to maintain first place. Pérez attempted a move for second around the outside of the corner but ran wide, yielding third to Daniel Ricciardo. Norris was tipped into a spin at the first corner, and was then hit by Stroll, causing Norris' retirement with terminal damage. After a brief safety car period, the lead drivers initially maintained position. Ricciardo was overtaken for third on lap 5. The race ended with Verstappen winning from Leclerc and Pérez, with Ricciardo able to narrowly hold on to fourth from Sainz and Piastri. Verstappen took pole for the Grand Prix ahead of Leclerc, Sainz, Pérez and the McLaren duo of Norris and Piastri. Verstappen was able to maintain his lead through the first corner. Behind, Pérez locked his front tyres causing Sainz and Leclerc to take avoiding action. Leclerc was able to maintain second, with Piastri making his way up to third ahead of Sainz, Pérez and Norris. A couple of laps into the Grands Prix, Piastri was able to overtake Leclerc for second. Pérez was the first of leading cars to pit, and was soon followed by Leclerc, Verstappen, Piastri and Sainz before the safety car was deployed following a collision between Magnussen and Sargeant. Norris took advantage of this to make a pitstop and rejoined the track in first, ahead of Verstappen, Leclerc, Piastri, Sainz and Pérez. At the safety car restart, Verstappen briefly challeneged Norris for lead, before Norris was able to pull away. Sainz managed to make his way past Piastri. Piastri attempted to retake the position, but collided with Sainz, forcing Piastri to pit for repairs and dropping him out of the points. Norris took his maiden Formula One victory, having previously held the record of the most podiums without a victory, and giving McLaren their first victory since the 2021 Italian Grand Prix. Verstappen was second from Leclerc, Pérez, Sainz, with Hamilton achieving his best result of the season to that point with sixth. Ocon scored Alpine's first point of the season with tenth place. Following the event, Verstappen increased his points tally to 136, 33 ahead of second placed Pérez, with Leclerc in third an additional five points back and Sainz and Norris both on 83 points. In the Constructors Championship, Red Bull extended their lead over second placed Ferrari to 52, and their lead over third place McLaren to 115.

=== Mid-season rounds ===
At the Emilia Romagna Grand Prix, Verstappen took an "unexpected" pole by 0.074 seconds, equalling Ayrton Senna's record of eight consecutive pole positions. Piastri was second, ahead of Norris and the Ferrari pair of Leclerc and Sainz, Pérez qualified 11th. Piastri was demoted to fifth on the starting grid for impeding another driver during qualifying. The top six drivers held positions on the opening lap, with Pérez making up ground and overtaking Daniel Ricciardo for tenth. The leading cars made their pit stops around the twenty lap mark with McLaren duo pitting first and then Verstappen, and the Ferrari pair. During the pit stop phase, Piastri was able to successfully undercut Sainz for fourth place. As the race reached the 40 lap mark, Leclerc closed the gap to Norris, Leclerc being told he was the faster driver of the pair. By lap 50, Norris had stronger pace and was able to pull away from Leclerc and was also able to start closing the gap forward to Verstappen. Norris closed within a couple of seconds of Verstappen, but was unable to overtake before the races conclusion. Verstappen therefore won the race, ahead of Norris and Leclerc. Piastri claimed fourth ahead of Sainz, Pérez recovered to 8th. Norris stated that he could have overtaken Verstappen if the race were a couple of laps longer. Following the race, Verstappen moved to 161 points in the Drivers Championship. Leclerc moved up to second on 113 with Pérez dropping to third on 107. Norris moved into a clear fourth, 6 points behind Pérez. In the Constructors' Standings, Red Bull's lead increased to 56 points over Ferrari, with McLaren a further 58 behind.

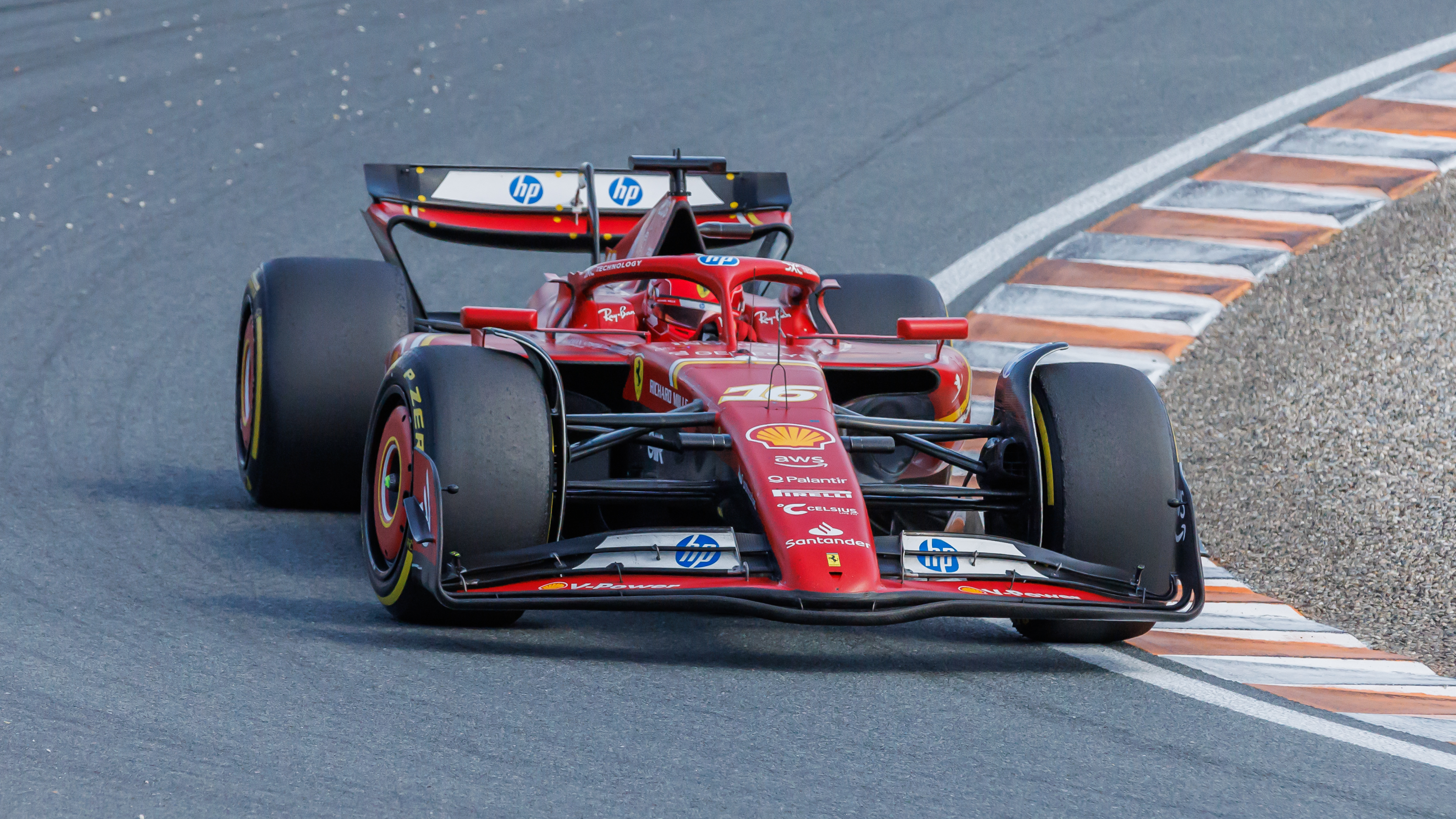
By winning the Monaco Grand Prix, Charles Leclerc became only the second Monégasque driver after Louis Chiron in 1931 to win at their home Grand Prix.

Verstappen's record equaling run of consecutive pole positions ended at the Monaco Grand Prix, as he qualified sixth. Pole position was instead taken by Monégasque Leclerc, ahead of Piastri, Sainz and Norris, Pérez qualified 18th. At the start Leclerc held position, Piastri and Sainz collided lightly at the first corner, resulting in Sainz receiving a puncture which dropped him down the field. Pérez, Magnussen and Hulkenberg were also involved in a collision which stranded the three cars on track, causing a red flag. The race was restarted based on the original starting order, meaning that Sainz would retain his third place start. For the second start, the drivers changed tyre compound, therefore fulfilling the rule to run two tyre compounds allowing them to complete the race without a pit stop. The race was run with the top five within a few seconds of each other, but no overtaking attempts. Leclerc took his first win since the 2022 Austrian Grand Prix and the first at his home Grand Prix. Oscar Piastri took his first podium of the season in second, and Sainz finished third. Following the race, Verstappen's championship lead over Lerclerc was cut to 31 points. Norris and Sainz moved up to third and fourth, 56 and 61 points behind Verstappen, respectively. Pérez dropped to fifth, one point behind Sainz. In the Constructors' Standings, Red Bull's lead was cut to 24 points over Ferrari, and 92 over McLaren.

After Verstappen and Russell set identical lap times during qualifying for the Canadian Grand Prix, Russell secured pole position by virtue of setting the time first. Norris and Piastri were third and fourth, the Ferrari 11th and 12th with Pérez 16th. The race began under wet conditions. Most of the field elected to start the race on the intermediate wet tyre, with the Haas duo of Magnussen and Hülkenberg starting on the full wet tyre. The leading drivers held position on the opening laps. A band of heavy rain played into Haas' favour with Magnussen and Hülkenberg able to make their way through the field, with Magnussen running as high as fourth before the rain eased, and he lost his advantage. With the track starting to dry up, Norris was setting the fastest lap times and was able to make his way into the lead by 21. Verstappen also overtook Russell for second. Norris was able to pull away from Verstappen, with Russell dropping back towards Piastri. The safety car was deployed shortly afterwards, Verstappen and Russell made pit stops immediately, although Norris missed the pit lane and had to complete another lap. This allowed Verstappen and Russell to undercut Norris for first and second. After the safety car was withdrawn, Norris was once again the fastest car on track, but was unable to make a pass on Russell for second. Verstappen and Russell both made pitstops around lap 40 for dry weather tyres, with Norris electing to stay out until lap 47. When Norris made his stop, he was able to overcut Russell and rejoined the track side by side with Verstappen. Verstappen was able to take first, and Norris dropped back on colder tyres, being overtaken by Russell for second, before Rusell made an error, allowing Norris back through. The closing laps saw Verstappen and Norris pull clear and maintain first and second to the end. A fight ensued for the final podium position, which was claimed by Russell ahead of Hamilton and Piastri. Leclerc, Sainz and Pérez all retired. The result saw Verstappen maintain the lead (on 194 points) ahead of Leclerc (138), Norris (131). In the Constructors, Red Bull moved to 301 points, ahead of Ferrari (252) and McLaren (212).

Norris took his second career pole position at the Spanish Grand Prix, ahead of Verstappen, Hamilton, Russell, Leclerc and Sainz. Pérez started the race in eleventh. At the start, Norris moved across the track to cut off Verstappen, with Verstappen ending up in the grass Russell was able to go around the outside of both of them at turn one and took the race lead and Verstappen moving up into second. Lap three saw Verstappen take the lead from Russell. The top three retained their positions until lap 16 when Russell made his pit stop, with Verstappen pitting on lap 17 and Norris on lap 24, with the order staying the same amongst the top three after the initial pit stop phase. Verstappen was able to extend his lead to eight seconds over Russell and Norris, who were fighting for second place, with Norris able to claim the position on lap 35; Russell and Norris's fight allowed Verstappen to extend his lead to nine seconds by the end of lap 36. Norris was able to start eating into Verstappen's lead after taking second, with Norris closing the gap to four seconds by the time Verstappen made his second pit stop on lap 46; this saw Verstappen able to lap faster than Norris. Norris made his own pit stop a few laps later; but it was a slow one, and Norris rejoined the race just ahead of Russell and seven seconds back from Verstappen. Over the closing laps, Norris ate into Verstappen's lead, but was unable to get close eough to attempt an overtake. Verstappen therefore won by 2.2 seconds from Norris; with Hamilton claiming third after overtaking Russell in the closing stages. Russell finished ahead of Leclerc and Sainz. The result saw Verstappen extend his championship lead to 69 points, with Norris moving into second ahead of Leclerc. In the constructor's championship, Red Bull's lead increased to 60 points over Ferrari, with McLaren a further 33 back.

The Austrian Grand Prix featured the third sprint of the season. Verstappen took pole for the sprint race, ahead of Norris and Piastri. Leclerc, third in the drivers championship suffered mechanical problems which left him tenth. In the sprint, Verstappen, Norris and Piastri maintained positions through the opening laps, although Norris did have to defend an overtaking attempt from Piastri on the opening lap, going into turn three. On lap 5, Norris overtook Verstappen going into turn three, before Verstappen retook the position at turn four. Verstappen's overtake left Norris compromised on the corner exit and allowed Piastri to move into second. From there Verstappen was able to successfully pull away, Norris was able to close the gap and apply pressure to Piastri but did not attempt a serious overtaking manoeuvre. Verstappen therefore won the sprint from Piastri and Norris, with Leclerc seventh. Verstappen also took pole position for the main race, ahead of Norris, Russell and Sainz. Leclerc and Piastri were sixth and seventh, with both of them having off track excursions at the end of the session. At the race start, the top three maintained their positions. Leclerc and Piastri made contact at the first turn; Leclerc suffered front wing damage and he made a pitstop for repairs. The opening laps saw Verstappen, Norris and Russell maintain positions, with the gap between the three of them consistently increasing. The leading trio all made their first pit stop between laps 23 and 24 and maintaining their relative positions, with Sainz fourth, Hamilton fifth and Piastri sixth. On lap 52, Norris and Verstappen both made their second pit stops on lap 52. Verstappen suffered a slow pit stop, which allowed Norris to close the gap to around two seconds, down from seven on lap 49. Norris was able to close the gap further and made several overtaking attempts over the following laps. On lap 64, when Norris attempted another overtaking attempt, Norris and Verstappen made contact. Norris retired the car, and Verstappen suffered a puncture which dropped him to fifth; Verstappen was penalised for the collision. The collision allowed Russell to move into the lead ahead of Piastri (who overtook Hamilton on lap 47 and Sainz on lap 55) and Sainz. The race was won by Russell, the second of his career, ahead of Piastri, Sainz, Hamilton and Verstappen. Following the race's conclusion, Verstappen extended his championship lead to 81 points over Norris and 87 points over Leclerc. Red Bull extended their championship lead to 64 points over Ferrari. McLaren (in third) closed the gap to Ferrari to 23 points.

Russell took pole position for the British Grand Prix, ahead of Hamilton, Norris, Verstappen and Piastri. The opening laps saw Russell and Hamilton maintain position and pull away from Verstappen who had moved into third. Norris was able to successfully move back into third on lap 13 with rain starting to fall at around the same time. Piastri overtook Verstappen for fourth shortly afterwards. The following laps saw the McLaren's of Norris and Piastri close the gap to the Mercedes duo. Hamilton overtook Russell on lap 18. By lap 20, both McLaren's had overtaken both Mercedes (Hamilton and Russell) to make the top five: Norris, Piastri, Hamilton, Russell. Of the leaders, Verstappen made the first pit stop on lap 27, followed by Norris, Hamilton and Russell on lap 28 and Piastri on lap 29, all changing to the intermediate-wet tyres. Following the opening pit stops, Verstappen was able to undercut Russell for third, and Piatri dropped to sixth. Russell retired with a water leak shortly afterwards. Hamilton, Verstappen and Piastri all made pit stops on lap 39. Norris suffered a slow stop on lap 40. This moved Hamilton into the lead ahead of Norris, Verstappen and Piastri. The closing laps saw Verstappen close the gap to Norris and successfully overtake him, before beginning to chase down Hamilton, although he would end up short. Hamilton therefore took the win, his first since the 2021 Saudi Arabian Grand Prix, ahead of Verstappen and Norris with Piastri fourth. Following the race, Verstappen moved to 255 championship points, with Norris second (171) and Leclerc third (150). In the Constructors, Red Bull's championship lead increased to 71 points over Ferrari. McLaren, in third, closed the gap to both Ferrari (7 points) and Red Bull (78 points).

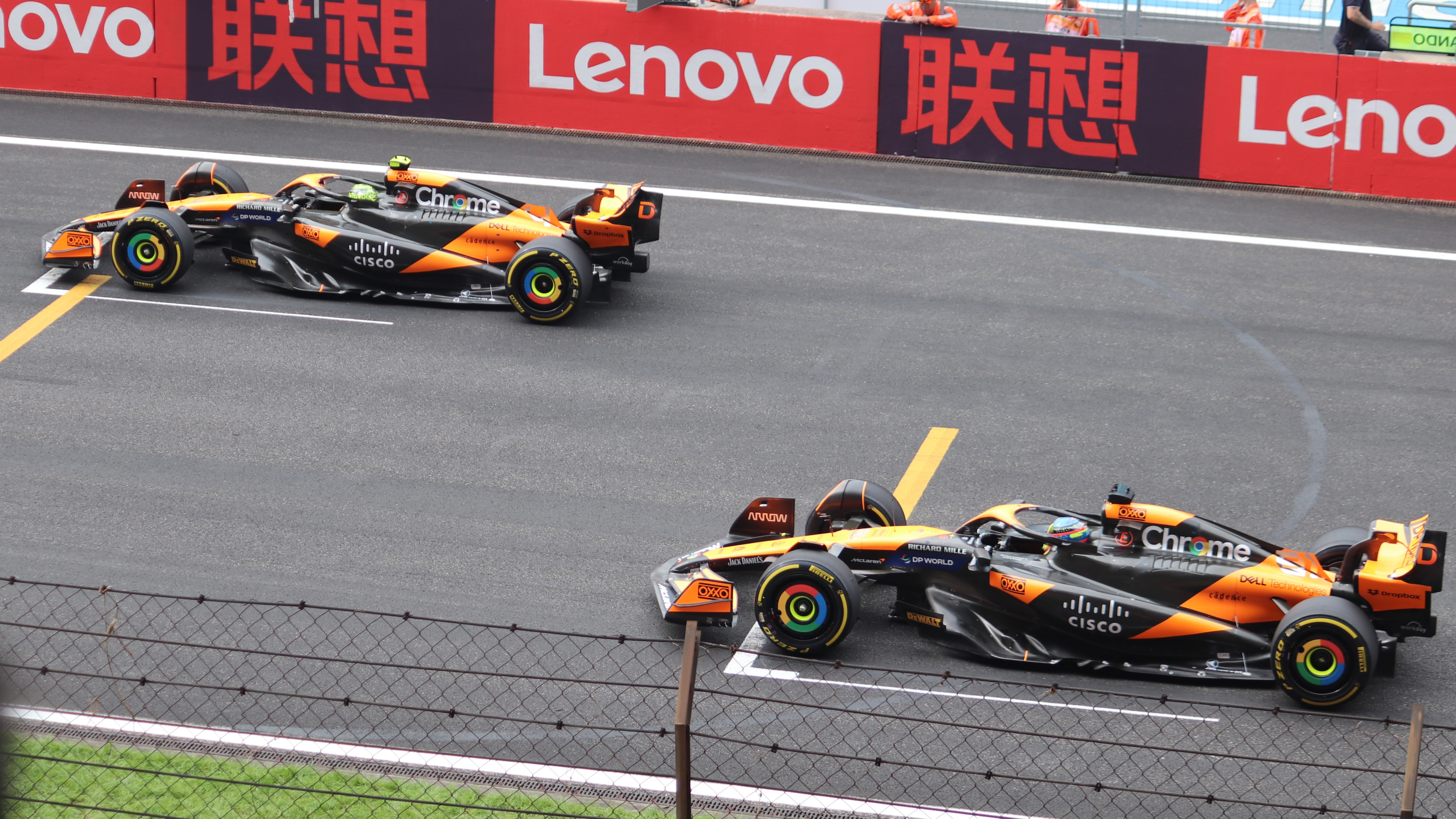
McLaren drivers Lando Norris (left) and Oscar Piastri (right) claimed their maiden wins at the Miami and Hungarian Grands Prix, respectively.

Norris and Piastri took first and second in qualifying for the Hungarian Grand Prix, McLaren's first front-row lockout since the 2012 Brazilian Grand Prix. Verstappen qualified third ahead of Sainz, Hamilton and Leclerc. Norris, Piastri and Verstappen went three wide at the race start, with Piastri coming out on top. Verstappen went wide off the track, and went into second ahead of Norris. Verstappen was instructed by Red Bull to let Norris back past into second, Hamilton was fourth and Leclerc fifth. The top five maintained their positions into the first pit stop phase. Hamilton was the first of the leading five to make his pit stop, followed on consecutive laps by Norris and Piastri, with Verstappen making his stop 5 laps after Hamilton. Piastri and Norris remained in net first and second, but Hamilton successfully undercut Verstappen into third. The leaders maintained their positions through the next stint; with Hamilton defending several overtake attempts from Verstappen. Hamilton and Leclerc both made their second pit stops on 41, followed by Norris on lap 46, Piastri on lap 48 and Verstappen on lap 50. Through the second pit stops, Leclerc was able to undercut Verstappen and Norris undercut Piastri. Norris was immediately told to "reestablish the order at your convenience" an instruction to let Piastri back into the lead. A few laps later, McLaren told Piastri that Norris would let him past "once you get to Lando [Norris]" - the gap at the time was three seconds. Over the following laps, McLaren gave several instructions over team radio to Norris instructing him to allow Piastri into the lead. The McLaren's swapped positions on lap 68 of 70. Verstappen made it past Leclerc, he then fought Hamilton for third. Verstappen made several attempts for the position. On one of these he went off track and lost fourth to Leclerc. Piastri therefore won the race, his first Formula One win, ahead of Norris, Hamilton, Leclerc and Verstappen. Following the race, McLaren team principal Andrea Stella confirmed that swapping positions was an agreed action if one driver had gained over the other during the pitstop phase. Following the race, Verstappen's championship lead was reduced to 76 points from Norris, Norris's advantage over Leclerc in third increased to 27. Red Bull remained in the lead of the constructors's championship, on 389. McLaren moved into second in the championship on 338 points, with Ferrari in third on 322.

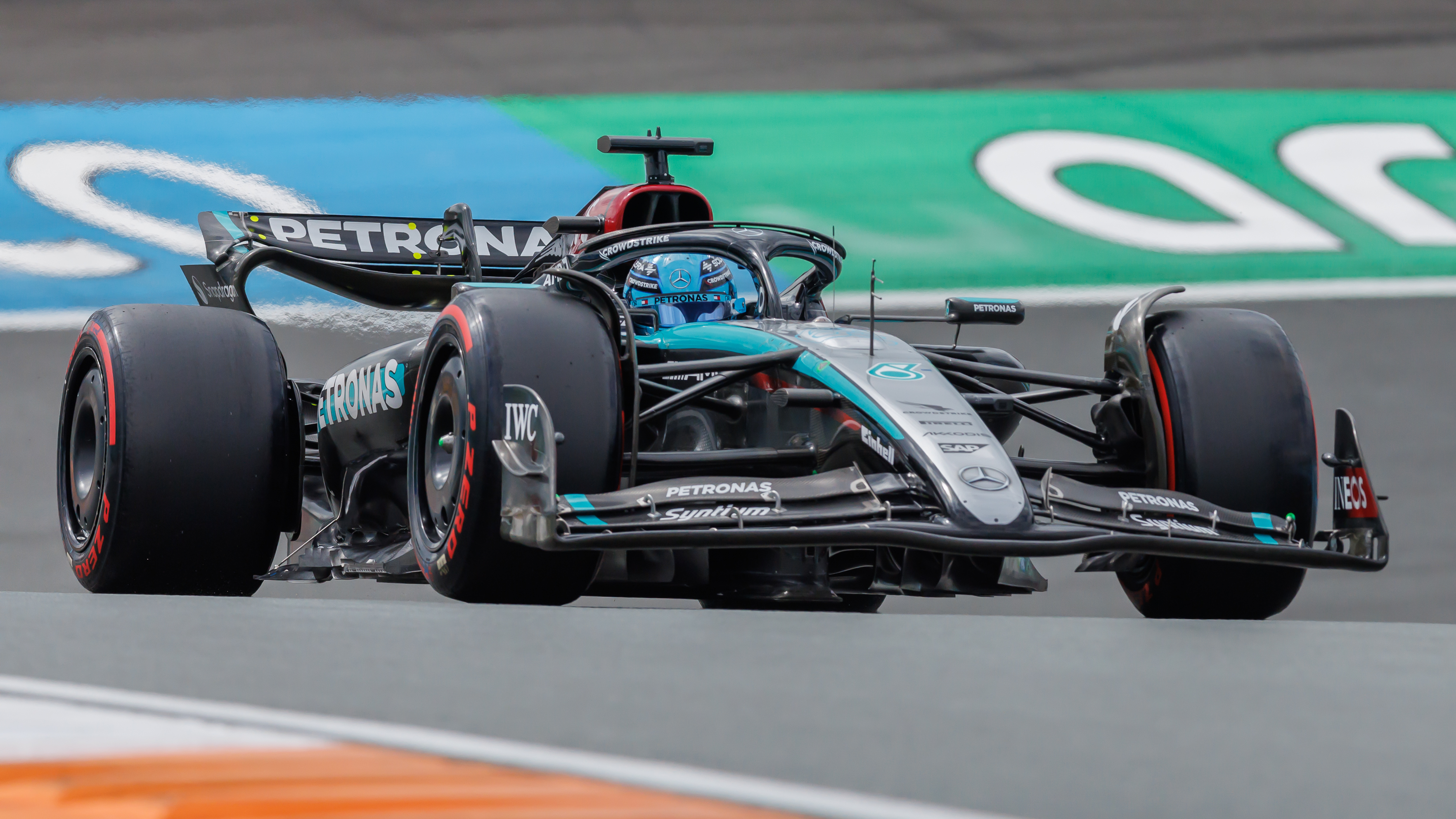
At the Belgian Grand Prix, George Russell became the first driver to be disqualified from a Grand Prix victory since Michael Schumacher in the 1994 edition of the race.

Verstappen qualified fastest for the Belgian Grand Prix, before a penalty for taking too many engine components dropped him to 11th. This promoted Leclerc to pole positions, ahead of Pérez, Hamilton, Norris, Piastri and Russell. Leclerc successfully held the lead at the start, with Hamilton making his way past Pérez. Hamilton would take the lead from Leclerc two laps later. Norris ran wide at the first corner, dropping to seventh, with Verstappen eighth at the end of lap two. The leaders made their first pit stops from lap 14. During this phase, Russell undercut Piastri, and Verstappen undercut Norris. Piastri would overtake Russell and Perez in quick succession to move into net third. Perez would also lose a position to Russell before making his second pit stop on lap 21. The other leading drivers, apart from Russell, made their second pit stops between laps 26 and 31. This left Russell in the lead, approximately six seconds ahead of Hamilton in second, being followed by Leclerc, Piastri, Verstappen, Norris, Pérez and Sainz. Over the following laps, Piastri made several attempts for third from Leclerc before successfully taking the position. By lap 40 of 44, Hamilton had closed the gap to within one second of Russell and started to look for an overtaking opportunity. Hamilton made several attempts but was unsuccessful. Russell was therefore able to cross the finish line in first, having made one stop fewer than his rivals. Russell was later disqualified for having an underweight car. Hamilton therefore inherited the race win, ahead of Piastri and Leclerc, with Verstappen fourth and Norris fifth. Following the Grand Prix, Versappen's championship lead increased to 78 over Norris. Leclerc moved to 22 points behind Norris. In the constructors's championship, Red Bull's lead decreased from 51 points to 42. Red Bull's lead over Ferrari decreased from 67 to 63.

Norris took pole position for the Dutch Grand Prix, ahead of Verstappen, Piastri, Russell, Perez and Leclerc. At the race start, Verstappen was able to move into the lead from Norris, with Russell moving past Piastri into third and Leclerc moved into fifth. Verstappen was initially able to create a gap to Norris, before Verstappen would complain that "the car doesn't want to turn". Norris was able to close the gap to within a second before executing an overtake on lap 16 before pulling away by several seconds. Leclerc, Russell, Verstappen and Norris all made their pit stops on consecutive laps, with Piastri staying out for longer. When Piastri made his pit stop, the top five were: Norris, Verstappen, Leclerc, Russell and Piastri. Norris continued to extend his lead over Verstappen with Piastri making up ground on Russell, before completing an overtake around the outside of turn one. Piastri proceeded to make up ground on Leclerc, catching him with ten laps to go. Norris took the race win, ahead of Verstappen and Leclerc (who successfully defended third from Piastri). With this result, Norris moved to 70 points behind Verstappen, with Leclerc an additional 33 back. In the Constructors's championship, Red Bull moved to 434 points, ahead of McLaren on 404 and Ferrari on 370.

At the Italian Grand Prix, Norris and Piastri locked-out the front row for McLaren ahead of Russell and the two Ferraris of Leclerc and Sainz. Norris was able to maintain his lead at the start, with Piastri following. Russell had to take the escape road at the first corner and damaged his front wing, dropping him to seventh. Russell would make an early pitstop to replace his front wing after a few laps. At the turn 4-5 chicane, Piastri was able to overtake Norris, with Leclerc also making his way past. Norris made his first pit stop on lap 14, and was able to successfully undercut Leclerc, who made his pit stop on the following lap, into second. Piastri was able to maintain the lead following his own pit stop on lap 17. The top three maintained their positions throughout the second stint, with the gaps between them remaining largely stable. Norris made his second pit stop on lap 33, rejoining the race behind Max Verstappen in sixth, Piastri made his pit stop on lap 39, coming back out in fourth, ahead of Verstappen and Norris; Norris made his way past on lap 41, before Verstappen made his second pit stop. On lap 43 of 53, it was Leclerc leading by 11 seconds from Sainz (both drivers running a one-stop stratergy. Piastri closely followed Sainz in third and Norris a few seconds further back in fourth. Lap 45 saw Piastri make his way past Sainz, with Norris making his own way past shortly afterwards. Piastri closed the gap quickly to Leclerc across the closing laps, but was not able to get close enough to attempt an overtake, with Leclerc winning the race ahead of Piastri and Norris, with Championship leader Verstappen in sixth. The race saw the debut of Franco Colapinto for Williams, the team replacing Logan Sargeant for the rest of the season; Colapinto finished twelfth. Following the race, Verstappen's championship lead was cut to 62 points over Norris, Leclerc closed the gap to Norris to 24 points. Red Bull's lead was cut to eight points over McLaren and 39 points over Ferrari.

=== Closing rounds ===
At the Azerbaijan Grand Prix, Leclerc took the pole position ahead of Piastri and Sainz, while Verstappen qualified sixth and Norris down in 17th. Norris would start 15th, following the application of penalties for other drivers. In the race, Leclerc maintained his lead off the line with Piastri in second, ahead of Pérez in third. Verstappen made his way into fifth and Norris had moved into 12th by the end of the opening lap. By lap 8 Norris had moved into the points paying positions. Among the leaders, Russell and Verstappen were the first to make pit stops on lap 13, followed by Perez on 14. Piastri, Leclerc and Sainz all pitted soon afterwards. On lap 19, the order was Leclerc, Piastri, Perez, Albon, Norris, Sainz, Verstappen (Albon and Norris had yet to make their first pit stops). Piastri then made a successful move for the lead of the race on the 20th lap and Sainz moved into fourth shortly afterwards. The next laps saw Piastri and Leclerc hold position Perez lose ground to the leading pair and Sainz lose ground to Perez, and Verstappen struggled to get past Norris and Albon - despite having fresher tyres. Norris and Albon would eventually make their pit stops as the lap counter reached the mid to late 30s, with Norris rejoing the race in seventh, behind Verstappen (who had himself lost a position to Russell) Norris would quickly close the gap to Verstappen (courtesy of fresher tyres) and overtake him with two laps to go. Leclerc and Piastri resumed fighting for position on lap 33, allowing Perez and Sainz to rejoing the battle for the lead on laps 42 and 46 respectively. As Leclerc lost tyre performance, Piastri was able to start pulling away, leaving Leclerc to defend second from Perez and Sainz. The battle would continue until Sainz and Perez collided on the penultimate lap, causing both to retire. Piastri therefore took the race win ahead Leclerc, Russell, Norris and Verstappen. Colapinto, who had made his debut in the previous race, scored the first points of his Formula One career, after finishing eighth. Following the race's conclusion, Verstappen moved to 313 points ahead of Norris (254) and Leclerc (235). McLaren moved into the lead of the Constructors Championship with 476, leading it for the first time since the 2014 Australian Grand Prix. Red Bull dropped to second, with 456 points, the first time they had not led the Constructors' Championship since the 2022 Miami Grand Prix. Ferrari remained in third, on 425 points.

Norris took pole at the Singapore Grand Prix, ahead of Verstappen and Hamilton. At the race start, Norris maintained the lead ahead of Verstappen and Hamilton. Russell and Piastri were fourth and fifth. Norris was able to pull away from Verstappen and Verstappen from Hamilton. Norris would hit the wall, and reported potential front wing damaged, but the team did not make repairs at his pitstop. Across the first phase of pit stops, Norris, Verstappen and Piastri all maintained their positions, but Russell successfully overcut Hamilton into third. Hamilton would subsequently lose fourth to Piastri on track, Piastri making use of fresher tyres - having made his first pit stop 21 laps after Hamilton. Piastri would also overtake Russell. Despite grazing the wall on several occasions, Norris won the race ahead of Verstappen and Piastri with Russell fourth. As a result, Norris's deficit to Championship leader Verstappen was reduced to 52 points, Norris lead over third place Leclerc increased to 34 points. In the Constructors's Championship, McLaren's lead increased to 41 points over second placed Red Bull and 75 points over third placed Ferrari.

At the United States Grand Prix, Verstappen took pole position for the sprint, ahead of Russell, Leclerc and Norris. At the race start, Verstappen maintained the race lead and won the sprint uncontested. Norris moved from fourth to second at the start, and held onto the position for much of the race before Sainz overtook Norris and maintained the position. Norris held onto third with Leclerc fourth. Norris took pole for the main race, ahead of Verstappen, Sainz and Leclerc. Norris and Verstappen retained first and second into the first corner, with Verstappen attempting to overtake Norris on the inside. Verstappen and Norris both ran wide at the corner, allowing Leclerc into the lead. Verstappen maintained second, with Sainz moving into third and Norris dropping to fourth. Through the first pit stops, Sainz successfully undercut Verstappen into second place, with Leclerc and Norris holding positions. Norris was able to close the gap to Verstappen and from lap 43 would start a battle for third place. Norris made it past Verstappen on lap 52, but did so after Verstappen had forced him wide at turn 12. Norris did not return the position, and received a time penalty for leaving the track and gaining an advantage. Leclerc took the race win, ahead of Sainz. Norris finished third on track, but dropped to fourth following the application of his penalty, with Verstappen taking third in his place. Following the race, Verstappen's championship lead increased to 57 points over Norris, His advantage over Leclerc was reduced to 79 points. McLaren's lead over Red Bull decreased to 40 points. Ferrari (in third) moved to within 8 points of second placed Red Bull.

At the Mexico City Grand Prix, Sainz took pole position for the race, ahead of Verstappen and Norris. Sainz lost the lead to Verstappen at the race start, with Norris remaining third. Sainz retook the lead on lap nine, with Norris also attempting to overtake Verstappen. Norris and Verstappen both ran wide, allowing Leclerc to move into second. Verstappen would receive a time-penalty for forcing Norris off track, and received a second time-penalty for leaving the track and gaining an advantage in a separate incident. Verstappen served both his penalties at his pit stop, dropping him to fifteenth. Following the pit stop phase, Norris was able to close the gap to Leclerc in second; Norris was able to make his way past after Leclerc made a mistake and ran wide at the final corner. Norris then started to chase down Sainz, but was unable to catch him before the end of the race, with Sainz winning from Norris and Leclerc. Verstappen finished sixth. Following the race, Verstappen's Championship lead over Norris was cut to 47 points, with Leclerc an additional 24 points back. In the Constructors's Championship, McLaren remained in the lead with 566 points, Ferrari moved into second with 537 points and Red Bull dropped to third, on 512 points.

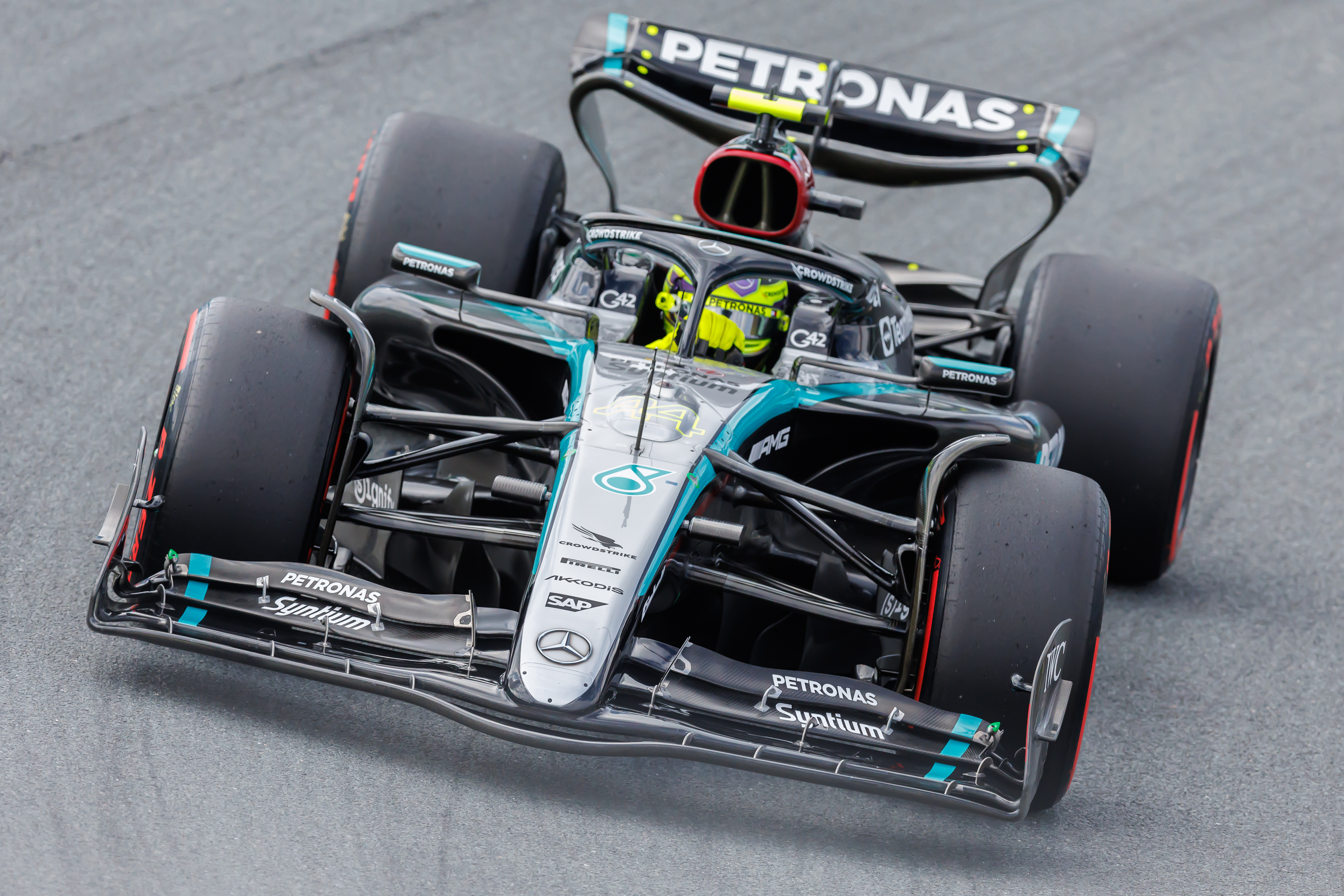
The season would be the twelfth and final year for Lewis Hamilton at Mercedes, with whom he holds several records including most races, wins, and championships with a single constructor.

At the São Paulo Grand Prix, Piastri took pole in sprint qualifying, with Norris second, Leclerc third, and Verstappen fourth. The top four maintained their positions at the start and across the opening laps, with the McLaren duo of Piastri and Norris pulling away from Leclerc and Verstappen. Lap 16 saw Verstappen overtake Leclerc for third, and start to close the gap to Norris in second. Piastri let Norris past into first on lap 22, he remained in first to win. Piastri had to defend second from Verstappen, and was able to hold the position to the end. Verstappen had finished third on track, but received a time penalty for a virtual safety car violation - this dropped him to fourth and promoted Leclerc in his place. Norris took pole position for the main race, ahead of Russell in second. Yuki Tsunoda qualified in third, the highest starting position ever for him and his team RB. Verstappen qualified 12th, but started the race in 17th, after a penalty for changing engine components was applied. The race was held in wet conditions. At the race start, Russell took the lead, with Norris slotting into second. Norris was able to stay close behind Russell. By lap 18, Russell led from Norris, Tsunoda, Ocon, Leclerc and Verstappen. Lap 25 saw Leclerc make a pitstop, the following laps saw Tsunoda (after being overtaken by Ocon), Russell and Norris making pitstops. Norris overtook Russell shortly afterwards. A red-flag was thrown on lap 32, due to heavy ran and a crash for Franco Colapinto. Under the red-flag, the entire field was allowed to change tyres. When the race resumed, it was Ocon who led, followed by Verstappen and Gasly (none of whom had made pitstops before the red flag) followed by Norris and Russell. Shortly after the race, Norris ran wide and Russell was able to retake fourth. Lap 43, after a safety car period, saw several changes at the front of the running order: Verstappen was able to overtake Ocon for the race lead, and Norris slid under braking and falls behind Leclerc and Piastri, Piastri soon let Norris back through. The order would remain unchanged until the race end with Verstappen winning from the Alpine pair of Ocon and Gasly. Norris finished sixth. Following the race, Verstappen increased him Championship advantage to 62 points over Norris and 86 over Leclerc. McLaren's lead over Ferrari was reduced to 36 points, the lead over Red Bull increased to 49 points.

Russell took pole position for the 2024 Las Vegas Grand Prix, ahead of Sainz and Gasly. Verstappen and Norris qualified fifth and sixth. The race start saw Russell stay in first, with Leclerc moving from fourth to second. Although Leclerc was initially able to stay close behind Russell, he soon lost positions to Sainz and Verstappen, with Gasly having dropped back. Through the first pit stop Russell maintained first, with Verstappen moving into second, followed by Sainz, Leclerc, Norris and Hamilton. Hamilton would overtake Norris before the second pit stop phase. Through the second pitstop phase, Hamilton was able to undercut both Ferraris (Leclerc and Sainz) and overtake Verstappen on track to run in second behind Russell. The closing laps saw Hamilton close to the gap to Russell, but not by enough to take the lead, and saw Verstappen drop behind both Ferraris. Norris finished sixth. The result made 2024 the first season in which seven (or more) drivers were able to win multiple Grands Prix. The result saw Verstappen increase his Championship lead to 63 points. With Norris able to score a maximum of 60 point across the remaining rounds, the result was enough for Verstappen to claim the Drivers's Championship, his fourth consecutively. Leclerc moved to with 21 points of Norris for second. In the Constructors' Championship, McLaren's lead over Ferrari was cut to 24 points, and the lead over Red Bull increased to 53.

Norris took pole position for the final sprint of the season, at the Qatar Grand Prix, ahead of Russell and Piastri. Norris held the lead at the race start, with Piastri making his way past Russell into third. Piastri and Russell would spend most of the sprint race fighting for positions, with Piastri holding the position throughout. In the final corner, Norris let Piastri past to take the sprint win, with Norris finishing in second and Russell third. Verstappen set the fastest time in qualifying, ahead of Russell and Norris. Verstappen would, however, take a one-place grid penalty, promoting Russell to pole position in his place. The opening lap of the race saw both Verstappen and Norris move past Russell into first and second, with Leclerc and Piastri fourth and fifth. Piastri would make his way past Leclerc on lap five and would soon close the gap to Russell, with Leclerc remaining close behind. Russell would be the first of the front runners to make a pit stop. A safety car was called on 35, to remove debris, which saw the remaining leaders make their first pit stops and Russell his second. Following these second pit stops it was Verstappen who led, from Norris, Leclerc and Piastri. The safety car restart saw Norris challenge Verstappen and Piastri challenge Leclerc, although no positions were exchanged. Norris would drop out of second, following a penalty for failing to observe yellow flags, allow Verstappen to win the race ahead of Leclerc and Piastri. Russell finished fourth and Norris tenth. Following the race, Verstappen's Championship lead increased to 80 points. Leclerc closed to within 8 points of Norris in second. Ferrari closed the gap to leaders McLaren to 21 points. Red Bull remained third and dropped out of contention for the Constructors' Championship, being 59 points behind with 44 still available. Red Bull were still in contention to take second place from Ferrari.

Pole position at the season-ending Abu Dhabi Grand Prix was taken by Norris ahead of Piastri and Sainz. Leclerc started 19th. Norris retained the lead at the start. Piastri and Verstappen collided at the opening corner - a collision for which Verstappen was penalised - which dropped both drivers down the field. Leclerc made up 11 positions at the start to move into eighth. Leclerc would continue to make up positions. After the first pit stop phase, Norris held the race lead from Sainz, with Leclerc in third. The order of the top three remained stable until the race end with Norris taking the final win of the season. Behind the Ferraris, Hamilton, who started 16th, beat Russell to fourth with Verstappen sixth. Piastri finished tenth. The result was enough for McLaren to win the Constructor's Championship, their first since 1998, with 666 points with Ferrari in second on 652 and Red Bull on 589. In the Drivers's Championship, Verstappen finished on 437 points, with Norris second on 374 and Leclerc third on 356.

=== Post-season analysis ===
Following the season, Verstappen was ranked as the best performing driver by a variety of pundits. He was praised for being consistently the best performing driver despite not having the best car. Perez described his own season as "a very, very difficult year", and Alasdair Hooper described his results as "stark reading". Across the 24 rounds, Perez only beat Verstappen in one race - when Verstappen retired from the Australian Grand Prix. Perez secured four podiums (compared to Verstappen's 14) and failed to finish in the top 5 across the final 14 races, finishing the season in 8th. Following the season's conclusion, Perez and Red Bull "reached an agreement to part ways", despite Perez having a contract to race with Red Bull for two additional years. Red Bull themselves started the year with the fastest car. Later in the year, they were not always the fastest car, but remained competitive throughout. Whilst Red Bull failed to win the constructor title, this was attributed mostly to Perez's lack of competitiveness. Verstappen's title made him only third drivers' champion after Keke Rosberg in 1982 and Nelson Piquet in 1983 to win the drivers' championship with a team that finished 3rd or lower in the constructors' championship, and the second driver after Piquet to win the drivers' championship in a team that did not become constructors' champions on two or more occasions.

Whilst McLaren started the year with the third fastest car, before an upgrade at the Miami Grand Prix (round 6) moved them to the fastest car, on average. Both Piastri and Norris were identified as having breakthrough seasons and were both noted for their consistency in helping McLaren achieve the Constructor's Championship, although both drivers and the team were also noted for making mistakes and having inexperience fighting for the championships. Ferrari were praised for taking a "huge" step forward for the 2024 season as they challenged for the Constructor's Championship and claimed their highest win tally since 2018. In his end of season driver rankings, James Elson identified that Leclerc and Sainz both had their best seasons to date and both drivers were praised for their consistency. Mercedes start to the season was described as "troubled", with Hamilton describing the start to his season as the "worst" of his career. Though Mercedes were able to win a number of races in the middle part of the season, and one at the end, they were inconsistent overall. Russell was praised for outperforming teammate Hamilton. Hamilton was self critical of his results, particularly in qualifying.

Aston Martin's season was described as being a season "significantly below expectations" where they failed to successfully build on their success in the 2023 season, and where they suffered in a dip in performance at the end of the year. The majority of Aston Martin's points came at the beginning of the year, and they scored significantly less points than in 2023. Alonso was praised for delivering some strong performances and Stroll was criticised for underperforming across the year. With Alpine starting the season as the slowest team, and having a double podium in the 21st of 24 rounds (which saw them move from ninth to sixth in the Championship), Alpine were praised for their turnaround during the season, although race fans noted that sixth did not accurately reflect the pace of the Alpine over the season, with analysis showing them as having the eighth fastest car on average. Although a race-by-race head-to-head analysis put Ocon and Gasly almost level, Gasly scored almost two-thirds of the team's points, with Gasly praised for strong performances across the year and Ocon criticised for being too aggressive and being off the pace. Haas's season was described as promising. In a year where they had a series of personnel changes, including a new team principal, they had effective in-season car upgrades and scored consistent points. Hulkenberg comfortably outperformed Magnussen over the course of the year, although both scored high placed-finishes across the season. RB's season was described as having "flashes of potential". Tsunoda was praised for his improvement on the previous year. Whilst Daniel Ricciardo was able to produce some strong performances, these were not consistent, which lead to him being replaced by Lawson mid-way through the season. Williams's season was seen described as a challenging one, but with plenty to be optimistic about: the team falling to ninth in the constructors' championship (from seventh in 2023), a mid-season driver swap and several major accidents, but the team making steps forward off track, with 2024 being seen as a rebuilding year. Albon was able to outperform Sargeant before the latter was replaced. Sargeant's replacement was more competitive, gaining praise for being able to challenge Albon regularly. Kick Sauber's season saw one points finish, eighth in the penultimate round. The season was described as "draining" and "hugely disappointing" with the team in "survival mode".

== Results and standings ==
=== Grands Prix ===
Round	Grand Prix (Note: The Chinese, Miami, Austrian, United States, São Paulo and Qatar Grands Prix featured the sprint format.)	Pole position	Fastest lap	Winning driver	Winning constructor	Report
1	Bahrain Grand Prix	(Netherlands) Max Verstappen	(Netherlands) Max Verstappen	(Netherlands) Max Verstappen	(Austria) Red Bull Racing-Honda RBPT	Report
2	(Saudi Arabia) Saudi Arabian Grand Prix	(Netherlands) Max Verstappen	(Monaco) Charles Leclerc	(Netherlands) Max Verstappen	(Austria) Red Bull Racing-Honda RBPT	Report
3	(Australia) Australian Grand Prix	(Netherlands) Max Verstappen	(Monaco) Charles Leclerc	(Spain) Carlos Sainz Jr.	(Italy) Ferrari	Report
4	(Japan) Japanese Grand Prix	(Netherlands) Max Verstappen	(Netherlands) Max Verstappen	(Netherlands) Max Verstappen	(Austria) Red Bull Racing-Honda RBPT	Report
5	(China) Chinese Grand Prix	(Netherlands) Max Verstappen	(Spain) Fernando Alonso	(Netherlands) Max Verstappen	(Austria) Red Bull Racing-Honda RBPT	Report
6	(United States) Miami Grand Prix	(Netherlands) Max Verstappen	(Australia) Oscar Piastri	(United Kingdom) Lando Norris	(United Kingdom) McLaren-Mercedes	Report
7	(Italy) Emilia Romagna Grand Prix	(Netherlands) Max Verstappen	(United Kingdom) George Russell	(Netherlands) Max Verstappen	(Austria) Red Bull Racing-Honda RBPT	Report
8	Monaco Grand Prix	(Monaco) Charles Leclerc	(United Kingdom) Lewis Hamilton	(Monaco) Charles Leclerc	(Italy) Ferrari	Report
9	(Canada) Canadian Grand Prix	(United Kingdom) George Russell	(United Kingdom) Lewis Hamilton	(Netherlands) Max Verstappen	(Austria) Red Bull Racing-Honda RBPT	Report
10	(Spain) Spanish Grand Prix	(United Kingdom) Lando Norris	(United Kingdom) Lando Norris	(Netherlands) Max Verstappen	(Austria) Red Bull Racing-Honda RBPT	Report
11	(Austria) Austrian Grand Prix	(Netherlands) Max Verstappen	(Spain) Fernando Alonso	(United Kingdom) George Russell	(Germany) Mercedes	Report
12	(United Kingdom) British Grand Prix	(United Kingdom) George Russell	(Spain) Carlos Sainz Jr.	(United Kingdom) Lewis Hamilton	(Germany) Mercedes	Report
13	(Hungary) Hungarian Grand Prix	(United Kingdom) Lando Norris	(United Kingdom) George Russell	(Australia) Oscar Piastri	(United Kingdom) McLaren-Mercedes	Report
14	(Belgium) Belgian Grand Prix	(Monaco) Charles Leclerc (Note: Max Verstappen set the fastest time in qualifying, but received a ten-place grid penalty for exceeding his quota of internal combustion engine components. Charles Leclerc was promoted to pole position in his place.)	(Mexico) Sergio Pérez	(United Kingdom) Lewis Hamilton (Note: George Russell originally won the race, but was later disqualified due to an underweight car. Lewis Hamilton, initially classified second, inherited the win.)	(Germany) Mercedes	Report
15	(Netherlands) Dutch Grand Prix	(United Kingdom) Lando Norris	(United Kingdom) Lando Norris	(United Kingdom) Lando Norris	(United Kingdom) McLaren-Mercedes	Report
16	(Italy) Italian Grand Prix	(United Kingdom) Lando Norris	(United Kingdom) Lando Norris	(Monaco) Charles Leclerc	(Italy) Ferrari	Report
17	Azerbaijan Grand Prix	(Monaco) Charles Leclerc	(United Kingdom) Lando Norris	(Australia) Oscar Piastri	(United Kingdom) McLaren-Mercedes	Report
18	Singapore Grand Prix	(United Kingdom) Lando Norris	(Australia) Daniel Ricciardo	(United Kingdom) Lando Norris	(United Kingdom) McLaren-Mercedes	Report
19	United States Grand Prix	(United Kingdom) Lando Norris	(France) Esteban Ocon	(Monaco) Charles Leclerc	(Italy) Ferrari	Report
20	Mexico City Grand Prix	(Spain) Carlos Sainz Jr.	(Monaco) Charles Leclerc	(Spain) Carlos Sainz Jr.	(Italy) Ferrari	Report
21	(Brazil) São Paulo Grand Prix	(United Kingdom) Lando Norris	(Netherlands) Max Verstappen	(Netherlands) Max Verstappen	(Austria) Red Bull Racing-Honda RBPT	Report
22	(United States) Las Vegas Grand Prix	(United Kingdom) George Russell	(United Kingdom) Lando Norris	(United Kingdom) George Russell	(Germany) Mercedes	Report
23	Qatar Grand Prix	(United Kingdom) George Russell (Note: Max Verstappen set the fastest time in qualifying, but later received a one-place grid penalty for driving unnecessarily slowly. George Russell was promoted to pole position in his place.)	(United Kingdom) Lando Norris	(Netherlands) Max Verstappen	(Austria) Red Bull Racing-Honda RBPT	Report
24	(United Arab Emirates) Abu Dhabi Grand Prix	(United Kingdom) Lando Norris	(Denmark) Kevin Magnussen	(United Kingdom) Lando Norris	(United Kingdom) McLaren-Mercedes	Report

=== Scoring system ===
Points were awarded to the top ten classified drivers, the driver who set the fastest lap during the Grand Prix (only if they finished in top ten), and the top eight of the sprint. In the case of a tie on points, a countback system was used where the driver with the most Grand Prix wins is ranked higher. If the number of wins was identical, then the number of second places was considered, and so on. Points were awarded using the following system:

Position	1st	2nd	3rd	4th	5th	6th	7th	8th	9th	10th	FL
Race	25	18	15	12	10	8	6	4	2	1	1
Sprint	8	7	6	5	4	3	2	1			

=== World Drivers' Championship standings ===
Pos.	Driver	BHR (Bahrain)	SAU (Saudi Arabia)	AUS (Australia)	JPN (Japan)	CHN (China)	MIA (United States)	EMI (Italy)	MON (Monaco)	CAN (Canada)	ESP (Spain)	AUT (Austria)	GBR (United Kingdom)	HUN (Hungary)	BEL (Belgium)	NED (Netherlands)	ITA (Italy)	AZE (Azerbaijan)	SIN (Singapore)	USA (United States)	MXC (Mexico)	SAP (Brazil)	LVG (United States)	QAT (Qatar)	ABU (United Arab Emirates)	Points
1	(Netherlands) Max Verstappen	1^{P}^{F}	1^{P}	Ret^{P}	1^{P}^{F}	1^{1 P}	2^{1 P}	1^{P}	6	1	1	5^{1 P}	2	5	4	2	6	5	2	3^{1}	6	1^{4 F}	5	1^{8}	6	437
2	(United Kingdom) Lando Norris	6	8	3	5	2^{6}	1	2	4	2	2^{P}^{F}	20†^{3}	3	2^{P}	5	1^{P}^{F}	3^{P}^{F}	4^{F}	1^{P}	4^{3 P}	2	6^{1 P}	6^{F}	10^{2 F}	1^{P}	374
3	(Monaco) Charles Leclerc	4	3^{F}	2^{F}	4	4^{4}	3^{2}	3	1^{P}	Ret	5	11^{7}	14	4	3^{P}	3	1	2^{P}	5	1^{4}	3^{F}	5^{3}	4	2^{5}	3	356
4	(Australia) Oscar Piastri	8	4	4	8	8^{7}	13^{6 F}	4	2	5	7	2^{2}	4	1	2	4	2	1	3	5	8	8^{2}	7	3^{1}	10	292
5	(Spain) Carlos Sainz Jr.	3	WD	1	3	5^{5}	5^{5}	5	3	Ret	6	3^{5}	5^{F}	6	6	5	4	18†	7	2^{2}	1^{P}	Ret^{5}	3	6^{4}	2	290
6	(United Kingdom) George Russell	5	6	17†	7	6^{8}	8	7^{F}	5	3^{P}	4	1^{4}	Ret^{P}	8^{F}	DSQ	7	7	3	4	6^{5}	5	4^{6}	1^{P}	4^{3 P}	5	245
7	(United Kingdom) Lewis Hamilton	7	9	Ret	9	9^{2}	6	6	7^{F}	4^{F}	3	4^{6}	1	3	1	8	5	9	6	Ret^{6}	4	10	2	12^{6}	4	223
8	(Mexico) Sergio Pérez	2	2	5	2	3^{3}	4^{3}	8	Ret	Ret	8	7^{8}	17	7	7^{F}	6	8	17†	10	7	17	11^{8}	10	Ret	Ret	152
9	(Spain) Fernando Alonso	9	5	8	6	7^{F}	9	19	11	6	12	18^{F}	8	11	8	10	11	6	8	13	Ret	14	11	7	9	70
10	(France) Pierre Gasly	18	Ret	13	16	13	12	16	10	9	9	10	DNS	Ret	13	9	15	12	17	12	10	3^{7}	Ret	5	7	42
11	(Germany) Nico Hülkenberg	16	10	9	11	10	11^{7}	11	Ret	11	11	6	6	13	18	11	17	11	9	8^{8}	9	DSQ	8	Ret^{7}	8	41
12	(Japan) Yuki Tsunoda	14	15	7	10	Ret	7^{8}	10	8	14	19	14	10	9	16	17	Ret	Ret	12	14	Ret	7	9	13	12	30
13	(Canada) Lance Stroll	10	Ret	6	12	15	17	9	14	7	14	13	7	10	11	13	19	19†	14	15	11	DNS	15	Ret	14	24
14	(France) Esteban Ocon	17	13	16	15	11	10	14	Ret	10	10	12	16	18	9	15	14	15	13	18^{F}	13	2	17	Ret		23
15	(Denmark) Kevin Magnussen	12	12	10	13	16	19	12	Ret	12	17	8	12	15	14	18	10		19†	11^{7}	7	WD	12	9	16^{F}	16
16	(Thailand) Alexander Albon	15	11	11	Ret	12	18	Ret	9	Ret	18	15	9	14	12	14	9	7	Ret	16	Ret	DNS	Ret	15	11	12
17	(Australia) Daniel Ricciardo	13	16	12	Ret	Ret	15^{4}	13	12	8	15	9	13	12	10	12	13	13	18^{F}							12
18	(United Kingdom) Oliver Bearman		7															10				12				7
19	(Argentina) Franco Colapinto																12	8	11	10	12	Ret	14	Ret	Ret	5
20	(China) Zhou Guanyu	11	18	15	Ret	14	14	15	16	15	13	17	18	19	Ret	20	18	14	15	19	15	15	13	8	13	4
21	(New Zealand) Liam Lawson																			9	16	9	16	14	17†	4
22	(Finland) Valtteri Bottas	19	17	14	14	Ret	16	18	13	13	16	16	15	16	15	19	16	16	16	17	14	13	18	11	Ret	0
23	(United States) Logan Sargeant	20	14	WD	17	17	Ret	17	15	Ret	20	19	11	17	17	16										0
24	(Australia) Jack Doohan																								15	0
Pos.	Driver	BHR (Bahrain)	SAU (Saudi Arabia)	AUS (Australia)	JPN (Japan)	CHN (China)	MIA (United States)	EMI (Italy)	MON (Monaco)	CAN (Canada)	ESP (Spain)	AUT (Austria)	GBR (United Kingdom)	HUN (Hungary)	BEL (Belgium)	NED (Netherlands)	ITA (Italy)	AZE (Azerbaijan)	SIN (Singapore)	USA (United States)	MXC (Mexico)	SAP (Brazil)	LVG (United States)	QAT (Qatar)	ABU (United Arab Emirates)	Points

Key
Colour	Result
Gold	Winner
Silver	Second place
Bronze	Third place
Green	Other points position
Blue	Other classified position
Blue	Not classified, finished (NC)
Purple	Not classified, retired (Ret)
Red	Did not qualify (DNQ)
Black	Disqualified (DSQ)
White	Did not start (DNS)
White	Race cancelled (C)
Blank	Did not practice (DNP)
Blank	Excluded (EX)
Blank	Did not arrive (DNA)
Blank	Withdrawn (WD)
Blank	Did not enter (empty cell)
Annotation	Meaning
P	Pole position
F	Fastest lap
Superscript number	Points-scoring position in sprint

Notes:

- † – Driver did not finish the Grand Prix, but was classified as he completed more than 90% of the race distance.

=== World Constructors' Championship standings ===
Pos.	Constructor	BHR (Bahrain)	SAU (Saudi Arabia)	AUS (Australia)	JPN (Japan)	CHN (China)	MIA (United States)	EMI (Italy)	MON (Monaco)	CAN (Canada)	ESP (Spain)	AUT (Austria)	GBR (United Kingdom)	HUN (Hungary)	BEL (Belgium)	NED (Netherlands)	ITA (Italy)	AZE (Azerbaijan)	SIN (Singapore)	USA (United States)	MXC (Mexico)	SAP (Brazil)	LVG (United States)	QAT (Qatar)	ABU (United Arab Emirates)	Points
1	(United Kingdom) McLaren-Mercedes	6	4	3	5	2^{6}	1	2	2	2	2^{P}^{F}	2^{2}	3	1	2	1^{P}^{F}	2	1	1^{P}	4^{3 P}	2	6^{1 P}	6^{F}	3^{1}	1^{P}	666
1	(United Kingdom) McLaren-Mercedes	8	8	4	8	8^{7}	13^{6 F}	4	4	5	7	20†^{3}	4	2^{P}	5	4	3^{P}^{F}	4^{F}	3	5	8	8^{2}	7	10^{2 F}	10	666
2	(Italy) Ferrari	3	3^{F}	1	3	4^{4}	3^{2}	3	1^{P}	Ret	5	3^{5}	5^{F}	4	3^{P}	3	1	2^{P}	5	1^{4}	1^{P}	5^{3}	3	2^{5}	2	652
2	(Italy) Ferrari	4	7	2^{F}	4	5^{5}	5^{5}	5	3	Ret	6	11^{7}	14	6	6	5	4	18†	7	2^{2}	3^{F}	Ret^{5}	4	6^{4}	3	652
3	(Austria) Red Bull Racing-Honda RBPT	1^{P}^{F}	1^{P}	5	1^{P}^{F}	1^{1 P}	2^{1 P}	1^{P}	6	1	1	5^{1 P}	2	5	4	2	6	5	2	3^{1}	6	1^{4 F}	5	1^{8}	6	589
3	(Austria) Red Bull Racing-Honda RBPT	2	2	Ret^{P}	2	3^{3}	4^{3}	8	Ret	Ret	8	7^{8}	17	7	7^{F}	6	8	17†	10	7	17	11^{8}	10	Ret	Ret	589
4	(Germany) Mercedes	5	6	17†	7	6^{8}	6	6	5	3^{P}	3	1^{4}	1	3	1	7	5	3	4	6^{5}	4	4^{6}	1^{P}	4^{3 P}	4	468
4	(Germany) Mercedes	7	9	Ret	9	9^{2}	8	7^{F}	7^{F}	4^{F}	4	4^{6}	Ret^{P}	8^{F}	DSQ	8	7	9	6	Ret^{6}	5	10	2	12^{6}	5	468
5	(United Kingdom) Aston Martin Aramco-Mercedes	9	5	6	6	7^{F}	9	9	11	6	12	13	7	10	8	10	11	6	8	13	11	14	11	7	9	94
5	(United Kingdom) Aston Martin Aramco-Mercedes	10	Ret	8	12	15	17	19	14	7	14	18^{F}	8	11	11	13	19	19†	14	15	Ret	DNS	15	Ret	14	94
6	(France) Alpine-Renault	17	13	13	15	11	10	14	10	9	9	10	16	18	9	9	14	12	13	12	10	2	17	5	7	65
6	(France) Alpine-Renault	18	Ret	16	16	13	12	16	Ret	10	10	12	DNS	Ret	13	15	15	15	17	18^{F}	13	3^{7}	Ret	Ret	15	65
7	(United States) Haas-Ferrari	12	10	9	11	10	11^{7}	11	Ret	11	11	6	6	13	14	11	10	10	9	8^{8}	7	12	8	9	8	58
7	(United States) Haas-Ferrari	16	12	10	13	16	19	12	Ret	12	17	8	12	15	18	18	17	11	19†	11^{7}	9	DSQ	12	Ret^{7}	16^{F}	58
8	(Italy) RB-Honda RBPT	13	15	7	10	Ret	7^{8}	10	8	8	15	9	10	9	10	12	13	13	12	9	16	7	9	13	12	46
8	(Italy) RB-Honda RBPT	14	16	12	Ret	Ret	15^{4}	13	12	14	19	14	13	12	16	17	Ret	Ret	18^{F}	14	Ret	9	16	14	17†	46
9	(United Kingdom) Williams-Mercedes	15	11	11	17	12	18	17	9	Ret	18	15	9	14	12	14	9	7	11	10	12	Ret	14	15	11	17
9	(United Kingdom) Williams-Mercedes	20	14	WD	Ret	17	Ret	Ret	15	Ret	20	19	11	17	17	16	12	8	Ret	16	Ret	DNS	Ret	Ret	Ret	17
10	(Switzerland) Kick Sauber-Ferrari	11	17	14	14	14	14	15	13	13	13	16	15	16	15	19	16	14	15	17	14	13	13	8	13	4
10	(Switzerland) Kick Sauber-Ferrari	19	18	15	Ret	Ret	16	18	16	15	16	17	18	19	Ret	20	18	16	16	19	15	15	18	11	Ret	4
Pos.	Constructor	BHR (Bahrain)	SAU (Saudi Arabia)	AUS (Australia)	JPN (Japan)	CHN (China)	MIA (United States)	EMI (Italy)	MON (Monaco)	CAN (Canada)	ESP (Spain)	AUT (Austria)	GBR (United Kingdom)	HUN (Hungary)	BEL (Belgium)	NED (Netherlands)	ITA (Italy)	AZE (Azerbaijan)	SIN (Singapore)	USA (United States)	MXC (Mexico)	SAP (Brazil)	LVG (United States)	QAT (Qatar)	ABU (United Arab Emirates)	Points

Key
Colour	Result
Gold	Winner
Silver	Second place
Bronze	Third place
Green	Other points position
Blue	Other classified position
Blue	Not classified, finished (NC)
Purple	Not classified, retired (Ret)
Red	Did not qualify (DNQ)
Black	Disqualified (DSQ)
White	Did not start (DNS)
White	Race cancelled (C)
Blank	Did not practice (DNP)
Blank	Excluded (EX)
Blank	Did not arrive (DNA)
Blank	Withdrawn (WD)
Blank	Did not enter (empty cell)
Annotation	Meaning
P	Pole position
F	Fastest lap
Superscript number	Points-scoring position in sprint

Notes:

- † – Driver did not finish the Grand Prix, but was classified as he completed more than 90% of the race distance.
- Rows are not related to the drivers: within each constructor, individual Grand Prix standings are sorted purely based on the final classification in the race (not by total points scored in the event, which includes points awarded for fastest lap and sprint).
