= Andrea Stella =

Italian motorsport executive (born 1971)

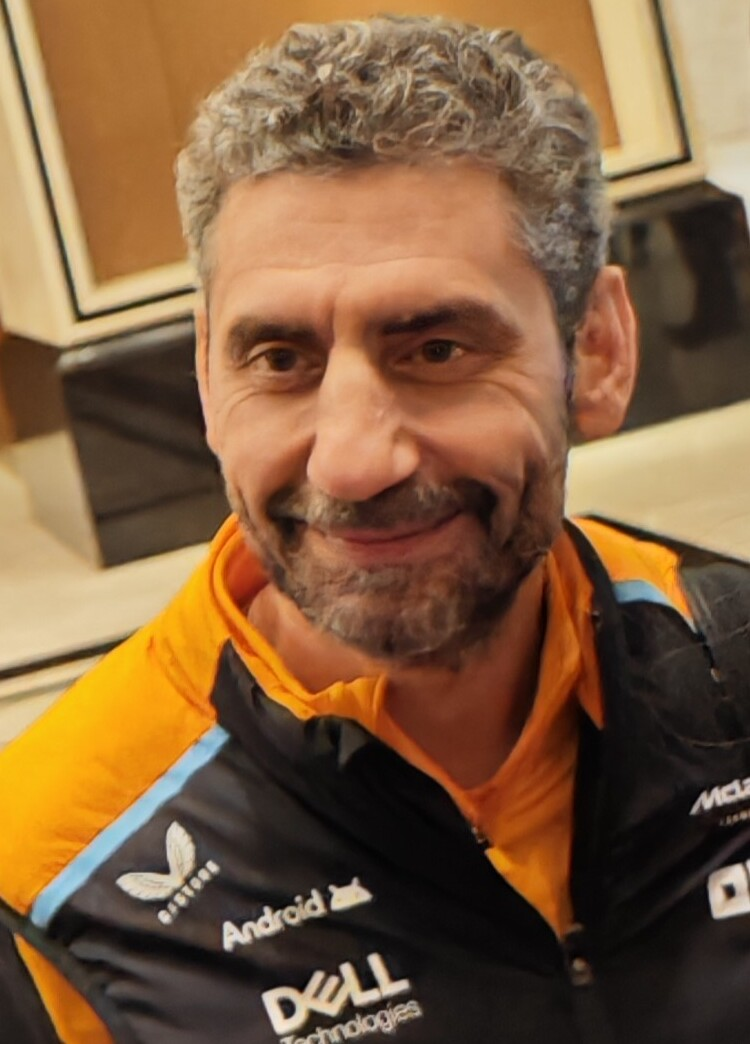
- Stella at the 2024 Chinese Grand Prix
- Born: 22 February 1971 (age 55); Orvieto, Umbria, Italy
- Education: Sapienza University of Rome (BS, PhD)
- Occupations: Motorsport executive; engineer
- Employers: Formula One; Ferrari (2000–2014); McLaren (2015–present)
- Title: Team Principal
- Spouse: Michela Di Eugenio
- Children: 2

Andrea Stella (Italian pronunciation: [anˈdrɛːa ˈstella]; born 22 February 1971) is an Italian engineer and motorsport executive. Since 2023, Stella has served as team principal of McLaren in Formula One, winning two World Constructors' Championship titles in 2024 and 2025.

Born and raised in Orvieto, Stella graduated from Sapienza University of Rome with a degree in aerospace engineering and a doctorate in mechanical engineering. He began his career at Ferrari in 2000 as a performance engineer, later serving as the race engineer for Kimi Räikkönen in 2009, as well as for Fernando Alonso from 2010 to 2014, who finished runner-up to Sebastian Vettel in the World Drivers' Championship three times.

Stella moved to McLaren in 2015 as head of race operations, becoming the performance director by 2018 and the racing director in 2019. In 2023, he replaced Andreas Seidl as team principal; in his second season, he led the team to their first World Constructors' Championship in 26 years, which they successfully defended in 2025 with a joint-record six remaining Grands Prix. Under Stella, McLaren have achieved 22 race wins, 24 pole positions, 24 fastest laps, and 71 podium finishes across three seasons.

== Early life and education ==
Andrea Stella was born on 22 February 1971 in Orvieto, Umbria, Italy. In 1997, Stella graduated from Sapienza University of Rome with a degree in aerospace engineering. He completed a doctorate in mechanical engineering with an experimental study on fluid dynamics of flames in 2000.

== Formula One career ==
=== Ferrari (2000–2014) ===
Stella began his career at Ferrari in 2000 as performance engineer for the test team, before becoming performance engineer for Michael Schumacher (2002–2006) and then Kimi Räikkönen (2007–2008). He moved to become race engineer for Räikkönen (2009) and Fernando Alonso (2010–2014). In 2006, he also worked as track engineer with Valentino Rossi, when the motorbike racer tested with Ferrari with the idea of a prospective move to Formula One.

=== McLaren (2015–present) ===
Stella joined McLaren in 2015 as head of race operations, moving to Performance Director in 2018 and racing director in 2019. In the latter role, he formed a triumvirate with James Key as technical director and Piers Thynne as production director, all under team principal Andreas Seidl.

On 13 December 2022, it was announced that Stella would replace Seidl as team principal of McLaren, ahead of the 2023 season. In the 2024 season, Stella led the team to its first World Constructor's Championship win since 1998.

== Personal life ==
Stella is married to Michela Di Eugenio, with whom he has two children: Edoardo and Federico.
