= 2025 Qatar Grand Prix =

Formula One motor race

Race 23 of 24 in the 2025 Formula One World Championship
← Previous race	Next race →
- Layout of the Lusail International Circuit

Race details
- Date: 30 November 2025
- Official name: Formula 1 Qatar Airways Qatar Grand Prix 2025
- Location: Lusail International Circuit; Lusail, Qatar
- Course: Permanent racing facility
- Course length: 5.419 km (3.367 miles)
- Distance: 57 laps, 308.611 km (191.762 miles)
- Weather: Clear
- Attendance: 162,972

Pole position
Driver	(Australia) Oscar Piastri	McLaren-Mercedes
- Time: 1:19.387

Fastest lap
Driver	(Australia) Oscar Piastri	McLaren-Mercedes
- Time: 1:22.996 on lap 44

Podium
First	(Netherlands) Max Verstappen	Red Bull Racing-Honda RBPT
Second	(Australia) Oscar Piastri	McLaren-Mercedes
Third	(Spain) Carlos Sainz Jr.	Williams-Mercedes

The 2025 Qatar Grand Prix (officially known as the Formula 1 Qatar Airways Qatar Grand Prix 2025) was a Formula One motor race held on 30 November 2025 at the Lusail International Circuit in Lusail, Qatar. It was the twenty-third and penultimate race of the 2025 Formula One World Championship, and the sixth and final Grand Prix weekend of the season to utilise the sprint format. Tyre supplier Pirelli elected to enforce a 25-lap limit on tyres across the weekend, similar to the limit placed at the 2023 edition of the race.

Championship leader Lando Norris (McLaren) came into the round with an opportunity to secure his maiden title, his team's first Drivers' title since 2008. Teammate Oscar Piastri (McLaren) converted pole position for the sprint to a win, and also took pole position for the main race. Max Verstappen (Red Bull) won the main race from third on the grid, followed by Piastri and Carlos Sainz Jr. (Williams), the latter becoming the first Williams driver to score multiple podiums in a season since 2015. Norris finished in second in the sprint and fourth in the Grand Prix.

The result meant that Norris maintained his lead in the Drivers' Standings. Being outscored by his championship rivals, Norris could not secure the title in this event, so he went into the final round with a points advantage of twelve and sixteen points over Verstappen and Piastri, respectively. In the Constructors' Championship, McLaren remained on top with 800 points. Mercedes retained second place in the standings with 459 points, 33 clear of Red Bull in third.

== Background ==
The event was held at the Lusail International Circuit in Lusail for the fourth time in the circuit's history, across the weekend of 28–30 November. The Grand Prix was the twenty-third round of the 2025 Formula One World Championship and the fourth running of the Qatar Grand Prix. It was also the sixth and final Grand Prix in the season to utilise the sprint format and the third time overall that the Qatar Grand Prix featured it.

=== Championship standings before the race ===
Going into the weekend, Lando Norris led the Drivers' Championship with 390 points, 24 points ahead of his teammate Oscar Piastri and Max Verstappen, who were second and third, respectively. McLaren, who won the Constructors' Championship at the Singapore Grand Prix, led with 756 points ahead of Mercedes and Red Bull Racing, who were second and third with 431 and 391 points, respectively.

==== Championship permutations ====
World Drivers' Championship leader Lando Norris had an opportunity to secure his first title at this event, and McLaren's first Drivers' title since 2008. Norris could have become World Drivers' Champion if he outscored both Piastri and Verstappen by two points over the weekend; the title could not be decided after the sprint.

=== Entrants ===
The drivers and teams were the same as published in the season entry list with two exceptions; Yuki Tsunoda at Red Bull Racing held the seat originally held by Liam Lawson before Lawson was demoted back to Racing Bulls from the Japanese Grand Prix onward, and Franco Colapinto replaced Jack Doohan at Alpine from the Emilia Romagna Grand Prix onward on a race-by-race basis. The Grand Prix marked Lando Norris' 151st race with McLaren, becoming the driver with the most races with the team.

=== Tyre choices and limits ===
Tyre supplier Pirelli brought the C1, C2, and C3 tyre compounds (the three hardest in their range) designated hard, medium, and soft, respectively, for teams to use at the event.

A limit of 25 laps over the course of the race weekend for each set of tyres was introduced. As the Grand Prix was run for 57 laps, each driver was required to change tyres at least twice. Unlike the 2023 race, laps run under the safety car or virtual safety car counted towards the limit.

=== Penalties ===
Gabriel Bortoleto (Sauber) carried a five-place grid penalty for the main race for causing a collision with Lance Stroll (Aston Martin) at the preceding Las Vegas Grand Prix.

== Practice ==
The only free practice session was held on 28 November 2025, at 16:30 local time (UTC+3), and was topped by Oscar Piastri ahead of his teammate Lando Norris (both McLaren) and Fernando Alonso (Aston Martin).

== Sprint qualifying ==
Sprint qualifying was held on 28 November 2025, at 20:30 local time (UTC+3), and determined the starting grid order for the sprint.

=== Sprint qualifying report ===
As with regular qualifying, the sprint qualifying consisted of three sessions, with the five drivers with the worst lap times being eliminated following each of the first two sessions. For the first two sessions, new medium tyres were mandated, while the third and final session allowed teams to use any set of soft tyres.

During the twelve-minute long first session (SQ1), Pierre Gasly and Franco Colapinto (both Alpine) were eliminated, in addition to Lance Stroll (Aston Martin), Liam Lawson (Racing Bulls), and Lewis Hamilton (Ferrari). The second session (SQ2), which lasted for ten minutes, saw the eliminations of Oliver Bearman and Esteban Ocon (both Haas), Gabriel Bortoleto and Nico Hülkenberg (both Sauber), and Isack Hadjar (Racing Bulls).

The third session (SQ3) lasted for eight minutes, and determined the final order of the remaining ten drivers. Oscar Piastri (McLaren) took pole position ahead of George Russell (Mercedes) in second, and Piastri's teammate Lando Norris in third. Fernando Alonso (Aston Martin) and Yuki Tsunoda (Red Bull) finished in fourth and fifth, respectively, both recording their highest starting positions of the season. Max Verstappen, who found himself behind a teammate in any competitive session for the first time since the 2024 Azerbaijan Grand Prix, Kimi Antonelli, Carlos Sainz Jr., Charles Leclerc, and Alexander Albon completed the rest of the top ten.

=== Sprint qualifying classification ===
Pos.	No.	Driver	Constructor	Qualifying times			Sprint grid
Pos.	No.	Driver	Constructor	SQ1	SQ2	SQ3	Sprint grid
1	81	(Australia) Oscar Piastri	McLaren-Mercedes	1:21.286	1:21.005	1:20.055	1
2	63	(United Kingdom) George Russell	Mercedes	1:21.432	1:21.136	1:20.087	2
3	4	(United Kingdom) Lando Norris	McLaren-Mercedes	1:21.398	1:20.956	1:20.285	3
4	14	(Spain) Fernando Alonso	Aston Martin Aramco-Mercedes	1:21.276	1:21.272	1:20.450	4
5	22	(Japan) Yuki Tsunoda	Red Bull Racing-Honda RBPT	1:21.458	1:21.152	1:20.519	5
6	1	(Netherlands) Max Verstappen	Red Bull Racing-Honda RBPT	1:21.172	1:21.036	1:20.528	6
7	12	(Italy) Kimi Antonelli	Mercedes	1:21.555	1:21.376	1:20.532	7
8	55	(Spain) Carlos Sainz Jr.	Williams-Mercedes	1:21.438	1:21.172	1:20.542	8
9	16	(Monaco) Charles Leclerc	Ferrari	1:21.636	1:21.190	1:20.622	9
10	23	(Thailand) Alexander Albon	Williams-Mercedes	1:21.721	1:21.212	1:20.788	10
11	6	(France) Isack Hadjar	Racing Bulls-Honda RBPT	1:21.399	1:21.433	N/A	11
12	87	(United Kingdom) Oliver Bearman	Haas-Ferrari	1:21.526	1:21.494	N/A	12
13	5	(Brazil) Gabriel Bortoleto	Kick Sauber-Ferrari	1:21.623	1:21.567	N/A	13
14	27	(Germany) Nico Hülkenberg	Kick Sauber-Ferrari	1:21.327	1:21.631	N/A	14
15	31	(France) Esteban Ocon	Haas-Ferrari	1:21.773	1:21.666	N/A	15
16	18	(Canada) Lance Stroll	Aston Martin Aramco-Mercedes	1:21.807	N/A	N/A	PL^{1}
17	30	(New Zealand) Liam Lawson	Racing Bulls-Honda RBPT	1:21.851	N/A	N/A	16
18	44	(United Kingdom) Lewis Hamilton	Ferrari	1:22.043	N/A	N/A	PL^{1}
19	10	(France) Pierre Gasly	Alpine-Renault	1:22.112	N/A	N/A	PL^{1}
20	43	(Argentina) Franco Colapinto	Alpine-Renault	1:22.364	N/A	N/A	PL^{1}
107% time: 1:26.854

Notes

- ^1 – Lance Stroll, Lewis Hamilton, Pierre Gasly and Franco Colapinto qualified 16th, 18th, 19th and 20th, respectively, but were required to start the sprint from the pit lane as their cars were modified under parc fermé conditions.

== Sprint ==
The sprint was held on 29 November 2025, at 17:00 local time (UTC+3), and was run for 19 laps.

=== Sprint classification ===
Pos.	No.	Driver	Constructor	Laps	Time/Retired	Grid	Points
1	81	(Australia) Oscar Piastri	McLaren-Mercedes	19	26:51.033	1	8
2	63	(United Kingdom) George Russell	Mercedes	19	+4.951	2	7
3	4	(United Kingdom) Lando Norris	McLaren-Mercedes	19	+6.279	3	6
4	1	(Netherlands) Max Verstappen	Red Bull Racing-Honda RBPT	19	+9.054	6	5
5	22	(Japan) Yuki Tsunoda	Red Bull Racing-Honda RBPT	19	+19.327^{1}	5	4
6	12	(Italy) Kimi Antonelli	Mercedes	19	+21.391^{1}	7	3
7	14	(Spain) Fernando Alonso	Aston Martin Aramco-Mercedes	19	+24.556	4	2
8	55	(Spain) Carlos Sainz Jr.	Williams-Mercedes	19	+27.333	8	1
9	6	(France) Isack Hadjar	Racing Bulls-Honda RBPT	19	+28.206	11	
10	23	(Thailand) Alexander Albon	Williams-Mercedes	19	+28.925	10	
11	5	(Brazil) Gabriel Bortoleto	Kick Sauber-Ferrari	19	+32.966	13	
12	87	(United Kingdom) Oliver Bearman	Haas-Ferrari	19	+34.529	12	
13	16	(Monaco) Charles Leclerc	Ferrari	19	+35.182	9	
14	30	(New Zealand) Liam Lawson	Racing Bulls-Honda RBPT	19	+36.916	16	
15	31	(France) Esteban Ocon	Haas-Ferrari	19	+38.838	15	
16	27	(Germany) Nico Hülkenberg	Kick Sauber-Ferrari	19	+39.638	14	
17	44	(United Kingdom) Lewis Hamilton	Ferrari	19	+46.171	PL	
18	10	(France) Pierre Gasly	Alpine-Renault	19	+1:09.534	PL	
19	18	(Canada) Lance Stroll	Aston Martin Aramco-Mercedes	19	+1:17.960	PL	
20	43	(Argentina) Franco Colapinto	Alpine-Renault	19	+1:20.804	PL	

Notes

- ^1 – Yuki Tsunoda and Kimi Antonelli received a five-second time penalty for exceeding track limits. Their final positions were not affected by the penalty.

== Qualifying ==
Qualifying was held on 29 November 2025, at 21:00 local time (UTC+3), and determined the starting grid order for the main race.

=== Qualifying classification ===
Pos.	No.	Driver	Constructor	Qualifying times			Final grid
Pos.	No.	Driver	Constructor	Q1	Q2	Q3	Final grid
1	81	(Australia) Oscar Piastri	McLaren-Mercedes	1:20.234	1:19.650	1:19.387	1
2	4	(United Kingdom) Lando Norris	McLaren-Mercedes	1:20.157	1:19.861	1:19.495	2
3	1	(Netherlands) Max Verstappen	Red Bull Racing-Honda RBPT	1:20.472	1:19.985	1:19.651	3
4	63	(United Kingdom) George Russell	Mercedes	1:20.074	1:20.186	1:19.662	4
5	12	(Italy) Kimi Antonelli	Mercedes	1:20.576	1:20.084	1:19.846	5
6	6	(France) Isack Hadjar	Racing Bulls-Honda RBPT	1:20.603	1:20.350	1:20.114	6
7	55	(Spain) Carlos Sainz Jr.	Williams-Mercedes	1:20.520	1:20.251	1:20.287	7
8	14	(Spain) Fernando Alonso	Aston Martin Aramco-Mercedes	1:20.598	1:20.219	1:20.418	8
9	10	(France) Pierre Gasly	Alpine-Renault	1:20.681	1:20.324	1:20.477	9
10	16	(Monaco) Charles Leclerc	Ferrari	1:20.564	1:20.343	1:20.561	10
11	27	(Germany) Nico Hülkenberg	Kick Sauber-Ferrari	1:20.630	1:20.353	N/A	11
12	30	(New Zealand) Liam Lawson	Racing Bulls-Honda RBPT	1:20.539	1:20.433	N/A	12
13	87	(United Kingdom) Oliver Bearman	Haas-Ferrari	1:20.548	1:20.438	N/A	13
14	5	(Brazil) Gabriel Bortoleto	Kick Sauber-Ferrari	1:20.653	1:20.534	N/A	19^{1}
15	23	(Thailand) Alexander Albon	Williams-Mercedes	1:20.629	1:20.629	N/A	14
16	22	(Japan) Yuki Tsunoda	Red Bull Racing-Honda RBPT	1:20.761	N/A	N/A	15
17	31	(France) Esteban Ocon	Haas-Ferrari	1:20.864	N/A	N/A	16
18	44	(United Kingdom) Lewis Hamilton	Ferrari	1:20.907	N/A	N/A	17
19	18	(Canada) Lance Stroll	Aston Martin Aramco-Mercedes	1:21.058	N/A	N/A	18
20	43	(Argentina) Franco Colapinto	Alpine-Renault	1:21.137	N/A	N/A	PL^{2}
107% time: 1:25.679

Notes

- ^1 – Gabriel Bortoleto received a five-place grid penalty for causing a collision with Lance Stroll at the preceding Las Vegas Grand Prix.
- ^2 – Franco Colapinto qualified 20th, but was required to start the race from the pit lane as his car was modified under parc fermé conditions.

== Race ==
The race was held on 30 November 2025, at 19:00 local time (UTC+3), and was run for 57 laps.

=== Race report ===
Both McLarens started on the front row, with polesitter Oscar Piastri having a good start to cover his teammate Lando Norris going into turn 1. Max Verstappen, who started third, immediately overtook Norris in the first turn. Both George Russell and Isack Hadjar had poor starts and dropped to seventh and eighth, respectively, with Kimi Antonelli, Carlos Sainz Jr. and Fernando Alonso taking over fourth, fifth and sixth. Several drivers were caught with black and white flag for exceeding track limits, including Pierre Gasly who went off track, damaging his Alpine. Nico Hülkenberg attempted to overtake Gasly around the outside of turn 1 on lap 7. Gasly ran into the side of Hülkenberg, causing Hülkenberg to lose his right rear tyre, suffering a tyre puncture on his own and triggering a safety car intervention. With the safety car deployed, every car bar the McLarens and Esteban Ocon made their first pit stops immediately, with Ocon pitting a lap later. The timing of this first pit stop would force these sixteen drivers to pit on lap 32 if they intended to run a two-stop strategy, as the tyres were only allowed to run for a maximum of 25 laps.

During the first pit stop, a slow stop for Antonelli caused himself and teammate Russell to lose track positions to Sainz and Hadjar, respectively. Ocon received a five-second time penalty for jumping the race start, and had to serve the penalty in the following lap. The three championship contenders (Piastri, Norris and Verstappen) all lined up in the top three in that order as of lap 11 when the safety car ended, with Verstappen being advised to nurse his tyres before Piastri and Norris took their first pit stops in lap 24 and 25, respectively, and maintained his gap to Norris.

On lap 41, Alonso spun at the exit of turn 10, losing two positions to Hadjar and Russell. One lap later, McLaren decided to pit Piastri, putting the hard-compound tyres instead of the predicted soft tyres due to high degradation, followed by Norris two laps after that. Piastri rejoined the race in second behind Verstappen, while Norris rejoined in fifth behind Sainz and Antonelli. Near the end of the race, Lance Stroll and Hadjar retired, with the latter suffering a puncture. On the penultimate lap, Antonelli went wide at turn 10 while defending Norris, and Norris passed him to take fourth place. Sainz, having suffered floor damage that caused him to lose lap time, managed to fend off Antonelli and Norris. Verstappen won the Grand Prix, his 70th overall and seventh of the season, equaling the race win tally of Norris and Piastri in 2025. Piastri came in second place and Sainz rounded the podium, his second of the season with Williams after the Azerbaijan Grand Prix.

=== Post-race ===
McLaren admitted they made the wrong decision regarding their strategy to not pit their drivers under the safety car. Following the Grand Prix, Norris retained his Drivers' Championship lead with 408 points. Being outscored by his championship rivals, Norris could not secure the title in this event, so he went into the final round with a points advantage of twelve and sixteen points over Verstappen and Piastri, respectively. Verstappen's victory saw him move to second in the championship with Piastri dropping to third. In the Constructors' Championship, McLaren remained on top with 800 points. Mercedes retained second place in the standings with 459 points, 33 clear of Red Bull in third. Mercedes would only need eleven points at the final race in Abu Dhabi to secure second in the Constructors' Championship. Williams secured their position in fifth place with 137 points, their best finish since 2016, ahead of Racing Bulls with 92 points in sixth. Meanwhile, Ferrari and Alpine also ensured their positions in the Constructors' Championship in fourth and tenth, respectively.

=== Race classification ===
Pos.	No.	Driver	Constructor	Laps	Time/Retired	Grid	Points
1	1	(Netherlands) Max Verstappen	Red Bull Racing-Honda RBPT	57	1:24:38.241	3	25
2	81	(Australia) Oscar Piastri	McLaren-Mercedes	57	+7.995	1	18
3	55	(Spain) Carlos Sainz Jr.	Williams-Mercedes	57	+22.665	7	15
4	4	(United Kingdom) Lando Norris	McLaren-Mercedes	57	+23.315	2	12
5	12	(Italy) Kimi Antonelli	Mercedes	57	+28.317	5	10
6	63	(United Kingdom) George Russell	Mercedes	57	+48.599	4	8
7	14	(Spain) Fernando Alonso	Aston Martin Aramco-Mercedes	57	+54.045	8	6
8	16	(Monaco) Charles Leclerc	Ferrari	57	+56.785	10	4
9	30	(New Zealand) Liam Lawson	Racing Bulls-Honda RBPT	57	+1:00.073	12	2
10	22	(Japan) Yuki Tsunoda	Red Bull Racing-Honda RBPT	57	+1:01.770	15	1
11	23	(Thailand) Alexander Albon	Williams-Mercedes	57	+1:06.931	14	
12	44	(United Kingdom) Lewis Hamilton	Ferrari	57	+1:17.730	17	
13	5	(Brazil) Gabriel Bortoleto	Kick Sauber-Ferrari	57	+1:24.812	19	
14	43	(Argentina) Franco Colapinto	Alpine-Renault	56	+1 lap	PL	
15	31	(France) Esteban Ocon	Haas-Ferrari	56	+1 lap	16	
16	10	(France) Pierre Gasly	Alpine-Renault	56	+1 lap	9	
17^{1}	18	(Canada) Lance Stroll	Aston Martin Aramco-Mercedes	55	Puncture	18	
18^{1}	6	(France) Isack Hadjar	Racing Bulls-Honda RBPT	55	Puncture	6	
Ret	87	(United Kingdom) Oliver Bearman	Haas-Ferrari	41	Pit stop issue	13	
Ret	27	(Germany) Nico Hülkenberg	Kick Sauber-Ferrari	6	Collision	11	

Notes

- ^1 – Lance Stroll and Isack Hadjar were classified as they completed more than 90% of the race distance.

== Championship standings after the race ==
Drivers' Championship standings

	Pos.	Driver	Points
	1	(United Kingdom) **Lando Norris***	408
1	2	(Netherlands) **Max Verstappen***	396
1	3	(Australia) **Oscar Piastri***	392
	4	(United Kingdom) George Russell	309
	5	(Monaco) Charles Leclerc	230

Constructors' Championship standings

Pos.	Constructor	Points
1	(United Kingdom) **McLaren-Mercedes***	800
2	(Germany) Mercedes	459
3	(Austria) Red Bull Racing-Honda RBPT	426
4	(Italy) Ferrari	382
5	(United Kingdom) Williams-Mercedes	137

- Note: Only the top five positions are included for both sets of standings.
- Competitor marked in bold and with an asterisk still has a theoretical chance of becoming World Champion.

== See also ==
- 2025 Lusail Formula 2 round

Previous race: 2025 Las Vegas Grand Prix	FIA Formula One World Championship; 2025 season	Next race: 2025 Abu Dhabi Grand Prix
Previous race: 2024 Qatar Grand Prix	Qatar Grand Prix	Next race: 2026 Qatar Grand Prix
