= Lusail International Circuit =

Motorsport track in Qatar

- Grand Prix Circuit (2023–present)
- Location: Lusail, Al Daayen, Qatar
- Coordinates: 25°29′24″N 51°27′15″E
- Capacity: 52,000
- FIA Grade: 1
- Broke ground: 2003
- Opened: 30 September 2004; 22 years ago
- Construction cost: US$58 million
- Architect: Hermann Tilke
- Major events: Current: Formula One; Qatar Grand Prix (2021, 2023–present); Grand Prix motorcycle racing Qatar motorcycle Grand Prix (2004–present); FIA World Endurance Championship; Qatar 1812 km (2024–2025, 2027); Former: World SBK (2005–2009, 2014–2019); WTCC Race of Qatar (2015–2017); Motocross World Championship (2013–2017); FIM EWC 8 Hours of Doha (2007–2012); GP2 Asia (2009); Grand Prix motorcycle racing Doha motorcycle Grand Prix (2021)
- Website: https://www.lcsc.qa/

Grand Prix Circuit (2023–present)
- Length: 5.419 km (3.367 mi)
- Turns: 16
- Race lap record: 1:22.384 ( (United Kingdom) Lando Norris, McLaren MCL38, 2024, F1)

Short Circuit (2023–present)
- Length: 3.701 km (2.300 mi)
- Turns: 11

Club Circuit (2023–present)
- Length: 2.446 km (1.520 mi)
- Turns: 12

Original Grand Prix Circuit (2004–2022)
- Length: 5.380 km (3.343 mi)
- Turns: 16
- Race lap record: 1:23.196 ( (Netherlands) Max Verstappen, Red Bull Racing RB16B, 2021, F1)

The Lusail International Circuit (Arabic: حلبة لوسيل الدولية, sometimes rendered Losail International Circuit) is a motor racing circuit located just outside the city of Lusail, north of Doha, Qatar. The track is 5.419 km (3.367 mi) in length, with a main straight of 1.068 km (0.664 mi). The circuit has an FIA Grade 1 license. It is surrounded by artificial grass intended to stop the sand encroaching on the track.

== History ==
Built in just under a year by 1,000 workers at the cost of US$58 million, the track opened in 2004 and hosted the inaugural Qatar motorcycle Grand Prix in the same year, won by Sete Gibernau. In 2007, Lusail added permanent outdoor lighting for night races. At the time, the lighting of the Lusail Circuit by Musco Lighting was the largest permanent venue sports lighting project in the world, a distinction that now belongs to another Persian Gulf motorsport venue, Yas Marina Circuit in Abu Dhabi. The first night race in MotoGP history was the 2008 Qatar motorcycle Grand Prix in March 2008.

In February 2009, a GP2 Asia Series nighttime race took place. The World SBK visited Lusail in 2005–2009 and 2014–2019; and the WTCC visited there in 2015–2017.

The circuit hosted the 20th race of the 2021 Formula One season, the inaugural edition of the Qatar Grand Prix. Before the second edition of the Grand Prix, the circuit was renovated, the facilities upgraded, and the capacity was increased from 8,000 to 52,000.

Beginning in 2024, the FIA World Endurance Championship hosted its season opener at Lusail, the Qatar 1812 km, in addition to the Prologue, the championship's pre-season testing sessions.

== Layout history ==
Lusail International Circuit layout history
Original Grand Prix Circuit (2004–2022)

Grand Prix Circuit (2023–present)

== Events ==
Current

- February: Formula Regional Middle East Trophy, UAE4 Series, Ferrari Challenge Middle East Prologue
- November: Formula One Qatar Grand Prix, FIA Formula 2 Championship, Grand Prix motorcycle racing Qatar motorcycle Grand Prix, Porsche Carrera Cup Middle East, Moto4 Asia Cup
- December: F4 Saudi Arabian Championship

Future

- Ferrari Challenge Middle East (2027)
- FIA World Endurance Championship
  - Qatar 1812 km (2024–2025, 2027)

Former

- Asia Road Racing Championship (2010–2015)
- Classic Endurance Racing (2024–2025)
- F1 Academy (2024)
- FIM Endurance World Championship
  - 8 Hours of Doha (2007–2012)
- GP2 Asia Series (2009)
- Grand Prix Masters (2006)
- Grand Prix motorcycle racing
  - Doha motorcycle Grand Prix (2021)
- Motocross World Championship (2013–2017)
- MRF Challenge Formula 2000 Championship (2014)
- Porsche GT3 Middle East Championship (2012–2015)
- Speedcar Series (2009)
- Superbike World Championship (2005–2009, 2014–2019)
- Supersport World Championship (2005–2009, 2014–2019)
- Supersport 300 World Championship (2019)
- World Touring Car Championship
  - FIA WTCC Race of Qatar (2015–2017)

== Lap records ==
The official lap record for the current circuit layout is 1:22.384, set by Lando Norris driving for McLaren in the 2024 Qatar Grand Prix. The fastest qualifying lap was 1:19.387, set by Oscar Piastri driving for McLaren in the 2025 Qatar Grand Prix. As of November 2026, the fastest official race lap records at the Lusail International Circuit are listed as:

Category	Time	Driver	Vehicle	Event
Grand Prix Circuit (2023–present): 5.419 km (3.367 mi)
Formula One	1:22.384	Lando Norris	McLaren MCL38	2024 Qatar Grand Prix
FIA F2	1:37.997	Oliver Bearman	Dallara F2 2024	2024 Lusail Formula 2 round
LMDh	1:39.748	Matt Campbell	Porsche 963	2024 Qatar 1812 km
LMH	1:41.259	Alessandro Pier Guidi	Ferrari 499P	2025 Qatar 1812 km
Formula Regional	1:48.180	Emanuele Olivieri	Tatuus T-326	2026 Lusail Formula Regional Middle East round
MotoGP	1:52.558	Marc Márquez	Ducati Desmosedici GP26	2026 Qatar motorcycle Grand Prix
GT3	1:53.529	Alessio Rovera	Ferrari 296 GT3	2024 Qatar 1812 km
Formula 4	1:54.996	Doriane Pin	Tatuus F4-T421	2024 Lusail F1 Academy round
Moto2	1:56.488	Iván Ortolá	Kalex Moto2	2026 Qatar motorcycle Grand Prix
Ferrari Challenge	1:56.741	Fouad Alghanim	Ferrari 296 Challenge	2026 Ferrari Challenge Middle East Prologue
Porsche Carrera Cup	1:58.024	Caleb Sumich	Porsche 911 (992 I) GT3 Cup	2025 Lusail Porsche Carrera Cup Middle East round
Superbike	2:00.218	Saeed Al Sulaiti	BMW M1000RR	2026 2nd Lusail QPSC round
Supersport	2:02.617	David Munoz Rodriguez	Yamaha YZF-R6	2025 1st Lusail QSTK 600 round
Moto3	2:03.135	Tatsuki Suzuki	Husqvarna FR250GP	2024 Qatar motorcycle Grand Prix
Supersport 300	2:16.725	Nolann Macary	Kawasaki Ninja 300	2026 1st Lusail QSSP 300 round
Touring car racing	2:19.360	Ghanim Al Madheed	Lotus Elise	2024 5th Lusail QTCC round
Original Grand Prix Circuit (2004–2022): 5.380 km (3.343 mi)
Formula One	1:23.196	Max Verstappen	Red Bull Racing RB16B	2021 Qatar Grand Prix
GP2 Asia	1:38.699	Davide Rigon	Dallara GP2/05	2009 Qatar GP2 Asia Series round
GP Masters	1:49.116	Pierluigi Martini	Delta Motorsport GP Masters car	2006 Losail Grand Prix Masters
MotoGP	1:54.338	Enea Bastianini	Ducati Desmosedici GP21	2022 Qatar motorcycle Grand Prix
World SBK	1:56.687	Jonathan Rea	Kawasaki Ninja ZX-10RR	2019 Lusail World SBK round
Moto2	1:58.711	Thomas Lüthi	Kalex Moto2	2019 Qatar motorcycle Grand Prix
250cc	1:59.379	Alex Debón	Aprilia RSV 250	2008 Qatar motorcycle Grand Prix
MRF Challenge	1:59.519	Toby Sowery	Dallara Formulino Pro	2014 Lusail MRF Challenge round
Porsche Carrera Cup	2:00.322	Clemens Schmid	Porsche 911 (991 I) GT3 Cup	2015 2nd Lusail Porsche GT3 Middle East Championship round
TC1	2:01.628	José María López	Citroën C-Elysée WTCC	2015 FIA WTCC Race of Qatar
World SSP	2:01.832	Kenan Sofuoğlu	Kawasaki Ninja ZX-6R	2017 Lusail World SSP round
Stock car racing	2:04.508	Vitantonio Liuzzi	Speedcar V8	2009 Lusail Speedcar Series round
Moto3	2:05.403	Romano Fenati	Honda NSF250RW	2019 Qatar motorcycle Grand Prix
125cc	2:05.695	Scott Redding	Aprilia RS125R	2008 Qatar motorcycle Grand Prix
Supersport 300	2:13.798	Ana Carrasco	Kawasaki Ninja 400	2019 Lusail Supersport 300 round
Asia Productions 250	2:24.177	Kasma Daniel Kasmayudin	Yamaha YZF-R25	2015 Lusail ARRC round
Asia Underbone 130	2:31.934	Ferlando Herdian	Yamaha T-150	2014 Lusail ARRC round

== Racing history ==
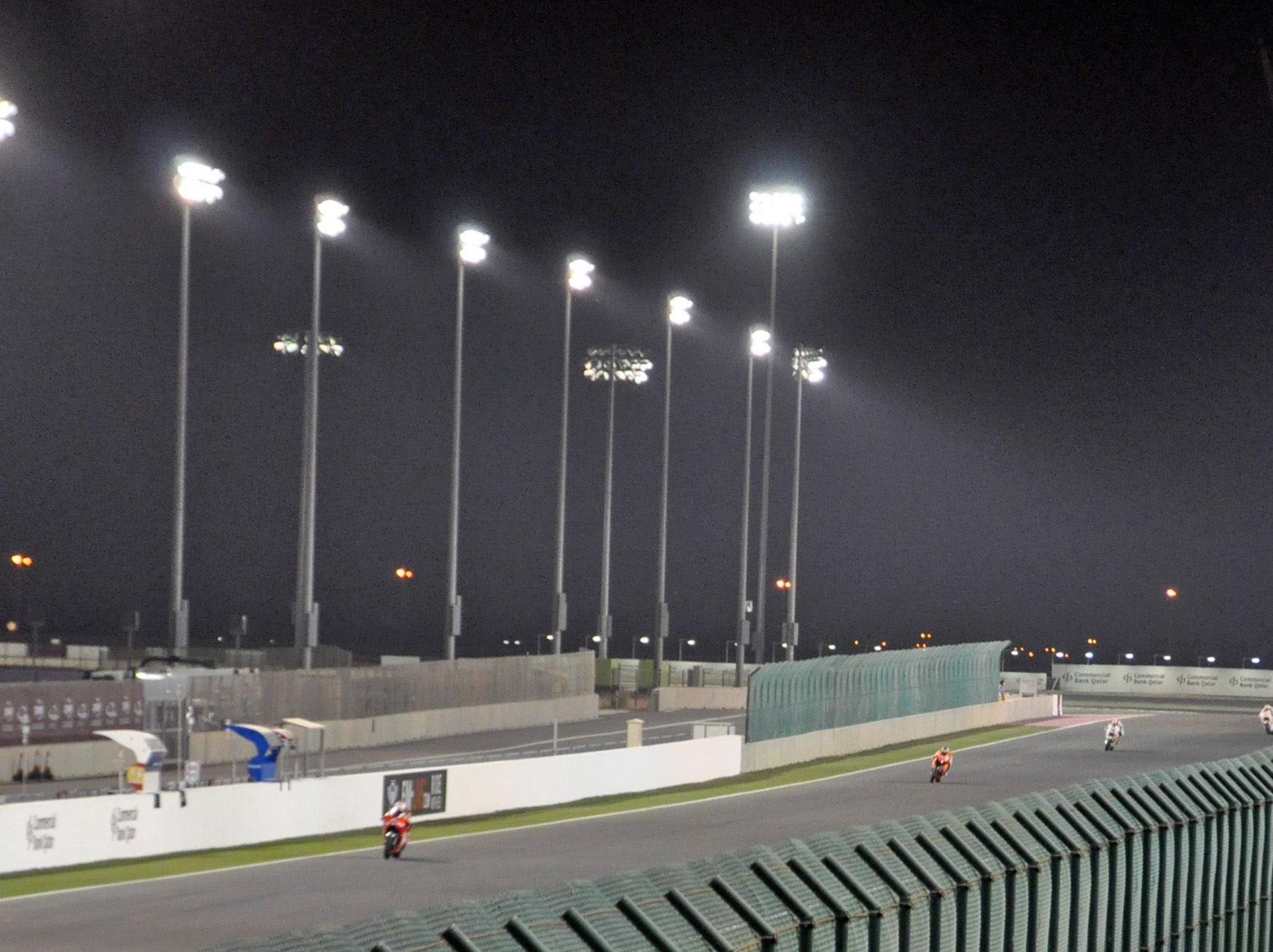
Since 2008, MotoGP class has run under lights at Losail

=== Formula One ===
Year	Winning driver	Winning team
2021	(United Kingdom) Lewis Hamilton	(Germany) Mercedes
2023	(Netherlands) Max Verstappen	(Austria) Red Bull Racing
2024	(Netherlands) Max Verstappen	(Austria) Red Bull Racing
2025	(Netherlands) Max Verstappen	(Austria) Red Bull Racing

=== MotoGP ===
Year	MotoGP	250cc/Moto2	125cc/Moto3
2004	(Spain) Sete Gibernau	(Argentina) Sebastián Porto	(Spain) Jorge Lorenzo
2005	(Italy) Valentino Rossi	(Australia) Casey Stoner	(Hungary) Gábor Talmácsi
2006	(Italy) Valentino Rossi	(Spain) Jorge Lorenzo	(Spain) Álvaro Bautista
2007	(Australia) Casey Stoner	(Spain) Jorge Lorenzo	(Spain) Héctor Faubel
2008	(Australia) Casey Stoner	(Italy) Mattia Pasini	(Spain) Sergio Gadea
2009	(Australia) Casey Stoner	(Spain) Héctor Barberá	(Italy) Andrea Iannone
2010	(Italy) Valentino Rossi	(Japan) Shoya Tomizawa	(Spain) Nicolás Terol
2011	(Australia) Casey Stoner	(Germany) Stefan Bradl	(Spain) Nicolás Terol
2012	(Spain) Jorge Lorenzo	(Spain) Marc Márquez	(Spain) Maverick Viñales
2013	(Spain) Jorge Lorenzo	(Spain) Pol Espargaró	(Spain) Luis Salom
2014	(Spain) Marc Márquez	(Spain) Esteve Rabat	(Australia) Jack Miller
2015	(Italy) Valentino Rossi	(Germany) Jonas Folger	(France) Alexis Masbou
2016	(Spain) Jorge Lorenzo	(Switzerland) Thomas Lüthi	(Italy) Niccolò Antonelli
2017	(Spain) Maverick Viñales	(Italy) Franco Morbidelli	(Spain) Joan Mir
2018	(Italy) Andrea Dovizioso	(Italy) Francesco Bagnaia	(Spain) Jorge Martín
2019	(Italy) Andrea Dovizioso	(Italy) Lorenzo Baldassarri	(Japan) Kaito Toba
2020	Cancelled due to COVID-19 concerns	(Japan) Tetsuta Nagashima	(Spain) Albert Arenas
2021 Qatar	(Spain) Maverick Viñales	(United Kingdom) Sam Lowes	(Spain) Jaume Masià
2021 Doha	(France) Fabio Quartararo	(United Kingdom) Sam Lowes	(Spain) Pedro Acosta
2022	(Italy) Enea Bastianini	(Italy) Celestino Vietti	(Italy) Andrea Migno
2023	(Italy) Fabio Di Giannantonio	(Spain) Fermín Aldeguer	(Spain) Jaume Masià
2024	(Italy) Francesco Bagnaia	(Spain) Alonso López	(Colombia) David Alonso
2025	(Spain) Marc Márquez	(Spain) Arón Canet	(Spain) Ángel Piqueras

=== FIA World Endurance Championship ===
Year	Hypercar Winners	LMGT3 Winners
2024	(Germany) No. 6 Porsche Penske Motorsport	(Lithuania) No. 92 Manthey PureRxcing
2024	(France) Kévin Estre (Germany) André Lotterer (Belgium) Laurens Vanthoor	(Saint Kitts and Nevis) Alex Malykhin (Germany) Joel Sturm (Austria) Klaus Bachler
2025	(Italy) No. 50 Ferrari AF Corse	(United Kingdom) No. 33 TF Sport
2025	(Italy) Antonio Fuoco (Spain) Miguel Molina (Denmark) Nicklas Nielsen	(United Kingdom) Jonny Edgar (Spain) Daniel Juncadella (United States) Ben Keating

=== Superbike World Championship ===
Year	Race	Winning rider	Winning team
2005	Race 1	(Australia) Troy Corser	Alstare Suzuki
2005	Race 2	(Japan) Yukio Kagayama	Alstare Suzuki
2006	Race 1	(United Kingdom) James Toseland	Winston Ten Kate Honda
2006	Race 2	(Australia) Troy Corser	Alstare Suzuki Corona Extra
2007	Race 1	(Italy) Max Biaggi	Alstare Suzuki
2007	Race 2	(United Kingdom) James Toseland	Ten Kate Honda
2008	Race 1	(Australia) Troy Bayliss	Ducati Xerox Team
2008	Race 2	(Spain) Fonsi Nieto	Team Alstare Suzuki
2009	Race 1	(United States) Ben Spies	Yamaha WSB
2009	Race 2	(United States) Ben Spies	Yamaha WSB
2014	Race 1	(France) Sylvain Guintoli	Aprilia Racing Team
2014	Race 2	(France) Sylvain Guintoli	Aprilia Racing Team
2015	Race 1	(Spain) Jordi Torres	Aprilia Racing Team – Red Devils
2015	Race 2	(United Kingdom) Leon Haslam	Aprilia Racing Team – Red Devils
2016	Race 1	(United Kingdom) Chaz Davies	Aruba.it Racing – Ducati
2016	Race 2	(United Kingdom) Chaz Davies	Aruba.it Racing – Ducati
2017	Race 1	(United Kingdom) Jonathan Rea	Kawasaki Racing Team
2017	Race 2	(United Kingdom) Jonathan Rea	Kawasaki Racing Team
2018	Race 1	(United Kingdom) Jonathan Rea	Kawasaki Racing Team WorldSBK
2018	Race 2	Race cancelled	
2019	Race 1	(United Kingdom) Jonathan Rea	Kawasaki Racing Team WorldSBK
2019	SR	(United Kingdom) Jonathan Rea	Kawasaki Racing Team WorldSBK
2019	Race 2	(United Kingdom) Jonathan Rea	Kawasaki Racing Team WorldSBK
2020	Race cancelled		

=== World Touring Car Championship ===
Year	Race	Winning driver	Winning team
2015	Race 1	(Argentina) José María López	(France) Citroën Total WTCC
2015	Race 2	(France) Yvan Muller	(France) Citroën Total WTCC
2016	Race 1	(Italy) Gabriele Tarquini	(Russia) Lada Sport Rosneft
2016	Race 2	(Morocco) Mehdi Bennani	(France) Sébastien Loeb Racing
2017	Race 1	(United Kingdom) Tom Chilton	(France) Sébastien Loeb Racing
2017	Race 2	(Argentina) Esteban Guerrieri	(Japan) Honda Racing Team JAS

=== FIM Endurance World Championship ===
Year	Manufacturer	Winning team	Winning riders
2007	(Japan) Suzuki	(France) Suzuki Endurance Racing Team	(France) Vincent Philippe (France) Matthieu Lagrive
2008	(Japan) Yamaha	Yamaha Austria Racing Team	(Slovenia) Igor Jerman (Australia) Steve Martin (United Kingdom) Steve Plater
2009	(Japan) Yamaha	Yamaha Austria Racing Team	(Slovenia) Igor Jerman (Australia) Steve Martin (France) Gwen Giabbani
2010	(Japan) Suzuki	(France) Suzuki Endurance Racing Team	(France) Vincent Philippe (France) Sylvain Guintoli; Freddy Foray
2011	(Japan) Yamaha	(France) GMT94	(Spain) David Checa (France) Kenny Foray (France) Matthieu Lagrive
2012	(Germany) BMW	(Austria) BMW Motorrad France Thevent	(France) Sebastien Gimbert (Australia) Damian Cudlin (France) Erwan Nigon

=== Motocross World Championship ===
Year	Race	MX1	MX2	
2013	Race 1	(Belgium) Clément Desalle	(Netherlands) Jeffrey Herlings	
2013	Race 2	(Italy) Tony Cairoli	(Netherlands) Jeffrey Herlings	
Year	Race	MXGP	MX2	WMX
2014	Race 1	(Germany) Maximilian Nagl	(France) Dylan Ferrandis	
2014	Race 2	(France) Gautier Paulin	(Netherlands) Jeffrey Herlings	
2015	Race 1	(Germany) Maximilian Nagl	(Netherlands) Jeffrey Herlings	
2015	Race 2	(Germany) Maximilian Nagl	(Netherlands) Jeffrey Herlings	
2016	Race 1	(Slovenia) Tim Gajser	(Netherlands) Jeffrey Herlings	(New Zealand) Courtney Duncan
2016	Race 2	(Slovenia) Tim Gajser	(Netherlands) Jeffrey Herlings	(New Zealand) Courtney Duncan
2017	Race 1	(Italy) Tony Cairoli	(Latvia) Pauls Jonass	
2017	Race 2	(Italy) Tony Cairoli	(Latvia) Pauls Jonass	

=== Speedcar Series ===
Year	Race	Winning driver	Winning team
2009	Race 1	(Italy) Gianni Morbidelli	(United States) Palm Beach
2009	Race 2	(Italy) Vitantonio Liuzzi	(United Arab Emirates) Union Properties

=== GP2 Asia ===
Year	Race	Winning driver	Winning team
2009	Race 1	(Germany) Nico Hülkenberg	(France) ART Grand Prix
2009	Race 2	(Mexico) Sergio Pérez	(Spain) Barwa International Campos
