= 2025 Abu Dhabi Grand Prix =

Formula One motor race

Race 24 of 24 in the 2025 Formula One World Championship
← Previous race
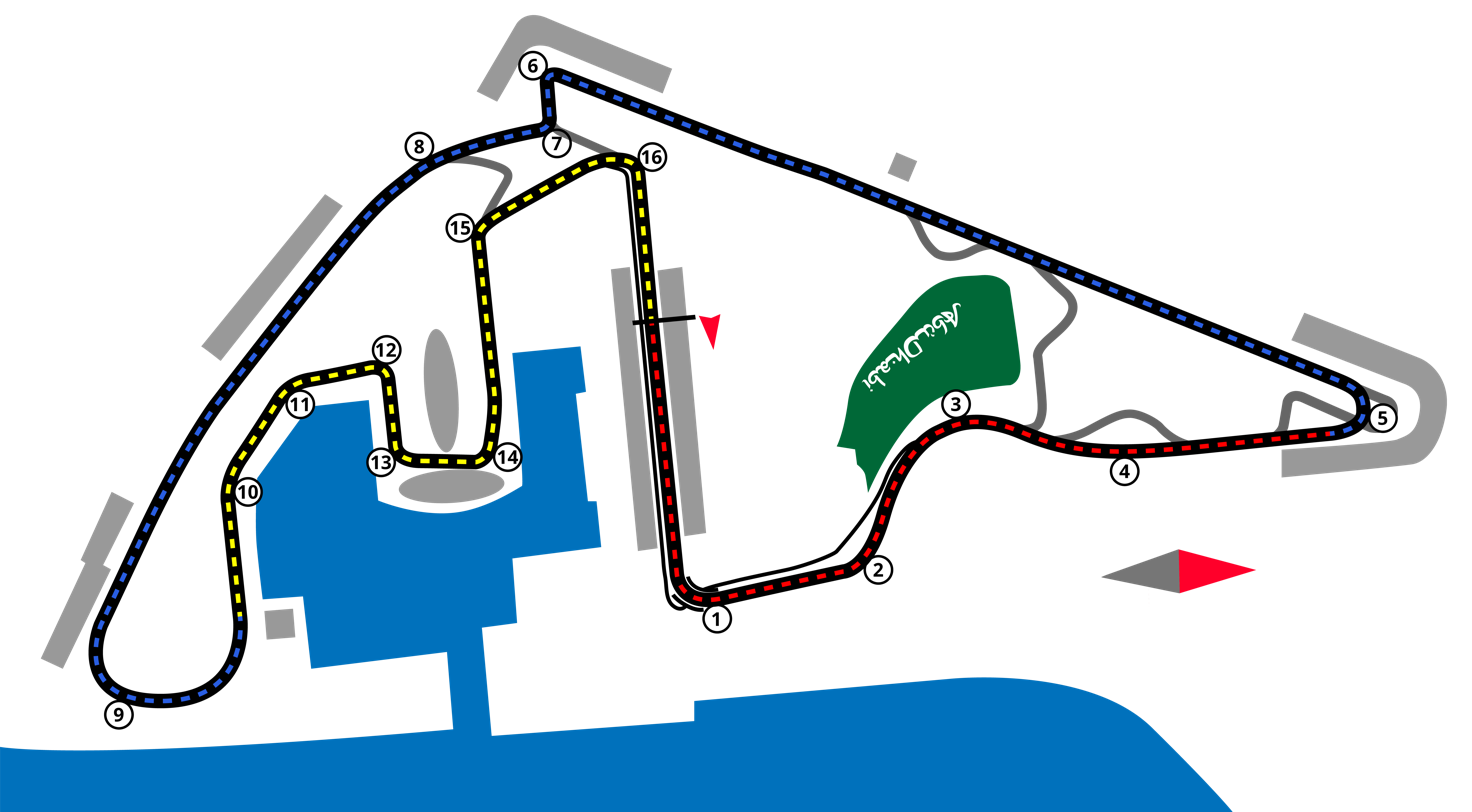
- Layout of the Yas Marina Circuit

Race details
- Date: 7 December 2025
- Official name: Formula 1 Etihad Airways Abu Dhabi Grand Prix 2025
- Location: Yas Marina Circuit; Abu Dhabi, United Arab Emirates
- Course: Permanent racing facility
- Course length: 5.281 km (3.281 miles)
- Distance: 58 laps, 306.183 km (190.253 miles)
- Weather: Clear
- Attendance: 203,000

Pole position
Driver	(Netherlands) Max Verstappen	Red Bull Racing-Honda RBPT
- Time: 1:22.207

Fastest lap
Driver	(Monaco) Charles Leclerc	Ferrari
- Time: 1:26.725 on lap 45

Podium
First	(Netherlands) Max Verstappen	Red Bull Racing-Honda RBPT
Second	(Australia) Oscar Piastri	McLaren-Mercedes
Third	(United Kingdom) Lando Norris	McLaren-Mercedes

The 2025 Abu Dhabi Grand Prix (officially known as the Formula 1 Etihad Airways Abu Dhabi Grand Prix 2025) was a Formula One motor race that was held on 7 December 2025 at the Yas Marina Circuit in Abu Dhabi, United Arab Emirates. It was the twenty-fourth and final race of the 2025 Formula One World Championship.

The Grand Prix was the first World Drivers' Championship–deciding final round since 2021, and the first with more than two contenders since 2010. Lando Norris led the championship with 408 points, ahead of Max Verstappen with 396 points, and teammate Oscar Piastri with 392 points. The three drivers entered the round with an opportunity to win the World Drivers' Championship. Verstappen converted his pole position to a victory, ahead of Piastri and Norris. Third place was enough for Norris to become World Champion, ending the season two points ahead of Verstappen and 13 ahead of Piastri. The race was Verstappen and Red Bull's last win until the 2026 Bahrain Grand Prix in Malaysia, their longest winless streak since 2017.

== Background ==
The event was held at the Yas Marina Circuit in Abu Dhabi for the 17th time in the circuit's history, across the weekend of 5–7 December. The Grand Prix was the twenty-fourth and final race of the 2025 Formula One World Championship and the 17th running of the Abu Dhabi Grand Prix.

This was the last Grand Prix to utilise the power unit configuration introduced in 2014. A revised configuration without the Motor Generator Unit-Heat (MGU-H), but with a higher power output from the Motor Generator Unit-Kinetic (MGU-K), were introduced for 2026. The event marked the final race of the ground-effect generation of cars introduced in 2022, and the last usage of the drag reduction system (DRS) introduced as an overtaking aid in 2011, as it was replaced with active aerodynamics and moveable wings, and the elimination of ground effect, the following year. This race marked Honda's last race as a power unit supplier to Red Bull and Racing Bulls, with the company exclusively supplying Aston Martin in 2026. It was also Renault's final race as an engine supplier for its team Alpine, with the manufacturer discontinuing engine production post-2025; as such Alpine became a customer of Mercedes engines from 2026.

=== Championship standings before the race ===
Going into the weekend, Lando Norris led the Drivers' Championship with 408 points, 12 points ahead of Max Verstappen and 16 ahead of his teammate Oscar Piastri, who were second and third, respectively. McLaren, who won the Constructors' Championship at the Singapore Grand Prix, leads with 800 points ahead of Mercedes and Red Bull Racing, who were second and third with 459 and 426 points, respectively.

==== Championship permutations ====
With Norris being outscored by Verstappen and Piastri in the preceding Qatar Grand Prix, he was unable to secure the Drivers' Championship. As such, it was decided in this race, marking the first time the final round of the season was a championship decider since 2021, and also the first time more than two drivers were contenders for the title at the last event since 2010. Norris and Piastri both had an opportunity to win their first title at this event, and McLaren's first Drivers' Championship since 2008, while Verstappen had an opportunity to win his fifth in a row.

Norris had an opportunity to become Britain's first Drivers' Champion since Lewis Hamilton won in 2020 for Mercedes; Verstappen could break Sebastian Vettel's record for the most championships won with Red Bull, and would have become the second driver to win five titles in a row after Michael Schumacher from 2000 to 2004 for Ferrari; and Piastri could have become Australia's first Drivers' Champion since Alan Jones won in 1980 for Williams.

The top three drivers had an opportunity to win the championship in the following manners:

	Lando Norris would have won if:		
	(United Kingdom) Lando Norris	(Netherlands) Max Verstappen	(Australia) Oscar Piastri
Pos.	3rd or better	Any place	Any place
Pos.	4th or 5th	2nd or lower	Any place
Pos.	6th or 7th	2nd or lower	2nd or lower
Pos.	8th	3rd or lower	2nd or lower
Pos.	9th or lower	4th or lower	3rd or lower
	Max Verstappen would have won if:		
	(Netherlands) Max Verstappen	(United Kingdom) Lando Norris	(Australia) Oscar Piastri
Pos.	1st	4th or lower	Any place
Pos.	2nd	8th or lower	Any place
Pos.	3rd	9th or lower	2nd or lower
	Oscar Piastri would have won if:		
	(Australia) Oscar Piastri	(United Kingdom) Lando Norris	(Netherlands) Max Verstappen
Pos.	1st	6th or lower	Any place
Pos.	2nd	10th or lower	4th or lower

=== Entrants ===
The drivers and teams were the same as published in the season entry list with two exceptions; Yuki Tsunoda at Red Bull Racing held the seat originally held by Liam Lawson before Lawson was demoted back to Racing Bulls from the Japanese Grand Prix onward, and Franco Colapinto replaced Jack Doohan at Alpine from the Emilia Romagna Grand Prix onward on a race-by-race basis.

During the first practice session, eight teams fielded alternate drivers who had not raced in more than two Grands Prix, as required by the Formula One regulations:

- Jak Crawford and Cian Shields for Aston Martin in place of Lance Stroll and Fernando Alonso, respectively. Shields made his Formula One practice debut.
- Paul Aron for Alpine in place of Pierre Gasly.
- Ayumu Iwasa for Racing Bulls in place of Liam Lawson.
- Ryō Hirakawa for Haas in place of Esteban Ocon.
- Luke Browning for Williams in place of Alexander Albon.
- Arvid Lindblad for Red Bull in place of Yuki Tsunoda.
- Patricio O'Ward for McLaren in place of Oscar Piastri.
- Arthur Leclerc for Ferrari in place of Lewis Hamilton.

The Grand Prix marked Nico Hülkenberg's 250th race start, and Charles Leclerc's 150th race start with Ferrari. The Grand Prix was Tsunoda's last as a Red Bull driver and the last Grand Prix to feature the Sauber team before they become Audi in 2026.

=== Tyre choices ===
Tyre supplier Pirelli brought the C3, C4, and C5 tyre compounds designated hard, medium, and soft, respectively, for teams to use at the event.

== Practice ==
Three free practice sessions were held for the event. The first free practice session was held on 5 December 2025, at 13:30 local time (UTC+4), and was topped by Lando Norris, followed by Max Verstappen and Charles Leclerc. The second free practice session was held on the same day, at 17:00 local time, and was topped by Norris, followed by Verstappen and George Russell. The third practice session was held on 6 December 2025, at 14:30 local time, and was topped by Russell, followed by Norris and Verstappen. The session was red-flagged after Lewis Hamilton crashed at turn 9.

== Qualifying ==
Qualifying was held on 6 December 2025, at 18:00 local time (UTC+4), and determined the starting grid order for the race.

=== Qualifying report ===
Lewis Hamilton, Alexander Albon, Nico Hülkenberg, Pierre Gasly, and Franco Colapinto were eliminated in Q1. Oliver Bearman, Carlos Sainz Jr., Liam Lawson, Kimi Antonelli, and Lance Stroll exited in Q2. In the third session (Q3), Max Verstappen claimed his 48th career pole position, ahead of title contenders Lando Norris, who qualified in second, and Oscar Piastri in third. George Russell and Charles Leclerc qualified in fourth and fifth, respectively, and Fernando Alonso, Gabriel Bortoleto, Esteban Ocon, Isack Hadjar, and Yuki Tsunoda completed the top ten. Tsunoda, who suffered floor damage from a free practice incident with Kimi Antonelli, sacrificed his flying lap in Q3 to provide a tow for teammate Verstappen.

=== Qualifying classification ===
Pos.	No.	Driver	Constructor	Qualifying times			Final grid
Pos.	No.	Driver	Constructor	Q1	Q2	Q3	Final grid
1	1	(Netherlands) Max Verstappen	Red Bull Racing-Honda RBPT	1:22.877	1:22.752	1:22.207	1
2	4	(United Kingdom) Lando Norris	McLaren-Mercedes	1:23.178	1:22.804	1:22.408	2
3	81	(Australia) Oscar Piastri	McLaren-Mercedes	1:22.605	1:23.021	1:22.437	3
4	63	(United Kingdom) George Russell	Mercedes	1:23.247	1:22.730	1:22.645	4
5	16	(Monaco) Charles Leclerc	Ferrari	1:23.163	1:22.948	1:22.730	5
6	14	(Spain) Fernando Alonso	Aston Martin Aramco-Mercedes	1:23.071	1:22.861	1:22.902	6
7	5	(Brazil) Gabriel Bortoleto	Kick Sauber-Ferrari	1:23.374	1:22.874	1:22.904	7
8	31	(France) Esteban Ocon	Haas-Ferrari	1:23.334	1:23.023	1:22.913	8
9	6	(France) Isack Hadjar	Racing Bulls-Honda RBPT	1:23.373	1:22.997	1:23.072	9
10	22	(Japan) Yuki Tsunoda	Red Bull Racing-Honda RBPT	1:23.386	1:23.034	No time	10
11	87	(United Kingdom) Oliver Bearman	Haas-Ferrari	1:23.254	1:23.041	N/A	11
12	55	(Spain) Carlos Sainz Jr.	Williams-Mercedes	1:23.187	1:23.042	N/A	12
13	30	(New Zealand) Liam Lawson	Racing Bulls-Honda RBPT	1:23.265	1:23.077	N/A	13
14	12	(Italy) Kimi Antonelli	Mercedes	1:22.894	1:23.080	N/A	14
15	18	(Canada) Lance Stroll	Aston Martin Aramco-Mercedes	1:23.316	1:23.097	N/A	15
16	44	(United Kingdom) Lewis Hamilton	Ferrari	1:23.394	N/A	N/A	16
17	23	(Thailand) Alexander Albon	Williams-Mercedes	1:23.416	N/A	N/A	17
18	27	(Germany) Nico Hülkenberg	Kick Sauber-Ferrari	1:23.450	N/A	N/A	18
19	10	(France) Pierre Gasly	Alpine-Renault	1:23.468	N/A	N/A	19
20	43	(Argentina) Franco Colapinto	Alpine-Renault	1:23.890	N/A	N/A	20
107% time: 1:28.387

== Race ==
The race was held on 7 December 2025, at 17:00 local time (UTC+4), and was run for 58 laps.

=== Race report ===
At the start of the race, Max Verstappen cut to the inside to block any challenge from Lando Norris. Norris tucked into second place ahead of Oscar Piastri as the three Championship contenders made it safely through turn one. Piastri then overtook Norris for second place in the opening lap.

Behind them, fourth-placed George Russell made a poor start in the Mercedes, and he was overtaken by both Charles Leclerc and Fernando Alonso. Russell was left in sixth place ahead of Sauber's Gabriel Bortoleto, Racing Bulls' Isack Hadjar, Haas' Esteban Ocon and hard-tyre starter Yuki Tsunoda, who all maintained their starting positions before Piastri overtook Norris while on hard tyres to reach second place. Russell overtook Alonso for fifth.

On lap 11, Verstappen had built out a two-second gap ahead of Piastri, with Norris 4.3 seconds behind. Russell was the first of the top five to pit at the end of lap 14, switching to hard tyres to try to undercut Leclerc. Norris was next to pit at the end of lap 16 followed by Leclerc. After exiting the pits, Norris was tailing Kimi Antonelli and Carlos Sainz Jr., and on lap 19 he passed both Lance Stroll and Liam Lawson in a single move into turn 5.

Norris was now three seconds behind Tsunoda, the latter of whom was in third place behind Piastri and Verstappen. On lap 23, as Norris and Tsunoda battled on the straight between turns 5 and 6, Norris left the track in an attempt to overtake Tsunoda, who was making multiple changes to defend his position. Both drivers were put under investigation: Tsunoda for making more than one change of direction and Norris for leaving the track and gaining an advantage. The FIA stewards later penalised Tsunoda for making more than one change of direction as Norris, whom the stewards decided not to investigate any further, was forced off the track to avoid a collision from Tsunoda's erratic driving. Tsunoda would later serve his five-second penalty at the pits by the end of lap 32, demoting him down to 18th.

Meanwhile, Piastri's hard tyres were starting to show signs of wear, requiring him to pit for mediums a few laps later, eventually rejoining the track in second place.

Norris, on hard tyres, would face pressure from Leclerc but Leclerc was unable to get within two seconds of Norris. Verstappen would win the race, with Piastri finishing in second and Norris in third. Norris' third-place finish was enough to crown him his maiden World Drivers' Championship, while Verstappen's win would allow Red Bull to secure third place in the Constructors' Championship. Lewis Hamilton's eighth place finish meant for the first time in his 19-year career he would go an entire season without recording a Grand Prix podium, ending a record breaking streak since his career began in 2007.

The race was Verstappen and Red Bull's last win until the 2026 Bahrain Grand Prix in Malaysia, their longest streak since 2017.

=== Race classification ===
Pos.	No.	Driver	Constructor	Laps	Time/Retired	Grid	Points
1	1	(Netherlands) Max Verstappen	Red Bull Racing-Honda RBPT	58	1:26:07.469	1	25
2	81	(Australia) Oscar Piastri	McLaren-Mercedes	58	+12.594	3	18
3	4	(United Kingdom) Lando Norris	McLaren-Mercedes	58	+16.572	2	15
4	16	(Monaco) Charles Leclerc	Ferrari	58	+23.279	5	12
5	63	(United Kingdom) George Russell	Mercedes	58	+48.563	4	10
6	14	(Spain) Fernando Alonso	Aston Martin Aramco-Mercedes	58	+1:07.562	6	8
7	31	(France) Esteban Ocon	Haas-Ferrari	58	+1:09.876	8	6
8	44	(United Kingdom) Lewis Hamilton	Ferrari	58	+1:12.670	16	4
9	27	(Germany) Nico Hülkenberg	Kick Sauber-Ferrari	58	+1:19.014	18	2
10	18	(Canada) Lance Stroll	Aston Martin Aramco-Mercedes	58	+1:19.523^{1}	15	1
11	5	(Brazil) Gabriel Bortoleto	Kick Sauber-Ferrari	58	+1:21.043	7	
12	87	(United Kingdom) Oliver Bearman	Haas-Ferrari	58	+1:21.166^{2}	11	
13	55	(Spain) Carlos Sainz Jr.	Williams-Mercedes	58	+1:22.158	12	
14	22	(Japan) Yuki Tsunoda	Red Bull Racing-Honda RBPT	58	+1:23.794	10	
15	12	(Italy) Kimi Antonelli	Mercedes	58	+1:24.399	14	
16	23	(Thailand) Alexander Albon	Williams-Mercedes	58	+1:30.327^{3}	17	
17	6	(France) Isack Hadjar	Racing Bulls-Honda RBPT	57	+1 lap	9	
18	30	(New Zealand) Liam Lawson	Racing Bulls-Honda RBPT	57	+1 lap	13	
19	10	(France) Pierre Gasly	Alpine-Renault	57	+1 lap^{4}	19	
20	43	(Argentina) Franco Colapinto	Alpine-Renault	57	+1 lap	20	

Notes

- ^1 – Lance Stroll finished ninth, but received a five-second time penalty for making more than one change of direction.
- ^2 – Oliver Bearman finished tenth, but received a five-second time penalty for making more than one change of direction.
- ^3 – Alexander Albon received a five-second time penalty for speeding in the pit lane. His final position was not affected by the penalty.
- ^4 – Pierre Gasly received a five-second time penalty for exceeding track limits. His final position was not affected by the penalty.

== Final championship standings ==
Drivers' Championship standings

Pos.	Driver	Points
1	(United Kingdom) **Lando Norris***	423
2	(Netherlands) Max Verstappen	421
3	(Australia) Oscar Piastri	410
4	(United Kingdom) George Russell	319
5	(Monaco) Charles Leclerc	242

Constructors' Championship standings

Pos.	Constructor	Points
1	(United Kingdom) **McLaren-Mercedes***	833
2	(Germany) Mercedes	469
3	(Austria) Red Bull Racing-Honda RBPT	451
4	(Italy) Ferrari	398
5	(United Kingdom) Williams-Mercedes	137

- Note: Only the top five positions are included for both sets of standings.
- Competitors in bold and marked with an asterisk were the 2025 World Champions.

== See also ==
- 2025 Yas Island Formula 2 round

Previous race: 2025 Qatar Grand Prix	FIA Formula One World Championship; 2025 season	Next race: 2026 Australian Grand Prix
Previous race: 2024 Abu Dhabi Grand Prix	Abu Dhabi Grand Prix	Next race: 2026 Abu Dhabi Grand Prix
