= 2024 Abu Dhabi Grand Prix =

Formula One motor race

Race 24 of 24 in the 2024 Formula One World Championship
← Previous race
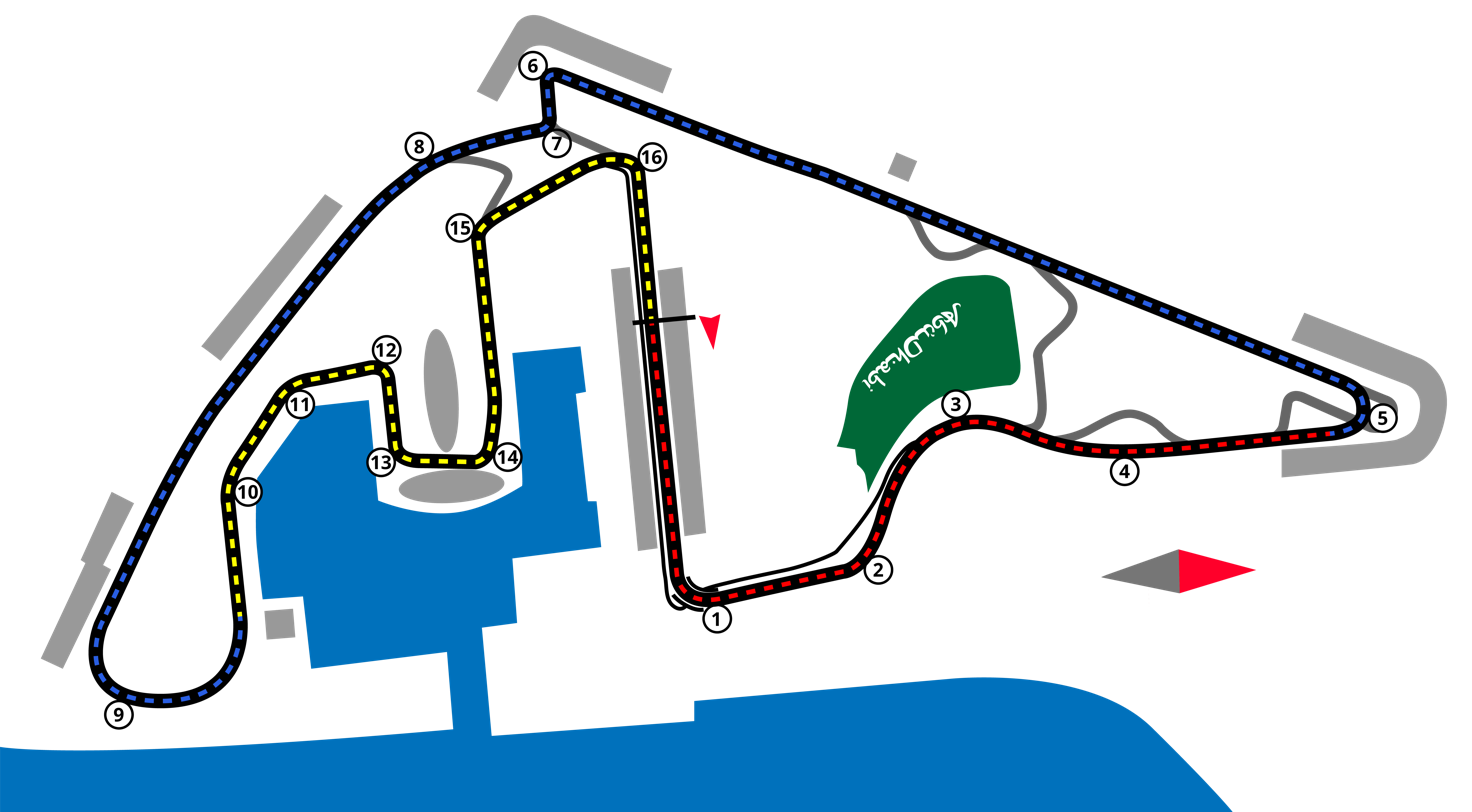
- Layout of the Yas Marina Circuit

Race details
- Date: 8 December 2024
- Official name: Formula 1 Etihad Airways Abu Dhabi Grand Prix 2024
- Location: Yas Marina Circuit; Abu Dhabi, United Arab Emirates
- Course: Permanent racing facility
- Course length: 5.281 km (3.281 miles)
- Distance: 58 laps, 306.183 km (190.253 miles)
- Weather: Clear
- Attendance: 190,000

Pole position
Driver	(United Kingdom) Lando Norris	McLaren-Mercedes
- Time: 1:22.595

Fastest lap
Driver	(Denmark) Kevin Magnussen	Haas-Ferrari
- Time: 1:25.637 on lap 57 (lap record)

Podium
First	(United Kingdom) Lando Norris	McLaren-Mercedes
Second	(Spain) Carlos Sainz Jr.	Ferrari
Third	(Monaco) Charles Leclerc	Ferrari

The 2024 Abu Dhabi Grand Prix (officially known as the Formula 1 Etihad Airways Abu Dhabi Grand Prix 2024) was a Formula One motor race that was held on 8 December 2024 at the Yas Marina Circuit in Abu Dhabi, United Arab Emirates. It was the twenty-fourth and final race of the 2024 Formula One World Championship.

Lando Norris of McLaren took pole position for the race, which he converted to a victory. Norris's victory helped his team take their ninth World Constructors' Championship title, and the first since 1998. Ferrari's Carlos Sainz Jr. came in second in his last race for Ferrari ahead of his teammate, Charles Leclerc. This was the final Formula One race for Zhou Guanyu and Kevin Magnussen. It was also Lewis Hamilton's last race start for Mercedes before moving to Ferrari in 2025, ending the most successful driver-team partnership in Formula One history. Sergio Pérez and Valtteri Bottas made their last race start for Red Bull Racing and Kick Sauber respectively.

== Background ==
The event was held at the Yas Marina Circuit in Abu Dhabi for the 16th time in the circuit's history, across the weekend of 6–8 December. The Grand Prix was the twenty-fourth and final race of the 2024 Formula One World Championship and the 16th running of the Abu Dhabi Grand Prix.

=== Championship standings before the race ===
Going into the weekend, Max Verstappen, who clinched the title at the Las Vegas Grand Prix, led the Drivers' Championship with 429 points, 80 points ahead of Lando Norris in second, and 88 ahead of Charles Leclerc in third. McLaren, holding 640 points, entered this round as the leader of the Constructors' Championship from Ferrari and Red Bull Racing, who were second and third with 619 and 581 points, respectively.

==== Championship permutations ====
McLaren and Ferrari had an opportunity to secure the World Constructors' Championship title at this event, the first since 1998 for McLaren, and the first since 2008 for Ferrari. Ferrari had to outscore McLaren by at least 22 points to win the title, or 21 points if Ferrari won the Grand Prix. Defending Constructors' Champions Red Bull Racing were eliminated from contention after the previous round in Qatar, and were 59 points behind McLaren, with a maximum of 44 points available.

=== Entrants ===
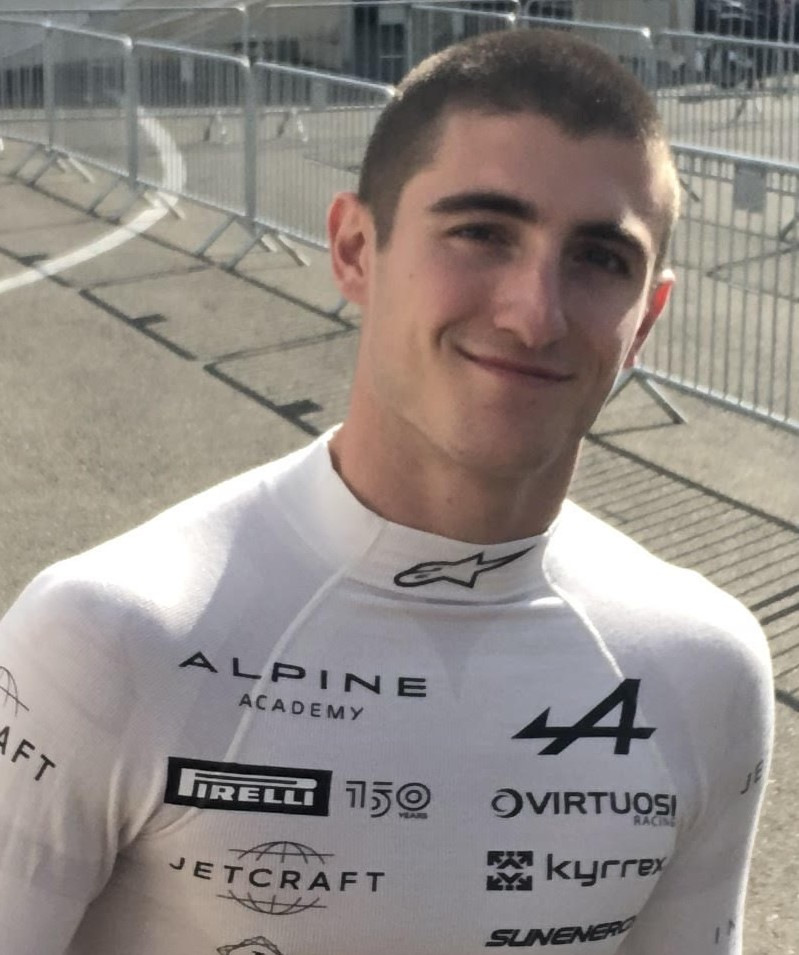
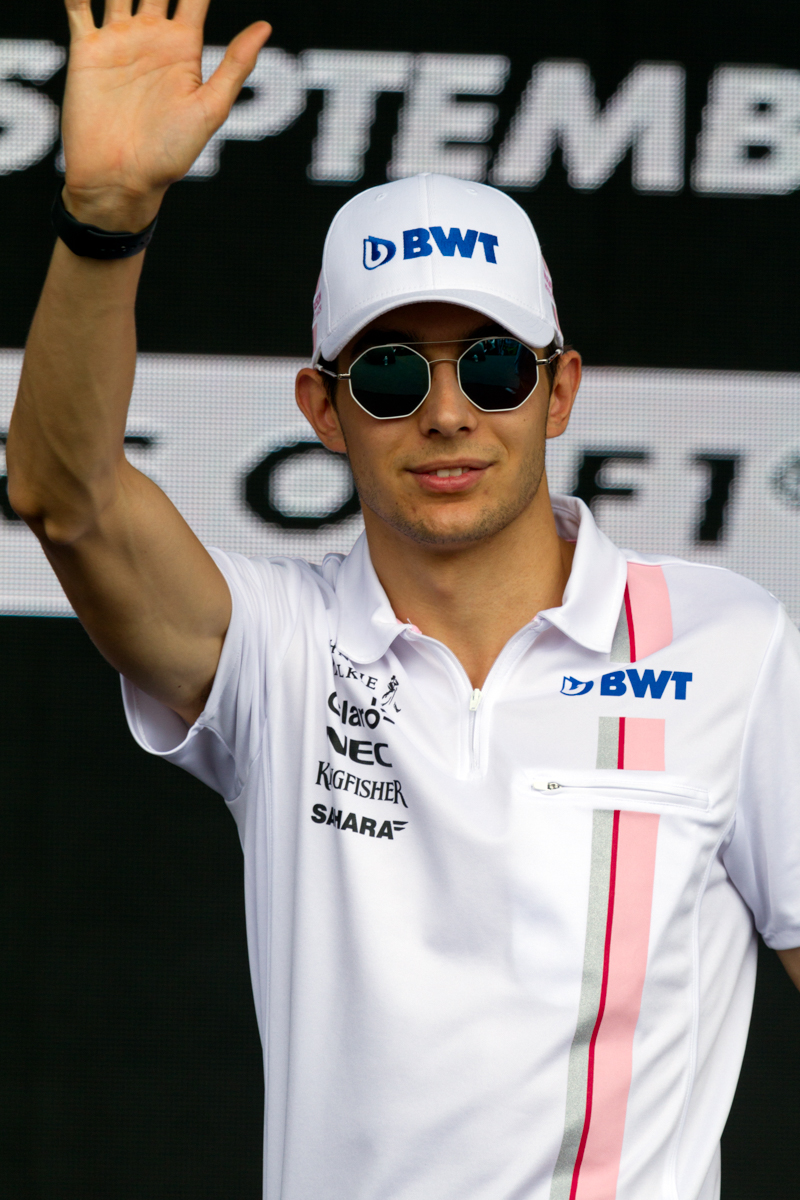
Debutant Jack Doohan (left) replaced Esteban Ocon (right) at Alpine.

The drivers and teams were the same as the season entry list with three exceptions: Franco Colapinto, who replaced Logan Sargeant at Williams from the Italian Grand Prix onwards, Liam Lawson, who replaced Daniel Ricciardo at RB from the United States Grand Prix, and Jack Doohan, who replaced Esteban Ocon at Alpine for this event. Doohan made his Formula One debut ahead of his first full-time season for Alpine in 2025.

During the first practice session, six teams fielded alternate drivers who had not raced in more than two Grands Prix, as required by the Formula One regulations:

- Luke Browning for Williams in place of Alexander Albon.
- Isack Hadjar for Red Bull Racing in place of Max Verstappen.
- Felipe Drugovich for Aston Martin in place of Lance Stroll.
- Ryō Hirakawa for McLaren in place of Oscar Piastri.
- Ayumu Iwasa for RB in place of Yuki Tsunoda.
- Arthur Leclerc for Ferrari in place of Carlos Sainz Jr.

Browning, Hirakawa, and Leclerc made their Formula One practice debuts.

The Grand Prix marked Lewis Hamilton's final race as a Mercedes driver before moving to Ferrari in 2025, Carlos Sainz's final race as a Ferrari driver before moving to Williams, Sergio Pérez's last race with Red Bull Racing, Valtteri Bottas and Zhou Guanyu's final races as Sauber teammates before being replaced by Nico Hülkenberg and Gabriel Bortoleto, and the last career race of Kevin Magnussen, driving for Haas.

=== Tyre choices ===
Tyre supplier Pirelli brought the C3, C4, and C5 tyre compounds (the softest three in their range) designated hard, medium, and soft, respectively, for teams to use at the event.

== Practice ==
Three free practice sessions were held for the event. The first free practice session was held on 6 December 2024, at 13:30 local time (UTC+4), and was topped by Charles Leclerc of Ferrari ahead of Lando Norris of McLaren and Lewis Hamilton of Mercedes. The second free practice session was held on the same day, at 17:00 local time, and was topped by Norris ahead of his teammate Oscar Piastri and Nico Hülkenberg of Haas. The third practice session was held on 7 December 2024, at 14:30 local time, and was topped by Piastri ahead of his teammate Norris and Hamilton.

== Qualifying ==
Qualifying was held on 7 December 2024, at 18:00 local time (UTC+4).

=== Qualifying classification ===
Pos.	No.	Driver	Constructor	Qualifying times			Final grid
Pos.	No.	Driver	Constructor	Q1	Q2	Q3	Final grid
1	4	(United Kingdom) Lando Norris	McLaren-Mercedes	1:23.682	1:23.098	1:22.595	1
2	81	(Australia) Oscar Piastri	McLaren-Mercedes	1:23.640	1:23.199	1:22.804	2
3	55	(Spain) Carlos Sainz Jr.	Ferrari	1:23.487	1:22.985	1:22.824	3
4	27	(Germany) Nico Hülkenberg	Haas-Ferrari	1:23.722	1:23.040	1:22.886	7^{a}
5	1	(Netherlands) Max Verstappen	Red Bull Racing-Honda RBPT	1:23.516	1:22.998	1:22.945	4
6	10	(France) Pierre Gasly	Alpine-Renault	1:23.548	1:23.086	1:22.984	5
7	63	(United Kingdom) George Russell	Mercedes	1:23.678	1:23.283	1:23.132	6
8	14	(Spain) Fernando Alonso	Aston Martin Aramco-Mercedes	1:23.794	1:23.268	1:23.196	8
9	77	(Finland) Valtteri Bottas	Kick Sauber-Ferrari	1:23.481	1:23.341	1:23.204	9
10	11	(Mexico) Sergio Pérez	Red Bull Racing-Honda RBPT	1:23.559	1:23.379	1:23.264	10
11	22	(Japan) Yuki Tsunoda	RB-Honda RBPT	1:23.735	1:23.419	N/A	11
12	30	(New Zealand) Liam Lawson	RB-Honda RBPT	1:23.733	1:23.472	N/A	12
13	18	(Canada) Lance Stroll	Aston Martin Aramco-Mercedes	1:23.729	1:23.784	N/A	13
14	16	(Monaco) Charles Leclerc	Ferrari	1:23.302	1:23.833	N/A	19^{b}
15	20	(Denmark) Kevin Magnussen	Haas-Ferrari	1:23.632	1:23.877	N/A	14
16	23	(Thailand) Alexander Albon	Williams-Mercedes	1:23.821	N/A	N/A	18^{c}
17	24	(China) Zhou Guanyu	Kick Sauber-Ferrari	1:23.880	N/A	N/A	15
18	44	(United Kingdom) Lewis Hamilton	Mercedes	1:23.887	N/A	N/A	16
19	43	(Argentina) Franco Colapinto	Williams-Mercedes	1:23.912	N/A	N/A	20^{d}
20	61	(Australia) Jack Doohan	Alpine-Renault	1:24.105	N/A	N/A	17
107% time: 1:29.133

Notes

- ^a – Nico Hülkenberg received a three-place grid penalty for overtaking two cars in the tunnel section of the pit exit road during Q1.
- ^b – Charles Leclerc received a ten-place grid penalty for a third energy store.
- ^c – Alexander Albon received a five-place grid penalty for a sixth gearbox change.
- ^d – Franco Colapinto received a five-place grid penalty for a seventh gearbox change.

== Race ==
The race was held on 8 December 2024, at 17:00 local time (UTC+4), and was run for 58 laps.

=== Race report ===
Polesitter Lando Norris kept the lead, while his teammate Oscar Piastri was tagged into a spin by Red Bull's Max Verstappen into turn 1. Meanwhile, Verstappen's teammate, Sergio Pérez, was also spun by Valtteri Bottas. On lap 3, Piastri made contact with Franco Colapinto, but Piastri did not suffer any damage, causing Colapinto to slow down and suffering a puncture to let Piastri through. His race engineer reported the collision at the start and Verstappen was given a ten-second time penalty. Pérez, in his last Formula One race for Red Bull, retired from the collision from Bottas, despite Bottas receiving a penalty for causing the collision with Pérez, as he reported a loss of drive from hitting the kerb hardly before spinning.

Charles Leclerc, who started 19th due to serving a ten-place grid penalty, had a good start: by the end of lap 1, he moved up to eighth, and on lap 7, he overtook Nico Hülkenberg, then Fernando Alonso three laps later. Verstappen also made the move on Alonso two laps later, in which the Dutchman progressed to seventh, while the Spaniard dropped to eighth. During lap 24, Liam Lawson was called in for a pit stop on hard tyres, but his front-left tyres were not fitted properly as the jackman dropped Lawson's car. On the same lap, Leclerc progressed by overtaking Pierre Gasly, as did Russell on lap 27. However, on lap 31, Kevin Magnussen was spun by Bottas in the same corner, in a similar move what he did with Pérez, causing Bottas to lose half of his front wing and sustaining a puncture.

Verstappen overtook Alonso again and served his penalty in the past couple of laps, while progressing by overtaking his old Red Bull teammate Pierre Gasly. Piastri, now running in twelfth, made a mistake while attempting to make a move on Yuki Tsunoda. Piastri made up a place on the Japanese driver on lap 49, and then five laps later, he took the last point position, tenth place, by overtaking Alexander Albon. Hamilton, on the final lap, was chasing his teammate George Russell. The race was won by polesitter Norris. Norris's victory allowed his team, McLaren, to win the Constructors' Championship for the first time in 26 years. The podium was completed by Carlos Sainz Jr. in second, his last podium finish for Ferrari, and Leclerc in third place. Some time after Norris had taken the chequered flag to win the race, Hamilton and Russell battled for fourth place. The two almost made contact, but Hamilton passed Russell on the outside of turn 9 and got ahead, completing his final stint with Mercedes.

=== Race classification ===
Pos.	No.	Driver	Constructor	Laps	Time/Retired	Grid	Points
1	4	(United Kingdom) Lando Norris	McLaren-Mercedes	58	1:26:33.291	1	25
2	55	(Spain) Carlos Sainz Jr.	Ferrari	58	+5.832	3	18
3	16	(Monaco) Charles Leclerc	Ferrari	58	+31.928	19	15
4	44	(United Kingdom) Lewis Hamilton	Mercedes	58	+36.483	16	12
5	63	(United Kingdom) George Russell	Mercedes	58	+37.538	6	10
6	1	(Netherlands) Max Verstappen	Red Bull Racing-Honda RBPT	58	+49.847	4	8
7	10	(France) Pierre Gasly	Alpine-Renault	58	+1:12.560	5	6
8	27	(Germany) Nico Hülkenberg	Haas-Ferrari	58	+1:15.554	7	4
9	14	(Spain) Fernando Alonso	Aston Martin Aramco-Mercedes	58	+1:22.373	8	2
10	81	(Australia) Oscar Piastri	McLaren-Mercedes	58	+1:23.821	2	1
11	23	(Thailand) Alexander Albon	Williams-Mercedes	57	+1 lap	18	
12	22	(Japan) Yuki Tsunoda	RB-Honda RBPT	57	+1 lap	11	
13	24	(China) Zhou Guanyu	Kick Sauber-Ferrari	57	+1 lap	15	
14	18	(Canada) Lance Stroll	Aston Martin Aramco-Mercedes	57	+1 lap^{a}	13	
15	61	(Australia) Jack Doohan	Alpine-Renault	57	+1 lap	17	
16	20	(Denmark) Kevin Magnussen	Haas-Ferrari	57	+1 lap	14	
17^{b}	30	(New Zealand) Liam Lawson	RB-Honda RBPT	55	Brakes	12	
Ret	77	(Finland) Valtteri Bottas	Kick Sauber-Ferrari	30	Collision damage	9	
Ret	43	(Argentina) Franco Colapinto	Williams-Mercedes	26	Engine	20	
Ret	11	(Mexico) Sergio Pérez	Red Bull Racing-Honda RBPT	0	Collision	10	
Fastest lap: (Denmark) Kevin Magnussen (Haas-Ferrari) – 1:25.637 (lap 57)

Notes

- ^a – Lance Stroll finished 12th, but received a five-second time penalty for exceeding track limits.
- ^b – Liam Lawson was classified as he completed more than 90% of the race distance.

== Final championship standings ==
Drivers' Championship standings

Pos.	Driver	Points
1	(Netherlands) **Max Verstappen***	437
2	(United Kingdom) Lando Norris	374
3	(Monaco) Charles Leclerc	356
4	(Australia) Oscar Piastri	292
5	(Spain) Carlos Sainz Jr.	290

Constructors' Championship standings

Pos.	Constructor	Points
1	(United Kingdom) **McLaren-Mercedes***	666
2	(Italy) Ferrari	652
3	(Austria) Red Bull Racing-Honda RBPT	589
4	(Germany) Mercedes	468
5	(United Kingdom) Aston Martin Aramco-Mercedes	94

- Note: Only the top five positions are included for both sets of standings.
- Competitors in bold and marked with an asterisk are the 2024 World Champions.

== See also ==
- 2024 Yas Island Formula 2 round

Previous race: 2024 Qatar Grand Prix	FIA Formula One World Championship; 2024 season	Next race: 2025 Australian Grand Prix
Previous race: 2023 Abu Dhabi Grand Prix	Abu Dhabi Grand Prix	Next race: 2025 Abu Dhabi Grand Prix
