= 2021 Qatar Grand Prix =

20th round of the 2021 Formula One season

Race 20 of 22 in the 2021 Formula One World Championship
← Previous race	Next race →
- The circuit layout

Race details
- Date: 21 November 2021
- Official name: Formula 1 Ooredoo Qatar Grand Prix 2021
- Location: Losail International Circuit, Lusail, Al Daayen, Qatar
- Course: Permanent racing facility
- Course length: 5.380 km (3.343 miles)
- Distance: 57 laps, 306.660 km (190.550 miles)
- Weather: Clear
- Attendance: 80,000

Pole position
Driver	(United Kingdom) Lewis Hamilton	Mercedes
- Time: 1:20.827

Fastest lap
Driver	(Netherlands) Max Verstappen	Red Bull Racing-Honda
- Time: 1:23.196 on lap 57 (lap record)

Podium
First	(United Kingdom) Lewis Hamilton	Mercedes
Second	(Netherlands) Max Verstappen	Red Bull Racing-Honda
Third	(Spain) Fernando Alonso	Alpine-Renault

The 2021 Qatar Grand Prix (officially known as the Formula 1 Ooredoo Qatar Grand Prix 2021) was a Formula One motor race, held on 21 November 2021 at the Lusail International Circuit in Qatar. The inaugural Qatar Grand Prix, it was the 20th round of the 2021 Formula One World Championship.

Mercedes driver Lewis Hamilton won the race ahead of Red Bull driver Max Verstappen, while Alpine's Fernando Alonso scored his first podium since the 2014 Hungarian Grand Prix, as well as his first podium with Team Enstone since the 2009 Singapore Grand Prix.

As a result of Hamilton's victory, Losail became the 30th different circuit where he has won a Grand Prix.

== Background ==
The Qatar Grand Prix did not feature on the original calendar, but was added in place of the Australian Grand Prix, which was cancelled due to the COVID-19 pandemic. It was the first Qatar Grand Prix, with a 10-year contract to host the Qatar Grand Prix from 2023 at a new purpose-built circuit; there was no Qatar Grand Prix in 2022, as the country hosted the FIFA World Cup.

=== Championship standings ===
Heading into the race, Max Verstappen led the World Drivers' Standings with 332.5 points, 14 points ahead of second-placed Lewis Hamilton. Valtteri Bottas was in third on 203 points, too far behind Verstappen to be able to win the title but 25 points ahead of Sergio Pérez in fourth, with Lando Norris fifth on 151 points. In the World Constructors' Standings, Mercedes led with 521.5 points, 11 points ahead of second-placed Red Bull Racing. Ferrari were third with 287.5 points ahead of McLaren on 256. Alpine and AlphaTauri were fifth and sixth with 112 points each, with Alpine being ahead courtesy of a win, compared to no wins for AlphaTauri.

=== Entrants ===
The drivers and teams were the same as the season entry list with no additional stand-in drivers for the race or practice.

=== Tyre choices ===
Sole tyre supplier Pirelli allocated the C1, C2, and C3 compounds of tyre to be used during this Grand Prix weekend.

== Practice ==
The event held three practice sessions, each lasting one hour. The first two practice sessions were on Friday, 19 November at 13:30 and 17:00 local time (UTC+03:00) respectively. The first practice session ended with Max Verstappen fastest for Red Bull Racing, ahead of AlphaTauri driver Pierre Gasly and Mercedes driver Lewis Hamilton. Second practice ended with Valtteri Bottas fastest, then Gasly and Verstappen. In the third practice session, held on Saturday from 14:00, Bottas was again fastest, with his teammate Hamilton second.

== Qualifying ==
Qualifying took place at 17:00 local time, and lasted one hour, with Hamilton qualifying on pole. Verstappen, who qualified second, received a five-grid place penalty for failure to respect double yellow flags in Q3.

=== Qualifying classification ===
Pos.	No.	Driver	Constructor	Qualifying times			Final grid
Pos.	No.	Driver	Constructor	Q1	Q2	Q3	Final grid
1	44	(United Kingdom) Lewis Hamilton	Mercedes	1:21.901	1:21.682	1:20.827	1
2	33	(Netherlands) Max Verstappen	Red Bull Racing-Honda	1:21.996	1:21.984	1:21.424	7^{a}
3	77	(Finland) Valtteri Bottas	Mercedes	1:22.016	1:21.991	1:21.478	6^{b}
4	10	(France) Pierre Gasly	AlphaTauri-Honda	1:22.535	1:21.728	1:21.640	2
5	14	(Spain) Fernando Alonso	Alpine-Renault	1:22.422	1:21.894	1:21.670	3
6	4	(United Kingdom) Lando Norris	McLaren-Mercedes	1:22.839	1:22.216	1:21.732	4
7	55	(Spain) Carlos Sainz Jr.	Ferrari	1:22.304	1:22.241	1:21.840	5
8	22	(Japan) Yuki Tsunoda	AlphaTauri-Honda	1:22.458	1:22.058	1:21.881	8
9	31	(France) Esteban Ocon	Alpine-Renault	1:22.565	1:22.012	1:22.028	9
10	5	(Germany) Sebastian Vettel	Aston Martin-Mercedes	1:22.549	1:22.146	1:22.785	10
11	11	(Mexico) Sergio Pérez	Red Bull Racing-Honda	1:22.398	1:22.346	N/A	11
12	18	(Canada) Lance Stroll	Aston Martin-Mercedes	1:22.551	1:22.460	N/A	12
13	16	(Monaco) Charles Leclerc	Ferrari	1:22.742	1:22.463	N/A	13
14	3	(Australia) Daniel Ricciardo	McLaren-Mercedes	1:22.688	1:22.597	N/A	14
15	63	(United Kingdom) George Russell	Williams-Mercedes	1:22.863	1:22.756	N/A	15
16	7	(Finland) Kimi Räikkönen	Alfa Romeo Racing-Ferrari	1:23.156	N/A	N/A	16
17	6	(Canada) Nicholas Latifi	Williams-Mercedes	1:23.213	N/A	N/A	17
18	99	(Italy) Antonio Giovinazzi	Alfa Romeo Racing-Ferrari	1:23.262	N/A	N/A	18
19	47	(Germany) Mick Schumacher	Haas-Ferrari	1:23.407	N/A	N/A	19
20	9	(Russian Automobile Federation) Nikita Mazepin (Note: Nikita Mazepin is Russian, but he competed as a neutral competitor using the designation RAF (Russian Automobile Federation), as the Court of Arbitration for Sport upheld a ban on Russia competing at World Championships. The ban was implemented by the World Anti-Doping Agency in response to the state-sponsored doping program of Russian athletes.)	Haas-Ferrari	1:25.589	N/A	N/A	20
107% time: 1:27.634

Notes

- ^a – Max Verstappen received a five-place grid penalty for failing to respect a double waved yellow flag in Q3.
- ^b – Valtteri Bottas received a three-place grid penalty for failing to respect a single waved yellow flag in Q3.

== Race ==
The race began at 17:00 local time and was contested over 57 laps. The race was noted for four front-left tyre failures, as teams attempted to run one-stop strategies against Pirelli's advice. Hamilton won the race, leading every lap, but Verstappen, who finished second, denied him a grand slam by setting the fastest lap. Fernando Alonso finished third, taking his first podium since the 2014 Hungarian Grand Prix.

=== Race classification ===
Pos.	No.	Driver	Constructor	Laps	Time/Retired	Grid	Points
1	44	(United Kingdom) Lewis Hamilton	Mercedes	57	1:24:28.471	1	25
2	33	(Netherlands) Max Verstappen	Red Bull Racing-Honda	57	+25.743	7	19^{a}
3	14	(Spain) Fernando Alonso	Alpine-Renault	57	+59.457	3	15
4	11	(Mexico) Sergio Pérez	Red Bull Racing-Honda	57	+1:02.306	11	12
5	31	(France) Esteban Ocon	Alpine-Renault	57	+1:20.570	9	10
6	18	(Canada) Lance Stroll	Aston Martin-Mercedes	57	+1:21.274	12	8
7	55	(Spain) Carlos Sainz Jr.	Ferrari	57	+1:21.911	5	6
8	16	(Monaco) Charles Leclerc	Ferrari	57	+1:23.126	13	4
9	4	(United Kingdom) Lando Norris	McLaren-Mercedes	56	+1 lap	4	2
10	5	(Germany) Sebastian Vettel	Aston Martin-Mercedes	56	+1 lap	10	1
11	10	(France) Pierre Gasly	AlphaTauri-Honda	56	+1 lap	2	
12	3	(Australia) Daniel Ricciardo	McLaren-Mercedes	56	+1 lap	14	
13	22	(Japan) Yuki Tsunoda	AlphaTauri-Honda	56	+1 lap	8	
14	7	(Finland) Kimi Räikkönen	Alfa Romeo Racing-Ferrari	56	+1 lap	16	
15	99	(Italy) Antonio Giovinazzi	Alfa Romeo Racing-Ferrari	56	+1 lap	18	
16	47	(Germany) Mick Schumacher	Haas-Ferrari	56	+1 lap	19	
17	63	(United Kingdom) George Russell	Williams-Mercedes	55	+2 laps	15	
18	9	(Russian Automobile Federation) Nikita Mazepin	Haas-Ferrari	55	+2 laps	20	
Ret	6	(Canada) Nicholas Latifi	Williams-Mercedes	50	Puncture	17	
Ret	77	(Finland) Valtteri Bottas	Mercedes	48	Puncture damage	6	
Fastest lap: (Netherlands) Max Verstappen (Red Bull Racing-Honda) – 1:23.196 (lap 57)

Notes

- ^a – Includes one point for fastest lap.

== Championship standings after the race ==
Drivers' Championship standings

	Pos.	Driver	Points
Unchanged	1	(Netherlands) Max Verstappen*	351.5
Unchanged	2	(United Kingdom) Lewis Hamilton*	343.5
Unchanged	3	(Finland) Valtteri Bottas	203
Unchanged	4	(Mexico) Sergio Pérez	190
Unchanged	5	(United Kingdom) Lando Norris	153

Constructors' Championship standings

	Pos.	Constructor	Points
Unchanged	1	(Germany) Mercedes*	546.5
Unchanged	2	(Austria) Red Bull Racing-Honda*	541.5
Unchanged	3	(Italy) Ferrari	297.5
Unchanged	4	(United Kingdom) McLaren-Mercedes	258
Unchanged	5	(France) Alpine-Renault	137

- Note: Only the top five positions are included for both sets of standings.
- Bold text and an asterisk indicates competitors who still had a theoretical chance of becoming World Champion.

== Notes ==
Previous race: 2021 São Paulo Grand Prix	FIA Formula One World Championship; 2021 season	Next race: 2021 Saudi Arabian Grand Prix
Previous race: None	Qatar Grand Prix	Next race: 2023 Qatar Grand Prix
