= Qatar Grand Prix =

Formula One race

- Lusail International Circuit

Race information
- Number of times held: 4
- First held: 2021
- Most wins (drivers): (Netherlands) Max Verstappen (3)
- Most wins (constructors): (Austria) Red Bull Racing (3)
- Circuit length: 5.419 km (3.367 miles)
- Race length: 308.611 km (191.762 miles)
- Laps: 57

Last race (2025)

Pole position
- (Australia) Oscar Piastri; McLaren-Mercedes; 1:19.387

Podium
- 1. (Netherlands) M. Verstappen; Red Bull Racing-Honda RBPT; 1:24:38.241; 2. (Australia) O. Piastri; McLaren-Mercedes; +7.995; 3. (Spain) C. Sainz Jr.; Williams-Mercedes; +22.665

Fastest lap
- (Australia) Oscar Piastri; McLaren-Mercedes; 1:22.996

The Qatar Grand Prix (Arabic: جائزة قطر الكبرى) is a Formula One motor racing event which is held in Qatar. It was held for the first time on 21 November as part of the 2021 championship at the Lusail International Circuit, and after not taking place during the 2022 season due to the 2022 FIFA World Cup taking place in Qatar, it rejoined the calendar in 2023 under a 10-year contract. The race was established as the fourth full-night race (as opposed to day or day-to-night races) on the Formula One calendar, following the Singapore, Bahrain and Sakhir Grands Prix.

== History ==
=== Origin ===
The 2021 Formula One season was initially planned over 23 races. The opening round of the season, the Australian Grand Prix, was initially postponed due to COVID-19 restrictions in the country before being cancelled.

The cancellation of the Australian Grand Prix occurred late during the season and left a vacancy in the calendar, and the inaugural Qatar Grand Prix was announced as its replacement in October 2021.

=== 2021 ===
The inaugural edition of the Qatar Grand Prix took place on 21 November, in place of the cancelled Australian Grand Prix. The race was won by Lewis Hamilton, with Max Verstappen and Fernando Alonso completing the podium.

The Grand Prix has received criticism from Amnesty International on the grounds of human rights abuses in Qatar. In response to Amnesty International, Formula One said that "For decades Formula One has worked hard [to] be a positive force everywhere it races, including economic, social, and cultural benefits. Sports like Formula One are uniquely positioned to cross borders and cultures to bring countries and communities together to share the passion and excitement of incredible competition and achievement. We take our responsibilities on rights very seriously and set high ethical standards for counter parties and those in our supply chain, which are enshrined in contracts, and we pay close attention to their adherence." The same response was made for the Saudi Arabian Grand Prix, another Grand Prix in the Middle East that also made its debut in 2021, for similar reasons.

=== 2023 ===
After a one year absence in 2022, due to the 2022 FIFA World Cup which was staged in Qatar between November and December, the Qatar Grand Prix returned to the calendar on a 10-year contract from 2023. A new purpose-built circuit was initially proposed for the 2023 race, before being retained in Lusail. The Grand Prix featured one of six sprints in the season which was won by Oscar Piastri, claiming his first Formula One sprint victory. Max Verstappen clinched his third World Drivers' Championship title and third in a row.

=== 2024 ===
The Grand Prix featured one of six sprints in the season for the second time overall. Oscar Piastri won the sprint from McLaren teammate Lando Norris and Mercedes' George Russell. After newly-crowned Drivers' Champion Max Verstappen suffered a one-place grid drop from a provisional pole position start, ceding it to Russell, he passed the Mercedes driver anyway during the race and won ahead of Ferrari driver Charles Leclerc and Piastri.

=== 2025 ===
The Grand Prix featured one of six sprints in the season for the third time overall. A limit of 25 laps over the course of the race weekend for each set of tyres was introduced. As the Grand Prix was run for 57 laps, each driver was required to change tyres at least twice. Unlike the 2023 race, laps run under the safety car or virtual safety car counted towards the limit.

=== 2026 ===
A limit of 27 laps over the course of the race weekend for each set of tyres was established, similarly to the 2025 race. With 57 laps scheduled, each driver was required to change tyres at least twice.

== Winners ==
=== By year ===
Year	Driver	Constructor	Report
2021	(United Kingdom) Lewis Hamilton	Mercedes	Report
2022	Not held		
2023	(Netherlands) Max Verstappen	Red Bull Racing-Honda RBPT	Report
2024	(Netherlands) Max Verstappen	Red Bull Racing-Honda RBPT	Report
2025	(Netherlands) Max Verstappen	Red Bull Racing-Honda RBPT	Report

=== Repeat winners (drivers) ===
Drivers in bold are competing in the Formula One championship in 2026.

Wins	Driver	Years won
3	**(Netherlands) Max Verstappen**	2023, 2024, 2025

=== Repeat winners (constructors) ===
Teams in bold are competing in the Formula One championship in 2026.

Wins	Constructor	Years won
3	(Austria) **Red Bull Racing**	2023, 2024, 2025

=== Repeat winners (engine manufacturers) ===
Manufacturers in bold are competing in the Formula One championship in 2026.

Wins	Manufacturer	Years won
3	(Japan) Honda RBPT	2023, 2024, 2025
