= 2024 Qatar Grand Prix =

Formula One motor race

Race 23 of 24 in the 2024 Formula One World Championship
| ← Previous race | Next race → |
- Layout of the Lusail International Circuit

Race details
- Date: 1 December 2024
- Official name: Formula 1 Qatar Airways Qatar Grand Prix 2024
- Location: Lusail International Circuit; Lusail, Qatar
- Course: Permanent racing facility
- Course length: 5.419 km (3.367 miles)
- Distance: 57 laps, 308.611 km (191.762 miles)
- Weather: Clear
- Attendance: 154,973

Pole position
| Driver | (United Kingdom) George Russell (Note: Max Verstappen set the fastest time in qualifying, but received a one-place grid penalty for driving unnecessarily slowly. George Russell was promoted to pole position in his place.) | Mercedes |
- Time: 1:20.575

Fastest lap
| Driver | (United Kingdom) Lando Norris | McLaren-Mercedes |
- Time: 1:22.384 on lap 56 (lap record)

Podium
| First | (Netherlands) Max Verstappen | Red Bull Racing-Honda RBPT |
| Second | (Monaco) Charles Leclerc | Ferrari |
| Third | (Australia) Oscar Piastri | McLaren-Mercedes |

The 2024 Qatar Grand Prix (officially known as the Formula 1 Qatar Airways Qatar Grand Prix 2024) was a Formula One motor race held on 1 December 2024 at the Lusail International Circuit in Lusail, Qatar. It was the twenty-third and penultimate round of the 2024 Formula One World Championship and the sixth and final Grand Prix weekend of the season to utilise the sprint format.

Lando Norris of McLaren took pole position for the sprint event, and then ceded position to his teammate Oscar Piastri in the closing lap of the sprint. Piastri won his second sprint race ahead of Norris and George Russell of Mercedes. Russell took pole position for the main race after Max Verstappen of Red Bull Racing, who set the fastest time in qualifying, was demoted a position due to driving slowly during qualifying. Despite the penalty, Verstappen went on to win the race ahead of Ferrari's Charles Leclerc and Piastri. This was the last race where the fastest lap point was awarded after being reintroduced for the 2019 season.

Despite Verstappen winning the Grand Prix, Red Bull were mathematically eliminated from championship contention, leaving McLaren and Ferrari as the remaining title contenders heading into the final round in Abu Dhabi, with McLaren leading on 640 points, 21 ahead of Ferrari as 44 points to score. McLaren needed 22 points in the final race to win their first Constructors' title since 1998 (in case that Ferrari would fail to set the fastest lap).

== Background ==
The event was held at the Lusail International Circuit in Lusail for the third time in the circuit's history, across the weekend of 29 November – 1 December. The Grand Prix was the twenty-third and penultimate round of the 2024 Formula One World Championship and the third running of the Qatar Grand Prix. It was also the sixth and final Grand Prix in the season to utilise the sprint format and the second time overall that the Qatar Grand Prix featured it.

=== Championship standings before the race ===
Going into the weekend, Max Verstappen, who clinched the title at the previous Grand Prix, led the Drivers' Championship with 403 points, 63 points ahead of Lando Norris in second, and 84 ahead of Charles Leclerc in third. McLaren, holding 608 points, entered this round as the leader of the Constructors' Championship from Ferrari and Red Bull Racing, who were second and third with 584 and 555 points, respectively.

==== Championship permutations ====
McLaren had an opportunity to secure its ninth World Constructors' Championship title at this event, the first since 1998. At the conclusion of this Grand Prix, there would have been one race left in the 2024 Formula One World Championship, with 44 points still available. McLaren could have won the title if they had outscored Ferrari by at least 20 points, and would not have been outscored by Red Bull Racing by more than 9. The title could not be decided at the end of the sprint.

=== Entrants ===
The drivers and teams were the same as the season entry list with two exceptions: Franco Colapinto, who replaced Logan Sargeant at Williams from the Italian Grand Prix onwards, and Liam Lawson, who replaced Daniel Ricciardo at RB from the United States Grand Prix.

The Grand Prix marked Esteban Ocon's last race start for Alpine, as he was required by the team to exit one race early so he could drive for Haas in the post-season test in anticipation for their 2025 campaign together. Reserve driver and 2025 signing Jack Doohan was called up to replace him for the Abu Dhabi Grand Prix.

=== Tyre choices ===
Tyre supplier Pirelli brought the C1, C2, and C3 tyre compounds (the three hardest in their range) designated hard, medium, and soft, respectively, for teams to use at the event.

=== Track changes ===
The DRS zone leading in to turn 1 was shortened by 100 metres (330 ft).

== Practice ==
The only free practice session was held on 29 November 2024, at 16:30 local time (UTC+3), and was topped by Charles Leclerc of Ferrari ahead of Lando Norris of McLaren and his teammate Oscar Piastri.

== Sprint qualifying ==
Sprint qualifying was held on 29 November 2024, at 20:30 local time (UTC+3), and determined the starting grid order for the sprint.

=== Sprint qualifying classification ===
| Pos. | No. | Driver | Constructor | Qualifying times | | | Sprint grid |
| Pos. | No. | Driver | Constructor | SQ1 | SQ2 | SQ3 | Sprint grid |
|---|---|---|---|---|---|---|---|
| 1 | 4 | (United Kingdom) Lando Norris | McLaren-Mercedes | 1:21.356 | 1:21.231 | 1:21.012 | 1 |
| 2 | 63 | (United Kingdom) George Russell | Mercedes | 1:22.021 | 1:21.488 | 1:21.075 | 2 |
| 3 | 81 | (Australia) Oscar Piastri | McLaren-Mercedes | 1:22.218 | 1:21.548 | 1:21.171 | 3 |
| 4 | 55 | (Spain) Carlos Sainz Jr. | Ferrari | 1:21.838 | 1:21.809 | 1:21.281 | 4 |
| 5 | 16 | (Monaco) Charles Leclerc | Ferrari | 1:22.156 | 1:21.818 | 1:21.308 | 5 |
| 6 | 1 | (Netherlands) Max Verstappen | Red Bull Racing-Honda RBPT | 1:22.033 | 1:21.784 | 1:21.315 | 6 |
| 7 | 44 | (United Kingdom) Lewis Hamilton | Mercedes | 1:22.151 | 1:21.734 | 1:21.474 | 7 |
| 8 | 10 | (France) Pierre Gasly | Alpine-Renault | 1:22.586 | 1:22.352 | 1:21.978 | 8 |
| 9 | 27 | (Germany) Nico Hülkenberg | Haas-Ferrari | 1:22.569 | 1:22.318 | 1:22.088 | 9 |
| 10 | 30 | (New Zealand) Liam Lawson | RB-Honda RBPT | 1:22.705 | 1:22.393 | 1:22.577 | 10 |
| 11 | 14 | (Spain) Fernando Alonso | Aston Martin Aramco-Mercedes | 1:22.499 | 1:22.433 | N/A | 11 |
| 12 | 23 | (Thailand) Alexander Albon | Williams-Mercedes | 1:22.705 | 1:22.526 | N/A | 12 |
| 13 | 77 | (Finland) Valtteri Bottas | Kick Sauber-Ferrari | 1:22.506 | 1:22.538 | N/A | 13 |
| 14 | 18 | (Canada) Lance Stroll | Aston Martin Aramco-Mercedes | 1:22.522 | 1:22.599 | N/A | 14 |
| 15 | 20 | (Denmark) Kevin Magnussen | Haas-Ferrari | 1:22.560 | 1:22.738 | N/A | 15 |
| 16 | 11 | (Mexico) Sergio Pérez | Red Bull Racing-Honda RBPT | 1:22.718 | N/A | N/A | PL^{a} |
| 17 | 22 | (Japan) Yuki Tsunoda | RB-Honda RBPT | 1:22.722 | N/A | N/A | 16 |
| 18 | 31 | (France) Esteban Ocon | Alpine-Renault | 1:22.906 | N/A | N/A | 17 |
| 19 | 24 | (China) Zhou Guanyu | Kick Sauber-Ferrari | 1:22.948 | N/A | N/A | 18 |
| 20 | 43 | (Argentina) Franco Colapinto | Williams-Mercedes | 1:23.423 | N/A | N/A | PL^{a} |
107% time: 1:27.050

Notes

- ^a – Sergio Pérez and Franco Colapinto qualified 16th and 20th, respectively, but were required to start the sprint from the pit lane as their cars were modified under parc fermé conditions.

== Sprint ==
The sprint was held on 30 November 2024, at 17:00 local time (UTC+3), and was run for 19 laps.

=== Sprint report ===
Sergio Pérez and Franco Colapinto both started from the pit lane due to unauthorised changes to their cars in parc fermé. Lando Norris led into turn 1, with Oscar Piastri narrowly ahead of George Russell. McLaren instructed Norris to keep Piastri within a second of him in order to give Piastri DRS to help him stay ahead of Russell. On lap 10, Charles Leclerc overtook Lewis Hamilton to take fifth place. Zhou Guanyu was forced to box to replace his graining soft tyres, while Pérez would also box for a new front wing.

On the race’s last lap, despite McLaren’s wishing to keep the order, Norris slowed down to let Piastri take the chequered flag first, handing him victory. Norris later clarified he was "returning the favour", after Piastri allowed Norris to overtake him to take a sprint victory in the São Paulo Grand Prix. Russell completed the podium ahead of Carlos Sainz Jr., Leclerc, Hamilton, Nico Hülkenberg and Max Verstappen, who was unable to catch Hülkenberg after being overtaken by him on the first lap.

=== Sprint classification ===
| Pos. | No. | Driver | Constructor | Laps | Time/Retired | Grid | Points |
|---|---|---|---|---|---|---|---|
| 1 | 81 | (Australia) Oscar Piastri | McLaren-Mercedes | 19 | 27:03.010 | 3 | 8 |
| 2 | 4 | (United Kingdom) Lando Norris | McLaren-Mercedes | 19 | +0.136 | 1 | 7 |
| 3 | 63 | (United Kingdom) George Russell | Mercedes | 19 | +0.410 | 2 | 6 |
| 4 | 55 | (Spain) Carlos Sainz Jr. | Ferrari | 19 | +1.326 | 4 | 5 |
| 5 | 16 | (Monaco) Charles Leclerc | Ferrari | 19 | +5.073 | 5 | 4 |
| 6 | 44 | (United Kingdom) Lewis Hamilton | Mercedes | 19 | +5.650 | 7 | 3 |
| 7 | 27 | (Germany) Nico Hülkenberg | Haas-Ferrari | 19 | +8.508 | 9 | 2 |
| 8 | 1 | (Netherlands) Max Verstappen | Red Bull Racing-Honda RBPT | 19 | +10.368 | 6 | 1 |
| 9 | 10 | (France) Pierre Gasly | Alpine-Renault | 19 | +14.513 | 8 | |
| 10 | 20 | (Denmark) Kevin Magnussen | Haas-Ferrari | 19 | +15.485 | 15 | |
| 11 | 14 | (Spain) Fernando Alonso | Aston Martin Aramco-Mercedes | 19 | +19.204 | 11 | |
| 12 | 77 | (Finland) Valtteri Bottas | Kick Sauber-Ferrari | 19 | +23.351 | 13 | |
| 13 | 18 | (Canada) Lance Stroll | Aston Martin Aramco-Mercedes | 19 | +24.421 | 14 | |
| 14 | 31 | (France) Esteban Ocon | Alpine-Renault | 19 | +30.379 | 17 | |
| 15 | 23 | (Thailand) Alexander Albon | Williams-Mercedes | 19 | +33.062 | 12 | |
| 16 | 30 | (New Zealand) Liam Lawson | RB-Honda RBPT | 19 | +34.356 | 10 | |
| 17 | 22 | (Japan) Yuki Tsunoda | RB-Honda RBPT | 19 | +35.102 | 16 | |
| 18 | 43 | (Argentina) Franco Colapinto | Williams-Mercedes | 19 | +35.639 | PL | |
| 19 | 24 | (China) Zhou Guanyu | Kick Sauber-Ferrari | 19 | +1:11.436 | 18 | |
| 20 | 11 | (Mexico) Sergio Pérez | Red Bull Racing-Honda RBPT | 19 | +1:14.371 | PL | |
Fastest lap: (Monaco) Charles Leclerc (Ferrari) – 1:23.923 (lap 18)

== Qualifying ==
Qualifying was held on 30 November 2024, at 21:00 local time (UTC+3), and determined the starting grid order for the main race.

=== Qualifying classification ===
| Pos. | No. | Driver | Constructor | Qualifying times | | | Final grid |
| Pos. | No. | Driver | Constructor | Q1 | Q2 | Q3 | Final grid |
|---|---|---|---|---|---|---|---|
| 1 | 1 | (Netherlands) Max Verstappen | Red Bull Racing-Honda RBPT | 1:21.579 | 1:20.687 | 1:20.520 | 2^{a} |
| 2 | 63 | (United Kingdom) George Russell | Mercedes | 1:21.241 | 1:21.069 | 1:20.575 | 1 |
| 3 | 4 | (United Kingdom) Lando Norris | McLaren-Mercedes | 1:21.578 | 1:20.983 | 1:20.772 | 3 |
| 4 | 81 | (Australia) Oscar Piastri | McLaren-Mercedes | 1:21.821 | 1:21.121 | 1:20.829 | 4 |
| 5 | 16 | (Monaco) Charles Leclerc | Ferrari | 1:21.278 | 1:21.000 | 1:20.852 | 5 |
| 6 | 44 | (United Kingdom) Lewis Hamilton | Mercedes | 1:21.637 | 1:21.095 | 1:21.011 | 6 |
| 7 | 55 | (Spain) Carlos Sainz Jr. | Ferrari | 1:21.447 | 1:21.199 | 1:21.041 | 7 |
| 8 | 14 | (Spain) Fernando Alonso | Aston Martin Aramco-Mercedes | 1:21.608 | 1:21.208 | 1:21.251 | 8 |
| 9 | 11 | (Mexico) Sergio Pérez | Red Bull Racing-Honda RBPT | 1:21.675 | 1:21.425 | 1:21.425 | 9 |
| 10 | 20 | (Denmark) Kevin Magnussen | Haas-Ferrari | 1:21.891 | 1:21.387 | 1:21.500 | 10 |
| 11 | 10 | (France) Pierre Gasly | Alpine-Renault | 1:21.843 | 1:21.437 | N/A | 11 |
| 12 | 24 | (China) Zhou Guanyu | Kick Sauber-Ferrari | 1:22.103 | 1:21.501 | N/A | 12 |
| 13 | 77 | (Finland) Valtteri Bottas | Kick Sauber-Ferrari | 1:21.927 | 1:21.731 | N/A | 13 |
| 14 | 22 | (Japan) Yuki Tsunoda | RB-Honda RBPT | 1:22.364 | 1:21.771 | N/A | 14 |
| 15 | 18 | (Canada) Lance Stroll | Aston Martin Aramco-Mercedes | 1:22.011 | 1:21.911 | N/A | 15 |
| 16 | 23 | (Thailand) Alexander Albon | Williams-Mercedes | 1:22.390 | N/A | N/A | 16 |
| 17 | 30 | (New Zealand) Liam Lawson | RB-Honda RBPT | 1:22.411 | N/A | N/A | 17 |
| 18 | 27 | (Germany) Nico Hülkenberg | Haas-Ferrari | 1:22.442 | N/A | N/A | 18 |
| 19 | 43 | (Argentina) Franco Colapinto | Williams-Mercedes | 1:22.594 | N/A | N/A | 19 |
| 20 | 31 | (France) Esteban Ocon | Alpine-Renault | 1:22.714 | N/A | N/A | 20 |
107% time: 1:26.927

Notes

- ^a – Max Verstappen set the fastest time in qualifying, but received a one-place grid penalty for driving unnecessarily slowly in Q3.

== Race ==
The race was held on 1 December 2024, at 19:00 local time (UTC+3), and was run 57 laps.

=== Race report ===
Max Verstappen won the race having taken the lead from George Russell at the start, ahead of Charles Leclerc, Oscar Piastri and Russell, who finished fourth despite a five-second penalty for a safety car infringement. Zhou Guanyu finished eighth to score his first points of the year for Sauber (and Sauber's only points finish of the season). Lando Norris was tenth – he was running second for much of the race before receiving a ten second stop and go penalty for ignoring yellow flags. Lewis Hamilton finished 12th after having received a drive through penalty for speeding in the pit lane. The race saw three safety cars. The first was for the lap 1 incident between Nico Hülkenberg, Franco Colapinto and Esteban Ocon, the second to clear debris from Alexander Albon's wing mirror, and the third after Hülkenberg and Sergio Pérez spun off following the end of the second safety car period.

Despite Verstappen's victory, Red Bull dropped out of contention for the World Constructors' Championship that the team had won in the previous two seasons, leaving McLaren and Ferrari with a chance to claim the title in the season finale Abu Dhabi Grand Prix.

=== Race classification ===
| Pos. | No. | Driver | Constructor | Laps | Time/Retired | Grid | Points |
|---|---|---|---|---|---|---|---|
| 1 | 1 | (Netherlands) Max Verstappen | Red Bull Racing-Honda RBPT | 57 | 1:31:05.323 | 2 | 25 |
| 2 | 16 | (Monaco) Charles Leclerc | Ferrari | 57 | +6.031 | 5 | 18 |
| 3 | 81 | (Australia) Oscar Piastri | McLaren-Mercedes | 57 | +6.819 | 4 | 15 |
| 4 | 63 | (United Kingdom) George Russell | Mercedes | 57 | +14.104^{a} | 1 | 12 |
| 5 | 10 | (France) Pierre Gasly | Alpine-Renault | 57 | +16.782 | 11 | 10 |
| 6 | 55 | (Spain) Carlos Sainz Jr. | Ferrari | 57 | +17.476 | 7 | 8 |
| 7 | 14 | (Spain) Fernando Alonso | Aston Martin Aramco-Mercedes | 57 | +19.867 | 8 | 6 |
| 8 | 24 | (China) Zhou Guanyu | Kick Sauber-Ferrari | 57 | +25.360 | 12 | 4 |
| 9 | 20 | (Denmark) Kevin Magnussen | Haas-Ferrari | 57 | +32.177 | 10 | 2 |
| 10 | 4 | (United Kingdom) Lando Norris | McLaren-Mercedes | 57 | +35.762 | 3 | 2^{b} |
| 11 | 77 | (Finland) Valtteri Bottas | Kick Sauber-Ferrari | 57 | +50.243 | 13 | |
| 12 | 44 | (United Kingdom) Lewis Hamilton | Mercedes | 57 | +56.122 | 6 | |
| 13 | 22 | (Japan) Yuki Tsunoda | RB-Honda RBPT | 57 | +1:01.100 | 14 | |
| 14 | 30 | (New Zealand) Liam Lawson | RB-Honda RBPT | 57 | +1:02.656 | 17 | |
| 15 | 23 | (Thailand) Alexander Albon | Williams-Mercedes | 56 | +1 lap | 16 | |
| Ret | 27 | (Germany) Nico Hülkenberg | Haas-Ferrari | 39 | Spun off | 18 | |
| Ret | 11 | (Mexico) Sergio Pérez | Red Bull Racing-Honda RBPT | 38 | Clutch | 9 | |
| Ret | 18 | (Canada) Lance Stroll | Aston Martin Aramco-Mercedes | 8 | Collision damage | 15 | |
| Ret | 31 | (France) Esteban Ocon | Alpine-Renault | 0 | Collision | 20 | |
| Ret | 43 | (Argentina) Franco Colapinto | Williams-Mercedes | 0 | Collision | 19 | |
Fastest lap: (United Kingdom) Lando Norris (McLaren-Mercedes) – 1:22.384 (lap 56)

Notes

- ^a – George Russell received a five-second time penalty for falling more than ten car lengths behind the safety car. His final position was not affected by the penalty.
- ^b – Includes one point for fastest lap.

== Championship standings after the race ==
Drivers' Championship standings

| Pos. | Driver | Points |
|---|---|---|
| 1 | (Netherlands) **Max Verstappen*** | 429 |
| 2 | (United Kingdom) Lando Norris | 349 |
| 3 | (Monaco) Charles Leclerc | 341 |
| 4 | (Australia) Oscar Piastri | 291 |
| 5 | (Spain) Carlos Sainz Jr. | 272 |

Constructors' Championship standings

| Pos. | Constructor | Points |
|---|---|---|
| 1 | (United Kingdom) **McLaren-Mercedes*** | 640 |
| 2 | (Italy) **Ferrari*** | 619 |
| 3 | (Austria) Red Bull Racing-Honda RBPT | 581 |
| 4 | (Germany) Mercedes | 446 |
| 5 | (United Kingdom) Aston Martin Aramco-Mercedes | 92 |

- Note: Only the top five positions are included for both sets of standings.
- Competitors marked in bold and with an asterisk still had a theoretical chance of becoming World Champion.

== See also ==
- 2024 Lusail Formula 2 round

== Notes ==
| Previous race: 2024 Las Vegas Grand Prix | FIA Formula One World Championship; 2024 season | Next race: 2024 Abu Dhabi Grand Prix |
| Previous race: 2023 Qatar Grand Prix | Qatar Grand Prix | Next race: 2025 Qatar Grand Prix |
