= 2023 Qatar Grand Prix =

Formula One motor race

Race 17 of 22 in the 2023 Formula One World Championship
← Previous race	Next race →
- Layout of the Lusail International Circuit

Race details
- Date: 8 October 2023
- Official name: Formula 1 Qatar Airways Qatar Grand Prix 2023
- Location: Lusail International Circuit; Lusail, Qatar
- Course: Permanent racing facility
- Course length: 5.419 km (3.367 miles)
- Distance: 57 laps, 308.611 km (191.762 miles)
- Weather: Clear
- Attendance: 120,000

Pole position
Driver	(Netherlands) Max Verstappen	Red Bull Racing-Honda RBPT
- Time: 1:23.778

Fastest lap
Driver	(Netherlands) Max Verstappen	Red Bull Racing-Honda RBPT
- Time: 1:24.319 on lap 56

Podium
First	(Netherlands) Max Verstappen	Red Bull Racing-Honda RBPT
Second	(Australia) Oscar Piastri	McLaren-Mercedes
Third	(United Kingdom) Lando Norris	McLaren-Mercedes

The 2023 Qatar Grand Prix (officially known as the Formula 1 Qatar Airways Qatar Grand Prix 2023) was a Formula One motor race held on 8 October 2023 at the Lusail International Circuit in Lusail, Qatar. It was the seventeenth round of the 2023 Formula One World Championship and the fourth Grand Prix weekend of the season to utilise the sprint format. Max Verstappen won his third Driver's Championship after his teammate, Sergio Pérez, crashed out in the sprint and was taken out of mathematical title contention.

Verstappen secured pole position for the race during qualifying, before finishing third in the sprint shootout behind McLaren drivers Oscar Piastri in first and Lando Norris in second, the former of whom went on to win the sprint. In the main race, Verstappen led all laps, set the fastest lap time, and won ahead of Piastri and Norris, scoring his fourth grand chelem. McLaren set the fastest pit stop record, servicing Norris in 1.80 seconds.

The drivers were severely affected by the extreme heat throughout the weekend, with several calling the race the most difficult they had ever experienced. The difficulty was also exacerbated by the last-minute implementation of an 18-lap maximum tyre stint, recommended by Pirelli and enforced by the FIA. The mandate, the first of its kind in Formula One, came in response to observations of a separation between the carcass cord and the topping compound on the tyres, which could lead to a blow out.

== Background ==
The event was held across the weekend of 6–8 October. It was the seventeenth round of the 2023 Formula One World Championship and the second running of the Qatar Grand Prix. The weekend was the fourth of six in the season to follow the sprint format. It marked the return of the Qatar Grand Prix to the World Championship after a one year absence. This was because the event was not run in 2022 in order to avoid interfering with Qatar's responsibility for hosting the 2022 FIFA World Cup. It was also the first Qatar Grand Prix to be part of a season's original schedule, as the inaugural running of the event in 2021 was held as a substitute event for the cancelled 2021 Australian Grand Prix which was cancelled because of the COVID-19 pandemic in Australia. The race was the first of a ten-year contract with the FIA until 2032.

=== Championship standings before the weekend ===
Coming into the weekend, Max Verstappen led the Drivers' Championship by 177 points from teammate Sergio Pérez, with Lewis Hamilton third, a further 33 points behind. Red Bull Racing, having secured the title at the preceding Japanese Grand Prix, led the Constructors' Championship over Mercedes by 318 points and Ferrari by a further 20 points.

==== Championship permutations ====
World Drivers' Championship leader Verstappen had an opportunity to secure his third consecutive title. He could have achieved it by finishing sixth in the sprint, with Pérez winning. Had Verstappen not scored in the sprint and Pérez had won, Verstappen would still only have had to finish eighth in the Grand Prix – regardless of Pérez's result – to win the title. Verstappen would have won the title as his advantage would have been the same as the number of remaining obtainable points in the season (146), but Pérez would not have been able to win on a tiebreaker due to Verstappen achieving more wins than Pérez, even if Pérez had gone on to win the remaining Grands Prix.

=== Entrants ===
The drivers and teams were the same as the season entry list, with the exception of Liam Lawson, who was in the seat originally held by Nyck de Vries. (Note: Nyck de Vries was originally replaced by Daniel Ricciardo from the Hungarian Grand Prix onwards. Ricciardo was subsequently replaced by Liam Lawson whilst Ricciardo recovered from a broken metacarpal bone which he suffered following a crash during the second practice of the Dutch Grand Prix.)

=== Tyre choices and safety concerns ===
Tyre supplier Pirelli brought the C1, C2 and C3 tyre compounds (designated hard, medium, and soft, respectively) for teams to use at the event.

After the free practice session and qualifying, Pirelli's analysis of the used tyres gave them concern about damage from the track's kerbs. The previous running of the event in 2021 was notable for four front-left tyre failures, which led to the retirements of two drivers. As a response, the track limits at turns 12 and 13 were altered before the sprint shootout and a ten minute acclimatisation session was added to the schedule on Saturday. The FIA stated that should the tyre concerns persist following the sprint, they would introduce a limit on the maximum number of laps that tyres could be run: 20 laps for the first set of tyres, and 22 laps for subsequent sets, including laps from previous sessions. This would require each driver to make at least three in-race pit stops for tyres.

Due to the frequency of safety cars in the sprint, the tyre data available for analysis by Pirelli was insufficient to add to that already undertaken following the previous track sessions. Before Sunday's race, the FIA amended the maximum number of laps tyres could be run to 18 laps per each set of tyres, down from 20. The mandate to perform three pit-stops was removed, although this remained the consequence of the 18 laps per tyre set rule. Laps run behind the safety car would not be counted towards a tyre's life with regards to the 18 lap limit, meaning a safety car intervention during the race could make a two stop strategy permissible. The rule marked the first time the FIA has enforced stint lengths in a Formula One race for safety reasons.

== Practice ==
The only scheduled free practice session was held on 6 October 2023, at 16:30 local time (UTC+3). Max Verstappen topped the session, followed by the Ferrari drivers Carlos Sainz Jr. and Charles Leclerc in second and third, respectively. An extra track acclimatisation session, lasting ten minutes, was held on 7 October 2023, at 16:00 local time (UTC+3), to enable drivers to get used to circuit changes made in response to tyre concerns.

== Qualifying ==
Qualifying was held on 6 October 2023, at 20:00 local time (UTC+3), and determined the starting grid order for the main race.

=== Qualifying report ===
Max Verstappen topped the first and third segment, propelling him into pole position ahead of George Russell and Lewis Hamilton. The session was affected by numerous track limits violations which negatively affected Lando Norris, Oscar Piastri and Sergio Pérez, the last of whom had set a time quick enough to get into the third segment but had it deleted.

Lance Stroll experienced another Q1 exit, and in frustration appeared to shove his personal trainer after exiting his car. In a later interview with Autosport magazine, Stroll stated that he was on good terms with his trainer and had merely acted out of frustration.

=== Qualifying classification ===
Pos.	No.	Driver	Constructor	Qualifying times			Final grid
Pos.	No.	Driver	Constructor	Q1	Q2	Q3	Final grid
1	1	(Netherlands) Max Verstappen	Red Bull Racing-Honda RBPT	1:25.007	1:24.483	1:23.778	1
2	63	(United Kingdom) George Russell	Mercedes	1:25.334	1:24.827	1:24.219	2
3	44	(United Kingdom) Lewis Hamilton	Mercedes	1:26.076	1:24.381	1:24.305	3
4	14	(Spain) Fernando Alonso	Aston Martin Aramco-Mercedes	1:25.223	1:25.241	1:24.369	4
5	16	(Monaco) Charles Leclerc	Ferrari	1:25.452	1:25.079	1:24.424	5
6	81	(Australia) Oscar Piastri	McLaren-Mercedes	1:25.266	1:24.724	1:24.540	6
7	10	(France) Pierre Gasly	Alpine-Renault	1:25.566	1:24.918	1:24.553	7
8	31	(France) Esteban Ocon	Alpine-Renault	1:25.711	1:24.928	1:24.763	8
9	77	(Finland) Valtteri Bottas	Alfa Romeo-Ferrari	1:26.038	1:25.297	1:25.058	9
10	4	(United Kingdom) Lando Norris	McLaren-Mercedes	1:25.131	1:24.685	No time	10
11	22	(Japan) Yuki Tsunoda	AlphaTauri-Honda RBPT	1:26.058	1:25.301	N/A	11
12	55	(Spain) Carlos Sainz Jr.	Ferrari	1:25.808	1:25.328	N/A	12
13	11	(Mexico) Sergio Pérez	Red Bull Racing-Honda RBPT	1:25.991	1:25.462	N/A	PL^{a}
14	23	(Thailand) Alexander Albon	Williams-Mercedes	1:26.118	1:25.707	N/A	13
15	27	(Germany) Nico Hülkenberg	Haas-Ferrari	1:25.904	1:25.783	N/A	14
16	2	(United States) Logan Sargeant	Williams-Mercedes	1:26.210	N/A	N/A	15
17	18	(Canada) Lance Stroll	Aston Martin Aramco-Mercedes	1:26.345	N/A	N/A	16
18	40	(New Zealand) Liam Lawson	AlphaTauri-Honda RBPT	1:26.635	N/A	N/A	17
19	20	(Denmark) Kevin Magnussen	Haas-Ferrari	1:27.046	N/A	N/A	18
20	24	(China) Zhou Guanyu	Alfa Romeo-Ferrari	1:27.432	N/A	N/A	19
107% time: 1:30.957

Notes

- ^a – Sergio Pérez qualified 13th, but he was required to start the race from the pit lane as the car was fitted with new power unit elements without the approval of the technical delegate during parc fermé and for the new chassis being considered a new car.

== Sprint shootout ==
The sprint shootout was originally scheduled for 7 October 2023, at 16:00 local time (UTC+3), before being postponed to 16:20 due to an extra track acclimatisation session. It determined the starting grid order for the sprint.

=== Sprint shootout report ===
Max Verstappen made a mistake which led to his track times being deleted, which opened the gates for the McLarens of Oscar Piastri and Lando Norris to punch through and take a one-two in qualification ahead of Verstappen. Meanwhile, Lance Stroll experienced another first segment elimination and Logan Sargeant's time was over the 107% rule but he was allowed to race under the stewards' discretion.

=== Sprint shootout classification ===
Pos.	No.	Driver	Constructor	Qualifying times			Sprint grid
Pos.	No.	Driver	Constructor	SQ1	SQ2	SQ3	Sprint grid
1	81	(Australia) Oscar Piastri	McLaren-Mercedes	1:25.979	1:25.496	1:24.454	1
2	4	(United Kingdom) Lando Norris	McLaren-Mercedes	1:25.672	1:24.947	1:24.536	2
3	1	(Netherlands) Max Verstappen	Red Bull Racing-Honda RBPT	1:25.510	1:25.199	1:24.646	3
4	63	(United Kingdom) George Russell	Mercedes	1:25.413	1:25.027	1:24.841	4
5	55	(Spain) Carlos Sainz Jr.	Ferrari	1:25.872	1:25.433	1:25.155	5
6	16	(Monaco) Charles Leclerc	Ferrari	1:26.266	1:25.367	1:25.247	6
7	27	(Germany) Nico Hülkenberg	Haas-Ferrari	1:26.450	1:25.499	1:25.320	7
8	11	(Mexico) Sergio Pérez	Red Bull Racing-Honda RBPT	1:26.123	1:25.143	1:25.382	8
9	14	(Spain) Fernando Alonso	Aston Martin Aramco-Mercedes	1:25.936	1:25.344	No time	9
10	31	(France) Esteban Ocon	Alpine-Renault	1:26.072	1:25.510	No time	10
11	10	(France) Pierre Gasly	Alpine-Renault	1:25.829	1:25.686	N/A	11
12	44	(United Kingdom) Lewis Hamilton	Mercedes	1:26.424	1:25.962	N/A	12
13	77	(Finland) Valtteri Bottas	Alfa Romeo-Ferrari	1:26.449	1:26.236	N/A	13
14	40	(New Zealand) Liam Lawson	AlphaTauri-Honda RBPT	1:26.202	1:26.584	N/A	14
15	24	(China) Zhou Guanyu	Alfa Romeo-Ferrari	1:26.669	1:54.546	N/A	15
16	18	(Canada) Lance Stroll	Aston Martin Aramco-Mercedes	1:26.849	N/A	N/A	16
17	23	(Thailand) Alexander Albon	Williams-Mercedes	1:26.862	N/A	N/A	17
18	22	(Japan) Yuki Tsunoda	AlphaTauri-Honda RBPT	1:26.926	N/A	N/A	18
19	20	(Denmark) Kevin Magnussen	Haas-Ferrari	1:27.438	N/A	N/A	19
107% time: 1:31.391
—	2	(United States) Logan Sargeant	Williams-Mercedes	2:05.741	N/A	N/A	20^{1}

Notes

- ^1 – Logan Sargeant failed to set a time within the 107% requirement. He was permitted to race in the sprint at the stewards' discretion.

== Sprint ==
The sprint was held on 7 October 2023, at 20:30 local time (UTC+3), and was run for 19 laps.

=== Sprint report ===
Oscar Piastri took his and McLaren's first sprint victory ahead of Max Verstappen in second and Piastri's teammate Lando Norris in third. Verstappen secured his third consecutive Formula One World Championship after his teammate Sergio Pérez crashed out and was mathematically eliminated from contention. Piastri's sprint victory was his first competitive win of any sort since his final race in Formula 2.

The sprint saw the deployment of three safety cars and five retirements. Liam Lawson and Logan Sargeant both individually spun into the gravel, and Esteban Ocon, Pérez and Nico Hülkenberg crashed together after the Alpine locked up, running into Pérez's side pod and damaging Hülkenberg's front wing and suspension. It was deemed a racing incident by the stewards and no further action was taken.

Alexander Albon, starting in seventeenth, climbed up ten places to finish seventh. The points positions were rounded off by Fernando Alonso, finishing eighth. Meanwhile, Lance Stroll and Charles Leclerc fell foul of track limits and had five seconds added to their times following the race.

=== Sprint classification ===
Pos.	No.	Driver	Constructor	Laps	Time/Retired	Grid	Points
1	81	(Australia) Oscar Piastri	McLaren-Mercedes	19	35:01.297	1	8
2	1	(Netherlands) Max Verstappen	Red Bull Racing-Honda RBPT	19	+1.871	3	7
3	4	(United Kingdom) Lando Norris	McLaren-Mercedes	19	+8.497	2	6
4	63	(United Kingdom) George Russell	Mercedes	19	+11.036	4	5
5	44	(United Kingdom) Lewis Hamilton	Mercedes	19	+17.314	12	4
6	55	(Spain) Carlos Sainz Jr.	Ferrari	19	+18.806	5	3
7	23	(Thailand) Alexander Albon	Williams-Mercedes	19	+19.864	17	2
8	14	(Spain) Fernando Alonso	Aston Martin Aramco-Mercedes	19	+21.180	9	1
9	10	(France) Pierre Gasly	Alpine-Renault	19	+21.742	11	
10	77	(Finland) Valtteri Bottas	Alfa Romeo-Ferrari	19	+22.208	13	
11	22	(Japan) Yuki Tsunoda	AlphaTauri-Honda RBPT	19	+22.863	18	
12	16	(Monaco) Charles Leclerc	Ferrari	19	+24.860^{a}	6	
13	20	(Denmark) Kevin Magnussen	Haas-Ferrari	19	+24.970	19	
14	24	(China) Zhou Guanyu	Alfa Romeo-Ferrari	19	+26.868	15	
15	18	(Canada) Lance Stroll	Aston Martin Aramco-Mercedes	19	+29.523^{b}	16	
Ret	27	(Germany) Nico Hülkenberg	Haas-Ferrari	11	Collision damage	7	
Ret	31	(France) Esteban Ocon	Alpine-Renault	10	Collision	10	
Ret	11	(Mexico) Sergio Pérez	Red Bull Racing-Honda RBPT	10	Collision	8	
Ret	2	(United States) Logan Sargeant	Williams-Mercedes	2	Spun off	20	
Ret	40	(New Zealand) Liam Lawson	AlphaTauri-Honda RBPT	0	Spun off	14	
Fastest lap: (Netherlands) Max Verstappen (Red Bull Racing-Honda RBPT) – 1:25.604 (lap 17)

Notes

- ^a – Charles Leclerc finished seventh on track, but he received a post-sprint five-second time penalty for exceeding track limits.
- ^b – Lance Stroll finished thirteenth on track, but he received a post-sprint five-second time penalty for exceeding track limits.

== Race ==
The race was held on 8 October 2023, at 20:00 local time (UTC+3), and was run for 57 laps.

=== Race report ===
Prior to the race, a fuel leak in Carlos Sainz Jr.'s car was discovered which prevented him from starting the race. This left his starting grid box empty and Nico Hülkenberg mistakenly took Sainz's grid box in the starting position, resulting in a penalty. Lewis Hamilton retired from the race after turning into the Mercedes of George Russell at the first corner on lap 1, breaking the hub off his wheel and spinning into the gravel trap. The incident forced the safety car to be deployed in order to allow the marshals to remove his car and clear the debris safely. The safety car period ended on lap 4. Max Verstappen led all laps, recorded the fastest lap and won the race ahead of Oscar Piastri and Lando Norris, who both recovered from lower grid positions, resulting in the McLaren team's 500th and 501st podiums. Meanwhile, Verstappen's teammate Sergio Pérez started from the pit lane, received a penalty for track limits, and recovered to tenth after Lance Stroll received a penalty.

The race was run in challenging, hot conditions: in particular, Esteban Ocon vomited in his car twice but managed to finish the race in seventh, while Logan Sargeant chose to retire due to heat stroke and dehydration, exacerbated by flu-like symptoms he already had coming into the weekend. Sargeant's teammate Alexander Albon was also sent to the medical centre after the race due to heat exposure. Lance Stroll also went directly to the medical centre after the race, and said he was "passing out" in the car and suffered blurred vision. Russell said he was close to losing consciousness at the end of the race. Many drivers, including Piastri, Charles Leclerc, Russell, Ocon, Verstappen, and Norris said it was the most physically demanding race of their careers.

McLaren, servicing Norris, set the new record for the fastest pit stop completed in 1.80 seconds. The previous record was set at the 2019 Brazilian Grand Prix by Red Bull Racing at 1.82 seconds, servicing Verstappen.

=== Race classification ===
Pos.	No.	Driver	Constructor	Laps	Time/Retired	Grid	Points
1	1	(Netherlands) Max Verstappen	Red Bull Racing-Honda RBPT	57	1:27:39.168	1	26^{a}
2	81	(Australia) Oscar Piastri	McLaren-Mercedes	57	+4.833	6	18
3	4	(United Kingdom) Lando Norris	McLaren-Mercedes	57	+5.969	10	15
4	63	(United Kingdom) George Russell	Mercedes	57	+34.119	2	12
5	16	(Monaco) Charles Leclerc	Ferrari	57	+38.976	5	10
6	14	(Spain) Fernando Alonso	Aston Martin Aramco-Mercedes	57	+49.032	4	8
7	31	(France) Esteban Ocon	Alpine-Renault	57	+1:02.390	8	6
8	77	(Finland) Valtteri Bottas	Alfa Romeo-Ferrari	57	+1:06.563	9	4
9	24	(China) Zhou Guanyu	Alfa Romeo-Ferrari	57	+1:16.127	19	2
10	11	(Mexico) Sergio Pérez	Red Bull Racing-Honda RBPT	57	+1:20.181^{b}	PL	1
11	18	(Canada) Lance Stroll	Aston Martin Aramco-Mercedes	57	+1:21.652^{c}	16	
12	10	(France) Pierre Gasly	Alpine-Renault	57	+1:22.300^{d}	7	
13	23	(Thailand) Alexander Albon	Williams-Mercedes	57	+1:31.014^{e}	13	
14	20	(Denmark) Kevin Magnussen	Haas-Ferrari	56	+1 lap	18	
15	22	(Japan) Yuki Tsunoda	AlphaTauri-Honda RBPT	56	+1 lap	11	
16	27	(Germany) Nico Hülkenberg	Haas-Ferrari	56	+1 lap	12^{f}	
17	40	(New Zealand) Liam Lawson	AlphaTauri-Honda RBPT	56	+1 lap	17	
Ret	2	(United States) Logan Sargeant	Williams-Mercedes	40	Heatstroke	15	
Ret	44	(United Kingdom) Lewis Hamilton	Mercedes	0	Collision	3	
DNS	55	(Spain) Carlos Sainz Jr.	Ferrari	0	Fuel leak	–^{g}	
Fastest lap: (Netherlands) Max Verstappen (Red Bull Racing-Honda RBPT) – 1:24.319 (lap 56)

Notes

- ^a – Includes one point for fastest lap.
- ^b – Sergio Pérez finished eleventh, but he received a five-second time penalty for exceeding track limits. He gained a position following Lance Stroll's penalty.
- ^c – Lance Stroll finished ninth, but he received two five-second time penalties for exceeding track limits.
- ^d – Pierre Gasly finished tenth, but he received two five-second time penalties for exceeding track limits.
- ^e – Alexander Albon received two five-second time penalties for exceeding track limits. His final position was not affected by the penalty.
- ^f – Nico Hülkenberg was due to start the race from fourteenth place, but he erroneously started from the twelfth grid slot which had been left vacant by Carlos Sainz Jr. being unable to start. He received a ten-second time penalty for the infraction.
- ^g – Carlos Sainz Jr. did not start the race due to a fuel leak. His place on the grid was erroneously occupied by Nico Hülkenberg who left the fourteenth place vacant.

== Championship standings after the race ==
Drivers' Championship standings

Pos.	Driver	Points
1	(Netherlands) **Max Verstappen***	433
2	(Mexico) Sergio Pérez	224
3	(United Kingdom) Lewis Hamilton	194
4	(Spain) Fernando Alonso	183
5	(Spain) Carlos Sainz Jr.	153

Constructors' Championship standings

Pos.	Constructor	Points
1	(Austria) **Red Bull Racing-Honda RBPT***	657
2	(Germany) Mercedes	326
3	(Italy) Ferrari	298
4	(United Kingdom) Aston Martin Aramco-Mercedes	230
5	(United Kingdom) McLaren-Mercedes	219

- Note: Only the top five positions are included for both sets of standings.
- Competitors in bold and with an asterisk are the 2023 World Champions.

== Notes ==
Previous race: 2023 Japanese Grand Prix	FIA Formula One World Championship; 2023 season	Next race: 2023 United States Grand Prix
Previous race: 2021 Qatar Grand Prix	Qatar Grand Prix	Next race: 2024 Qatar Grand Prix
