= FIA Super Licence =

Driver's qualification

Logo of Fédération Internationale de l'Automobile (FIA)

The FIA Super Licence is a driver's qualification that allows the holder to compete in the Formula One World Championship. It is issued and managed by the Fédération Internationale de l'Automobile (FIA).

== Requirements ==
=== Super Licence ===
The FIA Racing Super Licence was introduced in 1984 to prevent less-qualified drivers from participating in Formula 1, before being revamped in 2015, following the debut of Max Verstappen. To qualify, an applicant must meet the requirements of the FIA's International Sporting Code, Appendix L, Article 13. As of October 2025, the article states:

1. An existing holder of an International Grade A competition licence (covered in FIA ISC Appendix L, Article 11).
2. A minimum age of 18 at the start of their first F1 competition, though it can be issued in exceptional circumstances under the discretion of the FIA at age 17.
3. Pass an FIA theory test on knowledge of the F1 sporting codes and regulations when applying for the first time. (Note: For any subsequent applications, the driver's team needs to certify that they have held a briefing about the most important points of the International Sporting Code and of the F1 Sporting Regulations.)
4. Completed at least 80% of each of two full seasons of any of the Championships reported in Supplement 1 of the regulations.
5. Accumulated at least 40 points over the previous three seasons in any combination of the championships reported in Supplement 1 of the regulations.

Additionally, if a driver has previously held a super licence, they must meet one of the following requirements instead:

- A driver who has held a valid super licence for any of the previous three seasons is eligible for a new licence if they have completed 100 km in a free practice session in the last 3 years.
- A driver who has previously held a super licence but has not held a valid licence within the previous three years can be granted an exemption by the FIA on the grounds of "recent and consistent demonstration" of "outstanding ability in single-seater formula cars".

In response to the COVID-19 pandemic, Requirement 5 was amended to allow the three best-scoring seasons from a driver's previous four seasons to count, provided the three-season window includes 2021. If a driver accumulated at least 30 points and competed in any of the Championships reported in Supplement 1 and was unable to accumulate the 40 points due to "circumstances outside their control or reasons of force majeure", the licence could be granted at the discretion of the FIA. In June 2024, the FIA further modified the rules so that drivers were no longer required to hold a road-legal driving licence in order to apply for a super licence.

As of March 2026, the Supplement 1 Super Licence points, which also qualify for the 80% rule, are awarded according to the following table:

Series	Championship position									
Series	1st	2nd	3rd	4th	5th	6th	7th	8th	9th	10th
FIA Formula 2 Championship	40	40	40	30	20	10	8	6	4	3
IndyCar Series (Note: Subject to 'road course' rounds being held on FIA-homologated circuits. (List of motor racing circuits by FIA grade for a full list))	40	30	25	20	15	10	8	6	3	1
IndyCar Series (old points before 2026, expires post-2028)	40	30	20	10	8	6	4	3	2	1
FIA Formula 3 Championship	30	25	20	15	12	9	7	5	3	2
FIA Formula E World Championship	30	25	20	10	8	6	4	3	2	1
FIA World Endurance Championship – Hypercar	30	24	20	16	12	10	8	6	4	2
Super Formula Championship	30	25	20	15	12	9	7	5	3	2
Super Formula Championship (old points before 2025, expires post-2027)	25	20	15	10	7	5	3	2	1	0
Formula Regional European Championship	25	20	15	10	7	5	3	2	1	0
FIA World Endurance Championship – LMP2 (folded 2023, expires post-2026)	20	16	12	10	8	6	4	2	0	0
Super GT500	20	16	12	10	7	5	3	2	1	0
IMSA – GTP	20	16	12	10	7	5	3	2	1	0
Formula Regional Middle East Trophy	18	14	12	10	6	4	3	2	1	0
Formula Regional Americas Championship	18	14	12	10	6	4	3	2	1	0
Formula Regional Japanese Championship	18	14	12	10	6	4	3	2	1	0
Formula Regional Oceania Trophy	18	14	12	10	6	4	3	2	1	0
Supercars Championship	15	12	10	7	5	3	2	1	0	0
NASCAR Cup Series	15	12	10	7	5	3	2	1	0	0
Indy NXT	15	12	10	7	5	3	2	1	0	0
Euroformula Open	15	12	10	7	5	3	2	1	0	0
Super Formula Lights	15	12	10	7	5	3	2	1	0	0
FIA Formula 4 Championships (Note: The driver must be at least 15 years old. If a driver competes in this FIA certified competition while under the age of 15, they will be ineligible for any Super Licence points in the current and the following two years.) (Note: For 2023 only, Formula 4 South East Asia certified by the FIA is awarded 50% of the points listed in table, on completion of three (3) events using two (2) track layouts, and Formula 4 India certified by the FIA is awarded 100% of the points listed in table, on completion of four (4) events using two (2) track layouts.)	12	10	7	5	3	2	1	0	0	0
FIA World Endurance Championship – LMGT3	12	10	7	5	3	2	1	0	0	0
ALMS / ELMS / IMSA – LMP2	10	8	6	4	2	0	0	0	0	0
FIA World Endurance Championship – LMGTE Am (folded 2023, expires post-2026)	10	8	6	4	2	0	0	0	0	0
IMSA – GTD Pro (removed post-2023, expires post-2026)	10	8	6	4	2	0	0	0	0	0
F1 Academy	10	7	5	3	1	0	0	0	0	0
USF Pro 2000 Championship	10	7	5	3	1	0	0	0	0	0
GB3 Championship	10	7	5	3	1	0	0	0	0	0
Eurocup-3	10	7	5	3	1	0	0	0	0	0
NASCAR O'Reilly Auto Parts Series	10	7	5	3	1	0	0	0	0	0
NASCAR Craftsman Truck Series	10	7	5	3	1	0	0	0	0	0
International GT3 Series	6	4	2	0	0	0	0	0	0	0
Super GT300	6	4	2	0	0	0	0	0	0	0
Deutsche Tourenwagen Masters	6	4	2	0	0	0	0	0	0	0
Deutsche Tourenwagen Masters (old points before 2025, expires post-2027)	15	12	10	7	5	3	2	1	0	0
FIA Karting World Championships Senior (Note: A driver can accumulate a maximum of 12 points in FIA karting Championships. Points from karting are valid for five years.)	4	3	2	1	0	0	0	0	0	0
FIA Karting Continental Championships Senior	3	2	1	0	0	0	0	0	0	0
FIA Karting World Championships Junior	3	2	1	0	0	0	0	0	0	0
FIA Karting Continental Championships Junior	2	1	0	0	0	0	0	0	0	0

Points are awarded according to the applicable regulatory text of the year in which the final championship result has been achieved.

For a series to award Super Licence points, a championship season must consist of at least five events spanning at least three different circuits, with alternative circuit configurations considered to be separate circuits. Additionally, if less than sixteen drivers start the first race of an event, the number of points awarded will decrease by 10% per driver below the minimum (90% points if fifteen drivers start, 80% points if fourteen drivers start, etc.). If fewer than sixteen drivers start the first race of multiple events, then the event with the lowest number of drivers will be used for the above calculation.

A driver can earn points from either one or two series in a calendar year. The results from a maximum of two championships can be accumulated from a single calendar year, provided that the start date of the second championship falls after the end date of the first championship during the year in question.

Drivers may also earn additional points for:

- 1 point – driving at least 100 km during a Free Practice session for up to 10 points (with one point awarded per World Championship event).
- 2 points – completing an FIA Championship with a penalty points system without receiving any penalty points.
- 2 points – winning the Macau Grand Prix (F4).
- 3 points – winning the Macau Grand Prix (FR).
- 5 points – winning the Macau Grand Prix (F3).

If multiple drivers complete a season competing in the same car they will be awarded a fraction of their points according to their FIA Driver Categorisation:

1. FIA Platinum Categorisation and FIA Gold Categorisation ranked drivers – 100% of the points received.
2. Silver ranked drivers – 75% of the points received.
3. Bronze ranked drivers – 50% of the points received.
4. Drivers without a categorisation will be awarded no points.

=== Free Practice Only Super Licence ===
Beginning in the 2019 Formula One season, the FIA introduced a requirement for drivers participating in free practice sessions to hold a stand-alone Free Practice Only Super Licence, with the holding of a standard Super Licence not automatically granting a Free Practice Only Super Licence. The criteria are as follows:

1. A minimum age of 18 at the start of their first F1 competition.
2. An existing holder of an International Grade A competition licence.
3. Passing of an FIA theory test on knowledge of the F1 sporting codes and regulations when applying for the first time.
4. Completion of either six races in Formula 2, or accumulated 25 Super Licence points in eligible championships during the previous three years, when applying for the first time. (Note: All subsequent applications require the completion of either a full season in Formula 2, or accumulated 25 Super Licence points in eligible championships during the previous three years.)

== Renewal, sanctions, and costs ==
=== Probation periods and renewal ===
The FIA issue licences subject to a 12-month probation period after first issue which applies to full and free practice licences. At any time during the first 12 months the FIA may review and withdraw a super licence if the standards to continue holding a licence are not being met. Super Licences are issued on an annual calendar year basis and must be renewed at the end of each year.

In 2006, Yuji Ide had his licence revoked, following a crash at the 2006 San Marino Grand Prix, after which the FIA determined that he did not have enough experience to warrant having a Super Licence.

=== Sanctions ===
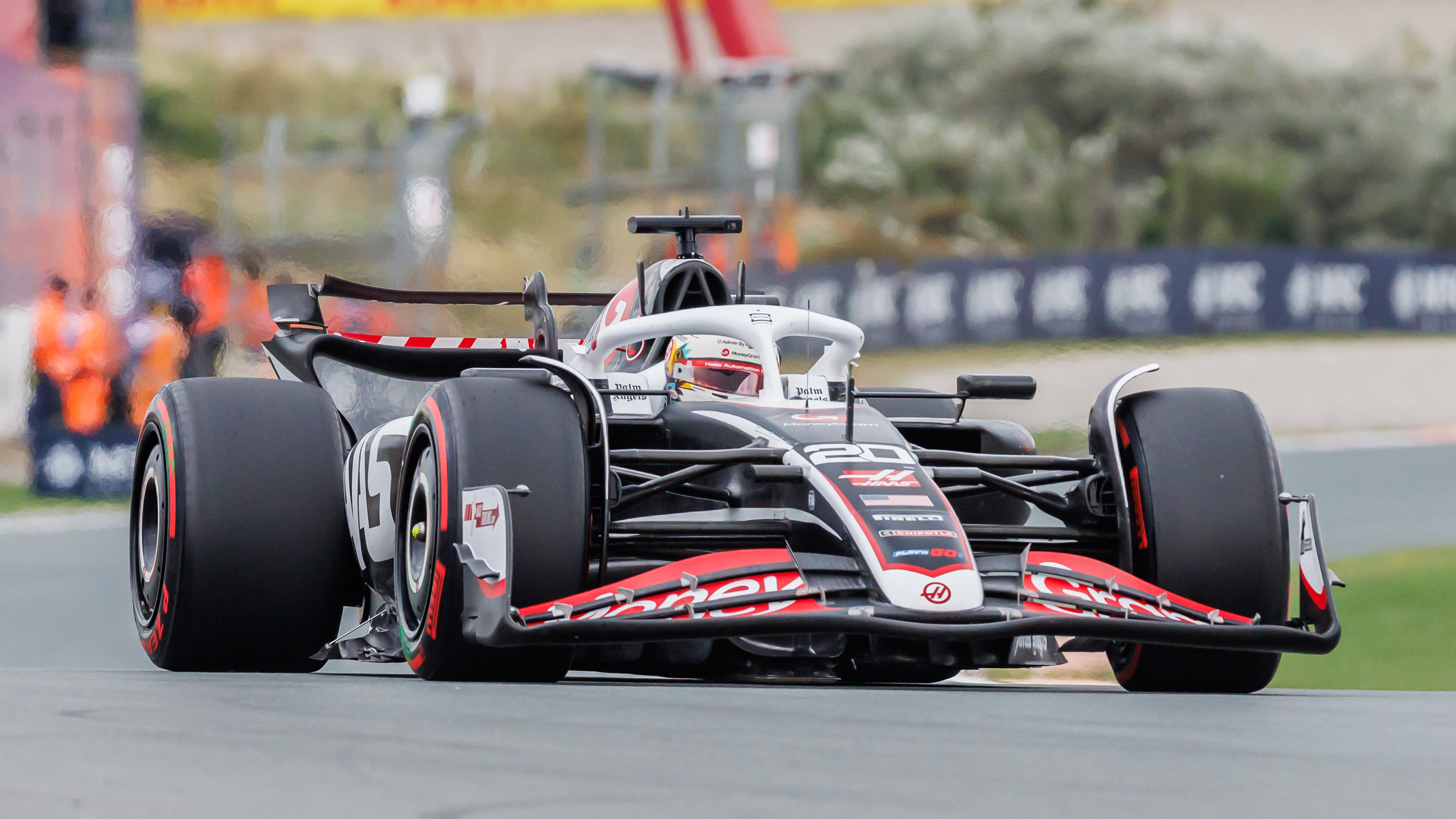
Kevin Magnussen (2024) is the only driver to receive a race ban via the penalty points system.

Drivers accrue penalty points and reprimands on their Super Licence for driving infractions. If a driver accumulates five reprimands over the course of a season, the FIA may impose a grid penalty and penalty points. Since 2014, a total of 12 penalty points in a 12-month period has resulted in a one-race ban. The only race ban to ever be enforced via this methodology was Kevin Magnussen's for the 2024 Azerbaijan Grand Prix.

==== Active penalty points ====
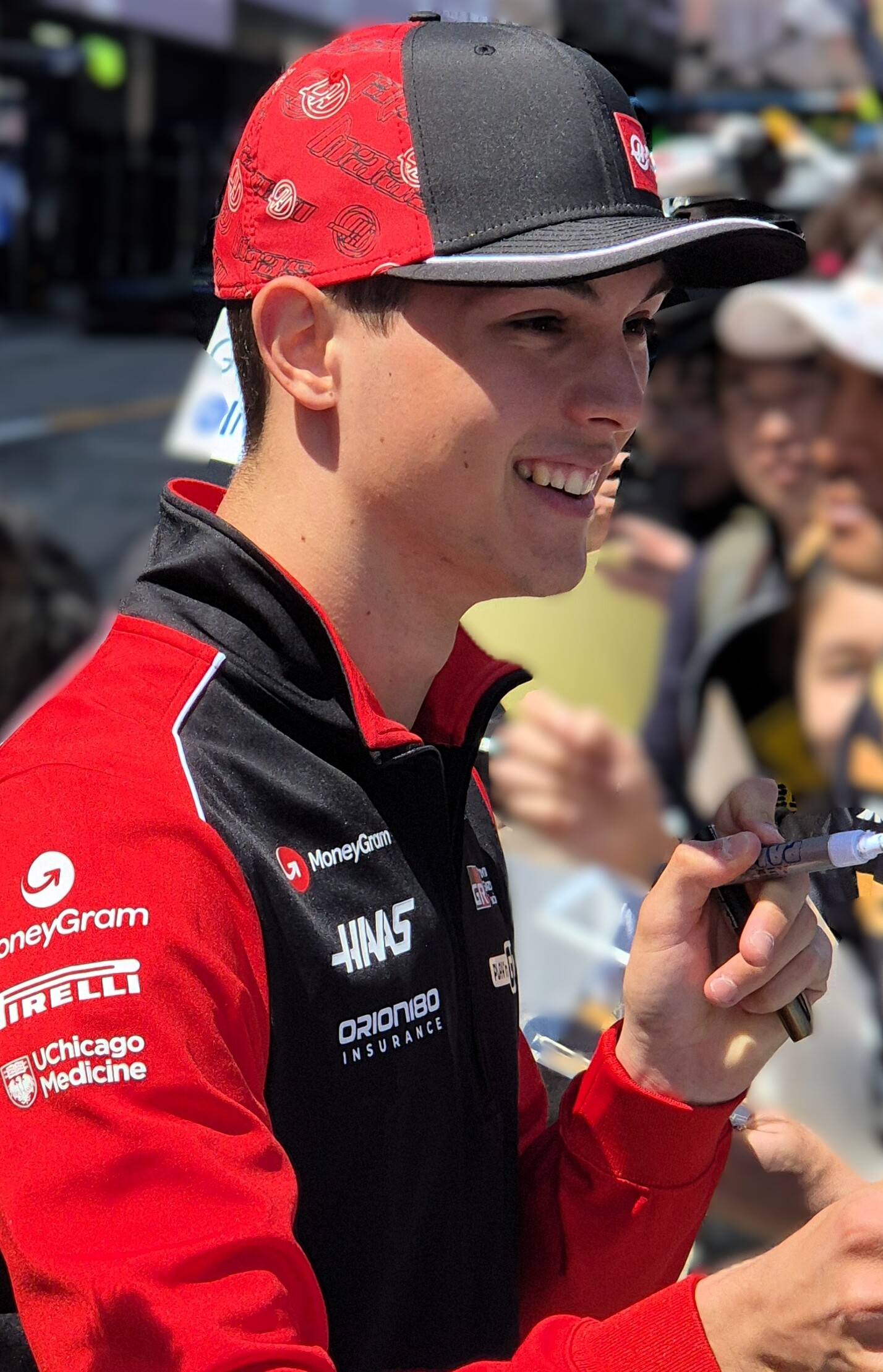
Oliver Bearman of Haas (top) and Franco Colapinto of Alpine (bottom) have the most active penalty points at 4 each.

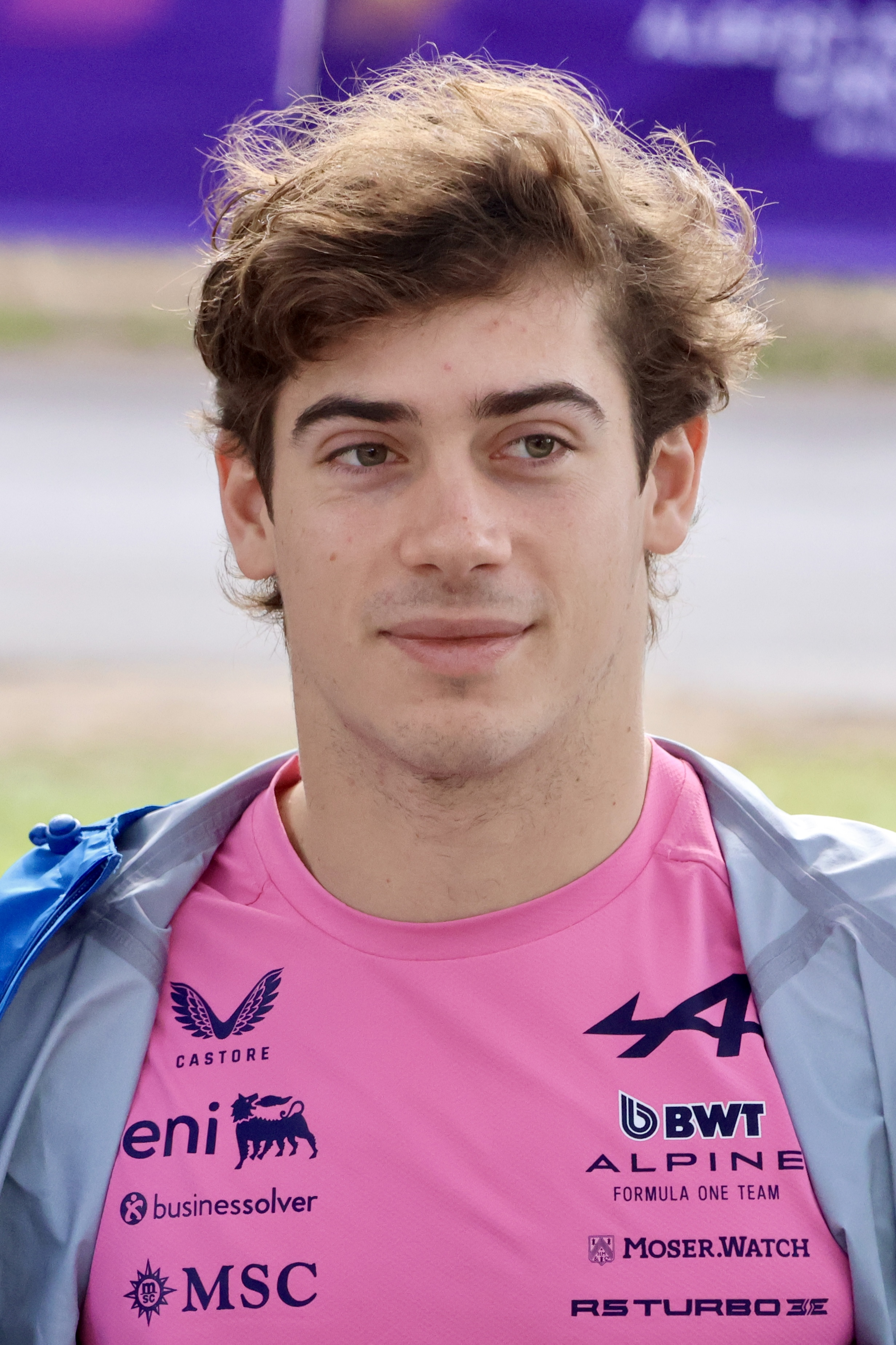

As of the 2026 Italian Grand Prix:

Driver	Team(s)	Points	Until
(United Kingdom) Oliver Bearman	(United States) Haas	4	2026 Italian Grand Prix
(Argentina) Franco Colapinto	(France) Alpine	4	14 June 2027
(Thailand) Alexander Albon	(United Kingdom) Williams	3	2026 Spanish Grand Prix
(Canada) Lance Stroll	(United Kingdom) Aston Martin	3	2026 Singapore Grand Prix
(New Zealand) Liam Lawson	(Italy) Racing Bulls (Austria) Red Bull Racing	3	2026 São Paulo Grand Prix
(Japan) Yuki Tsunoda	(Italy) Racing Bulls (Austria) Red Bull Racing‡	3	2026 São Paulo Grand Prix
(Italy) Kimi Antonelli	(Germany) Mercedes	2	2026 Italian Grand Prix
(Spain) Carlos Sainz Jr.	(United Kingdom) Williams	2	2026 Singapore Grand Prix
(Australia) Oscar Piastri	(United Kingdom) McLaren	2	2026 São Paulo Grand Prix
(Brazil) Gabriel Bortoleto	(Germany) Audi	2	2026 Las Vegas Grand Prix
(United Kingdom) Arvid Lindblad	(Italy) Racing Bulls	2	23 August 2027
(France) Esteban Ocon	(United States) Haas	1	2026 Italian Grand Prix
(United Kingdom) Lewis Hamilton	(Italy) Ferrari	1	2026 São Paulo Grand Prix

^{†} Not an active competitor.
^{‡} No longer competing for the team.

=== Costs ===
The FIA charges the licence holder an annual fee. According to a report from the BBC, the cost of maintaining a super licence rose by an average of £8,700 in 2009, with an extra charge of €2,100 per point earned in 2008—up from €447 per point in 2007. In 2009, Lewis Hamilton paid £242,000 for his licence for the season.

Increasing the cost of the super licence represented a significant policy shift for the FIA's then-president Max Mosley, who wrote in February 2009 that drivers should "race elsewhere if they were unable to pay for their super licences" in response to reports that drivers were unhappy with the cost of their super licences and even refusing to sign their super licence contracts. Later on March 23, after Mosley met with representatives from the Grand Prix Drivers' Association, the FIA issued a statement: "Following a very positive meeting between FIA President Max Mosley and representatives of the Grand Prix Drivers' Association (GPDA), a proposal will be made to the World Motor Sport Council to revise super licence fees for drivers in the 2010 championship".

In November 2012, however, the FIA announced that it would increase the cost of the super licence once again. According to McLaren team principal Martin Whitmarsh, the proposed increase would lead to a basic fee of €10,000 ($12,800) for the super licence plus €1,000 ($1,280) for each World Championship point. 2009 Formula 1 World Driver's Champion Jenson Button objected to the increase, and expressed his position that all current F1 drivers should pay the same flat fee for their super licences:

Personally I don't feel that we should be paying different super licence fees for different drivers and different point situations. I mean, when you get your licence to drive on the road, because you do more miles you don't pay more for it, do you? And you don't pay more for a licence in any other category because you've got a better car or whatever, so it should be a flat fee.

— Jenson Button

Button's super licence fee for the 2010 season, based on his 2009 results, were variously reported on, with one source claiming he spent "over a quarter of a million Euros to race that year!" and other sources raising that claim to approximately €1M ($1.28M).

As of December 2024, the basic fee for a super licence is €11,453 with estimates that the per-point fee has also risen to €2,313. Max Verstappen paid a record €1,217,900 for his 2024 Super Licence, based on his 2023 results.

== Nationality of drivers ==
The nationality that appears on the racing licence is identical to a driver's passport. This is not necessarily the same as the country issuing the racing licence. A French national living in Germany would receive a licence issued by the German motorsport authorities, but the nationality displayed on the licence would still be French. In order to race with a licence that displays German, the driver would need to have a German passport as well. Drivers with multiple citizenship choose their "official" nationality.

As a result of this rule, several mistakes have occurred on official entry lists and podium ceremonies that were issued or organized by the FIA or race organisers. These include British driver John Watson being mistakenly identified under the Irish nationality by some official Grand Prix entry lists, and Eddie Irvine, a British citizen who held a racing licence issued by the National Sporting Authority of the Republic of Ireland, being listed as an Irish national on the official entry lists for the 1995 and 1996 seasons. The latter resulted in confusion surrounding Irvine's nationality, with the flag of Ireland being flown during his podium appearances at the 1995 Canadian Grand Prix, 1996 Australian Grand Prix, 1997 Argentine Grand Prix and 1997 Monaco Grand Prix.

This rule, however, has not been in force since the beginning of the Formula One World Championship. In the past, the choice of nationality was up to the driver. For instance, Jochen Rindt chose to race in Formula One under the Austrian flag despite being born in Germany and not possessing Austrian citizenship, as he competed with a licence issued by the Austrian National Sporting Authority during his career.
