= 2024 Azerbaijan Grand Prix =

Formula One motor race

Race 17 of 24 in the 2024 Formula One World Championship
← Previous race	Next race →
- Layout of the Baku City Circuit

Race details
- Date: 15 September 2024
- Official name: Formula 1 Qatar Airways Azerbaijan Grand Prix 2024
- Location: Baku City Circuit; Baku, Azerbaijan
- Course: Street circuit
- Course length: 6.003 km (3.730 miles)
- Distance: 51 laps, 306.049 km (190.170 miles)
- Weather: Sunny
- Attendance: 76,000

Pole position
Driver	(Monaco) Charles Leclerc	Ferrari
- Time: 1:41.365

Fastest lap
Driver	(United Kingdom) Lando Norris	McLaren-Mercedes
- Time: 1:45.255 on lap 42

Podium
First	(Australia) Oscar Piastri	McLaren-Mercedes
Second	(Monaco) Charles Leclerc	Ferrari
Third	(United Kingdom) George Russell	Mercedes

The 2024 Azerbaijan Grand Prix (officially known as the Formula 1 Qatar Airways Azerbaijan Grand Prix 2024) was a Formula One motor race held on 15 September 2024 at the Baku City Circuit in Baku, Azerbaijan. It was the seventeenth round of the 2024 Formula One World Championship.

Charles Leclerc of Ferrari took pole position for the event for the fourth year in a row, but lost out to Oscar Piastri of McLaren for the win and finished second, as Piastri took his second win in Formula One. George Russell inherited the final podium slot after Leclerc's teammate Carlos Sainz Jr. and Red Bull Racing's Sergio Pérez both crashed out on the penultimate lap while fighting for third and took themselves out of the race. Lando Norris recovered from a 15th-place start to finish fourth and take the fastest lap, one position over championship rival Max Verstappen.

The result saw McLaren take the lead in the Constructors' Championship ahead of Red Bull Racing by 20 points, the first time they had led the standings since the 2014 Australian Grand Prix, while Norris reduced his points deficit to Verstappen to 59 points.

== Background ==
The event was held at the Baku City Circuit in Baku for the eighth time in the circuit's history, having previously held one edition of the European Grand Prix in 2016, across the weekend of 13–15 September. Including the aforementioned European Grand Prix, which was held in June, this was the first Azerbaijan Grand Prix to be run in September, taking the place of the Japanese Grand Prix which moved to April from its traditional schedule between September and November; previous editions of the race ran during the first half of the season, between April and June. The move was part of Formula One's regionalisation efforts, scheduling the Azerbaijan Grand Prix as the first round after the European races. The Grand Prix was the seventeenth round of the 2024 Formula One World Championship and the seventh running of the Azerbaijan Grand Prix.

=== Championship standings before the race ===
Going into the weekend, Max Verstappen led the Drivers' Championship with 303 points, 62 points ahead of Lando Norris in second, and 86 ahead of Charles Leclerc in third. Red Bull Racing, with 446 points, led the Constructors' Championship from McLaren and Ferrari, who are second and third with 438 and 407 points, respectively.

=== Entrants ===
The drivers and teams were the same as the season entry list with two exceptions: Franco Colapinto replaced Logan Sargeant at Williams from the preceding Italian Grand Prix onwards, while Kevin Magnussen of Haas was given a one-race ban at the previous round, having caused a collision that put him over the limit of twelve penalty points within twelve months. Magnussen was replaced by reserve driver Oliver Bearman, who had last competed at the Saudi Arabian Grand Prix earlier in the season when he was substituted in for Ferrari.

=== Tyre choices ===
Sole tyre supplier Pirelli brought the C3, C4, and C5 tyre compounds (the three softest in their range) designated hard, medium, and soft, respectively, for teams to use at this event.

=== Track changes ===
The DRS zone leading in to turn 1 was extended by 100 metres (330 ft).

== Practice ==
Three free practice sessions were held for the event. The first free practice session was held on 13 September 2024, at 13:30 local time (UTC+4), and was topped by Max Verstappen of Red Bull Racing ahead of Lewis Hamilton of Mercedes and Verstappen's teammate Sergio Pérez. The session saw three red flags be flown, the first for debris, the second for an accident involving Charles Leclerc of Ferrari at turn 15, and the third for a crash involving Franco Colapinto of Williams at turn 4. The second free practice session was held on the same day, at 17:00 local time, and was topped by Leclerc ahead of Pérez and Hamilton.

The third practice session was held on 14 September 2024, at 12:30 local time, and was topped by George Russell of Mercedes ahead of Leclerc and Lando Norris of McLaren. The session was red-flagged twice; firstly for Esteban Ocon of Alpine stopping on track due to an engine issue, secondly for Oliver Bearman of Haas crashing at turn 1.

== Qualifying ==
Qualifying was held on 14 September 2024, at 16:00 local time (UTC+4).

=== Qualifying classification ===
Pos.	No.	Driver	Constructor	Qualifying times			Final grid
Pos.	No.	Driver	Constructor	Q1	Q2	Q3	Final grid
1	16	(Monaco) Charles Leclerc	Ferrari	1:42.775	1:42.056	1:41.365	1
2	81	(Australia) Oscar Piastri	McLaren-Mercedes	1:43.033	1:42.598	1:41.686	2
3	55	(Spain) Carlos Sainz Jr.	Ferrari	1:43.357	1:42.503	1:41.805	3
4	11	(Mexico) Sergio Pérez	Red Bull Racing-Honda RBPT	1:43.213	1:42.263	1:41.813	4
5	63	(United Kingdom) George Russell	Mercedes	1:43.139	1:42.329	1:41.874	5
6	1	(Netherlands) Max Verstappen	Red Bull Racing-Honda RBPT	1:43.097	1:42.042	1:42.023	6
7	44	(United Kingdom) Lewis Hamilton	Mercedes	1:43.089	1:42.765	1:42.289	PL^{a}
8	14	(Spain) Fernando Alonso	Aston Martin Aramco-Mercedes	1:43.472	1:42.426	1:42.369	7
9	43	(Argentina) Franco Colapinto	Williams-Mercedes	1:43.138	1:42.473	1:42.530	8
10	23	(Thailand) Alexander Albon	Williams-Mercedes	1:42.899	1:42.840	1:42.859	9
11	50	(United Kingdom) Oliver Bearman	Haas-Ferrari	1:43.471	1:42.968	N/A	10
12	22	(Japan) Yuki Tsunoda	RB-Honda RBPT	1:43.337	1:43.035	N/A	11
13	27	(Germany) Nico Hülkenberg	Haas-Ferrari	1:43.101	1:43.191	N/A	12
14	18	(Canada) Lance Stroll	Aston Martin Aramco-Mercedes	1:43.370	1:43.404	N/A	13
15	3	(Australia) Daniel Ricciardo	RB-Honda RBPT	1:43.547	N/A	N/A	14
16	4	(United Kingdom) Lando Norris	McLaren-Mercedes	1:43.609	N/A	N/A	15
17	77	(Finland) Valtteri Bottas	Kick Sauber-Ferrari	1:43.618	N/A	N/A	16
18	24	(China) Zhou Guanyu	Kick Sauber-Ferrari	1:44.246	N/A	N/A	17^{b}
19	31	(France) Esteban Ocon	Alpine-Renault	1:44.504	N/A	N/A	PL^{c}
DSQ	10	(France) Pierre Gasly	Alpine-Renault	1:43.088	1:43.179	N/A	18^{d}
107% time: 1:49.969

Notes

- ^a – Lewis Hamilton qualified seventh, but was required to start the race from the pit lane for replacing power unit elements without the approval of the technical delegate during parc fermé.
- ^b – Zhou Guanyu was required to start the race from the back of the grid for exceeding his quota of power unit elements.
- ^c – Esteban Ocon qualified 19th, but was required to start the race from the pit lane for replacing power unit elements without the approval of the technical delegate during parc fermé.
- ^d – Pierre Gasly initially qualified 13th, but was subsequently disqualified as his car exceeded the instantaneous fuel mass flow limit in Q2. He was permitted to race at the stewards' discretion.

== Race ==
The race was held on 15 September 2024, at 15:00 local time (UTC+4), and was run for 51 laps.

=== Race report ===
The race was won by McLaren's Oscar Piastri, who took his second career win. Ferrari's Charles Leclerc and George Russell, driving for Mercedes, rounded out the podium. McLaren's other driver, Lando Norris, obtained the fastest lap point and recovered from his fifteenth place start to finish fourth. With Red Bull driver Max Verstappen finishing fifth, and his teammate Sergio Pérez retiring, Red Bull lost the lead of the Constructors' championship to McLaren, marking the first time since the 2022 Miami Grand Prix that Red Bull did not lead the Constructors' Championship, and the first time that McLaren led the Constructors' Championship since the 2014 Australian Grand Prix. Both Williams drivers scored a season-best finish of seventh and eighth, respectively, marking their best finish since the 2021 Hungarian Grand Prix, and Franco Colapinto's four points made him the first Argentine driver to score a point since Carlos Reutemann at the 1982 South African Grand Prix. The race was neutralised on lap 50 after a collision, later deemed a shared-fault racing incident by the stewards, between Carlos Sainz Jr. and Sergio Pérez, causing both to retire and the race to end under the virtual safety car.

=== Race classification ===
Pos.	No.	Driver	Constructor	Laps	Time/Retired	Grid	Points
1	81	(Australia) Oscar Piastri	McLaren-Mercedes	51	1:32:58.007	2	25
2	16	(Monaco) Charles Leclerc	Ferrari	51	+10.910	1	18
3	63	(United Kingdom) George Russell	Mercedes	51	+31.328	5	15
4	4	(United Kingdom) Lando Norris	McLaren-Mercedes	51	+36.143	15	13^{a}
5	1	(Netherlands) Max Verstappen	Red Bull Racing-Honda RBPT	51	+1:17.098	6	10
6	14	(Spain) Fernando Alonso	Aston Martin Aramco-Mercedes	51	+1:25.468	7	8
7	23	(Thailand) Alexander Albon	Williams-Mercedes	51	+1:27.396	9	6
8	43	(Argentina) Franco Colapinto	Williams-Mercedes	51	+1:29.541	8	4
9	44	(United Kingdom) Lewis Hamilton	Mercedes	51	+1:32.396	PL	2
10	50	(United Kingdom) Oliver Bearman	Haas-Ferrari	51	+1:33.127	10	1
11	27	(Germany) Nico Hülkenberg	Haas-Ferrari	51	+1:33.465	12	
12	10	(France) Pierre Gasly	Alpine-Renault	51	+1:57.189	18	
13	3	(Australia) Daniel Ricciardo	RB-Honda RBPT	51	+2:26.907	14	
14	24	(China) Zhou Guanyu	Kick Sauber-Ferrari	51	+2:28.841	17	
15	31	(France) Esteban Ocon	Alpine-Renault	50	+1 lap	PL	
16	77	(Finland) Valtteri Bottas	Kick Sauber-Ferrari	50	+1 lap	16	
17^{b}	11	(Mexico) Sergio Pérez	Red Bull Racing-Honda RBPT	49	Collision	4	
18^{b}	55	(Spain) Carlos Sainz Jr.	Ferrari	49	Collision	3	
19^{g}	18	(Canada) Lance Stroll	Aston Martin Aramco-Mercedes	45	Brakes	13	
Ret	22	(Japan) Yuki Tsunoda	RB-Honda RBPT	14	Collision damage	11	
Fastest lap: (United Kingdom) Lando Norris (McLaren-Mercedes) – 1:45.255 (lap 42)

Notes

- ^a – Includes one point for fastest lap.
- ^b – Sergio Pérez, Carlos Sainz Jr. and Lance Stroll were classified as they completed more than 90% of the race distance.

== Championship standings after the race ==
Drivers' Championship standings

Pos.	Driver	Points
1	(Netherlands) Max Verstappen	313
2	(United Kingdom) Lando Norris	254
3	(Monaco) Charles Leclerc	235
4	(Australia) Oscar Piastri	222
5	(Spain) Carlos Sainz Jr.	184

Constructors' Championship standings

	Pos.	Constructor	Points
1	1	(United Kingdom) McLaren-Mercedes	476
1	2	(Austria) Red Bull Racing-Honda RBPT	456
	3	(Italy) Ferrari	425
	4	(Germany) Mercedes	309
	5	(United Kingdom) Aston Martin Aramco-Mercedes	82

- Note: Only the top five positions are included for both sets of standings.

== See also ==
- 2024 Baku Formula 2 round

Previous race: 2024 Italian Grand Prix	FIA Formula One World Championship; 2024 season	Next race: 2024 Singapore Grand Prix
Previous race: 2023 Azerbaijan Grand Prix	Azerbaijan Grand Prix	Next race: 2025 Azerbaijan Grand Prix
