= Franco Colapinto =

Argentine racing driver (born 2003)

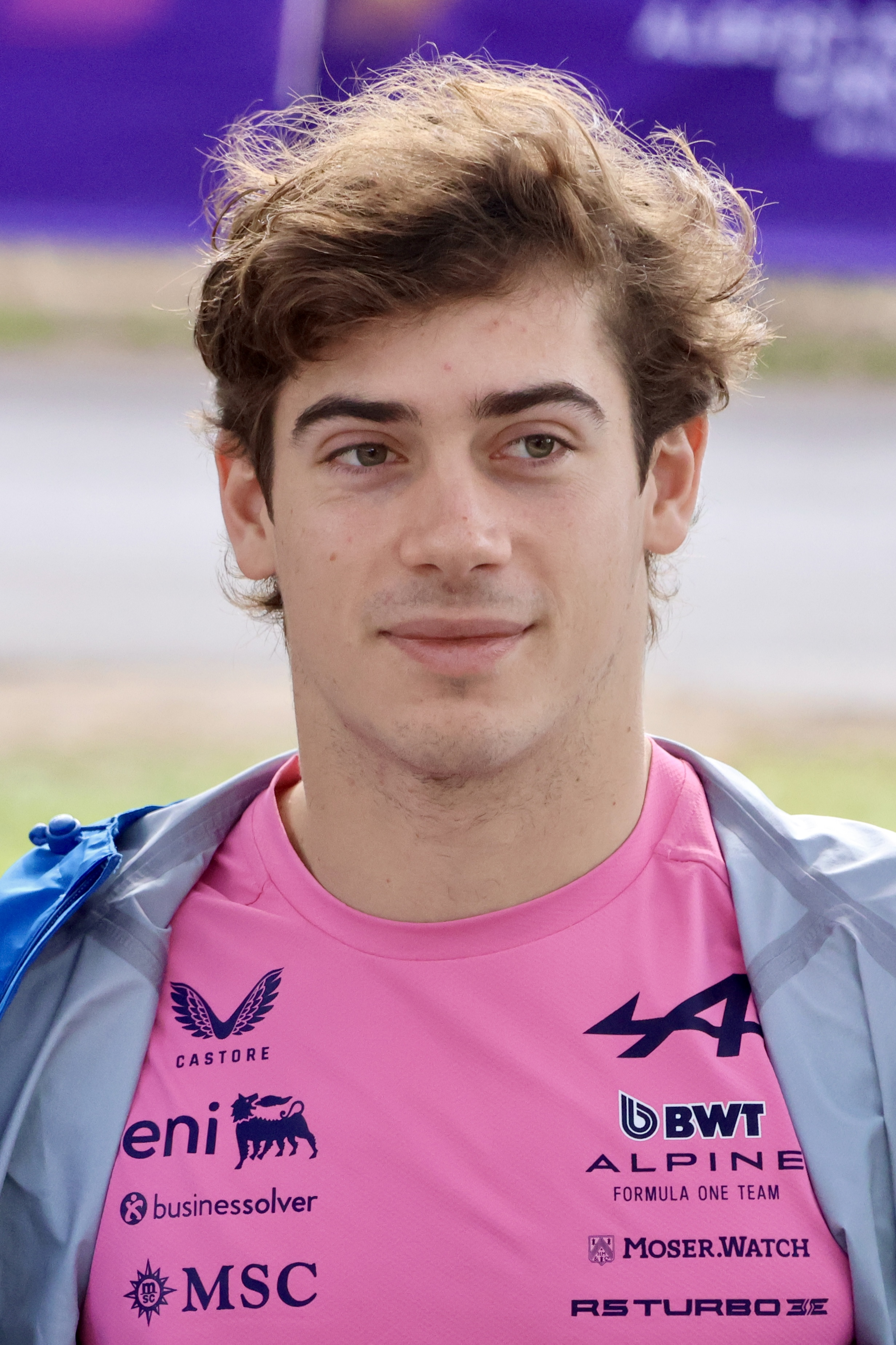
- Colapinto at the 2026 Australian Grand Prix
- Born: Franco Alejandro Colapinto; 27 May 2003 (age 23); Pilar, Buenos Aires, Argentina

Formula One World Championship career
- Nationality: (Argentina) Argentine
- 2026 team: Alpine-Mercedes
- Car number: 43
- Entries: 48 (47 starts)
- Championships: 0
- Wins: 0
- Podiums: 0
- Career points: 40
- Pole positions: 0
- Fastest laps: 0
- First entry: 2024 Italian Grand Prix
- Last entry: 2026 Las Vegas Grand Prix
- 2025 position: 20th (0 pts)

24 Hours of Le Mans career
- Years: 2021
- Teams: G-Drive
- Best finish: 12th (2021)
- Class wins: 0
- Categorisation: FIA Silver (2021); FIA Gold (2022–2024); FIA Platinum (2025–present)

Previous series
- 2024; 2022–2023; 2021; 2021; 2021; 2021; 2021; 2020; 2019–2020; 2018–2019: FIA Formula 2; FIA Formula 3; GTWC Europe; FIA WEC; FR European; ELMS; Asian Le Mans; Toyota Racing Series; Formula Renault Eurocup; F4 Spanish

Championship titles
- 2019: F4 Spanish

Awards
- 2024; 2024: Olimpia de Oro; Overtake Award
- Website: www.francolapinto.com

Signature
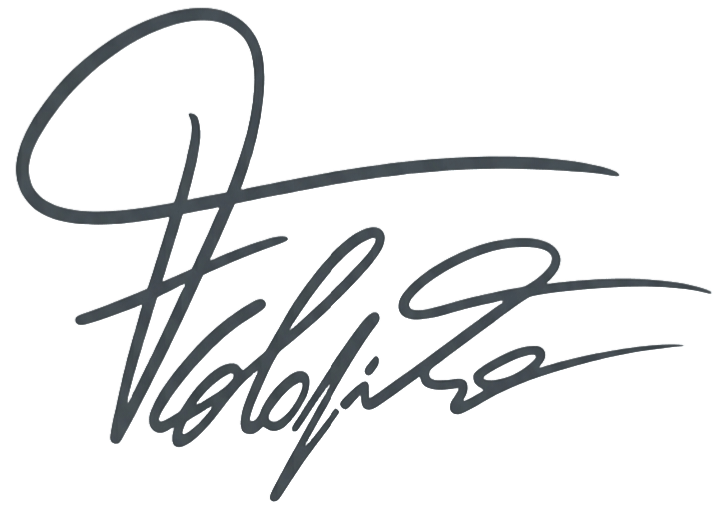

Franco Alejandro Colapinto (Spanish pronunciation: [ˈfɾaŋko kolaˈpinto]; born 27 May 2003) is an Argentine racing driver who competes in Formula One for Alpine.

Born and raised in Pilar, Buenos Aires, Colapinto began competitive kart racing at the age of nine, winning several regional and national championships. Graduating to junior formulae in 2018, Colapinto won his first title at the 2019 F4 Spanish Championship with Drivex. He then finished third in the Formula Renault Eurocup and the Toyota Racing Series in 2020. Colapinto moved into sportscar racing in 2021, competing in the LMP2 class of the FIA World Endurance Championship, European Le Mans Series and Asian Le Mans Series for G-Drive, finishing third at the latter. He also contested Formula Regional European with MP, finishing sixth overall. Colapinto progressed to FIA Formula 3 in 2022, finishing fourth the following season with MP and graduating to FIA Formula 2.

A member of the Williams Driver Academy from 2023 to 2024, Colapinto made his Formula One debut with Williams at the 2024 Italian Grand Prix, replacing Logan Sargeant for the remainder of the 2024 season as an interim for the incoming Carlos Sainz Jr. With his debut, he became the first Argentine driver to compete in Formula One since Gastón Mazzacane in 2001. Colapinto scored his maiden points finish at the Azerbaijan Grand Prix, repeating this feat in the United States. He joined Alpine as a reserve driver for 2025 and was promoted after six Grands Prix to replace Jack Doohan, where he achieved a season-best result of eleventh at the Dutch Grand Prix. Colapinto is contracted to remain at Alpine until at least the end of the 2027 season.

== Early and personal life ==
Franco Alejandro Colapinto was born on 27 May 2003 in Pilar, Buenos Aires, Argentina. Colapinto is of Italian descent through his father and of Ukrainian descent through his mother, Andrea Trofimczuk; he is a dual citizen of Argentina and Italy. Colapinto's father, Aníbal, was part-owner of Turismo Carretera team JC Competición in the 2010s.

Colapinto's favourite drivers are Lewis Hamilton and Ayrton Senna, and his favourite racing circuit is Spa-Francorchamps. He is a supporter of his local football team Boca Juniors.

In addition to his native Spanish, Colapinto is fluent in English, Italian, and semi-fluent in Brazilian Portuguese. He was in a relationship with American-born Argentine actress Maia Reficco for several months until October 2026.

== Junior racing career ==
=== Karting ===
Colapinto started karting at the age of nine. He won the Argentine Championship in 2016 (Pre-Junior class) and 2018 (Sudam class), as well as the Buenos Aires Regional Championship in 2016 (Pre-Junior class) and 2017 (Junior class). Colapinto moved to Italy by himself when he was fourteen years old to pursue his racing career. Colapinto won the karting exhibition race at the 2018 Summer Youth Olympics alongside María García Puig.

=== F4 Spanish Championship ===
==== 2018 ====
Colapinto made his car racing debut in 2018, participating in the final round of the F4 Spanish Championship and driving for Drivex School. His father sold his house to pay for the season. On debut, he finished second in race three and was victorious in the final race.

==== 2019 ====
In 2019, Colapinto signed with FA Racing by Drivex for a full campaign in the F4 Spanish Championship. His father had to sell his house to fund the season. He started his season strongly with two wins in the opening three rounds. This was followed by a hat trick of wins in Valencia and the season finale in Barcelona. With a total of ten poles, eleven wins and thirteen podiums, Colapinto clinched the title, nearly 100 points ahead of his nearest rival.

=== Euroformula Open ===
During the 2019 season, Colapinto raced for Drivex as a guest driver in the 2019 round at Circuit de Spa-Francorchamps. He finished the races in 15th and 14th position.

=== Formula Renault Eurocup ===
==== 2019 ====
Drivex also ran Colapinto during the 2019 season at Spa and Catalunya.

==== 2020 ====
In July 2020, Colapinto joined Formula Renault Eurocup full-time with MP Motorsport. He won his first race on debut during the first race in Monza, and claimed a third place in the second race. In a season dominated by Victor Martins and Caio Collet, Colapinto only returned to the podium during the fifth round in Zandvoort, but was still able to win once again in Spa-Francorchamps. With four further podiums following that, which brought his podium tally nine throughout the season, he placed third in the championship with 213.5 points.

=== Toyota Racing Series ===
In January 2020, Colapinto joined Kiwi Motorsport for the 2020 Toyota Racing Series. The season saw him claim a race win in Hampton Downs, which would be his only one of the campaign. He would later finish on the podium for the remaining two rounds of the season, allowing him to take third in the standings.

=== Formula Regional European Championship ===
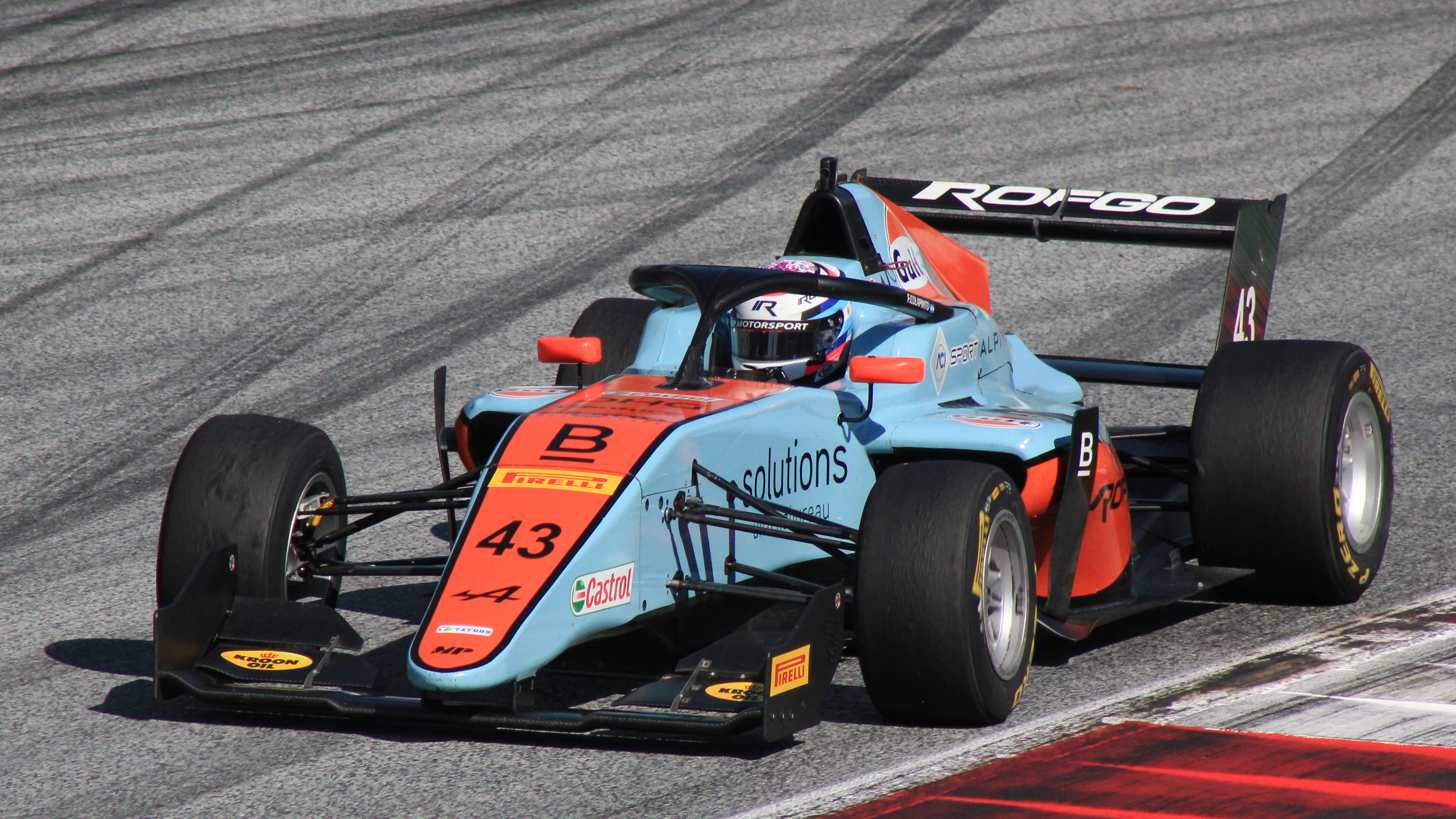
Colapinto during the 2021 Formula Regional European Championship at the Red Bull Ring.

In 2021, Colapinto joined the inaugural Formula Regional European Championship with MP Motorsport. He missed the Imola opener due to clashing sportscar commitments, and had a woeful weekend the next time out in Barcelona. In Monaco, after having his lap times deleted in qualifying due to a technical infraction, Colapinto opted to withdraw from the weekend. He finally took his first podium with second place during the fifth round in Zandvoort, before securing a double victory at the Red Bull Ring. However, the second win would be stripped from him due to track limits. Nevertheless, Colapinto rebounded the following round in Valencia by winning the first race and runner-up in the second. Colapinto eventually finished sixth in the standings despite missing two rounds, lamenting his start to the season as a "lack of pace".

=== FIA Formula 3 Championship ===
==== 2022 ====
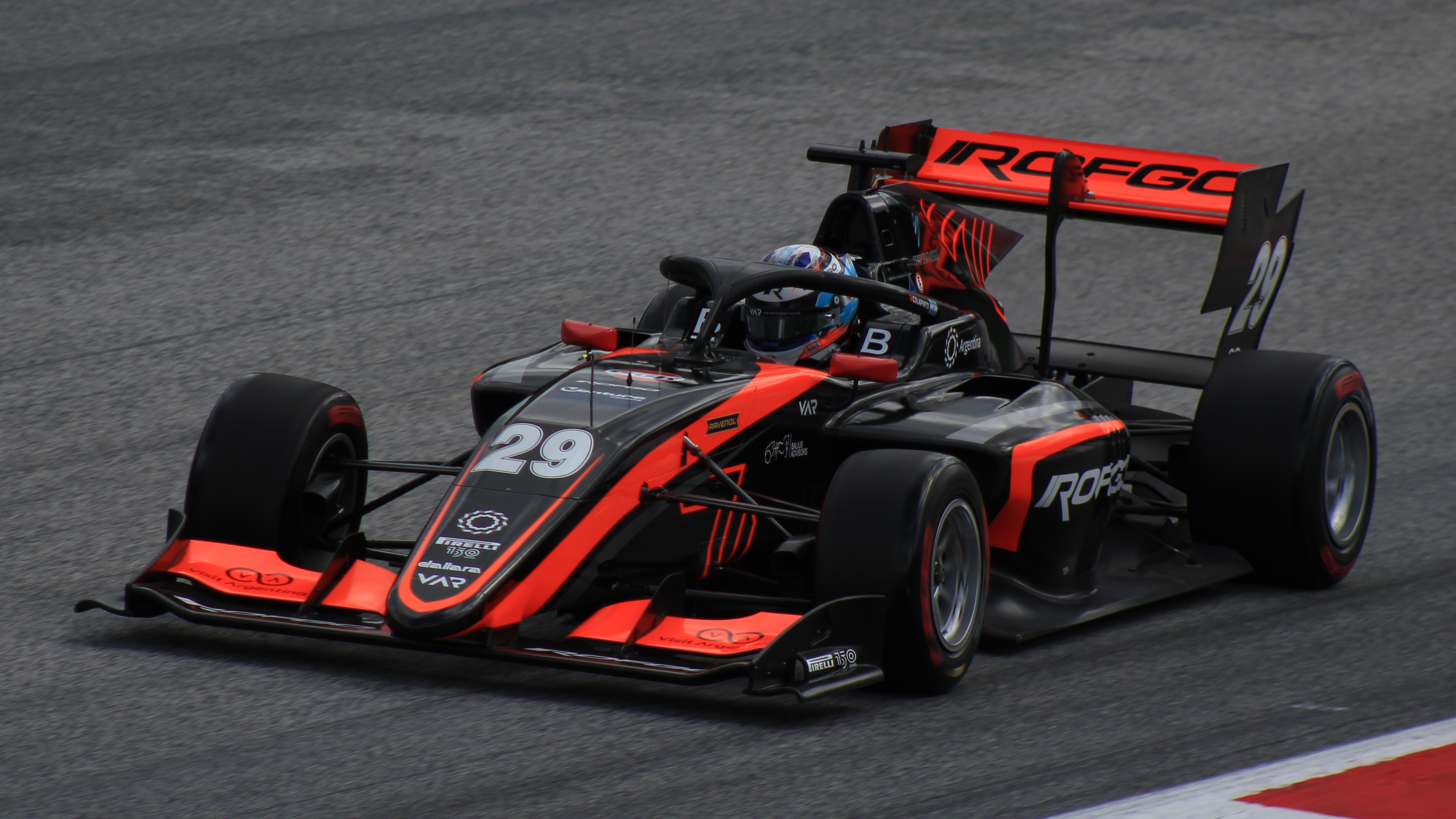
Colapinto driving the Dallara F3 2019 during the 2022 Spielberg Formula 3 round

In October 2020, Colapinto joined MP Motorsport for the first day of post-season testing at Catalunya. He did likewise the following year at Valencia, but ended up signing for Van Amersfoort Racing instead for the 2022 season, partnering Rafael Villagómez and Reece Ushijima. Colapinto started his with a pole position on his and his team's debut in the series in Sakhir. He led the feature race for the first half of the race, but was eventually passed by Victor Martins and Arthur Leclerc, slipping to third. He was then give a time penalty for track limits which dropped Colapinto to fifth. In Imola, he qualified on reverse pole for the sprint race, but lost the lead early on to Caio Collet. Despite that, Colapinto would re-pass him back on the final lap, scoring his and VAR's maiden victory in the series. In the feature race, a wrong tyre choice on a damp track left him to finish down in 22nd place. After finishing ninth in the Barcelona feature race, Colapinto went scoreless during the Silverstone round as he was eliminated on the opening lap from a collision.

In Spielberg, Colapinto returned to the podium with third place in the sprint race, having fended off Leclerc. He would grab points in the feature race with sixth. In the Budapest sprint race Colapinto quickly moved into the lead at the start, but later was unable to defend from Collet, but still managed to finish in second place despite having to manage an electrical issue. A disappointing weekend followed in Spa-Francorchamps where he failed to score, he managed to qualify fifth in Zandvoort. After finishing 13th in the sprint, Colapinto progressed to finish third on Sunday, his first feature race podium. Qualifying again on reverse pole during the final round in Monza, Colapinto led from start to finish for his second win, albeit having to defend hard from Oliver Bearman on the final lap. With two wins and five podiums, Colapinto ended his rookie F3 season ninth in the drivers' standings with 76 points.

==== 2023 ====
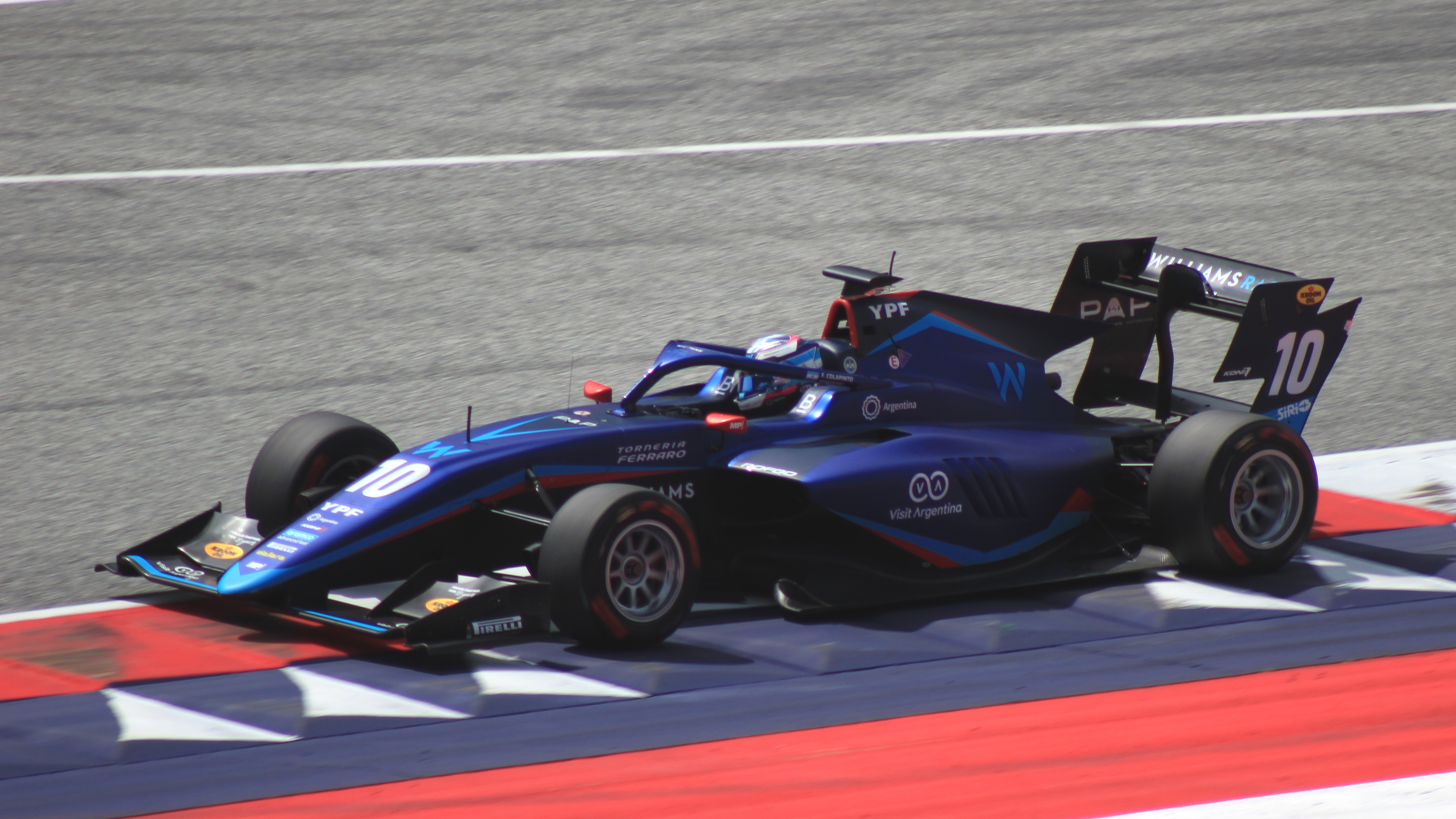
Colapinto driving for MP Motorsport during the 2023 Spielberg Formula 3 round

In September, Colapinto partook in the 2022 post-season test, again with MP Motorsport. On 9 January 2023, he was announced as MP Motorsport's driver for the 2023 season, partnering Jonny Edgar and Mari Boya. At the opening Sakhir round, Colapinto qualified on reverse pole, but lost out to Pepe Martí in the sprint and he ended in second place. He would finish tenth in the feature race. Qualifying seventh in Melbourne, Colapinto slowly climbed up the order, passing Sebastián Montoya on lap 6 to claim his first victory of the season. However, Colapinto was later disqualified. He then crashed out of the feature race after being hit by Luke Browning, ending his miserable weekend. Colapinto had a solid weekend in Monaco, finishing fourth in the sprint and sixth in the feature race.

Colapinto secured third on the grid in Barcelona. He had strong pace in the sprint where he moved up the field to place sixth. In the feature race, he overcame Taylor Barnard early on to secure second place at the chequered flag. Qualifying seventh in Austria, Colapinto battled his way to the podium positions in the feature race, but a last lap contact with Montoya dropped him to fourth place. After qualifying ninth in Silverstone, Colapinto sat in third throughout the sprint race, but inherited the lead after Montoya and Barnard ahead collided. From there, he clinched his first win of the year, dedicating his victory to Dilano van 't Hoff, who was killed in a crash in FRECA. He finished eighth in the feature race. In Budapest, after qualifying fourth and making his way to seventh place in the sprint, Colapinto scored another feature race podium having overtook Leonardo Fornaroli on lap 9 for third.

Colapinto qualified fourth in Spa-Francorchamps, and scored more points in the races with fifth in the sprint, and a wrong tyre strategy meant he finished tenth in the feature race. In the Monza season finale, he qualified on reverse pole and had a fierce battle with teammate Boya in the sprint race, but Colapinto won out and was able to take his second win of the campaign. His feature race ended disappointingly on the opening lap as contact with a driver broke his suspension. Despite that, Colapinto concluded the season fourth in the Drivers' Championship, with two wins, five podiums and 110 points.

==== Macau Grand Prix ====
Colapinto was set to race in the 2023 Macau Grand Prix with MP Motorsport. However, he withdrew from the event last-minute due to a broken collarbone he sustained prior to the final F3 round, and was replaced by Dennis Hauger.

=== FIA Formula 2 Championship ===
==== 2023 ====
In October 2023, MP Motorsport announced that they would promote Colapinto to their Formula 2 outfit for the final race in Yas Marina and the full 2024 season, replacing Jehan Daruvala. Ahead of his F2 debut, Colapinto expressed that "it's going to be tough" yet he was "super excited". He finished 19th in the sprint race, but retired from the feature race due to a sensor issue.

==== 2024 ====
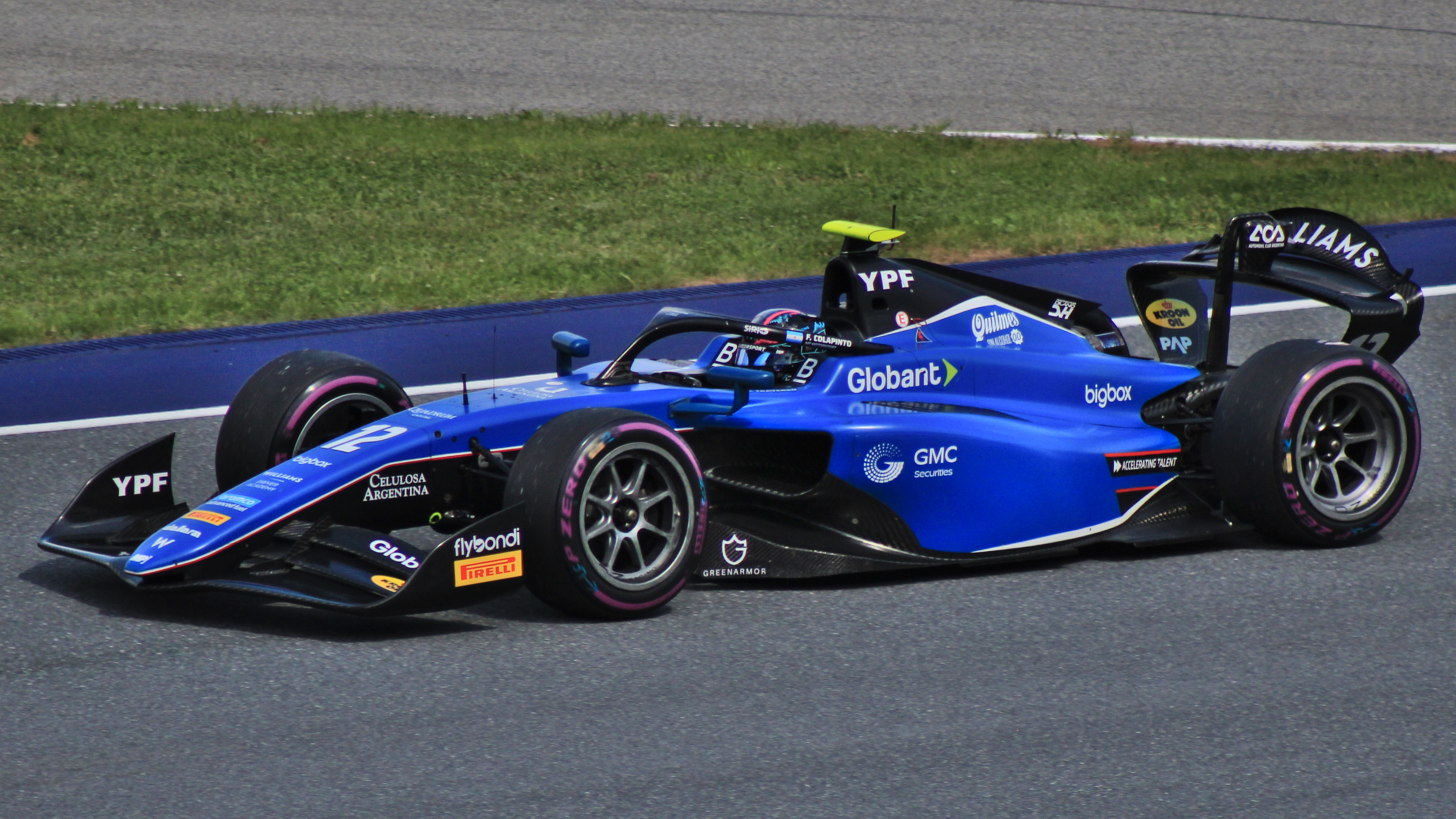
Colapinto driving the Dallara F2 2024 during the 2024 Spielberg Formula 2 round

For 2024 season, Colapinto was partnered at MP Motorsport alongside 2021 FIA Formula 3 champion Dennis Hauger. Qualifying 15th in Bahrain opener, he had a shaky sprint race but was able to move up the order in the feature race, as he scored his first points with sixth place. He would then have a woeful weekend in Jeddah, stalling in the sprint and had a suspension failure after colliding with the wall in the feature race. In Melbourne, Colapinto qualified 13th, but was able to navigate through the chaos in the sprint race and finish fourth. In the feature race, Colapinto fought back up to finish seventh, but was later disqualified due to a technical infringement. In the Imola round, Colapinto qualified in the top-ten, with ninth. A slow start dropped him to third during the sprint, but he quickly overcame Amaury Cordeel and later made a daring last lap pass on Paul Aron for the lead, which allowed Colapinto to claim his first F2 victory. He followed the win with a strong fifth place in the feature race.

Colapinto scored more points in Monaco with fifth place in the sprint race after a strong qualifying, but a late slump in the feature race saw him slip to 13th place. In Barcelona, Colapinto secured third in qualifying. A track limits penalty demoted him to 18th in the sprint race, but a strong showing in the feature race rewarded him with second place. In Austria, he qualified fourth and a heated battle in the sprint with teammate Hauger turned for the worse as Colapinto spun on the final lap, dropping him to 11th. Nonetheless, the next day, an alternate strategy saw Colapinto climb up the field in the late laps to finish second, scoring another podium. Colapinto qualified fourth in Silverstone, and managed the wet weather during the sprint to finish fifth, which included a last-lap pass on Jak Crawford. Running the alternate strategy in the feature race allowed Colapinto to finish fourth. In Hungary, Colapinto picked up more points in a tricky sprint race to finish fifth, but unlucky Safety Car timing in the feature race dropped him from sixth to 13th. Colapinto would fail to score in Spa-Francorchamps as he struggled his way out of the points positions in a sprint race cut short early, while an engine issue ended his feature race on the first lap. At that time, Colapinto sat sixth in the standings with 96 points, 13 ahead of teammate Hauger.

Following the news of his promotion to Formula One with Williams Racing ahead of Monza, Colapinto vacated his seat at MP Motorsport and was replaced by Oliver Goethe.

== Formula One career ==
In January 2023, Colapinto joined the Williams Driver Academy. He completed his first Formula One test at the 2023 post-season test at Yas Marina, driving the Williams FW45. He set the twenty-second fastest time overall, completing 65 laps. Colapinto made his Formula One free practice debut at the 2024 British Grand Prix, driving for Williams in the first session in place of Logan Sargeant. Colapinto stated that it was a "historic moment" representing Argentina at the event.

=== Williams (2024) ===
==== 2024 ====
In the middle of the 2024 season after the Dutch Grand Prix, Colapinto was announced as the replacement for Logan Sargeant at Williams, debuting at the Italian Grand Prix and contracted to compete at the remaining nine rounds of the season alongside Alexander Albon. Colapinto became the first Formula One driver from Argentina since Gastón Mazzacane at the 2001 San Marino Grand Prix. On debut, Colapinto qualified eighteenth and finished twelfth. The following race in Azerbaijan, he qualified ninth and finished eighth, becoming the first Argentine to score points in Formula One since Carlos Reutemann at the 1982 South African Grand Prix. At the Singapore Grand Prix, he finished eleventh and received praise from Red Bull's Sergio Pérez for his defensive driving.

Colapinto finished tenth at the United States Grand Prix, scoring another points finish. In Mexico City, he qualified sixteenth and recovered to twelfth in the race. After the race, the FIA handed Colapinto a 10-second time penalty—which did not affect his position—for a collision with Liam Lawson, as well as two penalty points on his FIA Super License for 12 months. At the São Paulo Grand Prix, Colapinto finished twelfth in the sprint race after starting fourteenth. Colapinto crashed out of the first qualifying session—delayed until Sunday by the FIA due to torrential rain—and qualified eighteenth for the Grand Prix, starting sixteenth after grid penalties for Max Verstappen and Carlos Sainz Jr. In the rain-affected race, Colapinto crashed out on lap 31 under safety car conditions, causing a red flag.

In qualifying for the Las Vegas Grand Prix, Colapinto suffered a 50 g (490 m/s^{2}; 1,600 ft/s^{2}) impact with the barrier after crashing, forcing him to start the race from the pitlane; he finished fourteenth. Due to his several accidents, Colapinto was forced to use outdated car components during the Qatar Grand Prix. After finishing eighteenth in the sprint, he qualified nineteenth for the main race before retiring following a lap one collision with Nico Hülkenberg and Esteban Ocon. Colapinto qualified nineteenth for the season-ending Abu Dhabi Grand Prix, ahead of debutant Jack Doohan, and started last following a gearbox penalty. He suffered a rear puncture on the third lap after a collision with Oscar Piastri, and ultimately retired on lap 26 with a cooling issue. He finished the season nineteenth in the standings, having achieved five championship points across nine Grands Prix—three behind teammate Albon.

=== Alpine (2025–present) ===
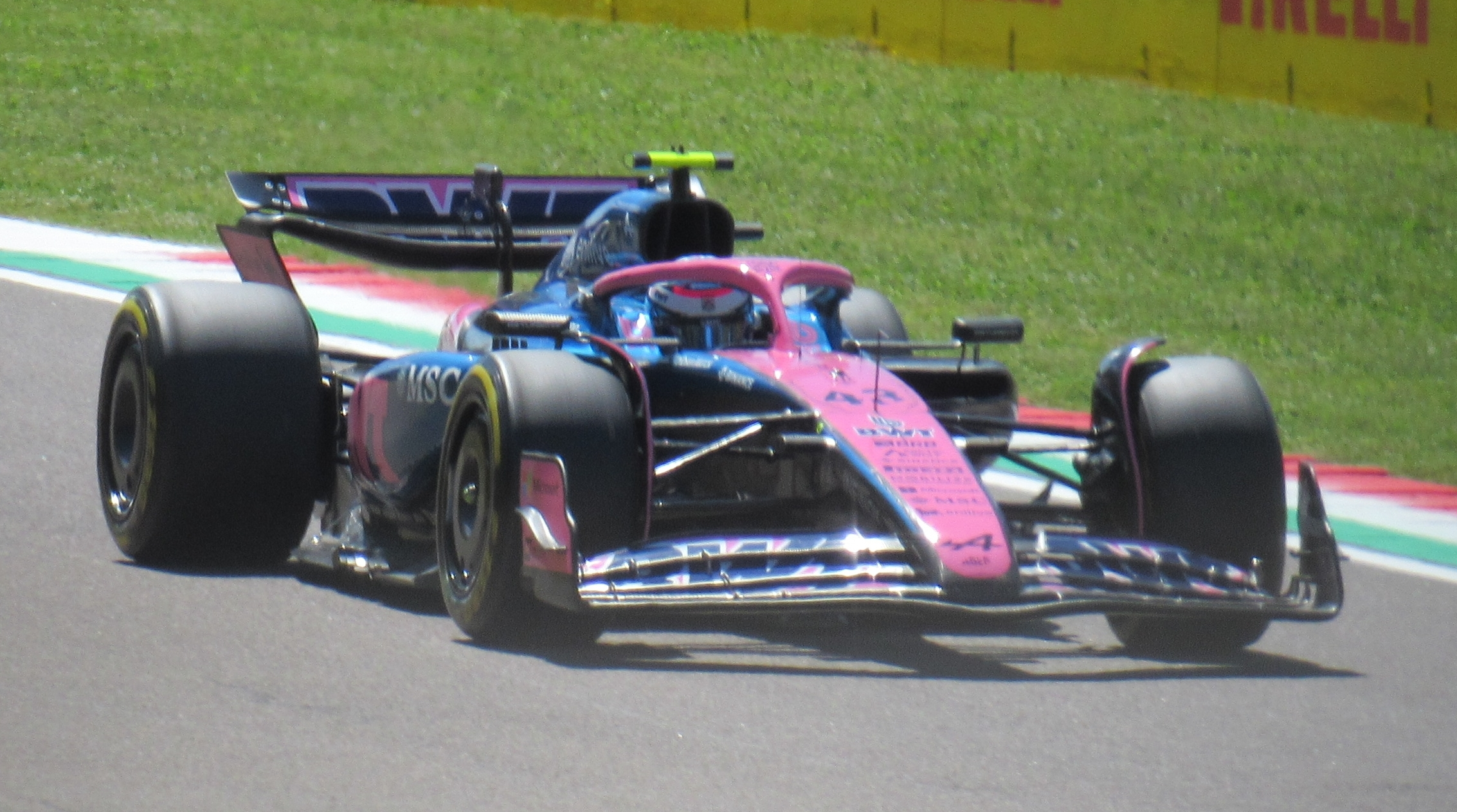
Colapinto on his debut with the Alpine team at the 2025 Emilia Romagna Grand Prix

==== 2025 ====
In 2025, Colapinto joined Alpine as a test and reserve driver on a multi-year deal. Amidst rumours he could replace full-time driver Jack Doohan during the season, team supervisor Flavio Briatore guaranteed that Alpine would start the season with Doohan, adding that "after that, we'll see".

Following the Miami Grand Prix, Doohan, who was demoted to reserve driver, was confirmed to have lost his Alpine seat to Colapinto on a "rotating seat" basis, with the latter scheduled to debut at the subsequent Emilia Romagna Grand Prix and race for Alpine for five races. After crashing in qualifying and taking a one-place grid penalty, he started and finished the race in sixteenth. In Monaco, he qualified last and finished the race thirteenth. In Spain, he qualified nineteenth and finished the race fifteenth. In Canada, he qualified twelfth, for the first time ahead of his teammate Pierre Gasly. He finished the race thirteenth. Before the Austrian Grand Prix, which was to be his final race under contract, it was confirmed that Colapinto would retain his seat with the team, effectively on a race-by-race basis. Colapinto's best finish in 2025 was in the Dutch Grand Prix, finishing eleventh.

==== 2026 ====
Colapinto is continuing alongside Pierre Gasly at Alpine in 2026. He opened the season at the Australian Grand Prix, where he made a split-second evasive manoeuvre at the start, swerving to avoid a stalled Liam Lawson and squeezing through the gap to the pit wall. Mercedes driver George Russell later described the move on social media as the "save of the season". He was subsequently given a ten-second stop-and-go penalty for a start procedure infringement and finished 14th.

At the Chinese Grand Prix, Colapinto scored a point for Alpine, qualifying twelfth and finishing tenth. This marked his first point since his previous stint with Williams. During the race, he ran as high as second place. At the Canadian Grand Prix, Colapinto finished the race sixth, a career best. He scored points again with a tenth-place finish at Barcelona-Catalunya, a ninth-place finish at Silverstone, and a tenth-place finish in Belgium. Following a fifteenth-place finish in Hungary, and a fourteenth place finish in the Netherlands, he scored points again at the Italian Grand Prix where he placed ninth, and the Spanish Grand Prix where he finished seventh. In Baku, Colapinto qualified tenth, but did not finish the race due to a crash on the thirty-sixth lap involving teammate Gasly and McLaren driver Lando Norris. This was followed by a thirteenth-place finish at the Bahrain Grand Prix, a retirement in Singapore due to technical issues, and another retirement at the United States Grand Prix following contact with Arvid Lindblad. In Mexico, he finished eighth, but received a ten-second post-race time penalty for ignoring yellow flags, leading to an eventual fifteenth-place classification. In Las Vegas, he finished sixth giving him his first point finish since the Spanish Grand Prix.

==== 2027 ====
In August 2026, Colapinto was announced to remain with Alpine alongside Gasly in 2027.

== Other racing ==
=== Sportscar racing career ===
In the 2021 pre-season, Colapinto took part in the Asian Le Mans Series for G-Drive Racing. Although he did not win, Colapinto and his teammates Rui Andrade and John Falb achieved three podiums throughout the season, which placed them third in the LMP2 standings.

Later in the season, Colapinto continued with G-Drive Racing to race in the European Le Mans Series partnering with Nyck de Vries and Roman Rusinov as well as for his maiden 24 Hours of Le Mans. He took his first endurance racing victory during the 4 Hours of Le Castellet, having secured his first ELMS podium prior to that at the Red Bull Ring. Colapinto then took his first pole position in Monza but a strategic error saw them plummet down the order, before recovering to eighth. He eventually finished fourth overall in the standings. In Le Mans, Colapinto was able to pull through and secure seventh in the LMP2 category.

Colapinto would also take part in the 24 Hours of Spa with Team WRT in a last-minute stand in for Stuart Hall. The team finished in 14th place.

Colapinto received his FIA Silver Categorisation in 2021, before being upgraded to FIA Gold in 2022 and FIA Platinum in 2025.

== Karting record ==
=== Karting career summary ===
Season	Series	Team	Position
2013	Rotax Max Buenos Aires — Micro Max	MZ	2nd
2014	Argentine Championship — Promocional	FA by Zaffaroni	6th
2014	Buenos Aires Regional Championship - Promocional	FA by Zaffaroni	5th
2015	Argentine Championship — Pre-Junior	Acosta Racing Team	**2nd**
2015	Buenos Aires Regional Championship - Pre-Junior	Acosta Racing Team	2nd
2016	Argentine Championship — Sudam Junior		10th
2016	Argentine Championship — Pre-Junior	Acosta Racing Team	**1st**
2016	Buenos Aires Regional Championship — Pre-Junior	Acosta Racing Team	**1st**
2016	SKUSA SuperNationals — X30 Junior		12th
2016	ROK Cup International Final — Junior ROK	BabyRace	9th
2016	CIK-FIA European Championship — OK-J	BabyRace	No Clas.
2017	Argentine Championship - Junior	Acosta Racing Team	
2017	Buenos Aires Regional Championship — Junior	Acosta Racing Team	**1st**
2017	South Garda Winter Cup — OK-J		**2nd**
2017	SKUSA SuperNationals — X30 Junior	CRG Nordam	23rd
2017	CIK-FIA World Championship — OK-J	BabyRace	35th
2018	Argentine Championship — X30 Codasur	Acosta Racing Team	**1st**
2018	WSK Champions Cup — OK	CRG	22nd
2018	South Garda Winter Cup — OK	CRG	17th
2018	Andrea Margutti Trophy — OK	CRG	24th
2018	WSK Super Master Series — OK	CRG	46th
2018	CIK-FIA European Championship — OK	CRG	69th
2018	WSK Open Cup — OK	CRG	32nd
2018	CIK-FIA World Championship — OK	CRG	45th
2018	Summer Youth Olympics	Argentina	**1st**

=== Complete CIK-FIA Karting European Championship results ===
(key) (Races in bold indicate pole position) (Races in italics indicate fastest lap)

Year	Team	Class	1	2	3	4	5	6	7	8	9	10	11	12	DC	Points
2016	BabyRace	OK-J	ZUE; QH; 65	ZUE; PF; 24	ZUE; R DNQ	ADR; QH	ADR; PF	ADR; R	PRT; QH	PRT; PF	PRT; R	GEN; QH	GEN; PF	GEN; R	NC	0
2018	CRG	OK	SAR; QH; 70	SAR; R DNQ	PFI; QH; 51	PFI; R DNQ	AMP; QH	AMP; R	ALB; QH	ALB; R					69th	0

== Racing record ==
=== Racing career summary ===
Season	Series	Team	Races	Wins	Poles	F/Laps	Podiums	Points	Position
2018	F4 Spanish Championship	Drivex School	4	1	2	0	2	49	9th
2019	F4 Spanish Championship	Drivex School	21	11	10	10	13	325	**1st**
2019	Euroformula Open Championship	Drivex School	2	0	0	0	0	0	27th
2019	Formula Renault Eurocup	FA Racing by Drivex	4	0	0	0	0	—N/a	NC†
2020	Formula Renault Eurocup	MP Motorsport	20	2	0	2	9	213.5	**3rd**
2020	Toyota Racing Series	Kiwi Motorsport	15	1	1	2	8	315	**3rd**
2021	Formula Regional European Championship	MP Motorsport	16	2	3	4	4	140	6th
2021	Asian Le Mans Series – LMP2	G-Drive Racing	4	0	3	3	3	66	**3rd**
2021	European Le Mans Series – LMP2	G-Drive Racing	6	1	1	1	2	74	4th
2021	FIA World Endurance Championship – LMP2	G-Drive Racing	2	0	0	0	0	—N/a	NC†
2021	24 Hours of Le Mans – LMP2	G-Drive Racing	1	0	0	0	0	—N/a	7th
2021	GT World Challenge Europe Endurance Cup – Silver	ROFGO Racing with Team WRT	1	0	0	0	0	11	27th
2021	Intercontinental GT Challenge	Team WRT	1	0	0	0	0	0	NC
2022	FIA Formula 3 Championship	Van Amersfoort Racing	18	2	1	0	5	76	9th
2023	FIA Formula 3 Championship	MP Motorsport	18	2	0	0	5	110	4th
2023	FIA Formula 2 Championship	MP Motorsport	2	0	0	0	0	0	25th
2024	FIA Formula 2 Championship	MP Motorsport	20	1	0	3	3	96	9th
2024	Formula One	Williams Racing	9	0	0	0	0	5	19th
2025	Formula One	BWT Alpine F1 Team	18	0	0	0	0	0	20th
2026	Formula One	BWT Alpine Formula One Team	21	0	0	0	0	35*	12th*

^{†} As Colapinto was a guest driver, he was ineligible for championship points.
* Season still in progress.

=== Complete F4 Spanish Championship results ===
(key) (Races in bold indicate pole position) (Races in italics indicate fastest lap)

Year	Team	1	2	3	4	5	6	7	8	9	10	11	12	13	14	15	16	17	18	19	20	21	DC	Points
2018	Drivex School	ARA; 1	ARA; 2	ARA; 3	CRT; 1	CRT; 2	CRT; 3	ALG; 1	ALG; 2	ALG; 3	CAT; 1	CAT; 2	JER; 1	JER; 2	JER; 3	NAV; 1; 5	NAV; 2; 5	NAV; 3; 2	NAV; 4; 1				9th	49
2019	Drivex School	**NAV**; **1**; 1	**NAV**; **2**; 3	**NAV**; **3**; 6	LEC; 1; 4	LEC; 2; 7	LEC; 3; 4	ARA; 1; 1	ARA; 2; 14	ARA; 3; 11	**CRT**; **1**; 1	CRT; 2; 1	CRT; 3; 1	JER; 1; 4	JER; 2; 3	**JER**; **3**; 1	**ALG**; **1**; 1	**ALG**; **2**; 1	**ALG**; **3**; 4	**CAT**; **1**; 1	**CAT**; **2**; 1	CAT; 3; 1	1st	325

=== Complete Euroformula Open Championship results ===
(key) (Races in bold indicate pole position) (Races in italics indicate fastest lap)

Year	Team	1	2	3	4	5	6	7	8	9	10	11	12	13	14	15	16	17	18	Pos	Points
2019	Drivex School	LEC; 1	LEC; 2	PAU; 1	PAU; 2	HOC; 1	HOC; 2	SPA; 1; 15	SPA; 2; 14	HUN; 1	HUN; 2	RBR; 1	RBR; 2	SIL; 1	SIL; 2	CAT; 1	CAT; 2	MNZ; 1	MNZ; 2	27th	0

=== Complete Formula Renault Eurocup results ===
(key) (Races in bold indicate pole position) (Races in italics indicate fastest lap)

Year	Team	1	2	3	4	5	6	7	8	9	10	11	12	13	14	15	16	17	18	19	20	DC	Points
2019	FA Racing by Drivex	MNZ; 1	MNZ; 2	SIL; 1	SIL; 2	MON; 1	MON; 2	LEC; 1	LEC; 2	SPA; 1; 12	SPA; 2; 20	NÜR; 1	NÜR; 2	HUN; 1	HUN; 2	CAT; 1; 11	CAT; 2; 10	HOC; 1	HOC; 2	YMC; 1	YMC; 2	NC†	0
2020	MP Motorsport	MNZ; 1; 1	MNZ; 2; 3	IMO; 1; 6	IMO; 2; 7	NÜR; 1; 7	NÜR; 2; 6	MAG; 1; 13	MAG; 2 Ret	ZAN; 1; 6	ZAN; 2; 3	CAT; 1; 6	CAT; 2; 3	SPA; 1; 1‡	SPA; 2; 12	IMO; 1; 4	IMO; 2; 2	HOC; 1; 4	HOC; 2; 3	LEC; 1; 3	LEC; 2; 3	3rd	213.5

^{†} As Colapinto was a guest driver, he was ineligible for points.
^{‡} Half points awarded as less than 75% of race distance was completed.

=== Complete Toyota Racing Series results ===
(key) (Races in bold indicate pole position) (Races in italics indicate fastest lap)

Year	Team	1	2	3	4	5	6	7	8	9	10	11	12	13	14	15	DC	Points
2020	Kiwi Motorsport	HIG; 1; 9	HIG; 2; 6	HIG; 3; 2	TER; 1; 4	TER; 2; 5	TER; 3; 8	HMP; 1; 5	HMP; 2; 1	HMP; 3; 8	PUK; 1; 3	PUK; 2; 3	PUK; 3; 2	**MAN**; **1**; 3	MAN; 2; 2	MAN; 3; 2	3rd	315

=== Complete Asian Le Mans Series results ===
(key) (Races in bold indicate pole position) (Races in italics indicate fastest lap)

Year	Team	Class	Chassis	Engine	1	2	3	4	Pos.	Points
2021	G-Drive Racing	LMP2	Aurus 01	Gibson GK428 4.2 L V8	**DUB**; **1**; 4	**DUB**; **2**; 2	**ABU**; **1**; 3	ABU; 2; 2	3rd	66

=== Complete Formula Regional European Championship results ===
(key) (Races in bold indicate pole position) (Races in italics indicate fastest lap)

Year	Team	1	2	3	4	5	6	7	8	9	10	11	12	13	14	15	16	17	18	19	20	DC	Points
2021	MP Motorsport	IMO; 1 WD	IMO; 2 WD	CAT; 1; 28†	CAT; 2 Ret	MCO; 1 WD	MCO; 2 WD	LEC; 1; 12	LEC; 2; 12	ZAN; 1; 5	ZAN; 2; 2	SPA; 1 Ret	SPA; 2; 6	**RBR**; **1**; 1	**RBR**; **2**; 4	**VAL**; **1**; 1	VAL; 2; 2	MUG; 1 Ret	MUG; 2; 5	MNZ; 1; 7	MNZ; 2; 6	6th	140

^{†} Driver did not finish the race, but was classified as they completed more than 90% of the race distance.

=== Complete European Le Mans Series results ===
Year	Entrant	Class	Chassis	Engine	1	2	3	4	5	6	Rank	Points
2021	G-Drive Racing	LMP2	Aurus 01	Gibson GK428 4.2 L V8	CAT; 4	RBR; 2	LEC; 1	**MNZ**; 8	SPA; NC	ALG; 5	4th	74

=== Complete 24 Hours of Le Mans results ===
Year	Team	Co-Drivers	Car	Class	Laps	Pos.	Class Pos.
2021	G-Drive Racing	Roman Rusinov (Netherlands) Nyck de Vries	Aurus 01-Gibson	LMP2	358	12th	7th

=== Complete Intercontinental GT Challenge results ===
Year	Team	Car	1	2	3	Pos.	Points
2021	Team WRT	R8 LMS Evo	SPA; 14	IND	KYA	NC	0

=== Complete FIA Formula 3 Championship results ===
(key) (Races in bold indicate pole position; races in italics indicate points for the fastest lap of top ten finishers)

Year	Entrant	1	2	3	4	5	6	7	8	9	10	11	12	13	14	15	16	17	18	DC	Points
2022	Van Amersfoort Racing	BHR; SPR; 25	**BHR**; **FEA**; 5	IMO; SPR; 1	IMO; FEA; 22	CAT; SPR; Ret	CAT; FEA; 8	SIL; SPR; 13	SIL; FEA; Ret	RBR; SPR; 3	RBR; FEA; 6	HUN; SPR; 2	HUN; FEA; 15	SPA; SPR; 15	SPA; FEA; 12	ZAN; SPR; 13	ZAN; FEA; 3	MNZ; SPR; 1	MNZ; FEA; 15	9th	76
2023	MP Motorsport	BHR; SPR; 2	BHR; FEA; 10	MEL; SPR; DSQ	MEL; FEA; Ret	MON; SPR; 4	MON; FEA; 6	CAT; SPR; 6	CAT; FEA; 2	RBR; SPR; 13	RBR; FEA; 4	SIL; SPR; 1	SIL; FEA; 8	HUN; SPR; 7	HUN; FEA; 3	SPA; SPR; 5	SPA; FEA; 10	MNZ; SPR; 1	MNZ; FEA; Ret	4th	110

=== Complete FIA Formula 2 Championship results ===
(key) (Races in bold indicate pole position) (Races in italics indicate points for the fastest lap of top ten finishers)

Year	Entrant	1	2	3	4	5	6	7	8	9	10	11	12	13	14	15	16	17	18	19	20	21	22	23	24	25	26	27	28	DC	Points
2023	MP Motorsport	BHR; SPR	BHR; FEA	JED; SPR	JED; FEA	MEL; SPR	MEL; FEA	BAK; SPR	BAK; FEA	MCO; SPR	MCO; FEA	CAT; SPR	CAT; FEA	RBR; SPR	RBR; FEA	SIL; SPR	SIL; FEA	HUN; SPR	HUN; FEA	SPA; SPR	SPA; FEA	ZAN; SPR	ZAN; FEA	MNZ; SPR	MNZ; FEA	YMC; SPR; 19	YMC; FEA; Ret			25th	0
2024	MP Motorsport	BHR; SPR; 18	BHR; FEA; 6	JED; SPR; 11	JED; FEA; Ret	MEL; SPR; 4	MEL; FEA; DSQ	IMO; SPR; 1	IMO; FEA; 5	MON; SPR; 5	MON; FEA; 13	CAT; SPR; 18	CAT; FEA; 2	RBR; SPR; 11	RBR; FEA; 2	SIL; SPR; 5	SIL; FEA; 4	HUN; SPR; 5	HUN; FEA; 13	SPA; SPR; 8	SPA; FEA; Ret	MNZ; SPR	MNZ; FEA	BAK; SPR	BAK; FEA	LSL; SPR	LSL; FEA	YMC; SPR	YMC; FEA	9th	96

=== Complete Formula One results ===
(key) (Races in bold indicate pole position; races in italics indicate fastest lap; ^{superscript} indicates point-scoring sprint position)

Year	Entrant	Chassis	Engine	1	2	3	4	5	6	7	8	9	10	11	12	13	14	15	16	17	18	19	20	21	22	23	24	WDC	Points
2024	Williams Racing	Williams FW46	Mercedes-AMG M15 E Performance 1.6 V6 t	BHR	SAU	AUS	JPN	CHN	MIA	EMI	MON	CAN	ESP	AUT	GBR; TD	HUN	BEL	NED	ITA; 12	AZE; 8	SIN; 11	USA; 10	MXC; 12	SAP; Ret	LVG; 14	QAT; Ret	ABU; Ret	19th	5
2025	BWT Alpine F1 Team	Alpine A525	Renault E-Tech R.E.25 1.6 V6 t	AUS	CHN	JPN	BHR	SAU	MIA	EMI; 16	MON; 13	ESP; 15	CAN; 13	AUT; 15	GBR; DNS	BEL; 19	HUN; 18	NED; 11	ITA; 17	AZE; 19	SIN; 16	USA; 17	MXC; 16	SAP; 15	LVG; 15	QAT; 14	ABU; 20	20th	0
2026	BWT Alpine F1 Team	Alpine A526	Mercedes-AMG M17 E Performance 1.6 V6 t	AUS; 14	CHN; 10	JPN; 16	MIA; 7	CAN; 6	MON; 14	BCN; 10	AUT; 15	GBR; 9	BEL; 10	HUN; 15	NED; 14	ITA; 9	ESP; 7	AZE; Ret	BHR; 13	SIN; Ret	USA; Ret	MXC; 15	SAP; 13	LVG; 6	QAT	ABU		12th*	35*

^{†} Did not finish, but was classified as he had completed more than 90% of the race distance.
* Season still in progress.

Sporting positions
Preceded by Amaury Cordeel	F4 Spanish Championship; Champion; 2019	Succeeded by Kas Haverkort
