= Karting at the 2018 Summer Youth Olympics =

Sporting event

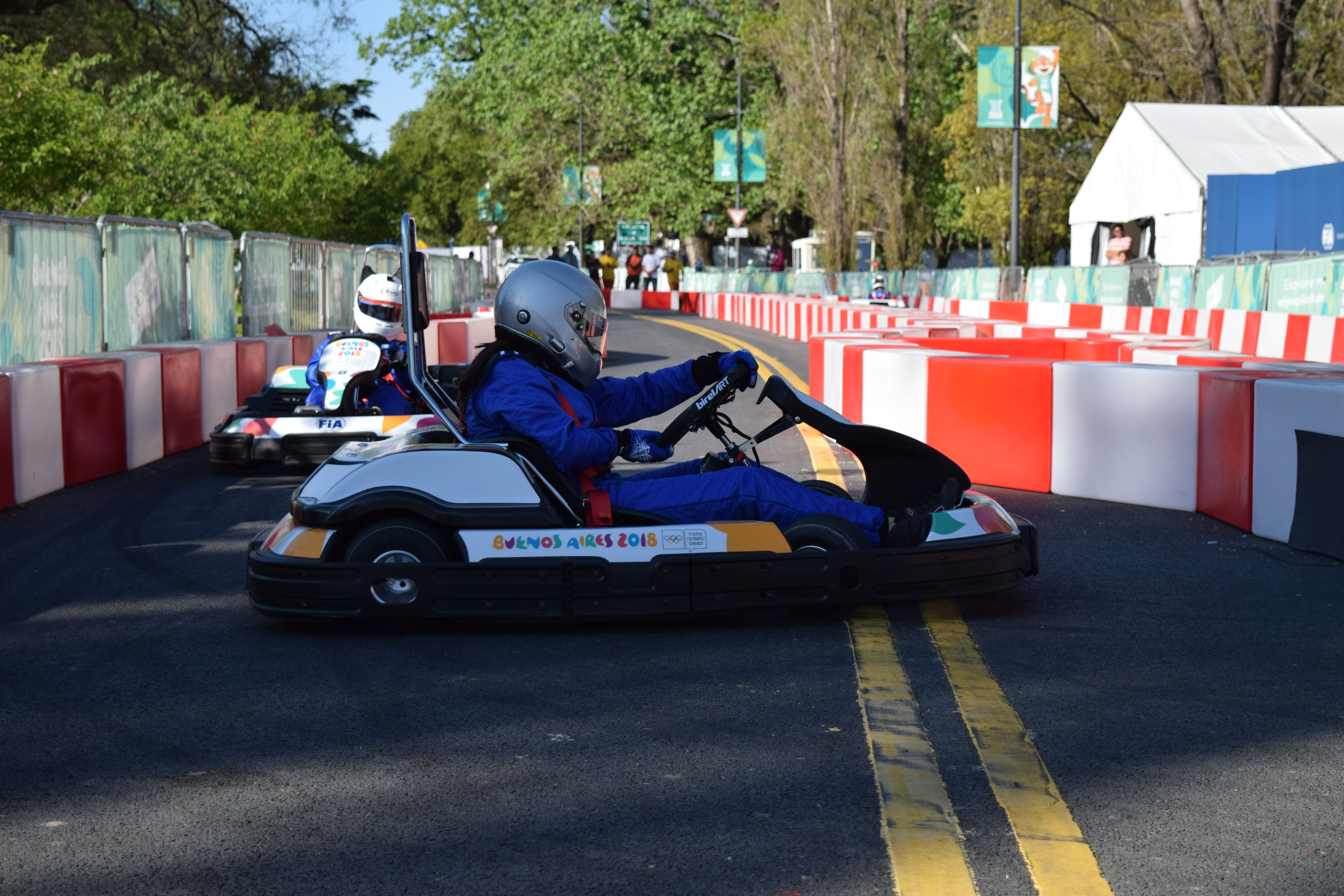
Karting exhibition at the Green Park before the start of the Games.

Karting at the 2018 Summer Youth Olympics was held on 13 October. The events took place at the Kartodromo in the Autodromo Juan y Oscar Galvez in Buenos Aires, Argentina. The exhibition event was part of the Youth Olympics with the intention to add the sport in the 2024 Summer Olympics in Paris. All electric karting were driven by pairs with mixed genders.

Six pairs, with a boy and a girl each, participated in the event with practice and qualifying sessions scheduled ahead of the race. The pair of Franco Colapinto and María García Puig won the race from pole position.

== Event ==
The karting event was presented at the Green Park, by the president of FIA Jean Todt, the president of the IOC Thomas Bach, on October 4, the president of Argentine Olympic Committee Gerardo Werthein, and 2018 Youth Olympic Games CEO Leandro Larrosa, hosted by Argentine bilingual motorsport and football commentator Francisco Aure. The event was presented within the program 3500LIVES of the FIA.

== Results ==
Position	Drivers
1	(Argentina) Franco Colapinto (Argentina) María García Puig
2	(Chile) Nico Pino (Argentina) Camila Almada
3	(Argentina) Kevin Pilo (Argentina) Maria Dolores Inghiotti
4	(Argentina) Guido Moggia (Argentina) Valentina Funes
5	(Argentina) Lucas Longhi (Argentina) Ana Laura Arlan
6	(Brazil) Guilherme de Figuereido (Argentina) María José Lambertucci
