= 2024 Italian Grand Prix =

Formula One motor race

Race 16 of 24 in the 2024 Formula One World Championship
| ← Previous race | Next race → |
- Layout of the Autodromo Nazionale di Monza

Race details
- Date: 1 September 2024
- Official name: Formula 1 Pirelli Gran Premio d'Italia 2024
- Location: Monza Circuit; Monza, Italy
- Course: Permanent racing facility
- Course length: 5.793 km (3.600 miles)
- Distance: 53 laps, 306.720 km (190.587 miles)
- Weather: Partly cloudy
- Attendance: 335,000

Pole position
| Driver | (United Kingdom) Lando Norris | McLaren-Mercedes |
- Time: 1:19.327

Fastest lap
| Driver | (United Kingdom) Lando Norris | McLaren-Mercedes |
- Time: 1:21.432 on lap 53

Podium
| First | (Monaco) Charles Leclerc | Ferrari |
| Second | (Australia) Oscar Piastri | McLaren-Mercedes |
| Third | (United Kingdom) Lando Norris | McLaren-Mercedes |

The 2024 Italian Grand Prix (officially known as the Formula 1 Pirelli Gran Premio d'Italia 2024) was a Formula One motor race held on 1 September 2024 at the Monza Circuit in Monza, Italy. It was the sixteenth round of the 2024 Formula One World Championship.

The race featured the Grand Prix debut of Franco Colapinto, who drove for Williams until the end of the season. Lando Norris and Oscar Piastri locked out the front row for McLaren, their first at Monza since 2012. The 53-lap race was won by Charles Leclerc of Ferrari, who utilised a one-stop strategy to take the team’s first win at Monza since 2019. Piastri and Norris rounded out the podium, the latter scoring the fastest lap.

Despite not winning the race, Norris outscored Max Verstappen by eight points in order to close the gap in the World Drivers' Championship to 62 points. Leclerc moved to 217 points, being 86 points behind Verstappen in third. McLaren capitalised on Red Bull's performance, as both teams were only separated by eight points at the lead of the Constructors' Championship, with Red Bull and McLaren moving 446 and 438 points, respectively. Ferrari remained in third, just 39 points behind Red Bull, meaning that the Constructors' Championship were contested by three teams heading into the final stages of the season.

== Background ==
The event was held at the Monza Circuit in Monza for the 74th time in the circuit's history, across the weekend of 30 August – 1 September. The Grand Prix was the sixteenth round of the 2024 Formula One World Championship and the 75th running of the Italian Grand Prix as a round of the Formula One World Championship. On 29 August, the safety car crashed off the track at turn 11. Driver Bernd Mayländer and passenger Richard Darker were not injured in the incident.

=== Championship standings before the race ===
Going into the weekend, Max Verstappen led the Drivers' Championship with 295 points, 70 points ahead of Lando Norris in second, and 103 ahead of Charles Leclerc in third. Red Bull Racing, with 434 points, led the Constructors' Championship from McLaren and Ferrari, who are second and third with 404 and 370 points, respectively.

=== Entrants ===
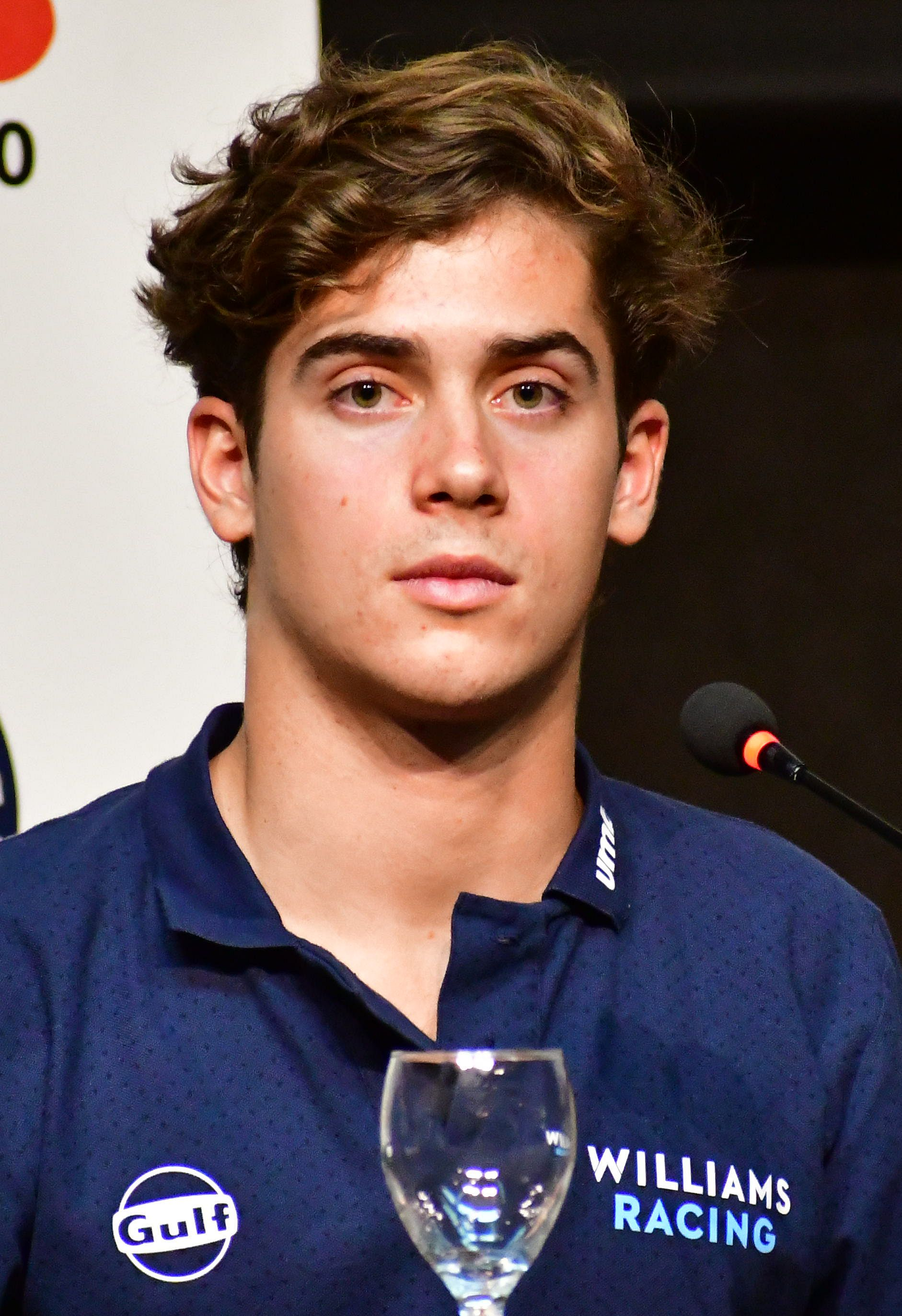
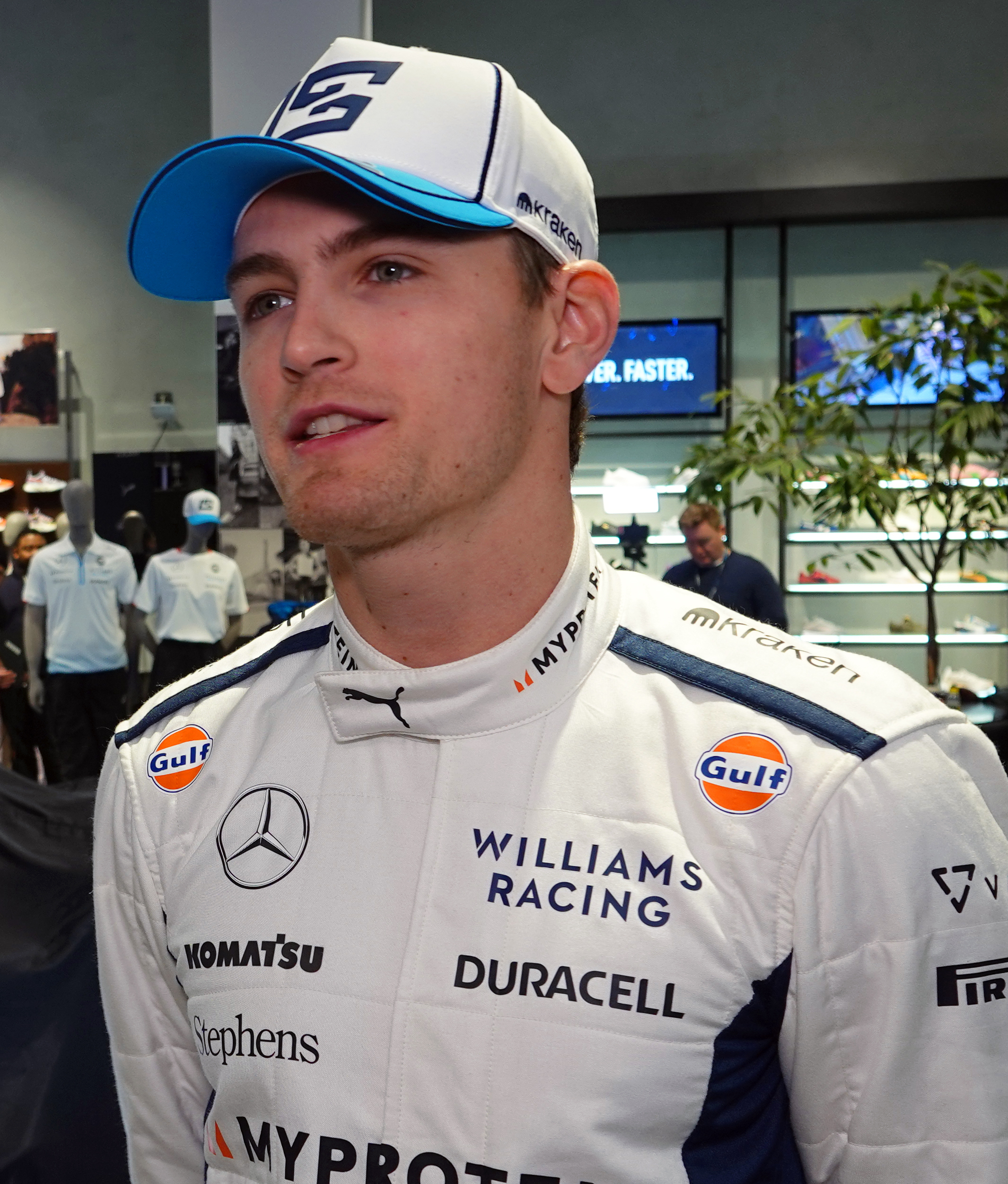
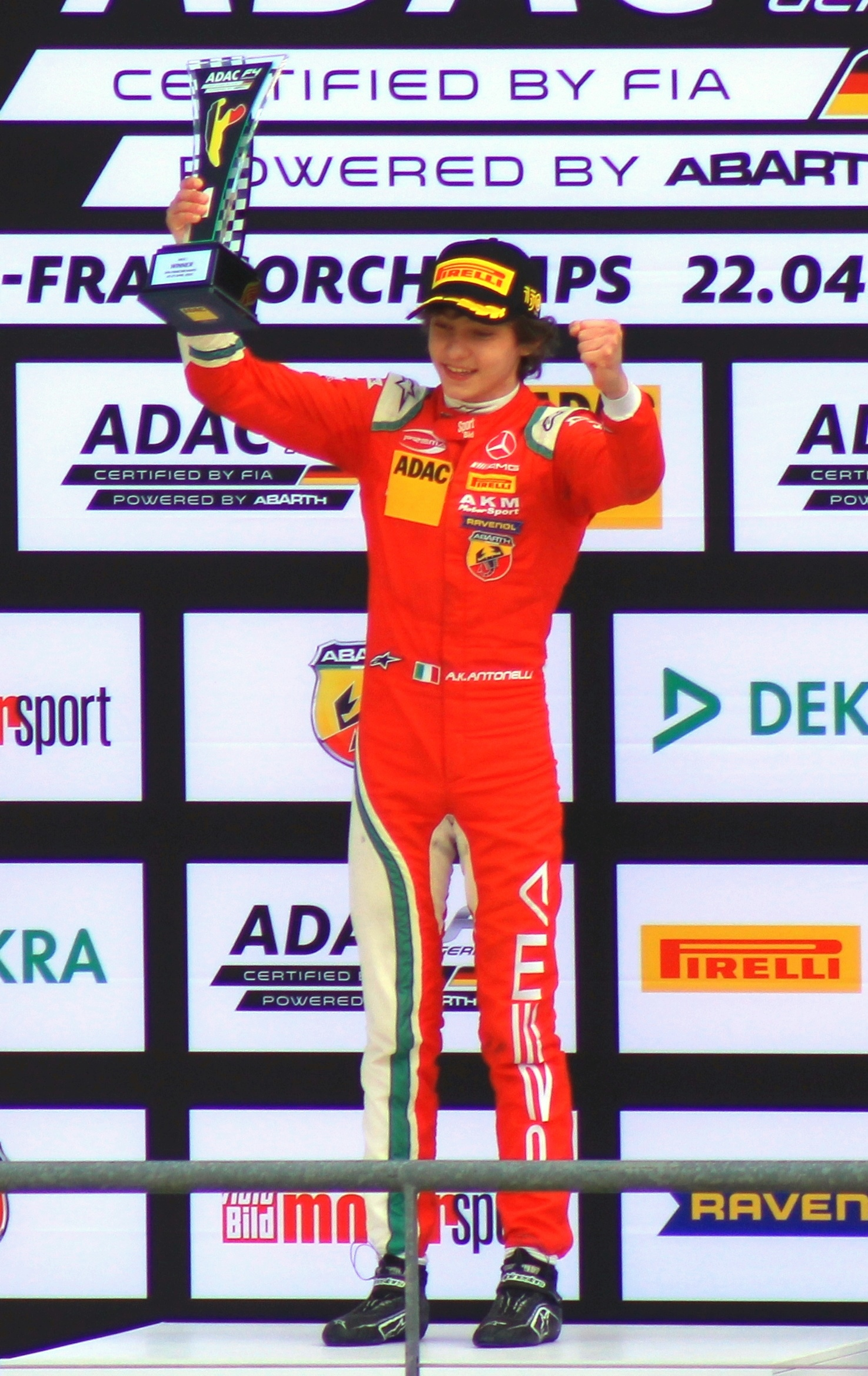
Debutant Franco Colapinto (left) replaced Logan Sargeant (center) at Williams from this Grand Prix onwards. Kimi Antonelli (right) drove for Mercedes in the first free practice session, making his Formula One practice debut.

The drivers and teams were the same as the season entry list with the exception of Franco Colapinto, who replaced Logan Sargeant at Williams from this Grand Prix onwards. Colapinto made his Formula One debut. Kimi Antonelli drove for Mercedes in place of George Russell during the first practice session, making his Formula One practice debut. Aston Martin were planning to have Felipe Drugovich drive in first practice in place of Fernando Alonso, before cancelling this plan in response to the track changes.

=== Tyre choices ===
Tyre supplier Pirelli brought the C3, C4, and C5 tyre compounds (the three softest in their range) designated hard, medium, and soft, respectively, for teams to use at this event.

=== Track changes ===
Ahead of the event, Monza Circuit underwent significant changes. In addition to facility improvements, the entire track was resurfaced. The DRS zone leading in to turn 1 was extended by 103 metres (338 ft).

== Practice ==
Three free practice sessions were held for the event. The first free practice session was held on 30 August 2024, at 13:30 local time (UTC+2), and was topped by Max Verstappen of Red Bull Racing ahead of Charles Leclerc of Ferrari and Lando Norris of McLaren. Debutant Kimi Antonelli spun at turn 11, crashing into the wall and causing the session to be stopped temporarily. The second free practice session was held on the same day, at 17:00 local time, and was topped by Lewis Hamilton of Mercedes ahead of Norris and Carlos Sainz Jr. of Ferrari. The third practice session was held on 31 August 2024, at 12:30 local time, and was topped by Hamilton ahead of his teammate George Russell and Leclerc.

== Qualifying ==
Qualifying was held on 31 August 2024, at 16:00 local time (UTC+2).

=== Qualifying classification ===
| Pos. | No. | Driver | Constructor | Qualifying times | | | Final grid |
| Pos. | No. | Driver | Constructor | Q1 | Q2 | Q3 | Final grid |
|---|---|---|---|---|---|---|---|
| 1 | 4 | (United Kingdom) Lando Norris | McLaren-Mercedes | 1:19.911 | 1:19.727 | 1:19.327 | 1 |
| 2 | 81 | (Australia) Oscar Piastri | McLaren-Mercedes | 1:20.076 | 1:19.808 | 1:19.436 | 2 |
| 3 | 63 | (United Kingdom) George Russell | Mercedes | 1:20.169 | 1:19.877 | 1:19.440 | 3 |
| 4 | 16 | (Monaco) Charles Leclerc | Ferrari | 1:20.074 | 1:20.007 | 1:19.461 | 4 |
| 5 | 55 | (Spain) Carlos Sainz Jr. | Ferrari | 1:20.149 | 1:19.799 | 1:19.467 | 5 |
| 6 | 44 | (United Kingdom) Lewis Hamilton | Mercedes | 1:20.477 | 1:19.641 | 1:19.513 | 6 |
| 7 | 1 | (Netherlands) Max Verstappen | Red Bull Racing-Honda RBPT | 1:20.226 | 1:19.662 | 1:20.022 | 7 |
| 8 | 11 | (Mexico) Sergio Pérez | Red Bull Racing-Honda RBPT | 1:20.598 | 1:20.216 | 1:20.062 | 8 |
| 9 | 23 | (Thailand) Alexander Albon | Williams-Mercedes | 1:20.542 | 1:20.314 | 1:20.299 | 9 |
| 10 | 27 | (Germany) Nico Hülkenberg | Haas-Ferrari | 1:20.781 | 1:20.411 | 1:20.339 | 10 |
| 11 | 14 | (Spain) Fernando Alonso | Aston Martin Aramco-Mercedes | 1:20.617 | 1:20.421 | N/A | 11 |
| 12 | 3 | (Australia) Daniel Ricciardo | RB-Honda RBPT | 1:20.901 | 1:20.479 | N/A | 12 |
| 13 | 20 | (Denmark) Kevin Magnussen | Haas-Ferrari | 1:20.856 | 1:20.698 | N/A | 13 |
| 14 | 10 | (France) Pierre Gasly | Alpine-Renault | 1:20.748 | 1:20.738 | N/A | 14 |
| 15 | 31 | (France) Esteban Ocon | Alpine-Renault | 1:20.764 | 1:20.766 | N/A | 15 |
| 16 | 22 | (Japan) Yuki Tsunoda | RB-Honda RBPT | 1:20.945 | N/A | N/A | 16 |
| 17 | 18 | (Canada) Lance Stroll | Aston Martin Aramco-Mercedes | 1:21.013 | N/A | N/A | 17 |
| 18 | 43 | (Argentina) Franco Colapinto | Williams-Mercedes | 1:21.061 | N/A | N/A | 18 |
| 19 | 77 | (Finland) Valtteri Bottas | Kick Sauber-Ferrari | 1:21.101 | N/A | N/A | 19 |
| 20 | 24 | (China) Zhou Guanyu | Kick Sauber-Ferrari | 1:21.445 | N/A | N/A | 20 |
107% time: 1:25.504

== Race ==
The race started at 15:00 local time (UTC+2) on 1 September 2024 and ran for 53 laps. Fourteen drivers started on medium tyres, with the remaining six choosing the hard compound. The track temperature was hot, at 52.2 °C, and there was a greater chance of rain than initially forecast.

Lando Norris held the lead off of the starting line. George Russell locked up on the opening straight and was forced to take the run-off area of turn one, suffering damage to his front wing. He lost four positions and rejoined the race in seventh. At the second chicane, Oscar Piastri performed an unexpected overtake on Norris, forcing Norris to lose momentum and allowing Charles Leclerc to overtake him, moving Norris down to third. Nico Hülkenberg was forced off the track and into a gravel trap by Daniel Ricciardo. Both cars were able to continue, but Ricciardo was issued a 5-second time penalty and 1 penalty point.

Four laps later, Hülkenberg locked up his tyres on turn 1 and collided with the other RB of Yuki Tsunoda, causing both cars damage. Hülkenberg pitted on lap 6, switching to hard tires and changing his front wing. Tsunoda retired a lap later due to floor damage sustained from the collision; Hulkenberg was later given a 10-second time penalty and 2 penalty points for his role in the incident. Leclerc's teammate Carlos Sainz Jr. initially overtook the McLarens during their first stops but ended up losing the positions to them.

Leclerc stopped early to run the hard tyres, a decision he initially criticised on team radio. However, he was shifted into first place following stops for other drivers and ended up running the tyres to the end, winning the race ahead of Piastri and Norris. Leclerc's victory marked his seventh career win and Ferrari's first win at their home race since 2019, which was also won by Leclerc. This race marked the debut of Franco Colapinto, who finished in twelfth having qualified in eighteenth. A Williams junior, Colapinto was brought in from Formula 2 early to replace Logan Sargeant, who was dropped due to underperforming. Following the race, Kevin Magnussen of Haas received penalty points on his licence for a collision with Pierre Gasly. This took Magnussen over the limit of 12 points for a rolling year, and earning him a one-race ban from the following 2024 Azerbaijan Grand Prix.

=== Race classification ===
| Pos. | No. | Driver | Constructor | Laps | Time/Retired | Grid | Points |
|---|---|---|---|---|---|---|---|
| 1 | 16 | (Monaco) Charles Leclerc | Ferrari | 53 | 1:14:40.727 | 4 | 25 |
| 2 | 81 | (Australia) Oscar Piastri | McLaren-Mercedes | 53 | +2.664 | 2 | 18 |
| 3 | 4 | (United Kingdom) Lando Norris | McLaren-Mercedes | 53 | +6.153 | 1 | 16^{a} |
| 4 | 55 | (Spain) Carlos Sainz Jr. | Ferrari | 53 | +15.621 | 5 | 12 |
| 5 | 44 | (United Kingdom) Lewis Hamilton | Mercedes | 53 | +22.820 | 6 | 10 |
| 6 | 1 | (Netherlands) Max Verstappen | Red Bull Racing-Honda RBPT | 53 | +37.932 | 7 | 8 |
| 7 | 63 | (United Kingdom) George Russell | Mercedes | 53 | +39.715 | 3 | 6 |
| 8 | 11 | (Mexico) Sergio Pérez | Red Bull Racing-Honda RBPT | 53 | +54.148 | 8 | 4 |
| 9 | 23 | (Thailand) Alexander Albon | Williams-Mercedes | 53 | +1:07.456 | 9 | 2 |
| 10 | 20 | (Denmark) Kevin Magnussen | Haas-Ferrari | 53 | +1:08.302^{b} | 13 | 1 |
| 11 | 14 | (Spain) Fernando Alonso | Aston Martin Aramco-Mercedes | 53 | +1:08.495 | 11 | |
| 12 | 43 | (Argentina) Franco Colapinto | Williams-Mercedes | 53 | +1:21.308 | 18 | |
| 13 | 3 | (Australia) Daniel Ricciardo | RB-Honda RBPT | 53 | +1:33.452^{c} | 12 | |
| 14 | 31 | (France) Esteban Ocon | Alpine-Renault | 52 | +1 lap | 15 | |
| 15 | 10 | (France) Pierre Gasly | Alpine-Renault | 52 | +1 lap | 14 | |
| 16 | 77 | (Finland) Valtteri Bottas | Kick Sauber-Ferrari | 52 | +1 lap | 19 | |
| 17 | 27 | (Germany) Nico Hülkenberg | Haas-Ferrari | 52 | +1 lap | 10 | |
| 18 | 24 | (China) Zhou Guanyu | Kick Sauber-Ferrari | 52 | +1 lap | 20 | |
| 19 | 18 | (Canada) Lance Stroll | Aston Martin Aramco-Mercedes | 52 | +1 lap | 17 | |
| Ret | 22 | (Japan) Yuki Tsunoda | RB-Honda RBPT | 7 | Overheating | 16 | |
Fastest lap: (United Kingdom) Lando Norris (McLaren-Mercedes) – 1:21.432 (lap 53)

Notes

- ^a – Includes one point for fastest lap.
- ^b – Kevin Magnussen finished ninth, but received a ten-second time penalty for causing a collision with Pierre Gasly.
- ^c – Daniel Ricciardo finished 12th, but received a total of 15 seconds in time penalties; five seconds for forcing Nico Hülkenberg off the track and ten seconds for failing to serve the penalty correctly.

== Championship standings after the race ==
Drivers' Championship standings

| Pos. | Driver | Points |
|---|---|---|
| 1 | (Netherlands) Max Verstappen | 303 |
| 2 | (United Kingdom) Lando Norris | 241 |
| 3 | (Monaco) Charles Leclerc | 217 |
| 4 | (Australia) Oscar Piastri | 197 |
| 5 | (Spain) Carlos Sainz Jr. | 184 |

Constructors' Championship standings

| Pos. | Constructor | Points |
|---|---|---|
| 1 | (Austria) Red Bull Racing-Honda RBPT | 446 |
| 2 | (United Kingdom) McLaren-Mercedes | 438 |
| 3 | (Italy) Ferrari | 407 |
| 4 | (Germany) Mercedes | 292 |
| 5 | (United Kingdom) Aston Martin Aramco-Mercedes | 74 |

- Note: Only the top five positions are included for both sets of standings.

== See also ==
- 2024 Monza Formula 2 round
- 2024 Monza Formula 3 round

| Previous race: 2024 Dutch Grand Prix | FIA Formula One World Championship; 2024 season | Next race: 2024 Azerbaijan Grand Prix |
| Previous race: 2023 Italian Grand Prix | Italian Grand Prix | Next race: 2025 Italian Grand Prix |
