= Formula One drivers from Argentina =

List of Formula One drivers who competed as Argentine

- Drivers: 26
- Grands Prix: 314
- Entries: 411
- Starts: 383
- Best season finish: 1st (1951, 1954, 1955, 1956, 1957)
- Wins: 38
- Podiums: 98
- Pole positions: 38
- Fastest laps: 37
- Points: 729.42
- First entry: 1950 British Grand Prix
- First win: 1950 Monaco Grand Prix
- Latest win: 1981 Belgian Grand Prix
- Latest entry: 2026 Las Vegas Grand Prix
- 2026 drivers: Franco Colapinto

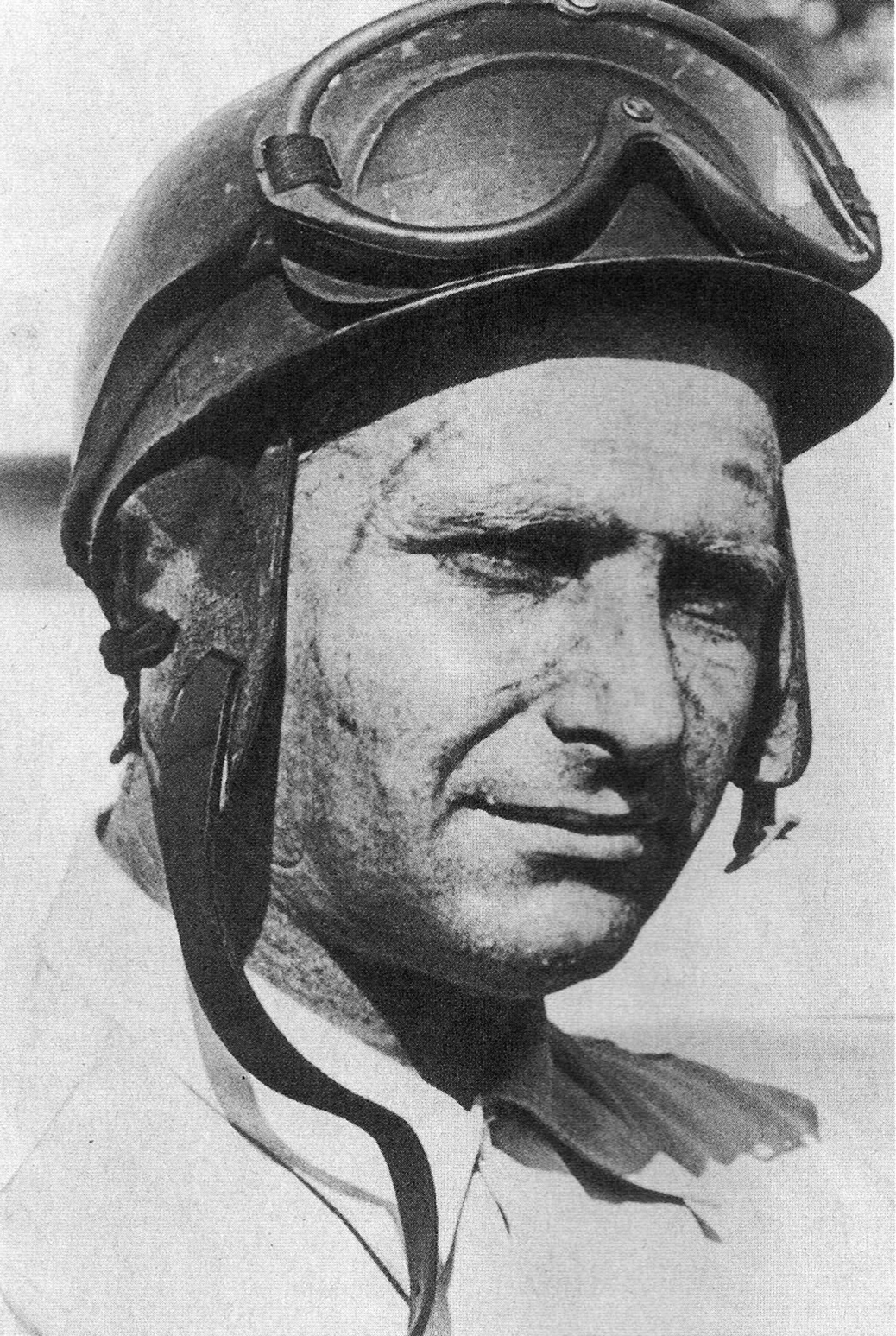
Juan Manuel Fangio

There have been 26 Formula One drivers from Argentina including one World Drivers' Champion. Juan Manuel Fangio, who is regarded as one of the greatest drivers of all time, won the title five times in the first eight seasons of the championship and was twice a runner-up.

== World champions and race winners ==
Juan Manuel Fangio is the only Drivers' Champion from Argentina winning the title five times in the 1950s. Two other Argentine drivers have won a championship race: José Froilán González and Carlos Reutemann. 23 other Argentine drivers have driven F1 cars at race weekends, with many of them only racing once and failing to finish a single race.

== Current drivers ==
Franco Colapinto competes for Alpine since the 2025 Emilia Romagna Grand Prix, replacing Jack Doohan. He made his debut with Williams Racing, replacing American Logan Sargeant part way through the 2024 Formula One World Championship.

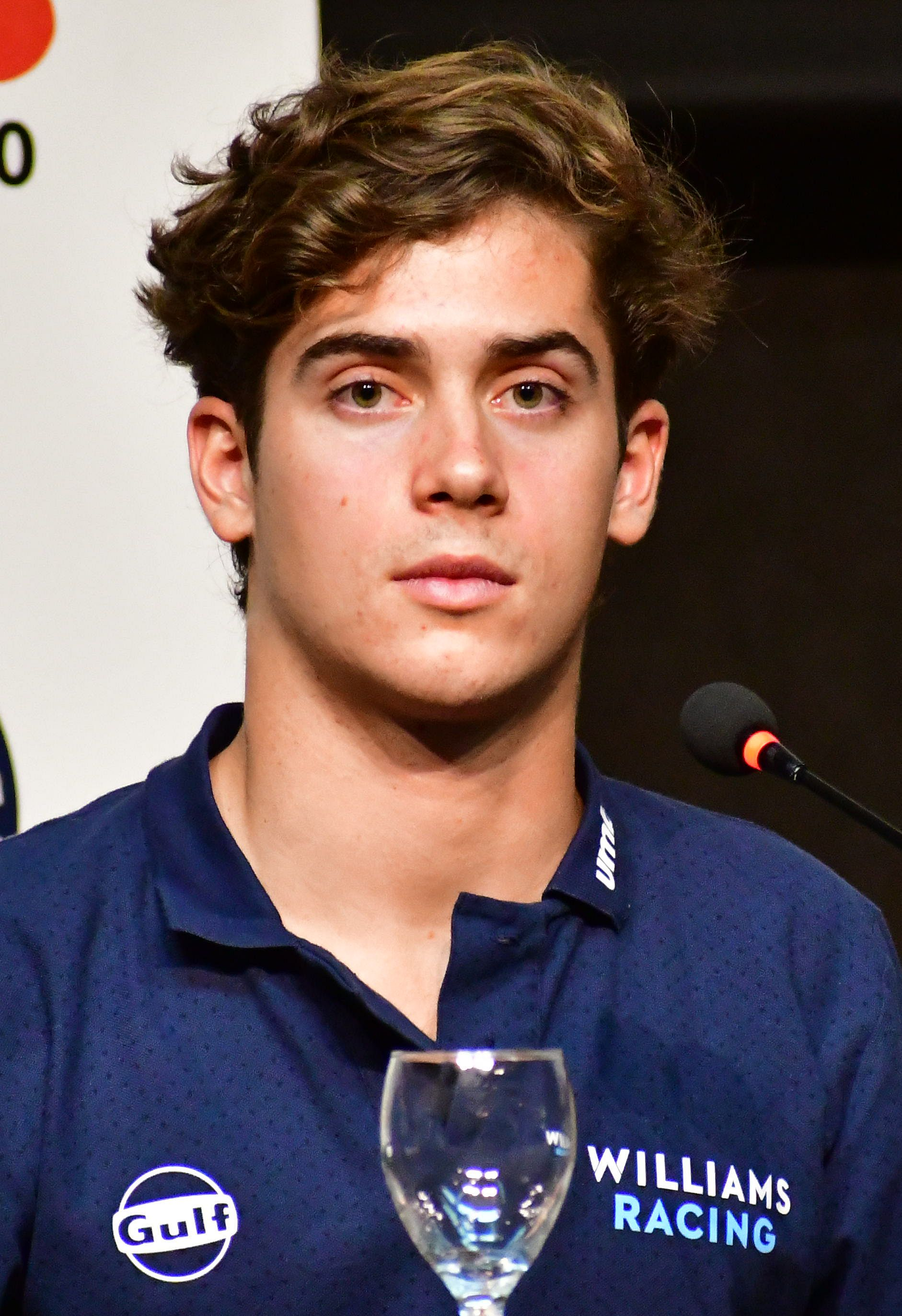
Franco Colapinto
2026 season position: 12th

== Former drivers ==
=== Notable former drivers ===
Juan Manuel Fangio won nearly half of the races he started. His victory in the 1957 German Grand Prix at Nürburgring is sometimes cited as one of the greatest drives in the history of the sport. In a poll of drivers undertaken by Autosport Fangio was voted as the third best racer in the history of Formula One, behind Michael Schumacher and Ayrton Senna. Fangio's record of winning the drivers' title five times stood for 46 years, finally being surpassed by Schumacher, and he holds several other records including the highest percentage of race wins (46% – 24 out of 52). He remains the oldest ever champion, winning his final title at the age of 46. Fangio drove for Alfa Romeo in the first Formula One World Championship season in 1950. He finished second in the title behind team mate Giuseppe Farina, winning three of six races in which he competed. He achieved five podiums out of seven on his way to his first world title in 1951 but had to sit out of the 1952 season after breaking his neck in Monza. He returned to F1 in 1953 driving for Maserati and won just one of the eight grands prix, finishing second in the Drivers' Championship to Alberto Ascari. The next four seasons saw Fangio achieve success that would not be matched for many years. Across the four seasons he won 17 of the 28 races and all four titles. He retired from the sport after two races in 1958. While some of his records have been broken, Ayrton Senna said of Fangio "Even if I or someone else can equal or beat Fangio's record, it still will not compare with his achievements."

José Froilán González was another successful 1950s Grand Prix driver from Argentina. Known as El Cabezón (Fat Head) and The Pampas Bull, González was built more like a wrestler than a modern racing driver. He was runner-up to compatriot Fangio in the 1954 season and is celebrated by Ferrari as their first Formula One championship race winner. He might have achieved other successes but González never contested a full season in any of the nine years he competed and his victory for Ferrari was his second and last win. The Autosport vote placed González as the 27th best driver of all time, stating that he would have been likely to have won more races if he had accepted the offer of a race seat at Vanwall.

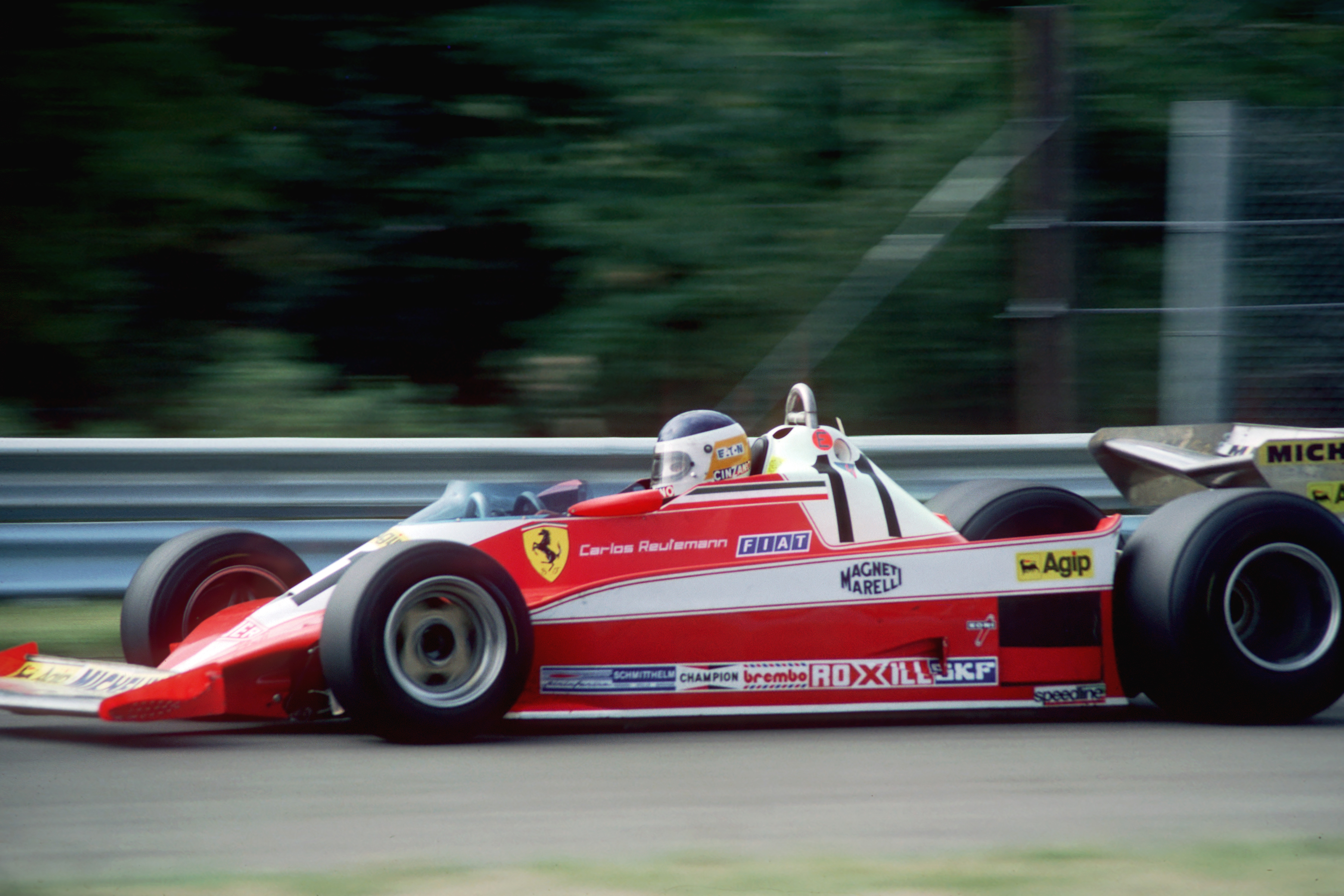
Carlos Reutemann driving a Ferrari in 1978 at Watkins Glen in the eastern United States

Carlos Reutemann is the most recent Argentine race winner to ascend the top of the podium at the 1981 Belgian Grand Prix. That victory in Belgium was the last in a career that included 12 race wins. He achieved four first-place finishes for Ferrari in 1978 and ultimately finished third in the championship. 1981 was his last complete season and Reutemann, driving for Williams, finished as runner-up in the Drivers' Championship. The following year started with a second place at the South African Grand Prix but he would only last one more race before leaving Williams and quitting the sport amidst speculation of dissension between him and the team. Team mate Keke Rosberg went on to win the championship. In the Autosport vote Reutemann was placed 34th in the list of greatest ever F1 drivers. He is one of only a small number of racers who qualified in pole position at their debut race, and also has the most third-place finishes of any driver. Reutemann went on to have a career in politics, governing Argentina's Santa Fe province.

=== Other former drivers ===
Gastón Mazzacane competed in the 2000 season with Minardi and the first four races of 2001 with Prost. After three retirements he was dropped by the Prost team and replaced by Brazilian Luciano Burti.

As well as those detailed above, the following drivers started at least ten races:

- Onofre Marimón
- Carlos Menditeguy
- Roberto Mieres
- Esteban Tuero
- Ricardo Zunino

== Driver statistics ==
Driver	Active years	Entrants	Championships	Wins	Podiums	Pole positions	Fastest laps	Career points
Juan Manuel Fangio	1950–1951, 1953–1958	52 (51 starts)	5 (1951, 1954, 1955, 1956, 1957)	24	35	29	23	277.64
José Froilán González	1950–1957, 1960	26	0	2	15	3	6	77.64
Alfredo Pián	1950	1 (0 starts)	0	0	0	0	0	0
Onofre Marimón	1951, 1953–1954	12 (11 starts)	0	0	2	0	1	8.14
Alberto Crespo	1952	1 (0 starts)	0	0	0	0	0	0
Pablo Birger	1953, 1955	2	0	0	0	0	0	0
Oscar Alfredo Gálvez	1953	1	0	0	0	0	0	2
Carlos Menditeguy	1953–1958, 1960	11 (10 starts)	0	0	1	0	0	9
Roberto Mieres	1953–1955	17	0	0	0	0	1	13
Adolfo Schwelm Cruz	1953	1	0	0	0	0	0	0
Clemar Bucci	1954–1955	5	0	0	0	0	0	0
Jorge Daponte	1953–1954	3 (2 starts)	0	0	0	0	0	0
Jesús Iglesias	1955	1	0	0	0	0	0	0
Alejandro de Tomaso	1957, 1959	2	0	0	0	0	0	0
Roberto Bonomi	1960	1	0	0	0	0	0	0
Nasif Estéfano	1960, 1962	2 (1 start)	0	0	0	0	0	0
Alberto Rodríguez Larreta	1960	1	0	0	0	0	0	0
Juan Manuel Bordeu	1961	1 (0 starts)	0	0	0	0	0	0
Carlos Reutemann	1972–1982	146	0	12	45	6	6	310
Ricardo Zunino	1979–1981	11 (10 starts)	0	0	0	0	0	0
Miguel Ángel Guerra	1981	4 (1 start)	0	0	0	0	0	0
Oscar Larrauri	1988–1989	21 (7 starts)	0	0	0	0	0	0
Norberto Fontana	1997	4	0	0	0	0	0	0
Esteban Tuero	1998	16	0	0	0	0	0	0
Gastón Mazzacane	2000–2001	21	0	0	0	0	0	0
Franco Colapinto	2024–2026	48 (46 starts)	0	0	0	0	0	32

== See also ==
- List of Formula One Grand Prix winners
