= Oscar Piastri =

Australian racing driver (born 2001)

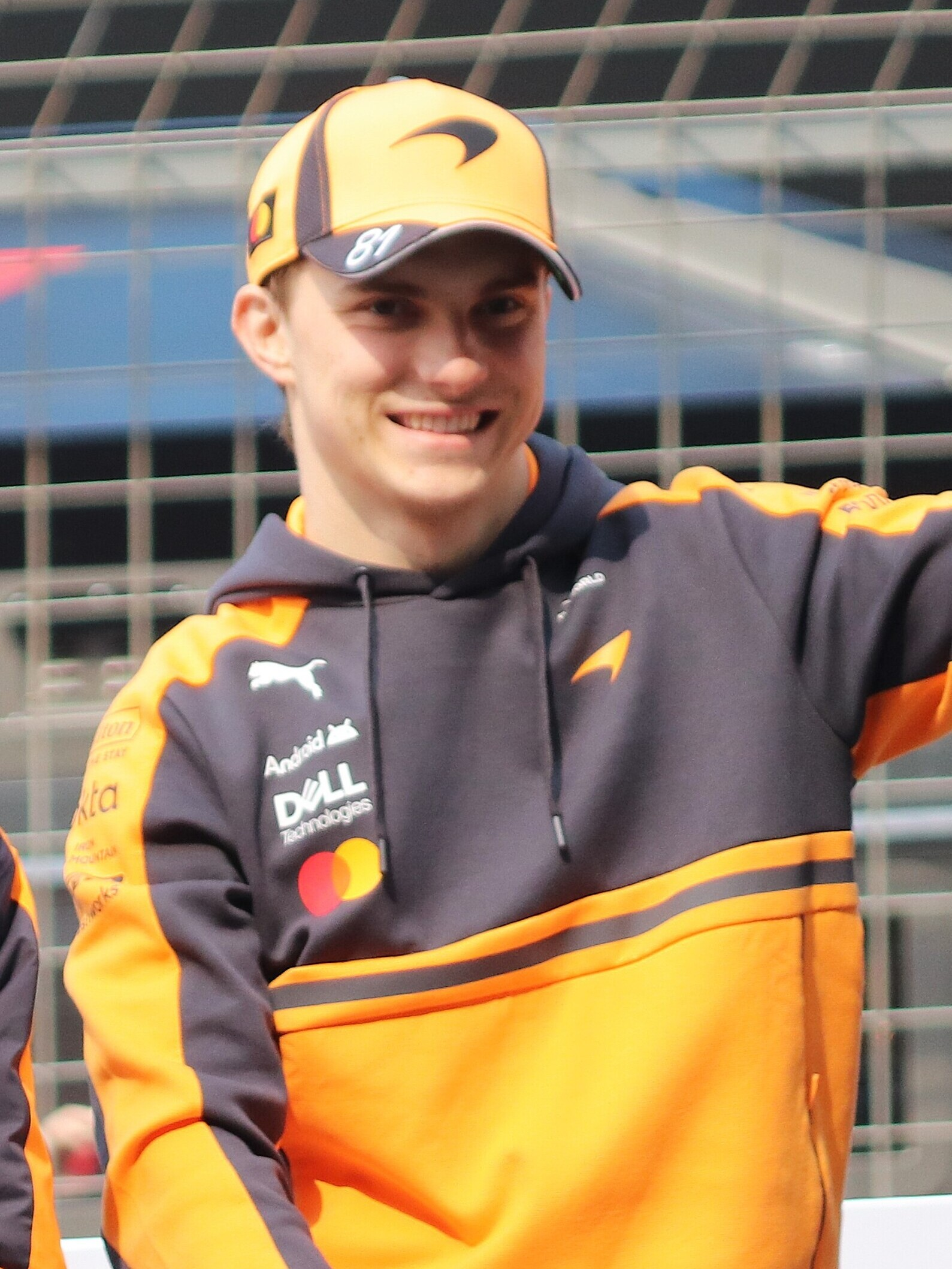
- Piastri at the 2026 Chinese Grand Prix
- Born: Oscar Jack Piastri; 6 April 2001 (age 25); Melbourne, Australia
- Awards: Full list

Formula One World Championship career
- Nationality: (Australia) Australian
- 2026 team: McLaren-Mercedes
- Car number: 81
- Entries: 90 (88 starts)
- Championships: 0
- Wins: 9
- Podiums: 28
- Career points: 951
- Pole positions: 6
- Fastest laps: 9
- First entry: 2023 Bahrain Grand Prix
- First win: 2024 Hungarian Grand Prix
- Last win: 2025 Dutch Grand Prix
- Last entry: 2026 São Paulo Grand Prix
- 2025 position: 3rd (410 pts)

Previous series
- 2021; 2020; 2018–2019; 2017–2018; 2017; 2016–2017: FIA Formula 2; FIA Formula 3; Formula Renault Eurocup; Formula Renault NEC; F4 British; F4 UAE

Championship titles
- 2021; 2020; 2019: FIA Formula 2; FIA Formula 3; Formula Renault Eurocup
- Website: oscarpiastri.com

Oscar Jack Piastri (/piˈæstriː/ pee-AST-ree, Italian: [ˈpjastri]; born 6 April 2001) is an Australian racing driver who competes in Formula One for McLaren. Piastri has won nine Formula One Grands Prix across four seasons.

Born and raised in Melbourne, Piastri began his career in radio-controlled racing before moving into karting aged 10, where he won several regional titles. Graduating to junior formulae in 2016, Piastri won his first championship at the 2019 Formula Renault Eurocup with R-ace GP. He then won both the 2020 FIA Formula 3 and 2021 FIA Formula 2 Championships back-to-back with Prema, becoming the sixth driver in history to win the GP2/Formula 2 title in their rookie season. Piastri is the only driver in history to win Formula Renault, Formula Three, and Formula Two—or equivalent—championships in successive seasons.

A member of the Alpine Academy from 2020 to 2022, (Note: Known until 2021 as the Renault Sport Academy.) Piastri signed with McLaren in 2023 to partner Lando Norris, following a contract dispute with Alpine. He made his Formula One debut at the Bahrain Grand Prix, achieving his first career podium in his rookie season at the Japanese Grand Prix. Retaining his seat for 2024, Piastri achieved his maiden victory in Hungary, which he repeated in Azerbaijan, becoming the fifth Australian to win a Formula One Grand Prix. In 2025, he took seven further victories, as well as his maiden pole position at the Chinese Grand Prix, as he finished third in a title battle with Norris and Max Verstappen.

As of the 2026 São Paulo Grand Prix, Piastri has achieved nine race wins, six pole positions, nine fastest laps, and 28 podiums in Formula One. Piastri is contracted to remain at McLaren until at least the end of the 2028 season.

== Early life ==
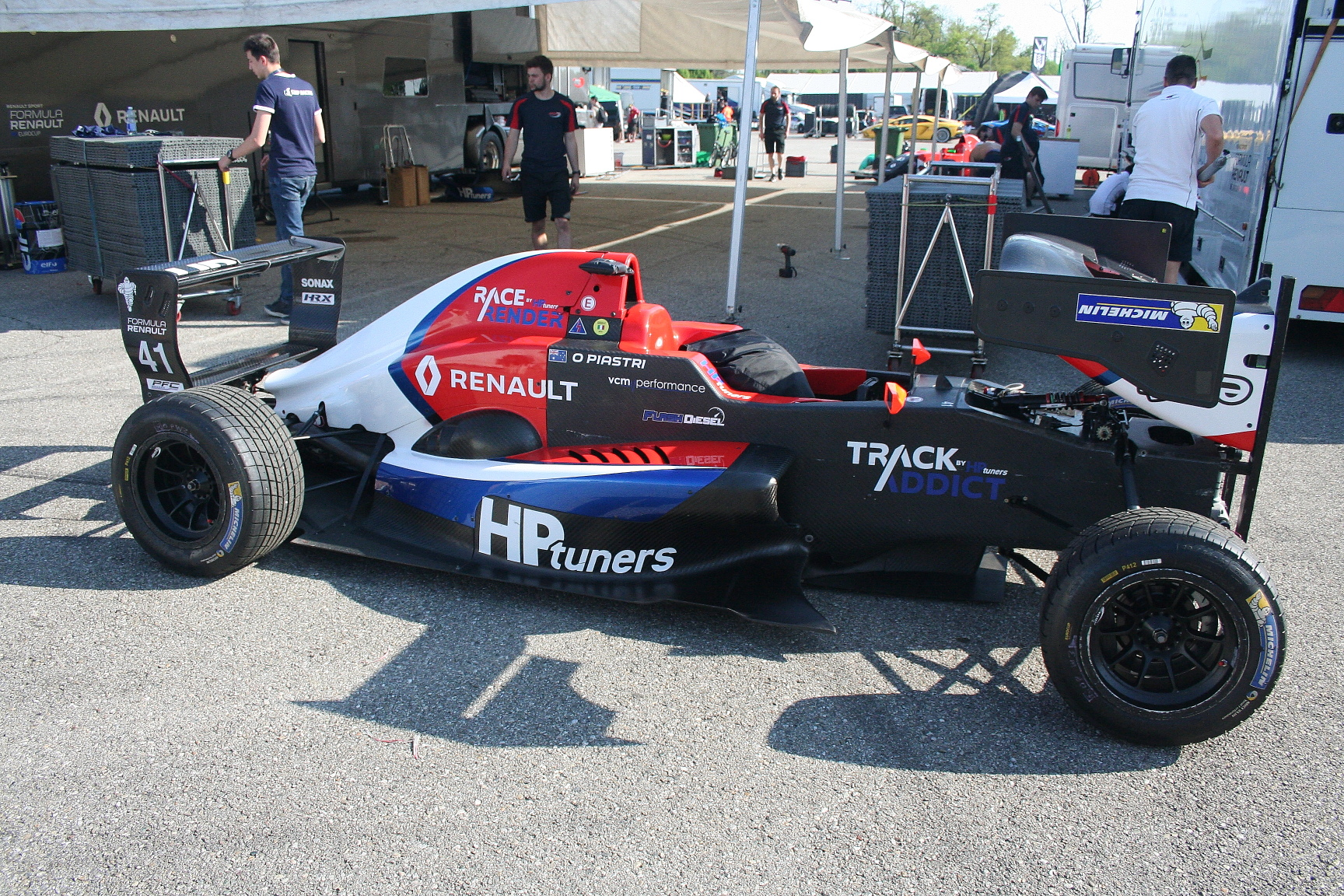
Piastri was sponsored by his father's company, HP Tuners, throughout his junior formulae career.

Oscar Jack Piastri was born on 6 April 2001 in Melbourne, Victoria, Australia. His father, Chris Piastri, is the founder and owner of HP Tuners, an automotive software company; the company sponsored his junior formulae career with up to A$6.5 million. He served as Piastri's kart mechanic as he contested national championships in Australia. His mother, Nicole Piastri (née MacFadyen), helped raise him in the suburb of Brighton with his three younger sisters—Hattie, Edie, and Mae. He claims Italian, Yugoslavian, and Chinese heritage from his father, as well as Scottish and Irish from his mother. His bedtime stories frequently consisted of automotive books, prompting his father to buy him a radio-controlled car on a business trip when he was six, which he began racing in his backyard.

Piastri began racing competitively aged nine with Remote Control Racing Australia, winning the secondary class of the national championship before moving into kart racing. Aged 14, he moved with his father—who returned to Melbourne six months later—to Hertford, England, to continue his international racing career in Europe. Having been privately educated at Haileybury, he moved to its sister school in Hertford Heath—whose alumni include Stirling Moss—as a boarding pupil on a sports scholarship. By the end of 2015, Piastri began travelling for karting tests and competitions between Italy, France, Belgium, Sweden, Spain, and Portugal from Stansted Airport, costing his father around £250,000. In 2019, he was taken under the wing of nine-time Grand Prix winner Mark Webber and his wife, Ann; the former served as his manager until 2026 and negotiated his move to Formula One.

== Junior racing career ==
=== Karting (2011–2016) ===
==== 2011–2015: State titles in Australia ====
Following his successes in radio-controlled racing, Piastri moved into kart racing in 2011 at the local Oakleigh Go Kart Racing Club (OGKRC) in Clayton South, aged 10. A protégé of two-time Australian Champion James Sera, he began competing for the club that year in an FA Kart chassis. He won his first title two years later: the 2013 CIK Stars of Karting in the Rookies class. In 2014, he won the OGKRC Championship, City of Melbourne Titles, South Australian Championship, and National Sprint Classic Champion of Champions in Junior Clubman—he claimed a A$500 prize for the latter. He further claimed runner-up in the Australian National Sprint Championship and the Victorian Championship, before progressing to international competition in the IAME International Final at Le Mans; he finished third on his debut in X30 Junior from twenty-first on the grid. He closed his national career with third in the KF3 Australian Championship—where he was ranked the Top Qualifier—as well as victory in the Victorian Championship, OGKRC's Junior Top Guns, the Gold Coast Race of Stars, and the City of Melbourne Titles again in 2015.

==== 2015–2016: Move to the European scene ====
I knew it was a necessary step if I wanted to have a chance to make it to Formula One; you can't become a Formula One driver by staying in Australia.

— Piastri discussing his move to Europe with The New York Times in 2023

With the support of Sera and talent scout Rob McIntyre, Piastri moved to compete in Europe from 2015 onwards with Kosmic. Vroomkart later contrasted his career path to that of Ayrton Senna, having both progressed from RC racing to European karting after a transcontinental move. In KF-Junior, he claimed twelfth in the European Championship round at Portimão—where he finished twenty-sixth overall—and entered one round of the WSK Super Master Series. In 2016, he returned to Australia to claim his third successive City of Melbourne Titles. In Europe, he joined Ricky Flynn Motorsport in OK-Junior, where he finished tenth in the South Garda Winter Cup, twelfth in the WSK Super Master Series, and eighth in the WSK Final Cup. Back-to-back podiums at Portimão saw him claim sixteenth in the European Championship. He qualified fourth for the World Championship at Sakhir after winning his heat; his pre-final saw him drop to eighteenth before recovering to finish sixth overall in his final karting appearance.

=== Formula 4 (2016–2017) ===
==== 2016–2017: Junior formulae debut in the UAE ====
Following his sixth-place at the Karting World Championship in OK-Junior, Piastri made his junior formulae debut in the second round of the Formula 4 UAE Championship at Yas Marina with Dragon F4; in a nine-driver field, he claimed sixth, fifth, fourth, and fifth on debut. He then scored a pair of fourth-places at Dubai before claiming two podiums on his return to Yas Marina—his final appearance in the series, ending the season sixth overall having contested 11 of 18 races.

==== 2017: Runner-up in British F4 ====
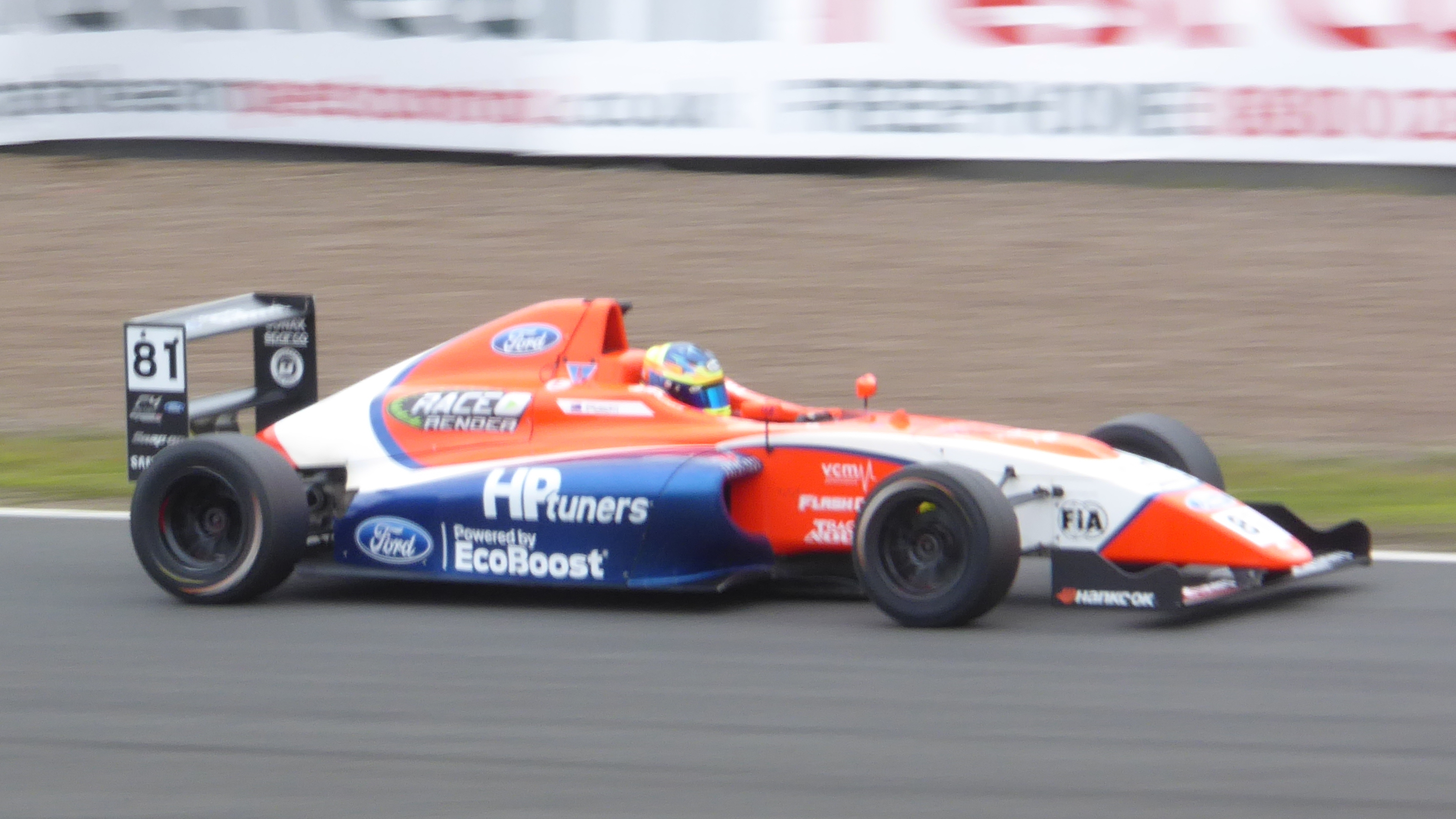
Piastri finished runner-up to Jamie Caroline in his rookie British F4 season.

Piastri moved to the F4 British Championship for 2017 with Arden, owned by Christian Horner—who later revealed he turned down the chance to sign Piastri to the Red Bull Junior Team. He opened his campaign with two podiums at Brands Hatch, which he repeated in the third race at Donington Park, marred by the accident of Billy Monger. After another podium at Thruxton, he claimed his maiden F4 victory in the second race at Oulton Park to move second in the championship. Podiums in each race at Croft and two victories from pole position each at Snetterton and Knockhill consolidated his position. He came under pressure from Logan Sargeant after two retirements at Rockingham. A triple podium at Silverstone, including victory in the final race, extended his advantage, before he clinched the runner-up spot to the second-year Jamie Caroline with top-five finishes at Brands Hatch. He closed the season on 376.5 points—20.5 ahead of Sargeant and 65.5 behind Caroline—with six victories from 15 podiums and six pole positions. He later credited "learning from [his] mistakes in F4" as his greatest lesson in junior formulae.

=== Formula Renault 2.0 (2017–2019) ===
==== 2017: Northern European Cup debut ====
Following his British F4 campaign, Piastri debuted in the Formula Renault Northern European Cup at the season-ending Hockenheimring round with Arden. He claimed eighth in both races, ending the season twenty-first overall. He was subsequently invited to attend the Formula Renault 2.0 rookie test at Barcelona-Catalunya, setting the fifth-fastest time.

==== 2018: Podiums in the Eurocup ====
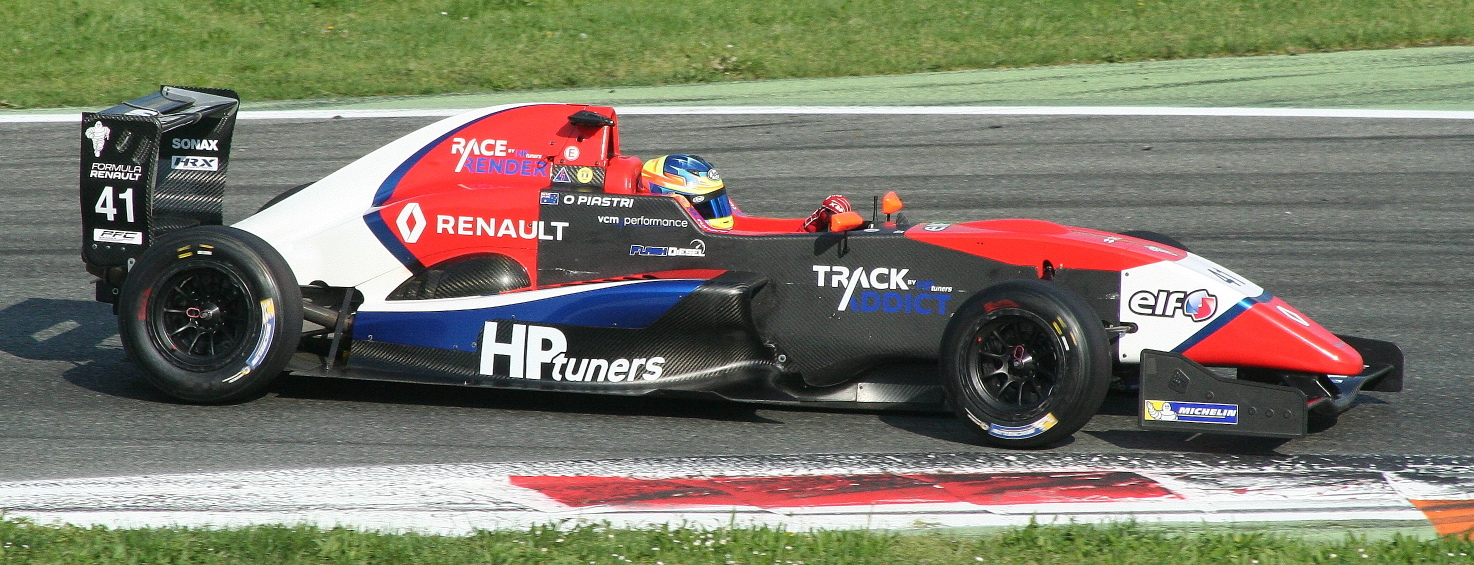
In Formula Renault 2.0, Piastri took three podiums across his Eurocup campaign in 2018.

Piastri remained with Arden for his Eurocup debut in 2018. After claiming sixth and fifth on debut at Paul Ricard, he scored no points at Monza, including a retirement. He finished fourth in the second race at Silverstone before dropping outside of the points again in Monaco. Following his sixth- and ninth-placed finishes at the Red Bull Ring, Piastri achieved his maiden podium finish at Spa-Francorchamps with third in the opening race. Back-to-back points at the Hungaroring extended his run of points finishes to six races, which ended in the first race at the Nürburgring; he claimed seventh in race two. With podiums in both races at the Hockenheimring—finishing third and second—he surpassed Alex Peroni for eighth in the championship, which he retained amidst non-scoring races at the season-ending Barcelona-Catalunya round. He closed his campaign with 110 points—165.5 behind champion Max Fewtrell—and three podiums.

==== 2019: Maiden title ====
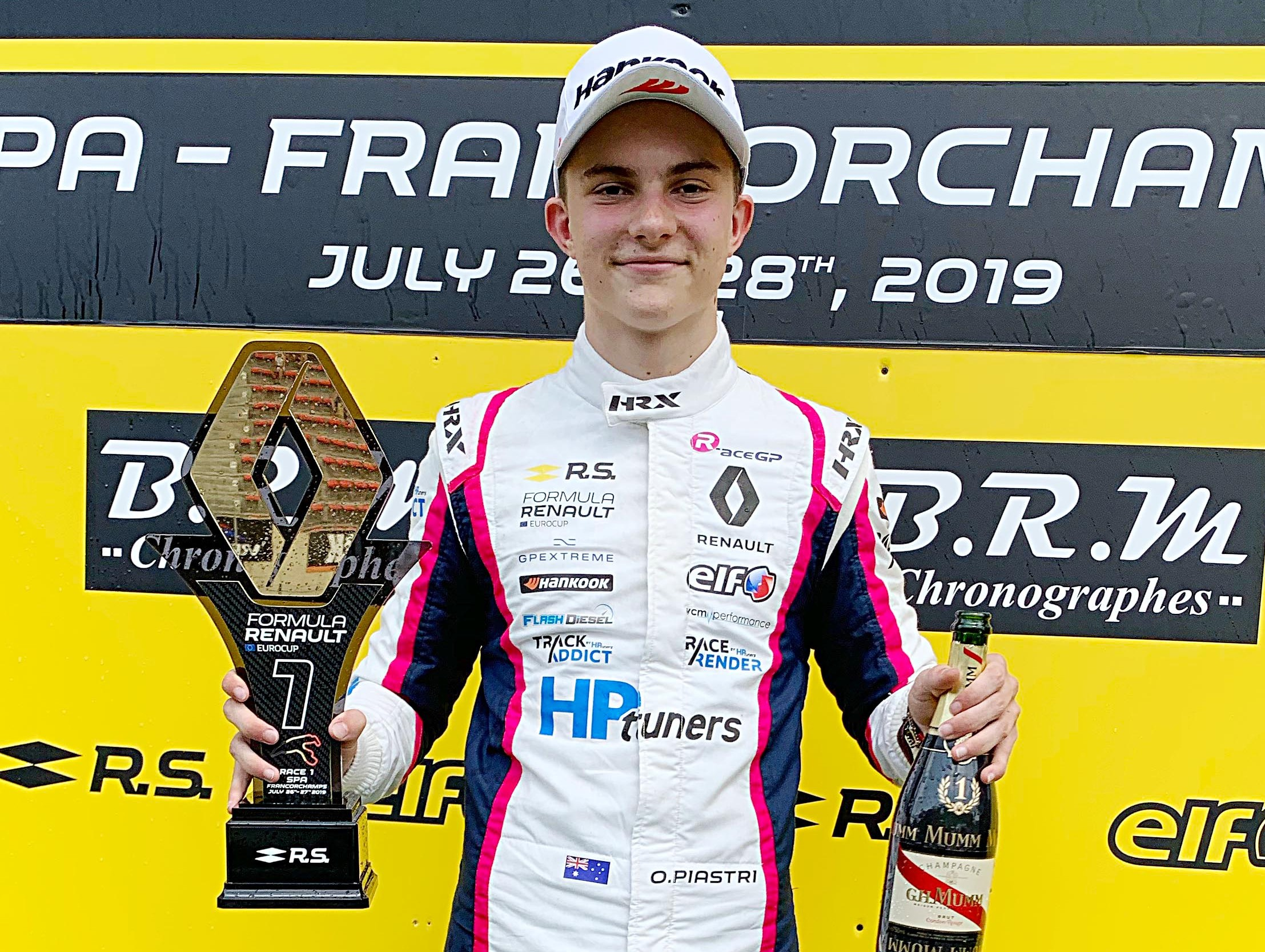
Piastri won the Eurocup in 2019 amidst a title battle with Victor Martins, his first junior championship.

Piastri—now competing under a British licence—joined reigning champions R-ace GP for the 2019 Eurocup. His campaign opened with eighteenth and fourth at Monza. He took his maiden victory from pole position in the first race at Silverstone, which he repeated in the second. He claimed fourth and fifth in Monaco, before returning to the podium with second at Paul Ricard, where he finished sixth in race two. He closed Victor Martins's championship lead to two points with victory in the opening race at Spa-Francorchamps and levelled the standings with his fourth-place in race two. He opened a 40-point advantage by winning both races at the Nürburgring from pole. A formation lap crash at the Hungaroring after aquaplaning reduced the gap by 12.5 points with Martins's victory, (Note: Victor Martins was awarded half points for his victory in race one at the Hungaroring as the race was abandoned after three laps due to adverse weather conditions.) which he mitigated by winning the second race from pole. Martins closed his lead to 5.5 points with three consecutive wins from pole at the penultimate Barcelona-Catalunya and Hockenheimring rounds as Piastri finished fifth, third, and second, the latter after an early battle for the lead—his second-place in race two extended it by eight. At Yas Marina, Piastri held off the late advances of Martins to win the opening race, meaning he would clinch the title by finishing seventh or higher in the final race, irrespective of other results. With fourth-place, Piastri clinched his first junior formulae championship by 7.5 points to Martins, having achieved seven wins from 11 podiums and five pole positions. Bruce Williams of Auto Action described it as a "a considerable step towards a Formula One career".

=== FIA Formula 3 (2020) ===
In 2018, Piastri partook in the GP3 Series post-season test at Yas Marina with Trident. (Note: The GP3 Series merged with the FIA Formula 3 European Championship to form the FIA Formula 3 Championship in 2019.) He returned for the 2019 post-season test with reigning FIA Formula 3 champions Prema. Now managed by Mark Webber and a member of the Renault Sport Academy, he signed with Prema for 2020 alongside former F4 rival Logan Sargeant and reigning Formula Regional European champion Frederik Vesti. The season was delayed and shortened due to the COVID-19 pandemic. Stating that "fighting for the championship definitely is not out of the question", Piastri qualified third on debut in Spielberg; avoiding damage in a first-corner collision with polesitter Sebastián Fernández, he passed Lirim Zendeli at Ams Ag to claim a debut feature race victory, before finishing eighth in the reverse-grid sprint. (Note: In the 2020 FIA Formula 3 Championship, the top 10 finishers in the feature race were subjected to a reverse-grid in the sprint race.) At the second Spielberg round, he claimed fourth in the curtailed feature and fifth in the sprint to retain his championship lead over Vesti and Sargeant. Back-to-back second-placed finishes in Budapest—as well as in the Silverstone feature—increased his advantage to 25 points, prior to losing eight with a drag reduction system failure in the latter sprint. He fell a point behind Sargeant after claiming seventh and sixth at the second Silverstone round following reliability issues in qualifying, which he retained in Barcelona by recovering from a sixth-placed feature to win the sprint, courtesy of four opening-lap overtakes.

At Spa-Francorchamps, Sargeant extended his lead to seven points over Piastri—who claimed fifth and sixth, the latter after a penalty for an illegal overtake on Richard Verschoor—with his sprint victory. Piastri reclaimed the lead at the penultimate Monza round, where he climbed from fifteenth to third in the feature; he retired from the sprint after a collision with Clément Novalak and David Schumacher at Variante del Rettifilo, which was neutralised by Sargeant's late crash with Vesti. Eight points above Sargeant and 24 above the ART of Théo Pourchaire into the season-ending Mugello round, Piastri—carrying over a five-place grid penalty for forcing David Beckmann off-track—lined up sixteenth on the feature grid; unable to score points in eleventh, he entered the sprint tied with Sargeant—who started fifth—and nine points clear of Pourchaire in eighth. Sargeant was eliminated in a first-lap collision with Zendeli at Luco as Piastri passed four drivers, including Pourchaire, for seventh. Pourchaire reclaimed the position on the safety car restart, but was unable to close the gap with his podium as Piastri clinched seventh and the title. He closed his campaign on 164 points—three ahead of Pourchaire and four ahead of Sargeant—with two victories from six podiums. He credited improvements in his racecraft with helping him deal with the increased competition and subsequently became a Formula One test driver for Renault.

=== FIA Formula 2 (2021) ===
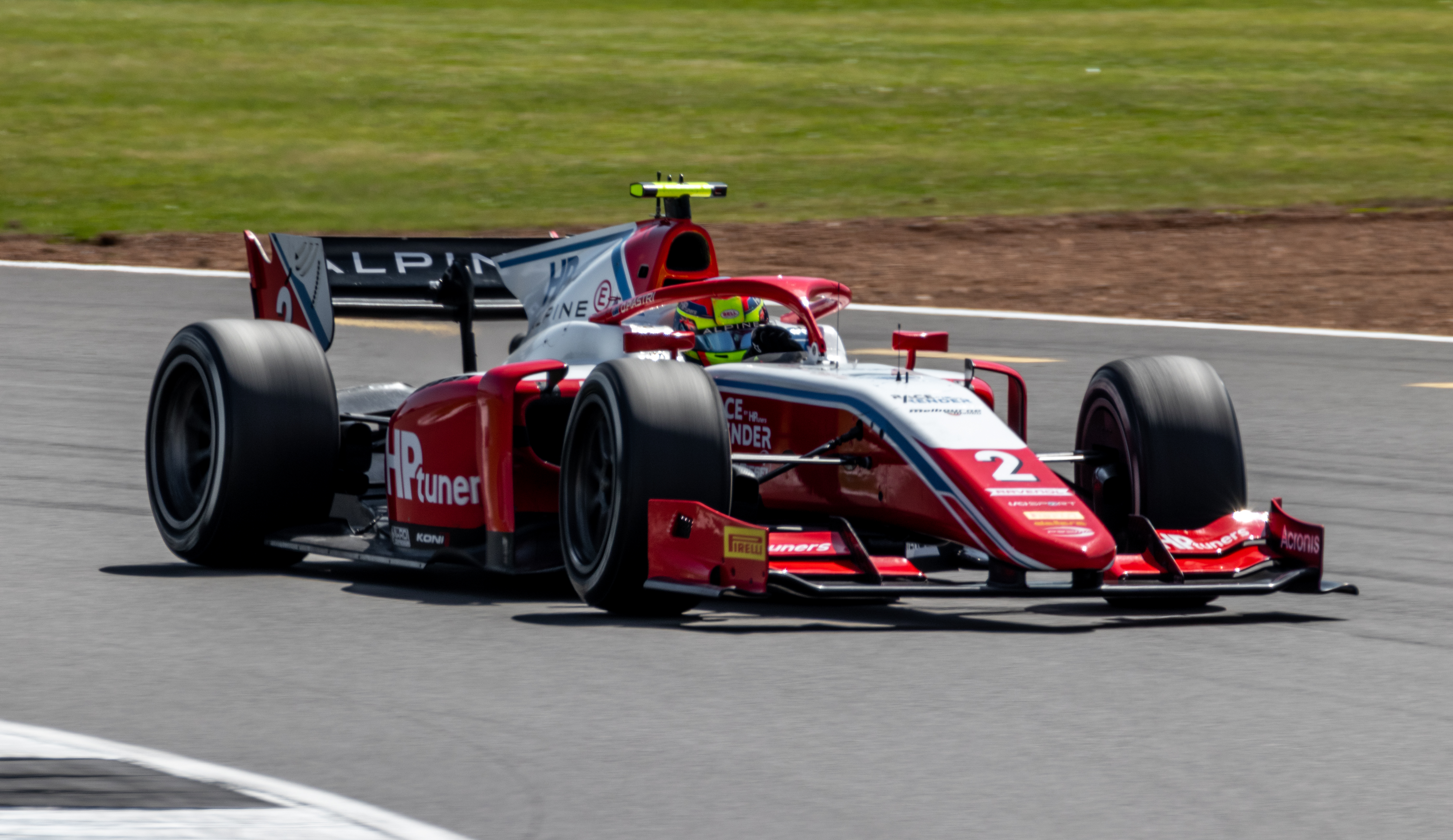
In 2021, Piastri won the FIA Formula 2 Championship in his rookie season with Prema.

Piastri remained with Prema for his 2021 campaign in FIA Formula 2, replacing Mick Schumacher to partner Ferrari Driver Academy member Robert Shwartzman. He debuted in Formula Two machinery during the three-day 2020 post-season test at Sakhir. Prior to the season, he stated that he was expecting a "very challenging year", with plans to remain in the category for two years. Piastri qualified seventh on debut at Sakhir, finishing fifth in the reverse-grid first sprint race. Starting sixth for the second sprint, (Note: In the 2021 FIA Formula 2 Championship, the top 10 qualifiers were subjected to a reverse-grid in the first sprint race, the results of which were subjected to another reversal for the second sprint.) he took his maiden victory after seven overtakes in the closing seven laps, following a pit stop for option tyres behind the safety car, claiming the lead from Zhou Guanyu on the final tour. He then made several overtakes to lead the feature, before retiring amidst a collision with Dan Ticktum while battling for third on the third from last lap. Qualifying third in both Monte Carlo and Baku, (Note: Since 2017, qualifying for the Monte Carlo FIA Formula 2 round had been split into two groups; qualifying position in each group decided the starting grid-row, with the order of each row decided by the fastest time between them. Piastri qualified second in his group and, with a faster time than Dan Ticktum, was classified third overall.) he claimed second in the second sprint and feature at the former, as well as the latter feature. Following his maiden pole position at Silverstone, he finished sixth, fourth, and third to claim the championship lead from Zhou.

After ending fourth and seventh in the Monza sprints, Piastri won the feature from pole in a battle with Zhou, which he repeated at Sochi with Théo Pourchaire. He took two further victories at Jeddah: he won the second sprint and the feature from pole, the latter being aborted in the wake of several red flag incidents. His fifth consecutive pole at Yas Island saw him start tenth in the first sprint, where he claimed third in a late battle with teammate and runner-up Shwartzman to clinch the title; he closed the season with his record fourth successive feature victory. Across his campaign, Piastri took 252.5 points—60.5 ahead of Shwartzman—with six wins from 11 podiums and five pole positions. He became the sixth driver in history to win the GP2/F2 title in their rookie season, (Note: In 2021, Piastri became the sixth driver in history to win the GP2/F2 title in their rookie season, after: Nico Rosberg (2005), Lewis Hamilton (2006), Nico Hülkenberg (2009), Charles Leclerc (2017), and George Russell (2018).) the third to win the GP3/F3 and GP2/F2 titles in successive seasons, (Note: In 2021, Piastri became the fifth driver in history to win the GP3/F3 and GP2/F2 titles in successive seasons, after: Charles Leclerc and George Russell.) and the first to win Formula Renault, Formula Three, and Formula Two—or equivalent—championships in successive seasons. Piastri was named FIA Rookie of the Year for his efforts in 2021, stating "[he had] done basically everything [he] could [to prove himself]".

== Formula One career ==
=== Renault / Alpine test driver (2020–2022) ===
In January 2020, three months after clinching the Formula Renault Eurocup, Piastri became a member of the Renault Sport Academy. He conducted his first test with Renault upon winning the FIA Formula 3 Championship that year, completing nearly 500 km (310 mi) in the R.S.18 at Sakhir. He retained his place at the re-branded Alpine Academy in 2021, for whom he tested the A521 at the Yas Marina post-season test, as well as the R.S.18 again at Silverstone and Monza.

After his FIA Formula 2 title victory, Piastri was appointed the reserve driver of Alpine for their 2022 campaign, amidst links to an Alfa Romeo move; he was also made available in the role for McLaren following an agreement between the two teams. He completed around 3,000 km (1,900 mi) of further private tests in the A521 throughout the season—part of an "intense" training programme. Prior to the São Paulo Grand Prix, he completed a private two-day test for McLaren at Paul Ricard in the MCL35M, before entering post-season testing in the MCL36; he conducted his final rookie test with the team across two days at Barcelona-Catalunya.

==== 2022 contract dispute ====
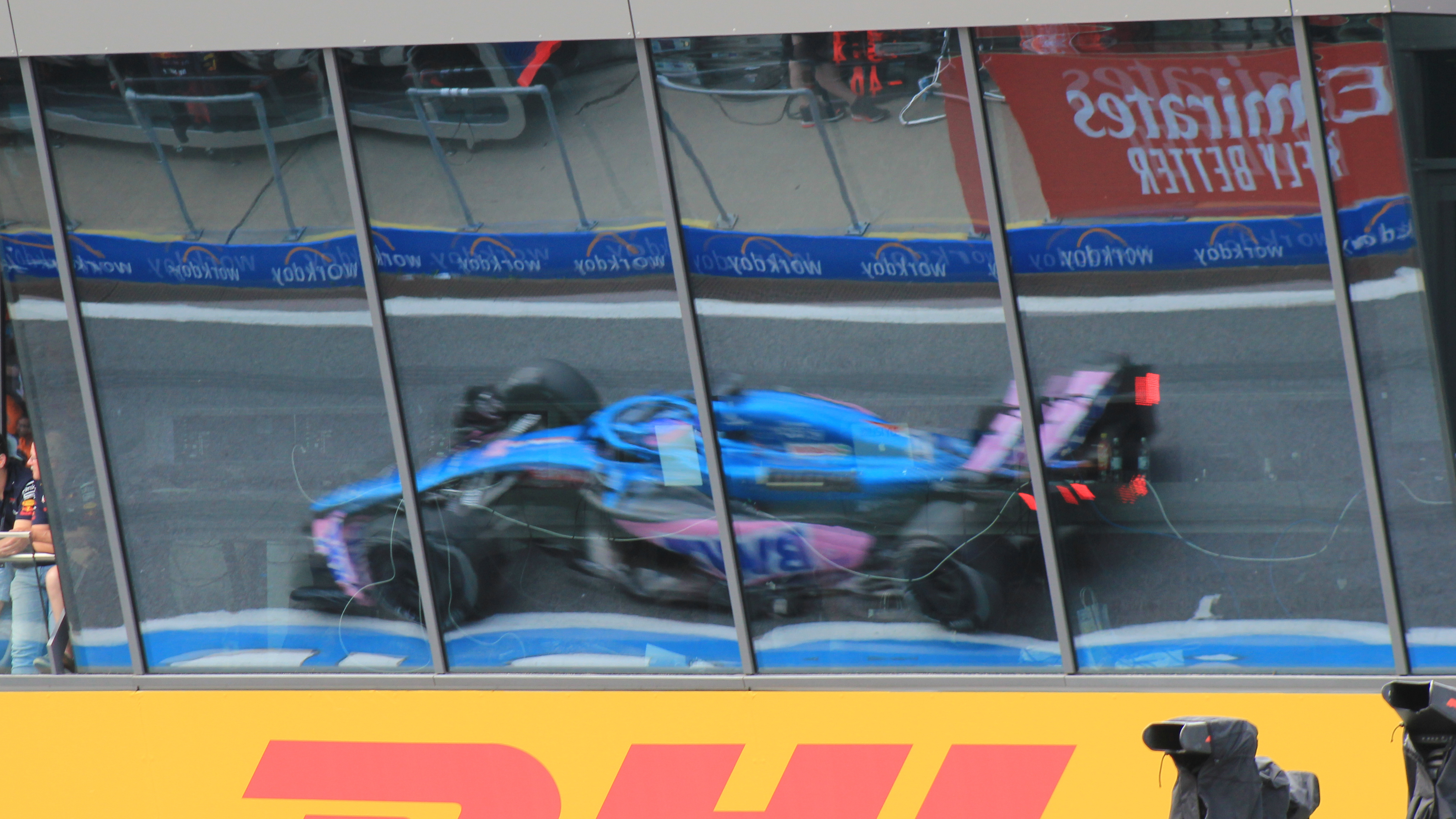
Alpine falsely claimed Piastri had signed for them in 2022, leading to a widely publicised contract dispute.

In June 2022, Piastri was offered a seat with Williams for 2023 on a two-year loan from Alpine, who were expected to retain Esteban Ocon and Fernando Alonso. In August, Alonso announced that he would replace the retiring Sebastian Vettel at Aston Martin. Alpine then announced that Piastri would be his replacement, in a press release absent of comments from Piastri himself. He rejected their announcement two hours later via Twitter, stating that he had not signed a contract and would not be driving for them in 2023. Team principal Otmar Szafnauer criticised his actions and "integrity as a human being", stating that he expected loyalty from Piastri and further threatened to take legal action. It soon emerged that Piastri was instead in talks with McLaren.

I understand that, without my agreement, Alpine F1 have put out a press release late this afternoon that I am driving for them next year. This is wrong and I have not signed a contract with Alpine for 2023. I will not be driving for Alpine next year.

— Piastri via Twitter, denying the Alpine press release two hours later

A hearing of the FIA Contract Recognition Board (CRB) commenced four weeks later to determine whether Piastri was contracted to Alpine, or if he was a free agent—victory for Alpine could have obligated Piastri to either fulfil the contract for 2023, or required an interested team to activate a release clause for his services. Prior to the Dutch Grand Prix, the CRB ruled against Alpine, followed by an immediate announcement that Piastri would instead join McLaren. In their final judgment, the CRB revealed that Piastri had signed his McLaren contract almost a month prior to the Alpine announcement—4 July, the day after the British Grand Prix. He was initially only guaranteed a reserve role, prior to the termination of Daniel Ricciardo in the week before the CRB hearing. Piastri later claimed a "breakdown in trust" between him and Alpine was behind his decision to leave.

=== McLaren (2023–present) ===
==== 2023: Rookie season and maiden podium ====
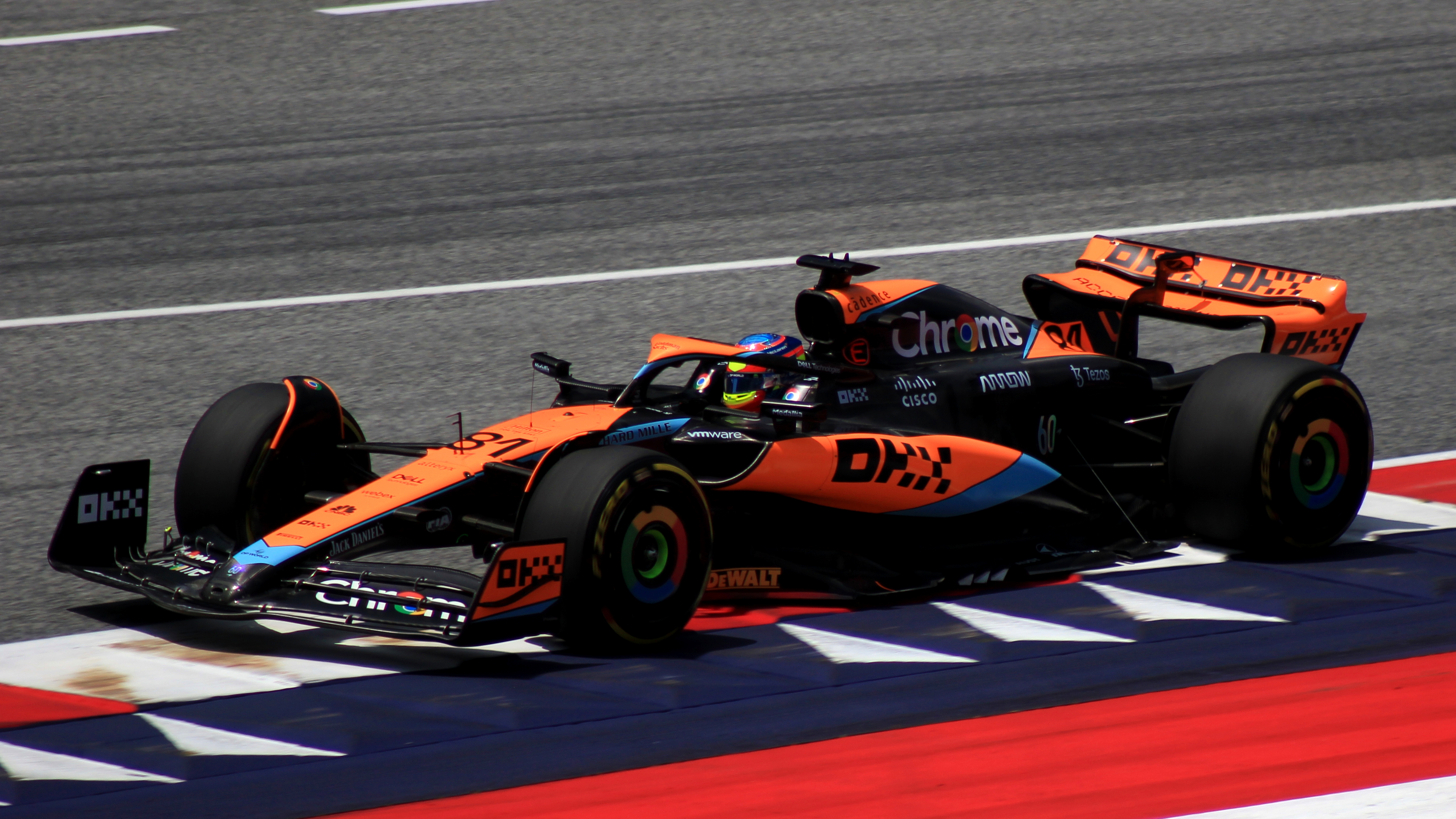
Piastri (pictured at the Austrian Grand Prix) debuted in Formula One with McLaren in 2023.

Piastri signed for McLaren in 2023, replacing fellow Australian Daniel Ricciardo to partner Lando Norris. On debut at the Bahrain Grand Prix, Piastri qualified eighteenth amidst performance concerns with the MCL60, before retiring from twelfth with an electrical issue. He started eighth in Saudi Arabia prior to dropping outside the points with front wing damage sustained in a first-lap collision with Pierre Gasly. His maiden points finish came at his home Grand Prix in Australia, claiming eighth after starting sixteenth. He finished outside the points with eleventh and nineteenth at the Azerbaijan and Miami Grands Prix, respectively, suffering contact with Alexander Albon at the former and reliability issues at the latter. A tenth-placed finish saw him claim a point in Monaco, before a run of three further non–point finishes—in Spain, Canada, and Austria. Major upgrades for the British Grand Prix saw Piastri qualify third and finish fourth, before finishing fifth in Hungary. He qualified second for the Belgium sprint, retaining the position after a battle for the lead with Max Verstappen; he retired from the Grand Prix subsequent to a first-corner collision with Carlos Sainz Jr. Following a ninth-place at the Dutch Grand Prix, he finished twelfth in Italy upon front wing damage from Lewis Hamilton, taking his maiden fastest lap after the resultant pit stop. He qualified seventeenth in Singapore after a red flag, where he recovered to seventh. Finishing third after starting on the front-row at the Japanese Grand Prix, he became the first rookie to achieve a podium finish since Lance Stroll in 2017. He then took pole for the Qatar Grand Prix sprint, holding off Verstappen to claim his maiden sprint victory; he finished second in the main race, having started sixth. He retired from the United States Grand Prix following a collision with Esteban Ocon, and claimed eighth in Mexico City. He sustained first-lap damage enroute to fourteenth in São Paulo, before closing his rookie season with tenth- and sixth-placed finishes in Las Vegas and Abu Dhabi—qualifying third at the latter. Piastri finished ninth in the World Drivers' Championship with two podiums and 97 points, 108 behind teammate Norris in sixth; his results led to a multi-year contract extension with McLaren until at least the end of 2026.

==== 2024: Maiden wins ====
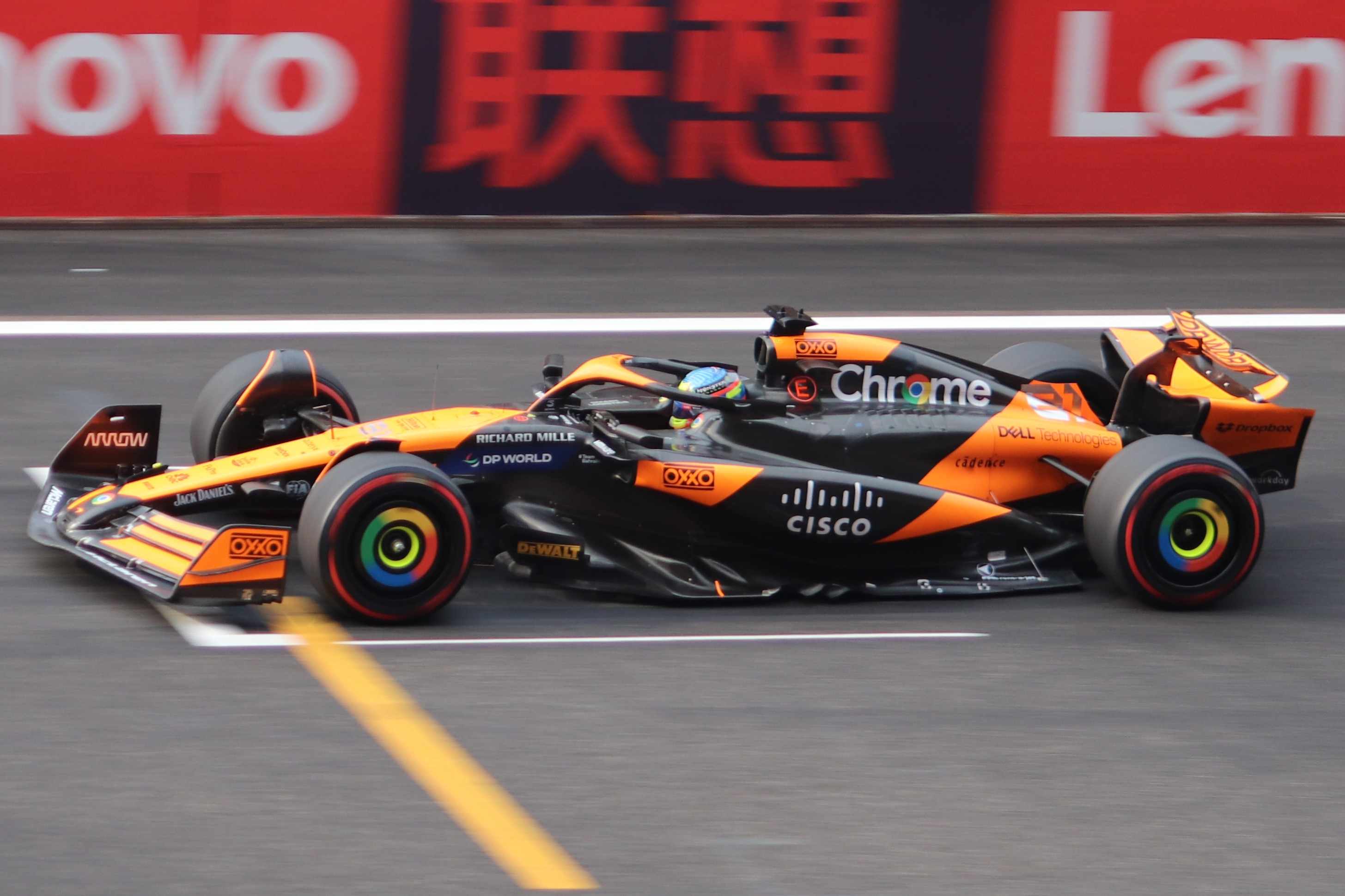
Piastri (pictured at the Chinese Grand Prix) retained his seat in 2024 as McLaren emerged as challengers to Red Bull.

Piastri opened his 2024 campaign with eighth at the Bahrain Grand Prix, followed by fourth-placed finishes in Saudi Arabia and Australia. He claimed eighth again at both the Japanese and Chinese Grands Prix. In Miami, McLaren emerged as challengers to championship leaders Red Bull; Piastri dropped to thirteenth following a collision in his battle for second with Carlos Sainz Jr., as teammate Lando Norris took victory. He qualified second at the Emilia Romagna Grand Prix—demoted to fifth due to a grid penalty for impeding Kevin Magnussen—and finished fourth. Piastri qualified and finished second to Charles Leclerc at the Monaco Grand Prix, prior to claiming fifth and seventh at the Canadian and Spanish Grands Prix, respectively. He finished second in both the sprint and main race at the Austrian Grand Prix. In Britain, he climbed to second from fifth in the wet before a belated switch to intermediate tyres dropped him to fourth; he fractured a rib during the Grand Prix due to an improper seat fit, which he sustained until the summer break. Piastri qualified second for the Hungarian Grand Prix before overtaking teammate Norris into the first corner; McLaren then controversially allowed Norris to undercut him prior to ordering a position-swap. He allowed Piastri past with two laps remaining, who claimed his maiden victory to become the fifth Australian to win a Formula One Grand Prix. Norris commented that the result was "fair" and "honest", conceding that he lost the race at the start.

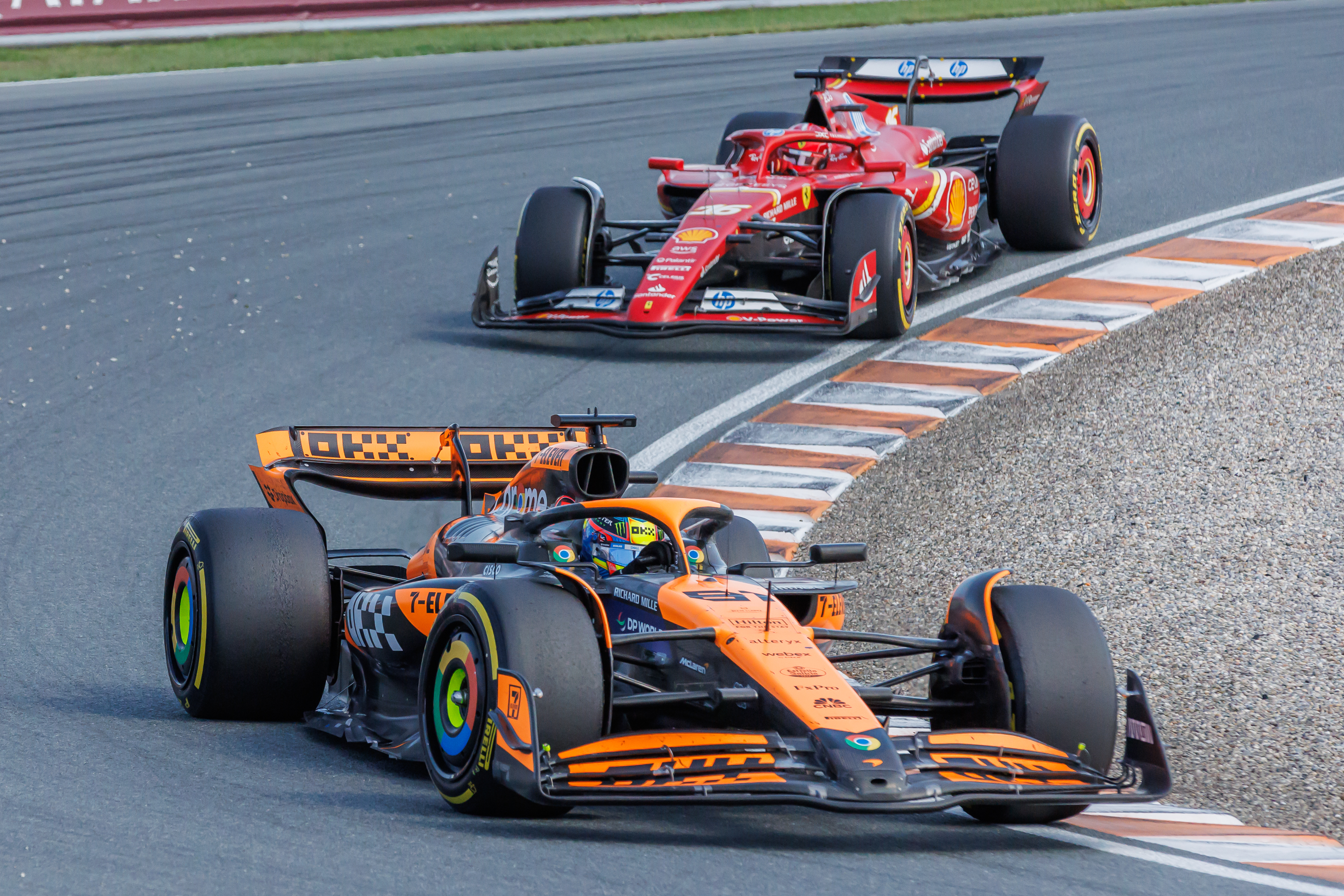
Piastri (pictured at the Dutch Grand Prix) took two victories as McLaren won the World Constructors' Championship.

Piastri finished second in Belgium after a disqualification for George Russell, promoting him to fourth in the standings—ahead of Sainz—before finishing fourth at the Dutch Grand Prix. He led the majority of the Italian Grand Prix after a first-lap overtake on Norris, before a strategic error saw him finish second to the one-stop of Leclerc. Qualifying second to Leclerc in Azerbaijan, Piastri claimed another victory following a race-long battle for the lead. The victory marked Piastri's 50th Formula One start and McLaren's first win at the Bahrain Grand Prix. He then took third in Singapore, before finishing fifth at the United States Grand Prix. Eighth-placed finishes at the Mexico City and São Paulo Grands Prix—including second at the latter sprint after being ordered to allow Norris to win—were followed by seventh-place in Las Vegas after a false start penalty. Norris returned the favour at the chequered flag for the Qatar Grand Prix sprint, allowing Piastri to take victory before he finished third in the main race. He finished the season-ending Abu Dhabi Grand Prix in tenth after a first-lap collision with Max Verstappen. Piastri ended the season fourth in the World Drivers' Championship on 292 points—82 behind runner-up Norris—with two victories from eight podiums, helping McLaren win their first World Constructors' Championship since 1998.

==== 2025: Three-way title battle vs. Norris and Verstappen ====
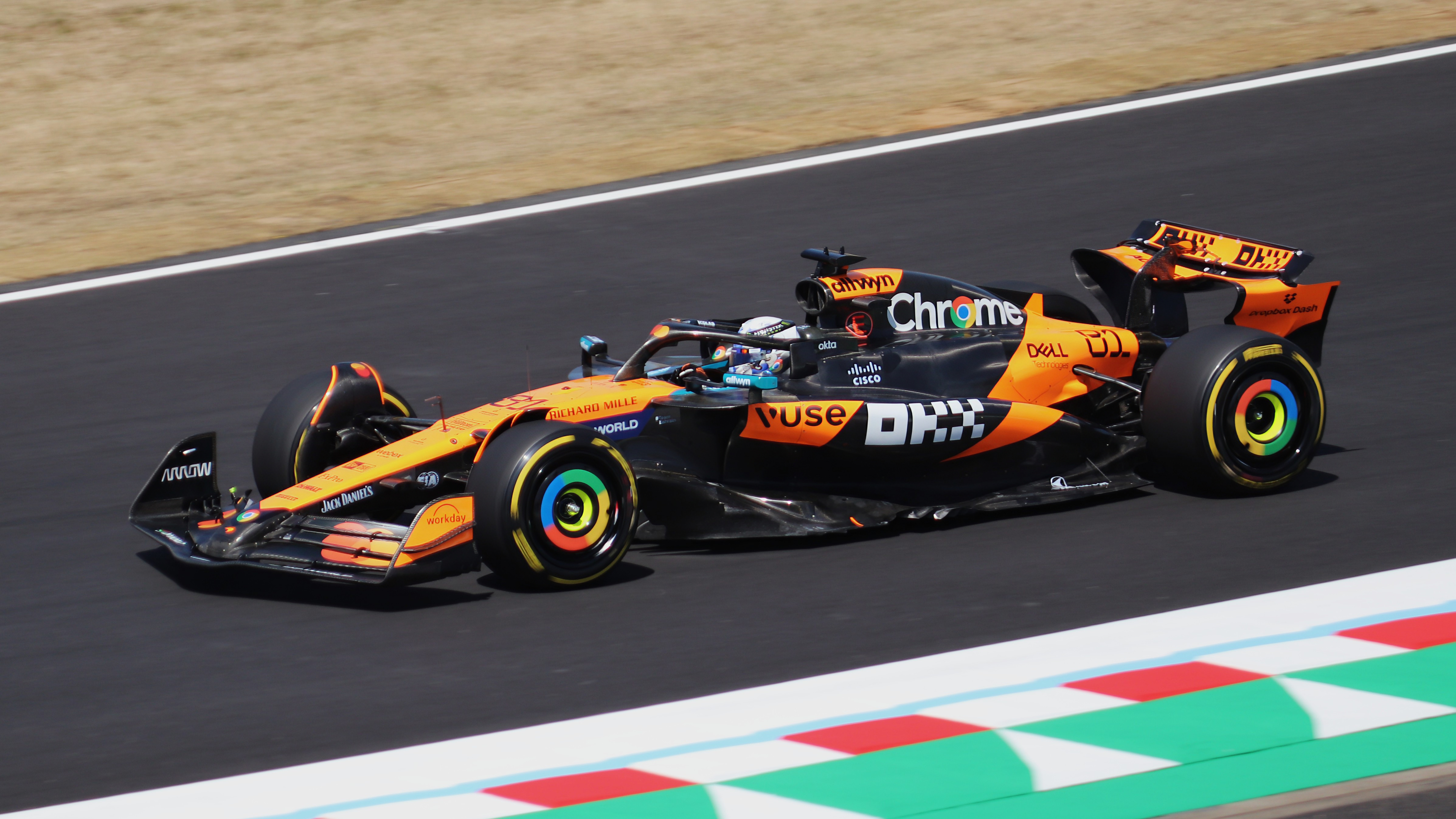
Piastri (pictured at the Japanese Grand Prix) was one of the favourites ahead of the 2025 World Drivers' Championship.

McLaren entered 2025 as title favourites, with Piastri expected to challenge teammate Lando Norris for the World Drivers' Championship. Three days prior to the start of his campaign, McLaren announced a multi-year contract extension with Piastri until at least the end of the 2028 season. He qualified on the front-row for the season-opening Australian Grand Prix, behind teammate Norris; he challenged Norris for the lead before spinning in wet conditions and leaving the track, ultimately finishing ninth. After finishing second in the sprint, he took his maiden pole position at the Chinese Grand Prix, dominating the race ahead of Norris to claim his first victory of the season. He finished third in Japan behind Max Verstappen and Norris. Piastri took pole for the Bahrain Grand Prix, cruising to a 15-second winning margin and moving within three points of Norris. He took another victory in Saudi Arabia to become the first Australian to lead the World Drivers' Championship since 2010. He finished second in the Miami Grand Prix sprint after a late safety car put him behind Norris, before winning the main race. On pole for the Emilia Romagna Grand Prix, he finished third after a first-corner overtake by Verstappen and a strategic error. He won the Spanish Grand Prix after starting on pole, and finished fourth in Canada, where championship rival Norris attempted to overtake him and crashed into the pit wall, extending Piastri's lead to 22 points.

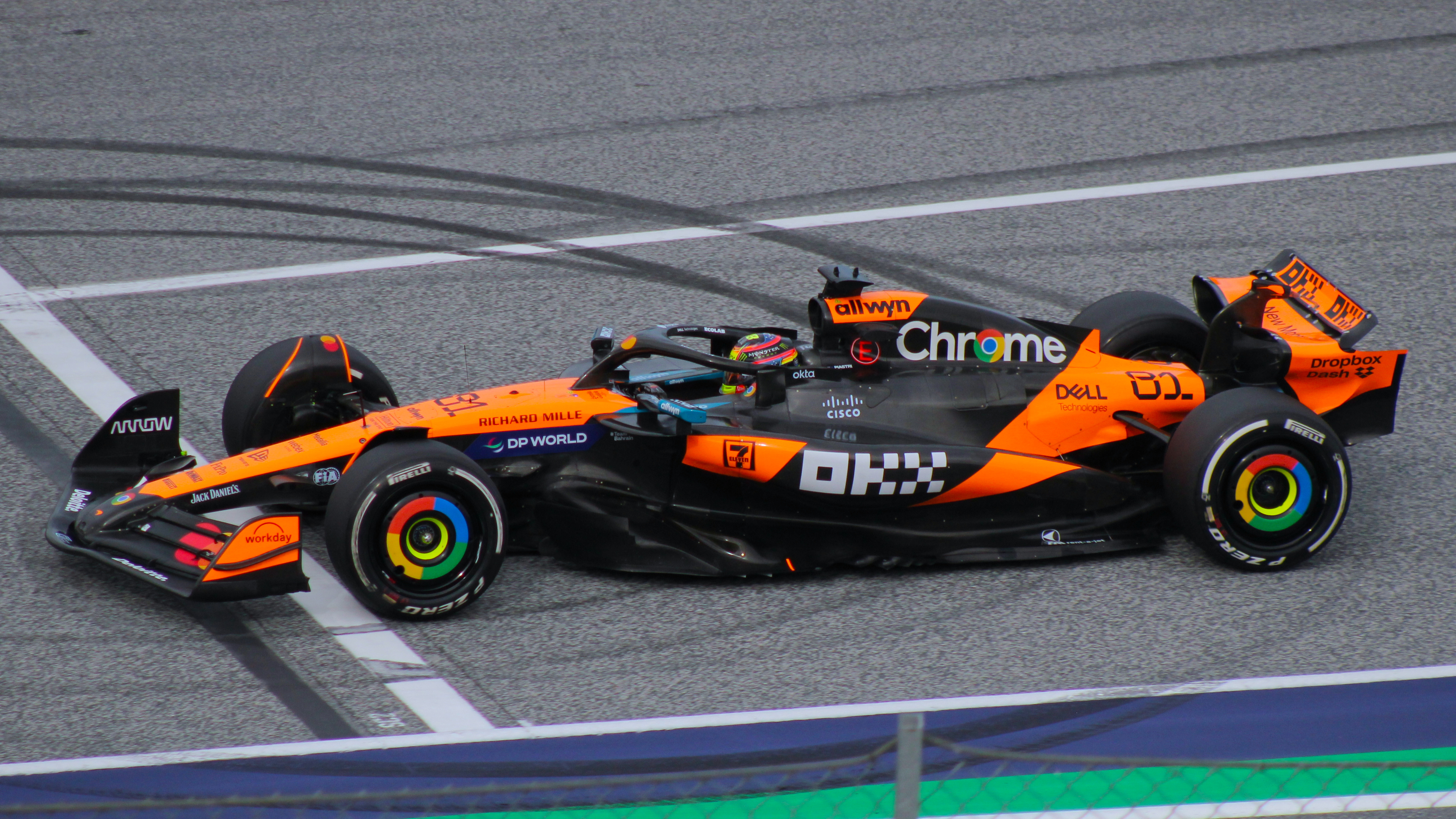
A title battle between Piastri and teammate Lando Norris emerged at the Austrian Grand Prix.

Piastri finished second in Austria after a race-long battle with Norris, narrowly avoiding another collision after locking his brakes at Rauch. He led the majority of the wet-weather British Grand Prix before receiving a penalty for inadvertently brake testing Verstappen on a restart, conceding the victory to Norris. He finished second to Verstappen from pole in the Belgium sprint prior to his victory in the wet–dry Grand Prix, which followed an early overtake on polesitter Norris at the exit of Raidillon. He qualified second—ahead of Norris—in Hungary, where Norris beat him to victory on a one-stop strategy. He took pole for the Dutch Grand Prix and held off Norris until his teammate's late engine failure, achieving his maiden grand chelem and increasing his advantage to 34 points. Verstappen—104 points behind—re-emerged as a distant title threat in Italy, where Piastri held third until a slow pit stop for Norris elevated him to second; he was controversially ordered to cede the position and settled for third. He crashed out of qualifying in Azerbaijan; starting ninth, he jumped the start, stalled, and crashed into Turn Five on the opening lap, recording his first retirement in 45 Grands Prix and conceding six points to Norris, as well as 25 to Verstappen. First-lap contact with Norris in Singapore dropped Piastri behind him in fourth, as McLaren clinched the World Constructors' Championship with a joint-record six remaining Grands Prix.

Another first-corner collision with Norris in the United States sprint saw both retire after Piastri was hit by Nico Hülkenberg in an attempted switchback on Norris for second, which neutralised intra-team "repercussions" Norris was set to face after Singapore; Piastri dropped to fifth in the Grand Prix as Verstappen and Norris—first and second, respectively—closed his advantage to 40 and 14 points. Starting seventh and enduring a mid-race battle with both Mercedes drivers in Mexico City, he finished fifth again and dropped a point behind the victorious Norris. As Norris dominated in São Paulo, Piastri crashed out of third in the sprint in drying conditions at the Senna 'S' and was penalised for colliding with Kimi Antonelli—causing the retirement of Charles Leclerc—in the Grand Prix, dropping from second to fifth. He was initially classified fourth in Las Vegas before both he and Norris were disqualified for skid block wear, levelling him with race-winner Verstappen. Piastri won the Qatar sprint event from pole position to gain more points on Norris and Verstappen, and finished second in the main race after a strategic error by McLaren allowed Verstappen to win the Grand Prix ahead of Piastri at Lusail. The results in Qatar meant that Piastri who had led the Drivers' Championship for much of the season had now slipped to third in the standings, two points behind Verstappen. At the season finale in Abu Dhabi, Piastri qualified third and finished second. As Verstappen won the Grand Prix in Abu Dhabi from pole, with team mate Norris in third, this meant Piastri finished the season third in the standings, 13 points behind eventual champion and McLaren team mate Norris. Piastri finished the season with seven victories and 16 podiums, both records for an Australian driver. He also passed Daniel Ricciardo and equalled Mark Webber in career victories. Piastri's season has been described by himself as one he can be "proud" of, and one of "mighty rise, but uncontrollable fall" by the media.

==== 2026: New regulations ====
Piastri remained with McLaren for new power unit and chassis regulations in 2026. Having qualified fifth for his home race, the season-opening Australian Grand Prix, he crashed on his reconnaissance lap due to an unexpected engine surge whilst driving over a kerb and failed to start the race. At the Chinese Grand Prix, he scored points by finishing sixth in the sprint and then qualified fifth for the race, but again failed to start due to an electrical issue before the formation lap. He finished second at the Japanese Grand Prix, behind Kimi Antonelli. At the Miami Grand Prix, Piastri placed second in the sprint, before qualifying seventh and finishing third in the main race. He finished fourth in the Canadian Grand Prix sprint and eleventh in the main race. In the first European race of the season, Piastri finished fifth on track at the Monaco Grand Prix, and was promoted to fourth after a time penalty for Alpine driver Pierre Gasly, but lost the position after an appeal that overturned Gasly's penalty. Subsequently, he finished fifth again in Barcelona-Catalunya, and fourth in Austria. At the British Grand Prix, Piastri placed seventh in the sprint race and qualified eighth for the main race. He finished eleventh in the main race, having made contact with Racing Bulls driver Liam Lawson and sustained damage to his car during the opening lap. At the Belgian Grand Prix, he finished seventh in qualifying, but started the race sixth due to teammate Lando Norris' ten-place grid penalty, eventually finishing fifth. Following a three-place grid penalty for Lewis Hamilton, Piastri qualified third for the Hungarian Grand Prix. He spent multiple laps as the race leader before a collision with Carlos Sainz Jr., and eventually had to retire on the fifty-sixth lap due to a gearbox problem.

Following the summer break, Piastri qualified fourth and finished fifth in the sprint for the Dutch Grand Prix. He qualified fourth again for the main race, before finishing sixth. At the Italian Grand Prix, he finished third in qualifying, but subsequently incurred a three-place grid penalty for impeding Liam Lawson, and finished fifth in the race. This was followed by an eighth-place finish at the Spanish Grand Prix, a thirteenth-place finish at the Azerbaijan Grand Prix, and a sixth-place finish at the Bahrain Grand Prix in Malaysia. Piastri retired from the Singapore Grand Prix sprint following a collision with Norris on the final lap, but was classified fourteenth. He then qualified seventh and finished fifth in the main race. This was followed by a seventh-place finish at both the United States Grand Prix and the Mexico City Grand Prix. However, he received a ten-second post-race time penalty in Mexico for causing a collision with Arvid Lindblad, as a result of which he was eventually classified thirteenth. He qualified twelfth and placed sixth at the São Paulo Grand Prix.

On 9 November 2026, it was announced that Piastri would no longer be managed by Mark Webber.

== Driver profile ==
=== Mentality ===
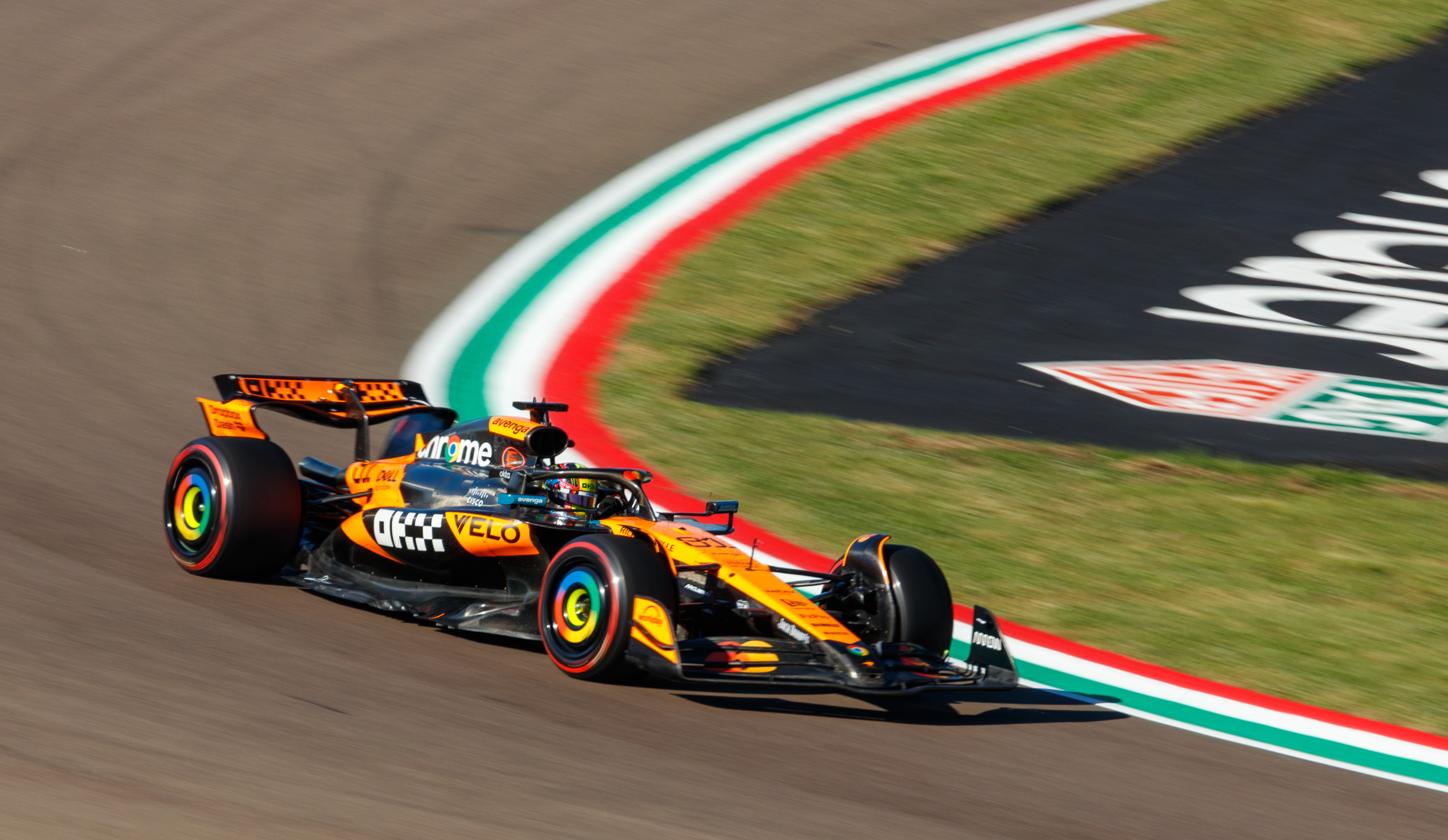
Piastri (pictured at the 2025 Emilia Romagna Grand Prix) has been acclaimed for his composure under pressure.

Piastri has been noted by drivers and critics for his composure under pressure. In 2023, Scott Mitchell-Malm of The Race compared his "relaxed intensity" to that of Max Verstappen. Upon winning the 2024 Azerbaijan Grand Prix, Luke Smith of The New York Times stated that "stress isn't an emotion one would associate with Piastri. His calm, collected demeanor has been present right from his junior days." This quality prompted several journalists to list him as a favourite for the 2025 World Drivers' Championship after the Bahrain Grand Prix, with Martin Brundle comparing him to Alain Prost. Andrew Benson of BBC Sport stated "combining consistent speed [with] mental solidity and racing decisiveness [makes him] a formidable rival". After winning the Saudi Arabian Grand Prix, title rival Verstappen stated "he's very calm in his approach, and I like that. [...] He delivers when he has to, barely makes mistakes—and that's what you need when you want to fight for a championship". As his title battle with teammate Lando Norris emerged, Natalie Pinkham of Top Gear described him as "the cerebral assassin", adding that "he races like he's solving a complex puzzle at [200 mph (320 km/h)]". His composed demeanour has drawn several comparisons to Kimi Räikkönen, widely known as the Iceman.

=== Development ===
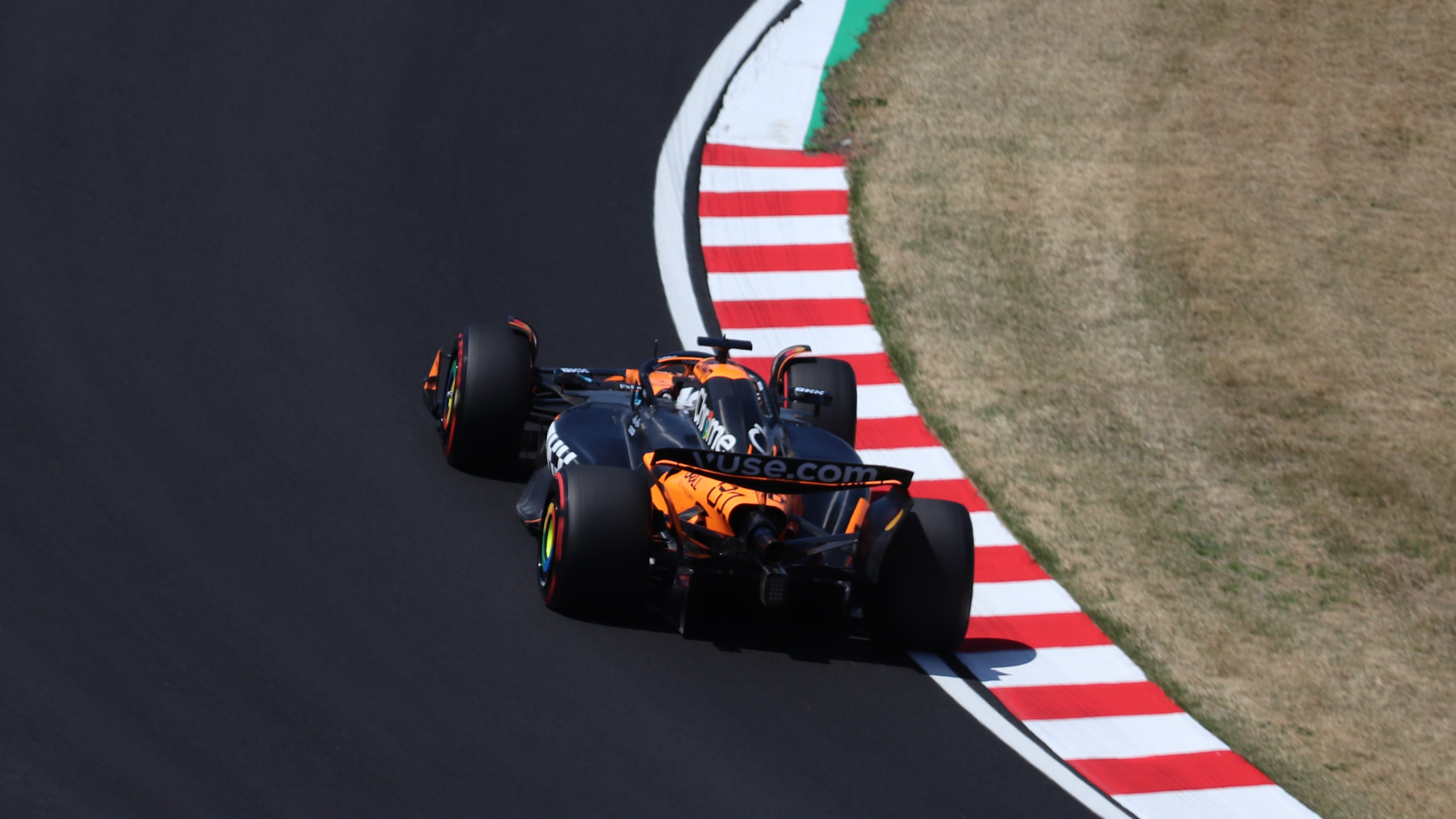
Piastri (pictured at the 2025 Japanese Grand Prix) has been noted for his development across his debut seasons.

Piastri has also been lauded for his adaptability, with race engineer Tom Stallard commending his ability to identify flaws in real-time and make improvements without data analysis. His ability to promptly learn from mistakes was initially noted by his engineer in the F4 UAE Championship. Sky Sports described his rookie campaign as "very impressive", noting that his tyre management required improvement. He was noted for his race pace development throughout 2024, as he took his maiden victories in Hungary and Azerbaijan—the latter was described by Luke Smith of The New York Times as a "coming-of-age drive". By 2025, several critics opined that he had eradicated the tyre management and qualifying pace issues he experienced in his earlier seasons; he worked closely with his engineers to solve the former and extensively analysed his past performances to iterate upon the latter.

== Personal life ==
Piastri with fans at the 2025 Australian Grand Prix

Outside of motor racing, Piastri is interested in video games—particularly Call of Duty—and cooking. He initially adopted the number 11 in kart racing before a rival started using it, prompting his switch to 81 in national competition, junior formulae, and as his personal driver number in Formula One. His racing helmet also originates from his karting career, utilising base colours of red and blue with fluorescent yellow details—modified from off-the-shelf designs—as well as the flag of Australia. He is a supporter of the Melbourne-based Australian rules football club Richmond. He also plays cricket, where he supports the Australia national team and the Delhi Capitals in the Indian Premier League—the latter after a social media post asking for recommendations of which team to support; he hosted the national team at the McLaren Technology Centre (MTC) following the 2025 ICC World Test Championship final.

Since 2018, Piastri has been in a relationship with his childhood sweetheart, Lily Zneimer, an engineering graduate he met while studying at his sixth form in England. During his early career, he lived in an apartment in proximity to the MTC in Woking, before moving to Monte Carlo in 2024.

== Awards and honours ==
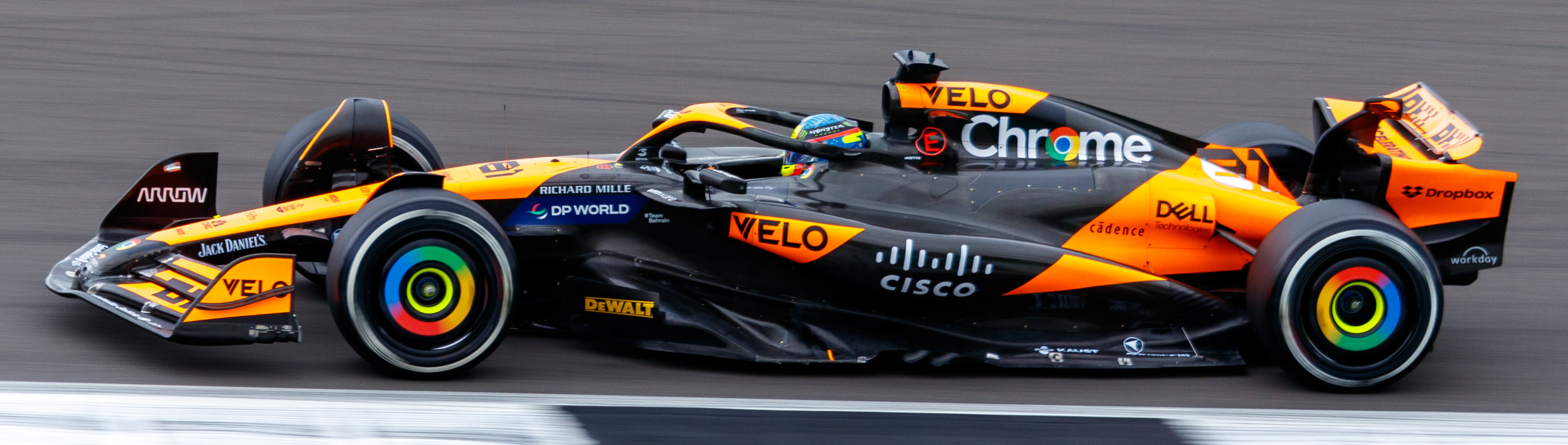
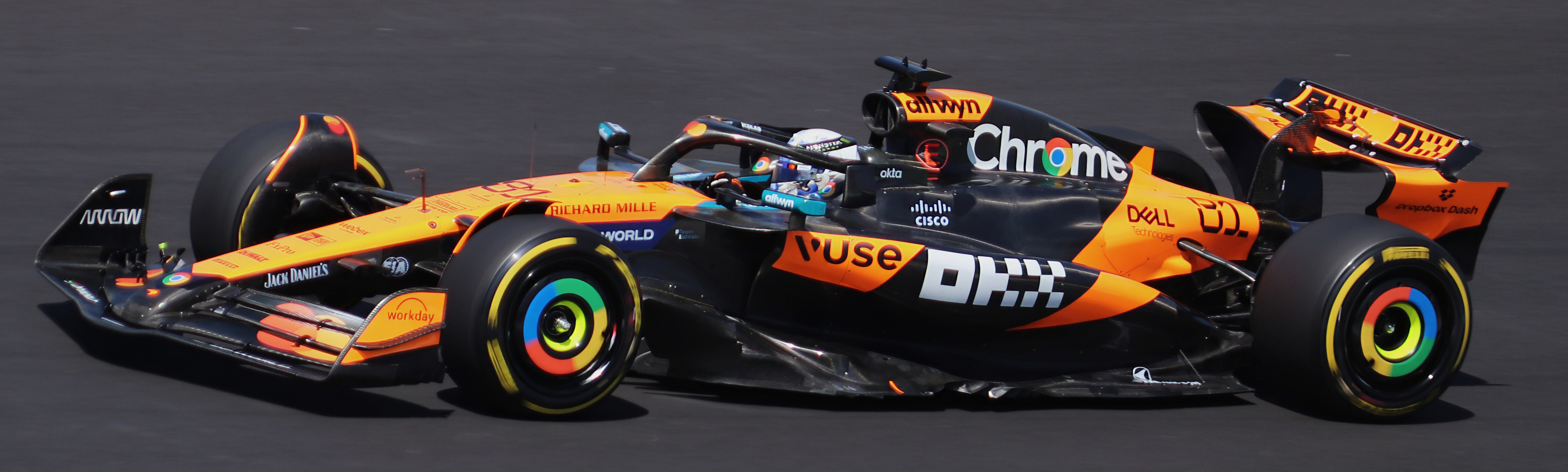
Piastri's Grand Prix–winning cars from top-to-bottom: MCL38 (2024) and MCL39 (2025)

=== Formula One ===
- FIA Rookie of the Year: 2023
- Lorenzo Bandini Trophy: 2025

=== Other awards ===
- Joe Tandy Memorial Trophy: 2017
- Autosport Awards Rookie of the Year: 2020, 2021, 2023
- Sir Jack Brabham Award: 2020, 2021, 2024
- FIA Rookie of the Year: 2021
- Anthoine Hubert Award: 2021
- Victorian Sports Awards Young Athlete of the Year: 2021
- Best Driver ESPY Award nominee: 2025
- The Don Award: 2025

== Karting record ==
=== Karting career summary ===
Season	Series	Team	Position
2013	CIK Stars of Karting — Rookies	Oakleigh Go Kart Racing Club	1st
2014	Australian Championship — Junior Clubman	Oakleigh Go Kart Racing Club	2nd
2014	OGKRC Championship — Junior Clubman	Oakleigh Go Kart Racing Club	1st
2014	City of Melbourne Titles — Junior Clubman	Oakleigh Go Kart Racing Club	1st
2014	South Australian Championship — Junior Clubman	Oakleigh Go Kart Racing Club	1st
2014	Victorian Championship — Junior Clubman	Oakleigh Go Kart Racing Club	2nd
2014	Champion of Champions — Junior Clubman	Oakleigh Go Kart Racing Club	1st
2014	Australian Championship — Junior National Light	Oakleigh Go Kart Racing Club	8th
2014	IAME International Final — X30 Junior		3rd
2015	Australian Championship — KF3	Oakleigh Go Kart Racing Club	3rd
2015	Victorian Championship — KF3	Oakleigh Go Kart Racing Club	1st
2015	Junior Top Guns — Junior Clubman	Oakleigh Go Kart Racing Club	1st
2015	Gold Coast Race of Stars — Junior Clubman	Oakleigh Go Kart Racing Club	1st
2015	City of Melbourne Titles — Junior Clubman	Oakleigh Go Kart Racing Club	1st
2015	WSK Super Master Series — KF-J	ASBL Karting Club Condroz	80th
2015	CIK-FIA European Championship — KF-J	Frank Cancelli	26th
2016	WSK Champions Cup — OK-J	Ricky Flynn Motorsport	29th
2016	South Garda Winter Cup — OK-J	Ricky Flynn Motorsport	10th
2016	WSK Super Master Series — OK-J	Ricky Flynn Motorsport	12th
2016	Deutsche Kart-Meisterschaft — OK-J	Ricky Flynn Motorsport	77th
2016	City of Melbourne Titles — KA3 Junior	Ricky Flynn Motorsport	1st
2016	CIK-FIA European Championship — OK-J	Ricky Flynn Motorsport	16th
2016	WSK Final Cup — OK-J	Ricky Flynn Motorsport	8th
2016	CIK-FIA World Championship — OK-J	Ricky Flynn Motorsport	6th
Source: (Note: Additional references are stated in § Karting (2011–2016).)

=== Complete CIK-FIA results ===
==== Complete CIK-FIA Karting World Championship results ====
Year	Entrant	Class	Circuit	QH	PF	F
2016	Ricky Flynn Motorsport	OK-J	(Bahrain) Sakhir	4th	18th	6th

==== Complete CIK-FIA Karting European Championship results ====
(key) (Races in bold indicate pole position; races in italics indicate fastest lap)

Year	Entrant	Class	1	2	3	4	5	6	7	8	9	10	11	12	Pos	Points
2015	Frank Cancelli	KF-J	POR; QH; 27	POR; F 12	PFI; QH; 42	PFI; F DNPQ	KRI; QH; 18	KRI; F DNQ							26th	4
2016	Ricky Flynn Motorsport	OK-J	ZUE; QH; 9	ZUE; PF; 39	ZUE; F DNQ	ADR; QH; 25	ADR; PF; 21	ADR; F 22	POR; QH; 2	POR; PF; 2	POR; F 9	GEN; QH; 55	GEN; PF; 29	GEN; F 28	16th	46

== Racing record ==
=== Racing career summary ===
Season	Series	Team	Races	Wins	Poles	F/Laps	Podiums	Points	Position
2016–17	Formula 4 UAE Championship	Dragon F4	11	0	0	0	2	94	6th
2017	F4 British Championship	TRS Arden Junior Team	30	6	6	5	15	376.5	2nd
2017	Formula Renault Northern European Cup	Arden Motorsport	2	0	0	0	0	26	21st
2018	Formula Renault Eurocup	Arden Motorsport	20	0	0	0	3	110	8th
2018	Formula Renault Northern European Cup	Arden Motorsport	8	0	0	0	3	—N/a	NC†
2019	Formula Renault Eurocup	R-ace GP	19	7	5	6	11	320	1st
2020	FIA Formula 3 Championship	Prema Racing	18	2	0	4	6	164	1st
2020	Formula One	Renault DP World F1 Team	Test driver						
2021	FIA Formula 2 Championship	Prema Racing	23	6	5	6	11	252.5	1st
2021	Formula One	Alpine F1 Team	Test driver						
2022	Formula One	BWT Alpine F1 Team	Reserve driver						
2022	Formula One	McLaren F1 Team	Reserve driver						
2023	Formula One	McLaren F1 Team	22	0	0	2	2	97	9th
2024	Formula One	McLaren F1 Team	24	2	0	1	8	292	4th
2025	Formula One	McLaren F1 Team	24	7	6	6	16	410	3rd
2026	Formula One	McLaren Mastercard F1 Team	20	0	0	0	2	152*	7th*

^{†} As Piastri was a guest driver, he was ineligible for championship points.
* Season still in progress.

=== Complete Formula 4 UAE Championship results ===
(key) (Races in bold indicate pole position; races in italics indicate fastest lap)

Year	Entrant	1	2	3	4	5	6	7	8	9	10	11	12	13	14	15	16	17	18	Pos	Points
2016–17	Dragon F4	DUB1; 1	DUB1; 2	DUB1; 3	YMC1; 1; 6	YMC1; 2; 5	YMC1; 3; 4	YMC1; 4; 5	DUB2; 1; 4	DUB2; 2; 4	DUB2; 3; 6	YMC2; 1; 3	YMC2; 2; 6	YMC2; 3; 3	YMC2; 4; 6	YMC3; 1	YMC3; 2	YMC3; 3	YMC3; 4	6th	94

=== Complete F4 British Championship results ===
(key) (Races in bold indicate pole position; races in italics indicate fastest lap)

Year	Entrant	1	2	3	4	5	6	7	8	9	10	11	12	13	14	15	16	17	18	19	20	21	22	23	24	25	26	27	28	29	30	31	Pos	Points
2017	TRS Arden Junior Team	BHI; 1; 3	BHI; 2; 6	BHI; 3; 2	DON; 1; 5	DON; 2; 5	DON; 3; 2	THR; 1; 7	THR; 2; 3	THR; 3; 6	OUL; 1; 6	OUL; 2; 1	OUL; 3 C	CRO; 1; 2	CRO; 2; 2	CRO; 3; 3	**SNE**; **1**; 1	SNE; 2; 7	**SNE**; **3**; 1	**KNO**; **1**; 1	KNO; 2; 6	KNO; 3; 8	**KNO**; **4**; 1	ROC; 1 Ret	ROC; 2; 10	ROC; 3 Ret	**SIL**; **1**; 3	SIL; 2; 3	**SIL**; **3**; 1	BHGP; 1; 4	BHGP; 2; 5	BHGP; 3; 5	2nd	376.5

=== Complete Formula Renault Northern European Cup results ===
(key) (Races in bold indicate pole position; races in italics indicate fastest lap)

Year	Entrant	1	2	3	4	5	6	7	8	9	10	11	12	Pos	Points
2017	Arden Motorsport	MNZ; 1	MNZ; 2	ASS; 1	ASS; 2	NÜR; 1	NÜR; 2	SPA; 1	SPA; 2	SPA; 3	HOC; 1; 8	HOC; 2; 8		21st	26
2018	Arden Motorsport	PAU; 1	PAU; 2	MNZ; 1	MNZ; 2	SPA; 1; 3	SPA; 2; 9	HUN; 1; 7	HUN; 2; 4	NÜR; 1; 15	NÜR; 2; 7	HOC; 1; 3	HOC; 2; 2	NC†	—

^{†} As Piastri was a guest driver, he was ineligible for championship points.

=== Complete Formula Renault Eurocup results ===
(key) (Races in bold indicate pole position; races in italics indicate fastest lap)

Year	Entrant	1	2	3	4	5	6	7	8	9	10	11	12	13	14	15	16	17	18	19	20	Pos	Points
2018	Arden Motorsport	LEC; 1; 6	LEC; 2; 5	MNZ; 1; 12	MNZ; 2 Ret	SIL; 1; 11	SIL; 2; 4	MON; 1; 13	MON; 2; 12	RBR; 1; 6	RBR; 2; 9	SPA; 1; 3	SPA; 2; 9	HUN; 1; 7	HUN; 2; 4	NÜR; 1; 15	NÜR; 2; 7	HOC; 1; 3	HOC; 2; 2	CAT; 1; 16	CAT; 2; 11	8th	110
2019	R-ace GP	MNZ; 1; 18	MNZ; 2; 4	**SIL**; **1**; 1	**SIL**; **2**; 1	MON; 1; 4	MON; 2; 5	LEC; 1; 2	LEC; 2; 6	SPA; 1; 1	SPA; 2; 4	**NÜR**; **1**; 1	**NÜR**; **2**; 1	HUN; 1 DNS	**HUN**; **2**; 1	CAT; 1; 5	CAT; 2; 3	HOC; 1; 2	HOC; 2; 2	YMC; 1; 1	YMC; 2; 4	1st	320

=== Complete FIA Formula 3 Championship results ===
(key) (Races in bold indicate pole position; races in italics indicate points for the fastest lap of the top-10 finishers)

Year	Entrant	1	2	3	4	5	6	7	8	9	10	11	12	13	14	15	16	17	18	Pos	Points
2020	Prema Racing	RBR; FEA; 1	RBR; SPR; 8	RBR; FEA; 4‡	RBR; SPR; 5	HUN; FEA; 2	HUN; SPR; 2	SIL; FEA; 2	SIL; SPR; Ret	SIL; FEA; 7	SIL; SPR; 6	CAT; FEA; 6	CAT; SPR; 1	SPA; FEA; 5	SPA; SPR; 6	MNZ; FEA; 3	MNZ; SPR; Ret	MUG; FEA; 11	MUG; SPR; 7	1st	164

^{‡} Half points awarded as less than 75% of race distance was completed.

=== Complete FIA Formula 2 Championship results ===
(key) (Races in bold indicate pole position; races in italics indicate points for the fastest lap of the top-10 finishers)

Year	Entrant	1	2	3	4	5	6	7	8	9	10	11	12	13	14	15	16	17	18	19	20	21	22	23	24	Pos	Points
2021	Prema Racing	BHR; SP1; 5	BHR; SP2; 1	BHR; FEA; 19†	MON; SP1; 8	MON; SP2; 2	MON; FEA; 2	BAK; SP1; Ret	BAK; SP2; 8	BAK; FEA; 2	SIL; SP1; 6	SIL; SP2; 4	**SIL**; **FEA**; 3	MNZ; SP1; 4	MNZ; SP2; 7	**MNZ**; **FEA**; 1	SOC; SP1; 9	SOC; SP2; C	**SOC**; **FEA**; 1	JED; SP1; 8	JED; SP2; 1	**JED**; **FEA**; 1‡	YMC; SP1; 3	YMC; SP2; Ret	**YMC**; **FEA**; 1	1st	252.5

^{†} Did not finish, but was classified as he had completed more than 90% of the race distance.
^{‡} Half points awarded as less than 75% of race distance was completed.

=== Complete Formula One results ===
(key) (Races in bold indicate pole position; races in italics indicate fastest lap; ^{superscript} indicates point-scoring sprint position)

Year	Entrant	Chassis	Engine	1	2	3	4	5	6	7	8	9	10	11	12	13	14	15	16	17	18	19	20	21	22	23	24	WDC	Points
2023	McLaren F1 Team	McLaren MCL60	Mercedes-AMG M14 E Performance 1.6 V6 t	BHR; Ret	SAU; 15	AUS; 8	AZE; 11	MIA; 19	MON; 10	ESP; 13	CAN; 11	AUT; 16	GBR; 4	HUN; 5	BEL; Ret^{2}	NED; 9	ITA; 12	SIN; 7	JPN; 3	QAT; 2^{1}	USA; Ret	MXC; 8	SAP; 14	LVG; 10	ABU; 6			9th	97
2024	McLaren F1 Team	McLaren MCL38	Mercedes-AMG M15 E Performance 1.6 V6 t	BHR; 8	SAU; 4	AUS; 4	JPN; 8	CHN; 8^{7}	MIA; 13^{6}	EMI; 4	MON; 2	CAN; 5	ESP; 7	AUT; 2^{2}	GBR; 4	HUN; 1	BEL; 2	NED; 4	ITA; 2	AZE; 1	SIN; 3	USA; 5	MXC; 8	SAP; 8^{2}	LVG; 7	QAT; 3^{1}	ABU; 10	4th	292
2025	McLaren F1 Team	McLaren MCL39	Mercedes-AMG M16 E Performance 1.6 V6 t	AUS; 9	**CHN**; 1^{2}	JPN; 3	**BHR**; 1	SAU; 1	MIA; 1^{2}	**EMI**; 3	MON; 3	**ESP**; 1	CAN; 4	AUT; 2	GBR; 2	BEL; 1^{2}	HUN; 2	**NED**; 1	ITA; 3	AZE; Ret	SIN; 4	USA; 5	MXC; 5	SAP; 5	LVG; DSQ	**QAT**; 2^{1}	ABU; 2	3rd	410
2026	McLaren Mastercard F1 Team	McLaren MCL40	Mercedes-AMG M17 E Performance 1.6 V6 t	AUS; DNS	CHN; DNS^{6}	JPN; 2	MIA; 3^{2}	CAN; 11^{4}	MON; 4	BCN; 5	AUT; 4	GBR; 11^{7}	BEL; 5	HUN; Ret	NED; 6^{5}	ITA; 5	ESP; 8	AZE; 13	BHR; 6	SIN; 5	USA; 7	MXC; 13	SAP; 6	LVG	QAT	ABU		7th*	152*

* Season still in progress.

== Notes ==
Sporting positions
Preceded by Max Fewtrell	Formula Renault Eurocup; Champion; 2019	Succeeded by Victor Martins
Preceded by Robert Shwartzman	FIA Formula 3 Championship; Champion; 2020	Succeeded by Dennis Hauger
Preceded by Mick Schumacher	FIA Formula 2 Championship; Champion; 2021	Succeeded by Felipe Drugovich
Awards
Preceded by Alex Albon	Autosport Awards; Rookie of the Year; 2020–2021	Succeeded by Zhou Guanyu
Preceded by Will Power (2018)	Sir Jack Brabham Award; 2020–2021, 2024	Succeeded by Incumbent
Preceded by Yuki Tsunoda	Anthoine Hubert Award; 2021	Succeeded by Ayumu Iwasa
Preceded by Yuki Tsunoda	FIA Rookie of the Year; 2021	Succeeded by Zane Maloney
Preceded by Zhou Guanyu	Autosport Awards; Rookie of the Year; 2023	Succeeded by Defunct
Preceded by Zane Maloney	FIA Rookie of the Year; 2023	Succeeded by Gabriel Bortoleto
Preceded by George Russell	Lorenzo Bandini Trophy; 2025	Succeeded by Incumbent
