= Formula One drivers from Australia =

- Drivers: 19
- Grands Prix: 808
- Entries: 945
- Starts: 914
- Best season finish: 1st (1959, 1960, 1966, 1980)
- Wins: 52
- Podiums: 158
- Pole positions: 41
- Fastest laps: 70
- Points: 3801.5
- First entry: 1952 Belgian Grand Prix
- First win: 1959 Monaco Grand Prix
- Latest win: 2025 Dutch Grand Prix
- Latest entry: 2026 São Paulo Grand Prix
- 2026 drivers: Oscar Piastri

There have been 19 Formula One drivers from Australia, of whom 16 have started at least one Grand Prix, and three never qualified for a race. Two Australian drivers have won the World Drivers' Championship: Jack Brabham, who won three titles in 1959, 1960 and 1966, and Alan Jones, who won one title in 1980 and remains Australia's most recent world champion.

== Current drivers ==
Oscar Piastri made his Formula One debut for McLaren at the 2023 Bahrain Grand Prix. He achieved his first podium at the 2023 Japanese Grand Prix, and his maiden victory at the 2024 Hungarian Grand Prix. At the 2025 Belgian Grand Prix, Piastri secured his sixth victory of the season, setting a new record for the most wins in a single Formula One season by an Australian driver. Simultaneously, Piastri also secured eight consecutive podiums in the early stages of 2025, the most consecutive podiums by an Australian driver, and the equal second most for a McLaren driver, matching the eight won by Ayrton Senna in 1988.

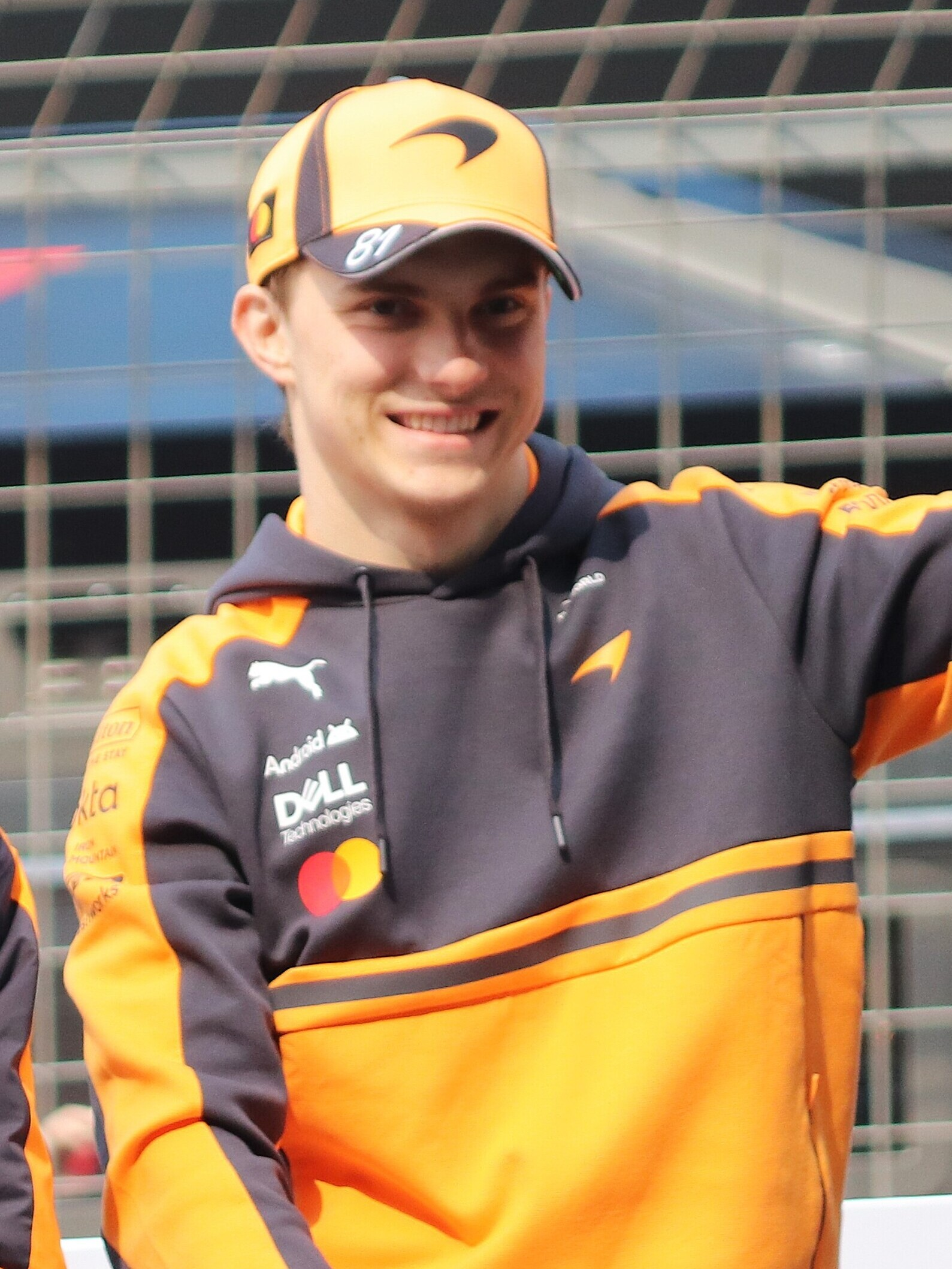
Oscar Piastri
2026 season position: 7th

== Former drivers ==
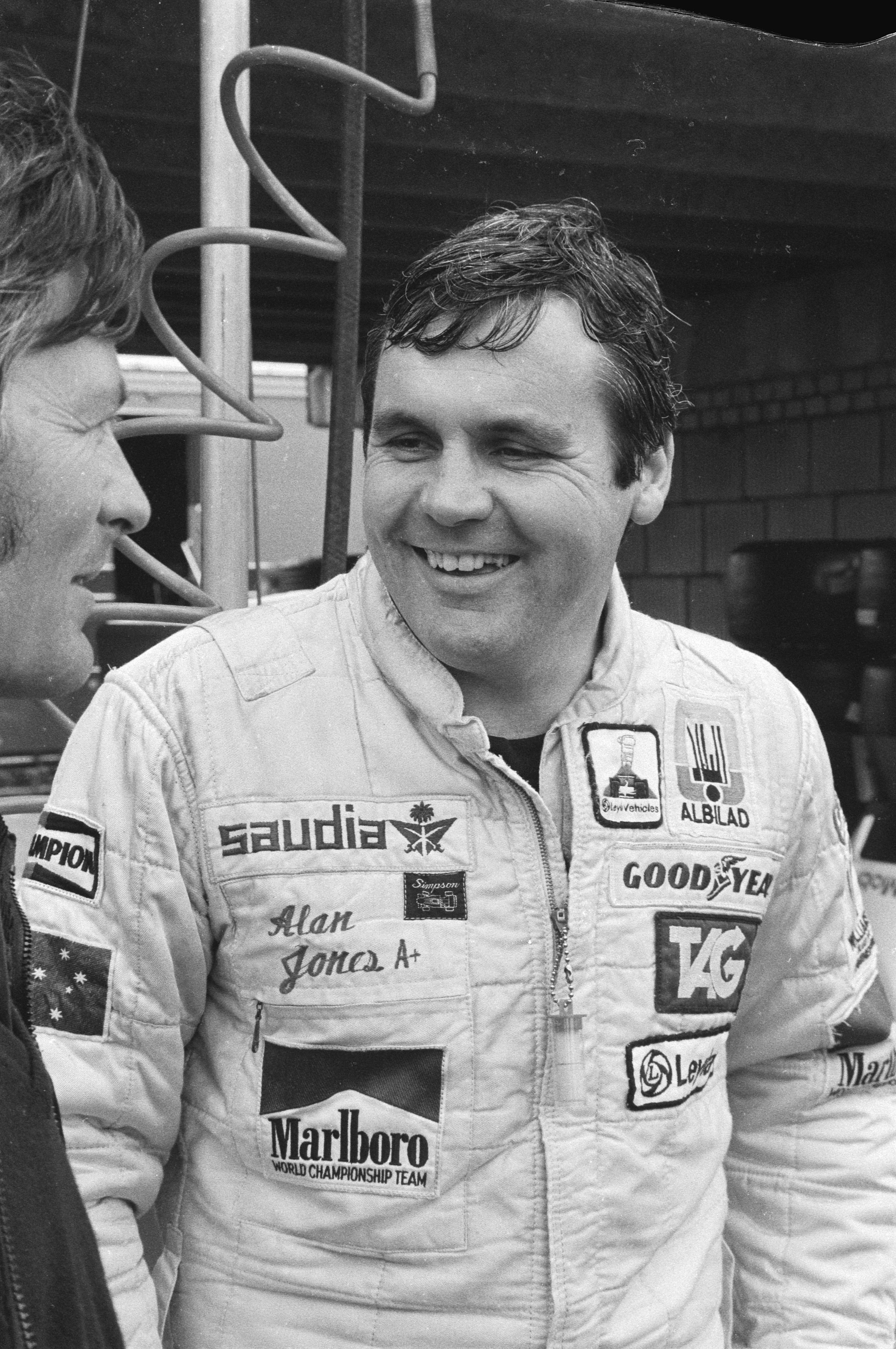
Alan Jones in 1980

Jack Brabham is the most successful Australian driver in history, having won three world titles. He entered one Grand Prix in each of the 1955 and 1956 seasons, eventually becoming a full-time driver with Cooper. He finished on the podium in five of eight races in 1959, including two victories. That brought him his first title, which he retained the following year by winning five successive races. Regulation changes in 1961 saw a shake-up of teams and Cooper did not adapt; Brabham only finished two races. His knowledge of mechanics gave him the opportunity to set up his own outfit from 1961, and Brabham would become a significant team in F1. History was made in 1966 when Jack Brabham became the first person to win the title in a car bearing their name.

Jack Brabham had three sons, two of whom went into Formula One. David Brabham took part in two seasons – 1990 with Brabham and 1994 with Simtek – but only finished seven races with a best result of 10th. Gary Brabham failed to qualify in two attempts during the 1990 season.

Alan Jones entered Formula One in 1975 when Graham Hill's team brought him in to replace the injured Rolf Stommelen. He impressed enough to secure a full-time drive with Surtees but was not retained for a second season. He instead signed to the Shadow team after the death of their driver Tom Pryce and secured his first win at the 1977 Austrian Grand Prix. In 1978 he joined Williams for their first season with a purpose-built chassis, finishing just over half the races and standing on the podium once. His second year with the team brought considerable success and Jones won four races on his way to third in the championship. He won the title in 1980, winning five races and featuring on the podium ten times, thereby becoming the first world champion for Williams. A difficult relationship with teammate Carlos Reutemann caused enough trouble within the team for Nelson Piquet to beat them both to the title in 1981 and Jones subsequently retired from Formula One. He made a one-off appearance for Arrows in 1983 but did not finish the race, then drove four races for Lola in 1985. He stayed with the team for the 1986 season but only finished five of the 16 races before retiring for good.

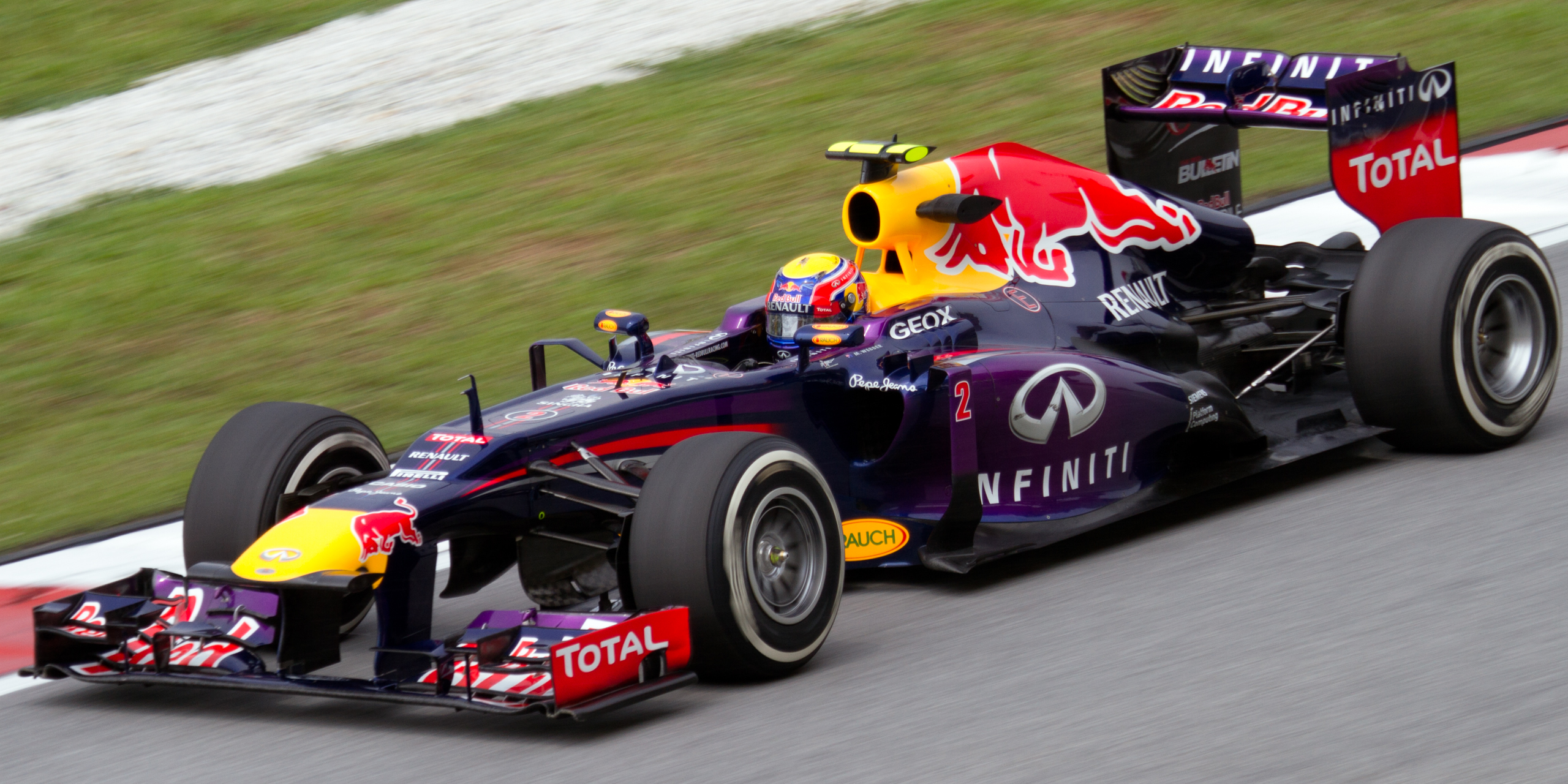
Webber driving for Red Bull at the 2013 Malaysian Grand Prix

Mark Webber three times finished third in the Drivers' Championship. He began his career with Minardi in 2002 before a two-year stint with Jaguar. Offered the choice of driving for Williams or Renault, Webber opted for the former, a team with many previous successes. Renault, however, produced a championship-winning car for the next two seasons as Fernando Alonso won the 2005 and 2006 Drivers' titles. Webber only managed to finish 10th and 14th in the championship and soon returned to his previous team, now running under the name Red Bull. In his third season with the team (2009) Webber scored his maiden race wins at Nürburgring and Interlagos. The following year he came close to winning the title, losing it after a poor pit stop in the final race pushed him down to eighth place with teammate Sebastian Vettel taking that year's honour. Webber remained with Red Bull for the next three years, finishing 3rd, 6th and 3rd in the championship.

Tim Schenken is one of only six Australian drivers to have stood on a podium step. His Formula One career began in 1970 when Frank Williams gave him a contract. He took part in four races for De Tomaso, leaving at the end of the season to join Brabham alongside Graham Hill. He achieved his only podium finish at the 1971 Austrian Grand Prix and left the team at the end of the year because of his concern about the management ability of new Brabham boss Bernie Ecclestone. However, his new drive with Surtees proved to be a bad move and he only managed to finish half of the twelve races he started. He was then unable to secure a full-time drive and only started eight races over the next two seasons for three teams.

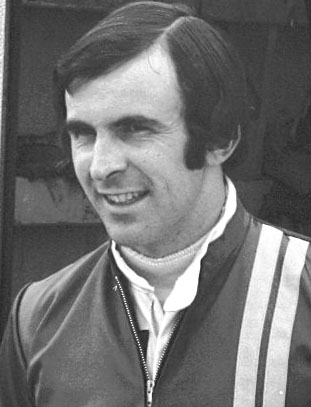
Tim Schenken in 1971

Tony Gaze was the first Australian driver to compete in Formula One. A former World War II pilot with a dozen aerial victories, Gaze is considered to have been amongst the country's greatest flying aces. He started three races in the 1952 but only finished one, coming in 14th.

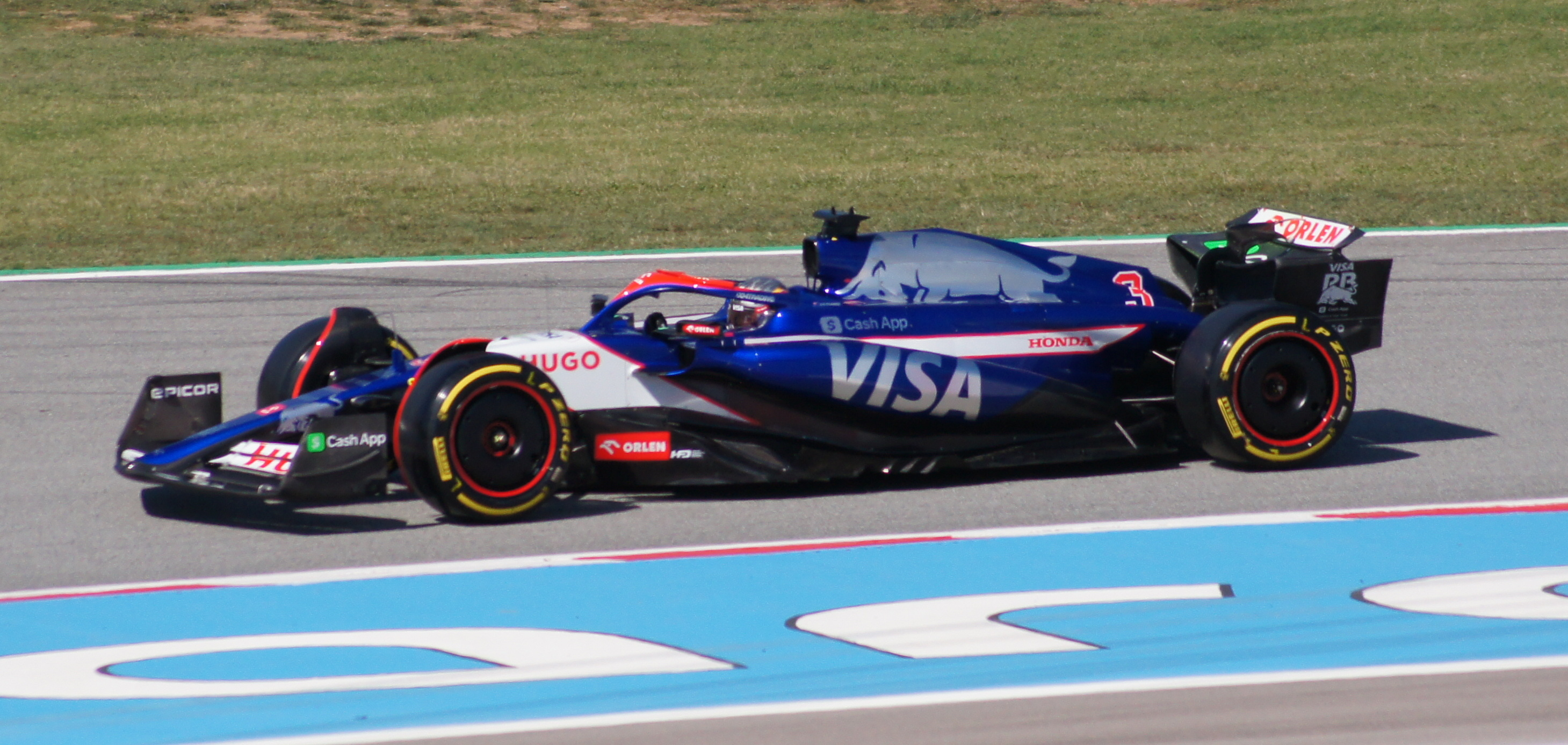
Ricciardo driving for RB at the 2024 Spanish Grand Prix

In 2011 Daniel Ricciardo became the first West Australian to race in Formula One. He had joined Red Bull in 2009 as a test driver and was promoted to reserve driver for the following year. He was loaned to HRT in the second half of the 2011 season and joined Toro Rosso as a full-time driver in 2012. After staying with Toro Rosso for 2013, Ricciardo moved to Red Bull Racing for 2014, where he stayed until the end of 2018, winning 7 races and achieving 29 podiums. He moved to Renault team for the 2019 season, and achieved 2 podiums with them at the 2020 Emilia Romagna and 2020 Eifel Grands Prix. From 2021 to 2022 he drove for McLaren, giving the team their first win in 9 years with his victory at the 2021 Italian Grand Prix. Although he had a contract to drive for the team in 2023, it was terminated during the 2022 championship by mutual agreement. For 2023, after initially acting as Red Bull Racing's third driver, he replaced Nyck de Vries at Scuderia AlphaTauri from the Hungarian Grand Prix onwards. He was replaced by Liam Lawson twice: first during an interim period after Ricciardo broke his hand following practice for the 2023 Dutch Grand Prix, and the second time from the 2024 United States Grand Prix onwards.

=== Other former drivers ===
Eight other drivers have competed in at least one race:

- Larry Perkins
- David Walker
- Vern Schuppan
- Frank Gardner
- Paul Hawkins
- Paul England
- Warwick Brown
- Jack Doohan

Two further drivers took part in at least one qualification session but did not start a race:

- Brian McGuire
- Ken Kavanagh

== Statistics ==
Drivers	Active Years	Entries	Wins	Podiums	Career Points	Poles	Fastest Laps	Championships
Tony Gaze	1952	4 (3 starts)	0	0	0	0	0	-
Jack Brabham	1955–1970	128 (126 starts)	14	31	253 (261)	13	12	3 (1959, 1960, 1966)
Paul England	1957	1	0	0	0	0	0	-
Ken Kavanagh	1958	2 (0 starts)	0	0	0	0	0	-
Frank Gardner	1964–1965, 1968	9 (8 starts)	0	0	0	0	0	-
Paul Hawkins	1965	3	0	0	0	0	0	-
Tim Schenken	1970–1974	36 (34 starts)	0	1	7	0	0	-
David Walker	1971–1972	11	0	0	0	0	0	-
Vern Schuppan	1972, 1974–1975, 1977	13 (9 starts)	0	0	0	0	0	-
Larry Perkins	1974, 1976–1977	15 (11 starts)	0	0	0	0	0	-
Alan Jones	1975–1981, 1983, 1985–1986	117 (116 starts)	12	24	199 (206)	6	13	1 (1980)
Warwick Brown	1976	1	0	0	0	0	0	-
Brian McGuire	1977	1 (0 starts)	0	0	0	0	0	-
Gary Brabham	1990	2 (0 starts)	0	0	0	0	0	-
David Brabham	1990, 1994	30 (24 starts)	0	0	0	0	0	-
Mark Webber	2002–2013	217 (215 starts)	9	42	1047.5	13	19	-
Daniel Ricciardo	2011–2024	258 (257 starts)	8	32	1329	3	17	-
Oscar Piastri	2023–2026	90 (88 starts)	9	28	951	6	9	-
Jack Doohan	2024–2025	7	0	0	0	0	0	-

== See also ==
- List of Formula One Grand Prix winners
