= McLaren MCL35 =

Formula One racing car, used in 2020 and 2021

McLaren MCL35 McLaren MCL35M
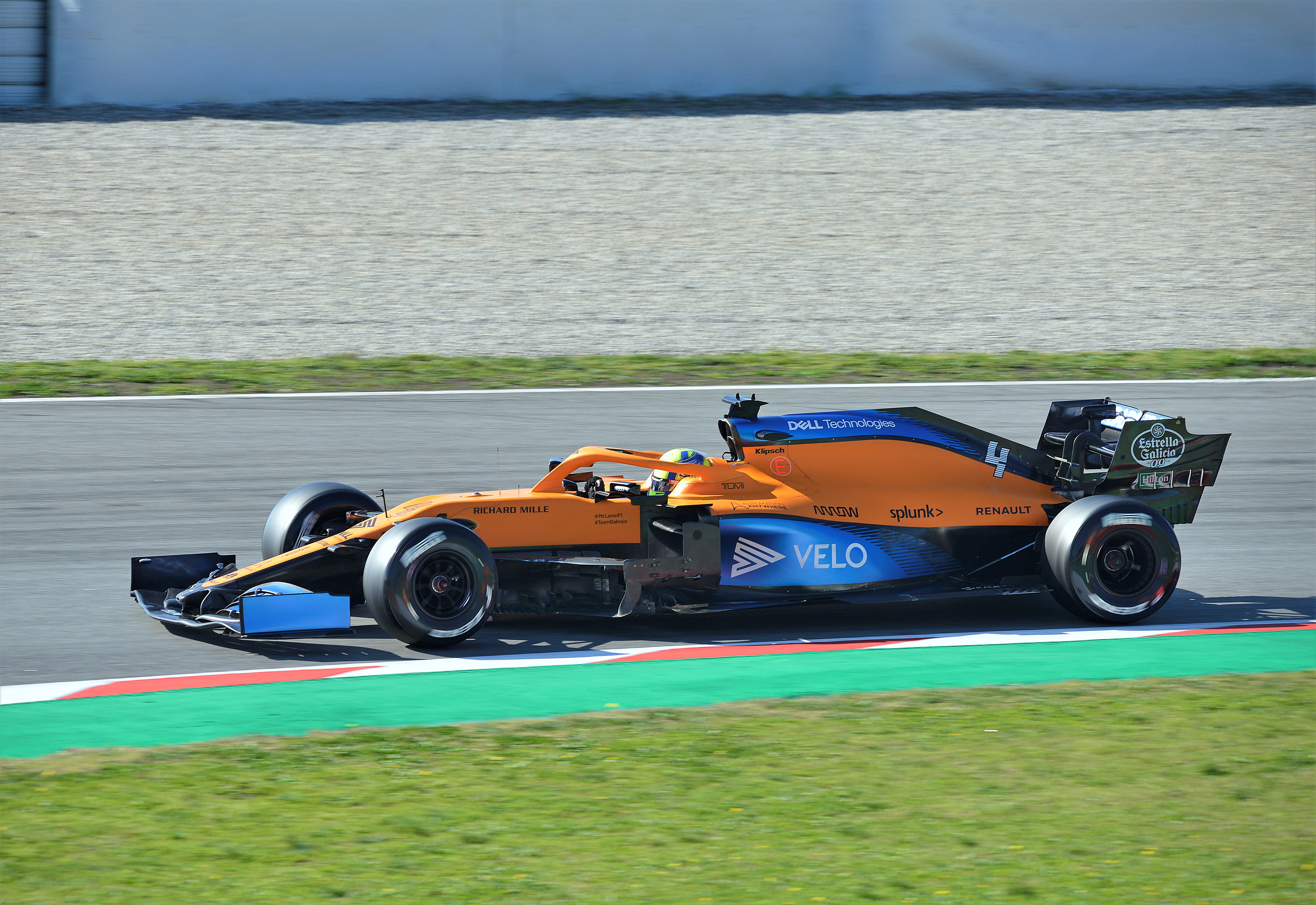
- An MCL35 driven by Lando Norris during 2020 pre-season testing.
- Category: Formula One
- Constructor: McLaren
- Designer: James Key (Technical Director)
- Predecessor: McLaren MCL34
- Successor: McLaren MCL36

Technical specifications
- Chassis: Carbon fibre composite with survival cell and honeycomb structure
- Suspension (front): Carbon fibre wishbone and pushrod suspension elements operating inboard torsion bar and damper system
- Suspension (rear): Carbon fibre wishbone and pullrod suspension elements operating inboard torsion bar and damper system
- Engine: 2020: Renault E-Tech 20; 2021: Mercedes-AMG F1 M12 E Performance 1.6 L (98 cu in) direct injection V6 turbocharged engine limited to 15,000 RPM in a mid-mounted, rear-wheel drive layout
- Electric motor: 2020: Renault; 2021: Mercedes-AMG Kinetic and thermal energy recovery systems
- Transmission: McLaren 8-speed + 1 reverse sequential seamless semi-automatic paddle shift with epicyclic differential and multi-plate limited slip clutch
- Battery: 2020: Renault; 2021: Mercedes-AMG Lithium-ion battery
- Weight: 2020: 746 kg 2021: 752 kg including driver, excluding fuel
- Brakes: Akebono carbon discs and pads
- Tyres: Pirelli P Zero (dry) and Pirelli Cinturato (intermediate and wet); Enkei 13" magnesium racing wheels
- Clutch: AP Racing electro-hydraulically operated, carbon multi-plate

Competition history
- Notable entrants: McLaren F1 Team
- Notable drivers: 3. (Australia) Daniel Ricciardo; 4. (United Kingdom) Lando Norris; 55. (Spain) Carlos Sainz Jr.
- Debut: 2020 Austrian Grand Prix
- First win: 2021 Italian Grand Prix
- Last win: 2021 Italian Grand Prix
- Last event: 2021 Abu Dhabi Grand Prix
Races	Wins	Podiums	Poles	F/Laps
39	1	7	1	5

The McLaren MCL35 is a Formula One car that was designed under the direction of James Key and constructed by McLaren to compete in the Formula One World Championship. The car was originally intended to compete in the 2020 season only, but as the championship was heavily disrupted by the COVID-19 pandemic, the lifespan of all 2020 cars was extended into 2021. McLaren produced an upgraded version of the car, the McLaren MCL35M, for the 2021 championship as the team returned to using Mercedes engines. Both variants of the car were considered competitive and the team's results improved considerably during the two seasons it was used in, with McLaren regularly the third-fastest team and significantly closer to the leading teams than had been the case since the turbo-hybrid era began in 2014.

The MCL35 represented a substantial development over its predecessor, the MCL34, featuring a new design that increased aerodynamic efficiency and was better optimized for Renault engines. The MCL35 made its début at the 2020 Austrian Grand Prix after the start of the season was delayed by the COVID-19 pandemic. It was driven by Carlos Sainz Jr. and Lando Norris. McLaren finished in third place in the World Constructors' Championship for the first time since 2012 and achieved podiums at the Austrian and Italian Grands Prix, while also claiming three fastest laps and setting a track record at the Red Bull Ring.

In 2021, the MCL35M was driven by Norris and Daniel Ricciardo. The updated car made its competitive début at the first race of the season, the 2021 Bahrain Grand Prix, and set two fastest laps, one pole position, and scored five podiums in total. The car took McLaren's first win since 2012 and first one-two finish since 2010 at the Italian Grand Prix. McLaren finished fourth in the Constructors' Championship, losing third place to Ferrari.

== Competition and development history of the MCL35 ==
=== Original design and development ===
James Key was recruited from Scuderia Toro Rosso in 2019 to replace the outgoing Tim Goss, and was the MCL35's lead designer. In October 2019 team principal Andreas Seidl stated very little of the MCL34 would be carried over to the MCL35, with the aim of reducing the overall pace deficit to the leading teams which at that point was still over a second. Lando Norris stated that one of the team's major areas of focus was to improve the MCL35's cornering capability.

Compared to the MCL34, the MCL35 design had a greater emphasis on the outwash effect – moving air around the tyre rather than over it – and a higher rear rake. The front wing also had increased outboard loading in order to maximize downforce. The MCL35 featured a thinner nose and a more complex bargeboard, with more space between the front axle and the sidepods to better meet the cooling requirements of the Renault engine. The car utilized a much slimmer sidepod profile, with re-designed brake ducts to increase cooling ability over its predecessor. Key explained that the suspension geometry of the MCL35 had been redesigned to incorporate developments the team had not been able to implement on the MCL34, which included the repositioning of both the upper and lower wishbone elements to influence airflow over the bargeboards and floor.

The success of both the MCL35 and the MCL35M have been in part credited to a change in design process from their predecessors, which emphasised the car as a whole and its performance relative to its competitors rather than the performance of individual components.

=== Livery ===
The MCL35 and its livery were originally unveiled in February 2020, featuring the McLaren corporate colour of papaya and blue. Prior to the first race of the season in Austria, McLaren revealed the addition of a rainbow graphic on the sidepod and halo in recognition of Formula One's #WeRaceAsOne campaign. The changes were interpreted by some as representing the LGBT+ rainbow flag, but McLaren stated the rainbow represented their support for diversity in general and provided recognition for essential workers rather than for any specific cause.

In contrast to the MCL34 and its glossy paintwork, the MCL35 was the first McLaren car to be wrapped with vinyl rather than painted, (Note: Certain areas of the bodywork, namely the halo and heat-sensitive areas, are still painted.) featuring a matte finish and greater use of black in order to lower the weight of the car and reduce the time required to prepare bodywork.

=== Engine supplier change and preparation for the MCL35M ===
Aside from minor upgrades, 2020-specification cars were meant to be kept largely unchanged for the 2021 season in order to limit the financial strain on teams that would be incurred by developing a new car under the already fragile financial conditions imposed by the COVID-19 pandemic. Since McLaren had already signed a contract to use Mercedes engines in 2021, they received special permission – subject to FIA inspection – to modify their chassis to accommodate the new engine. This requirement led directly to Formula One's adoption of a token-based system for 2021 vehicle development. Despite switching engine suppliers, McLaren did not switch gearboxes and continued to design and manufacture their own.

Key stated in November 2020 that the planning for the switch had gone smoothly, with the MCL35M to feature "a couple of changes to architecture [made] necessary by the shape of the engine compared to this year's. But it's not fundamentally different." However, Key also stated that the aerodynamic potential of the car could not be maximized due to the FIA's token system, leading McLaren to implement most chassis upgrades and some aerodynamic changes before the switch in the 2020 season. In a post-season statement, Key said that knowing the team would be restricted for development in 2021 "changed our approach when it came to developments this [2020] season."

=== 2020 season ===
==== Pre-season ====
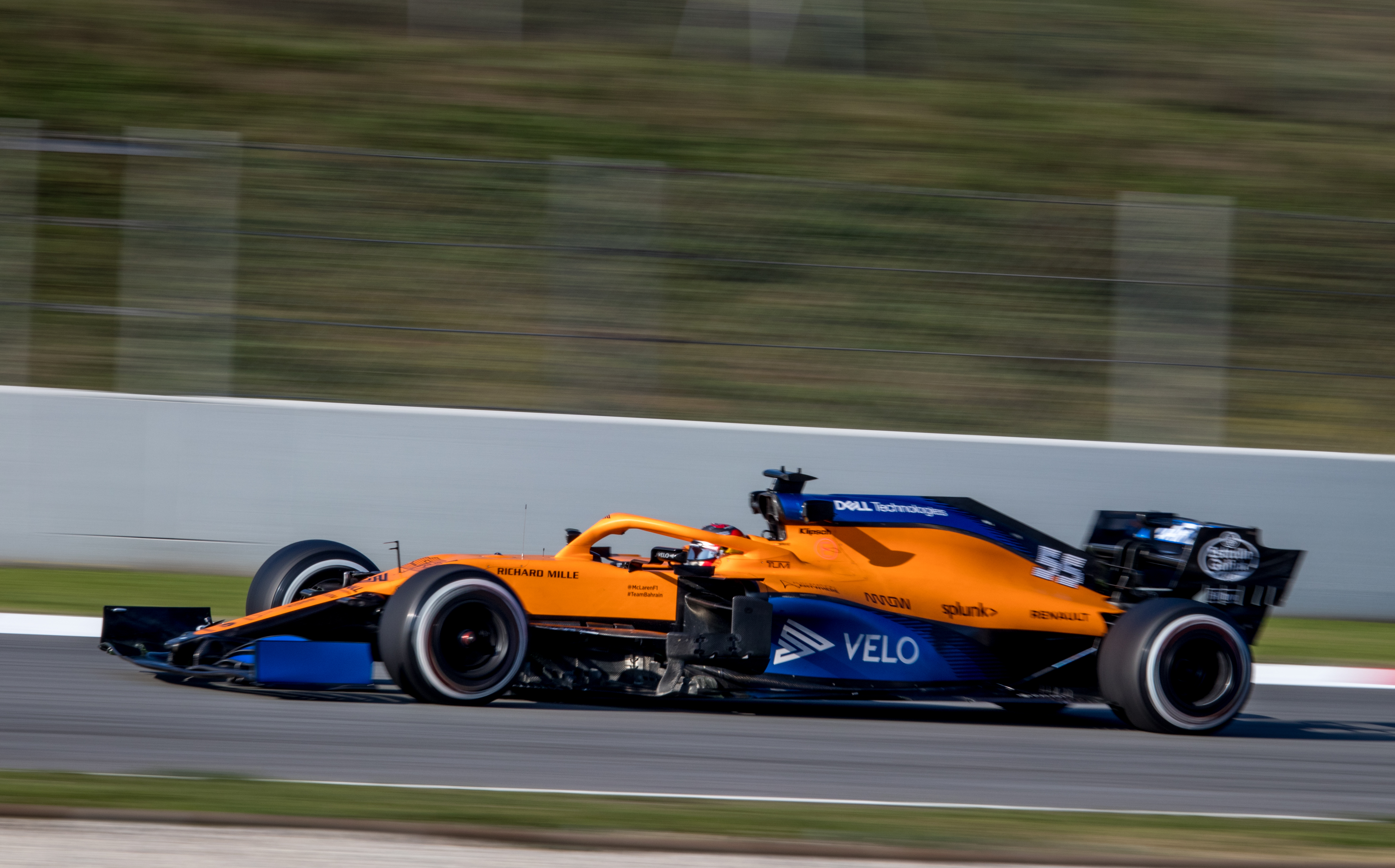
Sainz during pre-season testing.

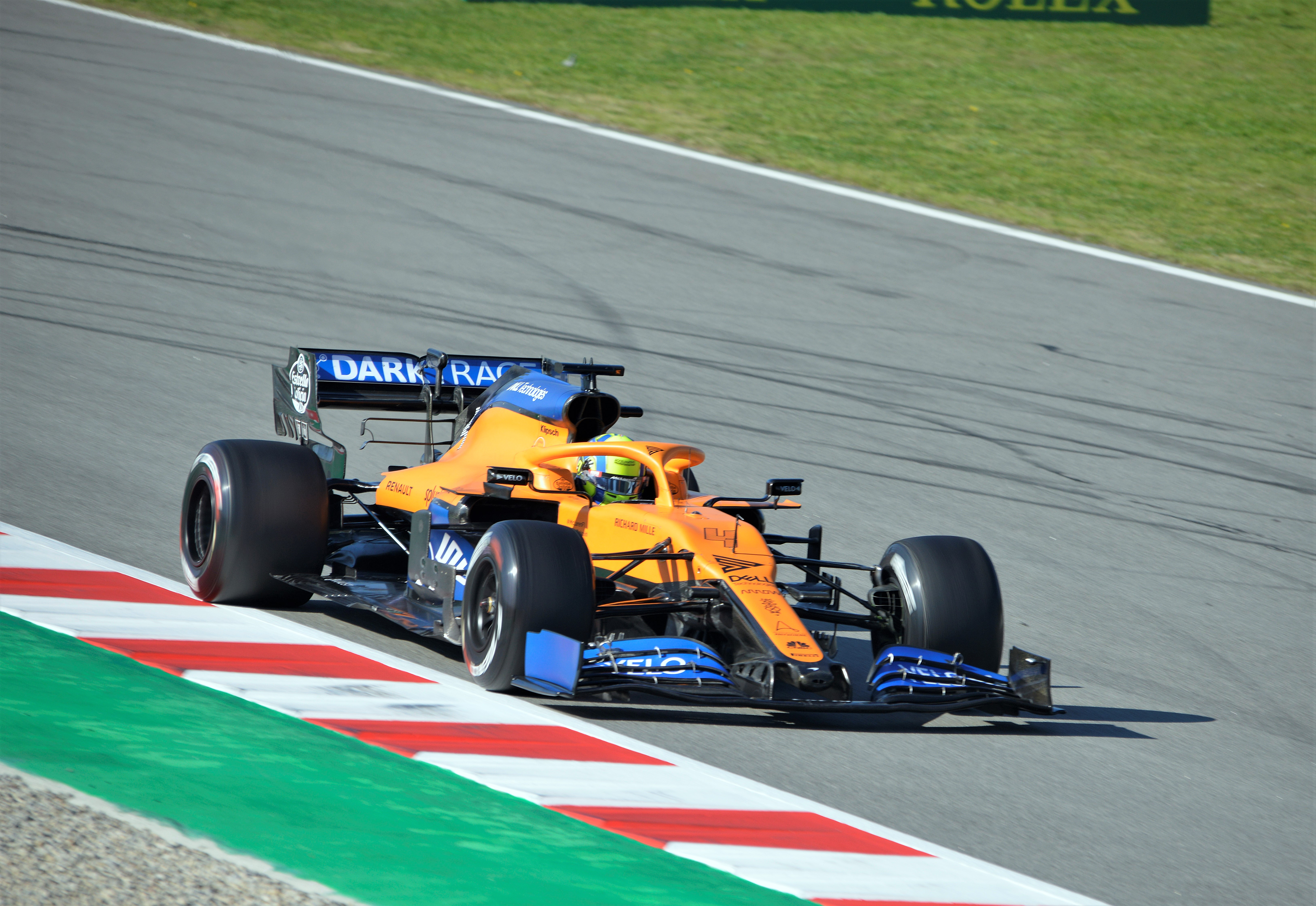
Norris during pre-season testing.

Prior to the beginning of the 2020 season, the team publicly established their aim to defend their status as 'best of the rest' – fourth place in the Constructors' Championship behind the then-leading trio of Mercedes, Ferrari and Red Bull – and close the gap to those respective teams. In pre-season testing however, Racing Point, whose car strongly resembled the 2019 Mercedes car, was very quick compared to the other midfield teams and caused McLaren to be less than optimistic about their chances to secure fourth place. Despite this, Sainz said that he was "shocked in a good way" by the MCL35's performance compared to its predecessor, and the team said they were happy with the car's pace. Key would later say that "we didn't really show our pace in winter testing."

After McLaren's withdrawal from the Australian Grand Prix and the race's subsequent cancellation, the season was heavily disrupted by the COVID-19 pandemic and the calendar was reorganized which delayed the car's début for several months. Prior to the opening round, Renault stated that they would not provide any upgrades to the E-Tech 20 engine. (Note: In comparison, both the Mercedes M11 and Honda RA620H received upgrades at the Austrian Grand Prix, while the Ferrari 065 did not receive any upgrades.) Therefore, the MCL35 used the same specification engine for the entire 2020 season.

==== Opening rounds and double-header events ====
McLaren used a new floor, diffuser, and brake ducts at the Austrian Grand Prix as well as a tweaked front wing. Sainz qualified eighth, while Norris qualified fourth and was promoted to third after a penalty was given to Lewis Hamilton, achieving McLaren's best grid start since the 2016 Austrian Grand Prix. After Norris lost positions in the opening laps to Hamilton and Alex Albon, both McLarens ran comfortably in the top ten for the remainder of the race. In the closing laps, Hamilton collided with Albon and was given a five-second penalty. On the final lap, Norris (then in fifth) overtook Sergio Pérez and set his first fastest lap to finish within five seconds of Hamilton, achieving his first Formula One podium. Sainz finished fifth after also overtaking Pérez. This was McLaren's second podium in three races after the 2019 Brazilian Grand Prix, in contrast to their previous gap of 118 races. The result placed McLaren second in the World Constructors' Championship (WCC) behind Mercedes, with Norris third and Sainz fifth in the World Drivers' Championship (WDC). In an article on strategy calls published in 2021, the team said the result was possible because of the "flawless" double-stacked pit stop allowing Norris to be in position to capitalize on Hamilton's penalty.

McLaren used a new chin spoiler design during the Styrian Grand Prix. Sainz qualified third, the best outright qualifying position for McLaren since 2014. Norris qualified sixth but was demoted to ninth due to a penalty from practice. Norris finished fifth after overtaking both Racing Point drivers on the final lap, while Sainz finished ninth and set the fastest lap and a new track record in the process, a record which still stood when that track format was last used for the 2024 Austrian Grand Prix. Sainz fell to seventh in the WDC.

McLaren used a new engine cover and T-wing (Note: A T-wing is a smaller, secondary wing which is attached to the rear engine cover to improve airflow to the rear wing and diffuser.) design during the Hungarian Grand Prix. Norris qualified eighth and Sainz ninth. Both drivers lost positions changing tyres on lap four, being held up by traffic in the pit lane. Norris finished thirteenth. Sainz finished tenth and was promoted to ninth after Haas driver Kevin Magnussen received a penalty. Norris fell to fourth and Sainz to ninth in the WDC, while the team was overtaken by Red Bull in the WCC.

At the British Grand Prix, McLaren removed the T-wing and reverted their engine cover design to the pre-Hungarian version, while using a new front wing, rear wing, and floor design. Norris and Sainz qualified fifth and seventh respectively, and by the closing laps ran seventh and fourth before a puncture for Sainz dropped him to fourteenth. He was promoted to thirteenth after Alfa Romeo driver Antonio Giovinazzi was penalized, while Norris finished fifth. Sainz fell to tenth in the WDC.

The following week at the 70th Anniversary Grand Prix, Norris qualified tenth and Sainz thirteenth, the latter being the first time a McLaren had failed to reach the final part of qualifying (Q3) in 2020. Sainz later said that the team had discovered an overheating issue in third practice, and in order to be able to complete the race the car had to undergo bodywork changes that compromised his qualifying pace. During the race, Sainz's pitstop was compromised by a wheel gun malfunction. Both drivers referenced tyre management as their main challenge, and Norris and Sainz finished ninth and thirteenth respectively. McLaren was overtaken by two points by Ferrari in the WCC and left the round in fourth place. Norris fell to fifth in the WDC and Sainz fell to eleventh.

==== Remaining European rounds ====
At the Spanish Grand Prix, Sainz's MCL35 continued to have cooling problems and he was given a new chassis. When this failed to solve the problem, the power unit on his car was replaced; McLaren later stated the issue was unrelated to the chassis. This was the first power unit change for an MCL35 and successfully fixed the issue. Sainz and Norris qualified seventh and eighth respectively, but were concerned about the impact of high temperatures during the race. Despite this, Sainz finished sixth and Norris tenth, meaning they respectively improved to ninth and fell to seventh in the WDC. Having scored 62 points already in the WCC, the team matched their 2018 total in six races.

McLaren installed a new rear wing and rear brake duct at the Belgian Grand Prix, as well as a new bargeboard. During practice, the team tested a new floor and diffuser compliant with 2021 regulations. (Note: The 2021 regulations mandated less aerodynamic parts and slimmer floor and diffuser construction compared to the previous year.) After qualifying, Sainz, who had qualified seventh, expressed concern at the possibility of a wet race, saying that the car was set up for lower downforce and that McLaren would be "in trouble" should it rain during the Grand Prix. He did not start because his Renault power unit had failed and destroyed the right exhaust bank before the race, resulting in the first non-finish for McLaren in 2020. Norris, who had qualified tenth, climbed three places to finish seventh. He improved to sixth in the WDC, and Sainz again fell to eleventh. McLaren recovered third place from Racing Point in the WCC.

The MCL35 was equipped with low downforce front and rear wings for the Italian Grand Prix. Norris missed the majority of the second practice session due to a sensor issue. The Italian Grand Prix was also the beginning of an FIA ban on qualifying engine modes. Sainz qualified third and Norris sixth. Both drivers overtook others on the first lap to end the first lap second and third respectively, and held position until the first safety car of the race. After yellow and red flags caused by incidents for Magnussen and Leclerc, Sainz restarted the race seventh and Norris eighth. Norris finished fourth while Sainz attempted to catch race leader Pierre Gasly, reducing the gap to 0.415 seconds by the final lap. This was Sainz's second career podium and McLaren's second podium of the season. Seidl stated that McLaren had been the second-quickest team behind Mercedes and that the team would have finished second and third had the race been less chaotic. Sainz credited the red flag for his second place, saying that without the tyre change advantage it gave to those ahead of him after the safety car he would have been able to claim first. AlphaTauri team principal Franz Tost later said that Gasly's advantage through the second sector which allowed him to hold off Sainz was down to the AlphaTauri team's decision to run a higher downforce on their AT01. Norris also claimed that the red flag and the advantage it gave to Stroll was the reason he could not reclaim third place. The race resulted in McLaren's best finish since 2014, and increased their lead for third place in the WCC, while Norris took fifth and Sainz ninth in the WDC. In an article on strategy published in 2021, McLaren said the team "could have won [...] had we not pitted under the Safety Car and instead changed tyres when the race was brought to temporary halt by a red flag" but Director of Sporting and Strategy Randy Singh said the team "made the right call" at the time.

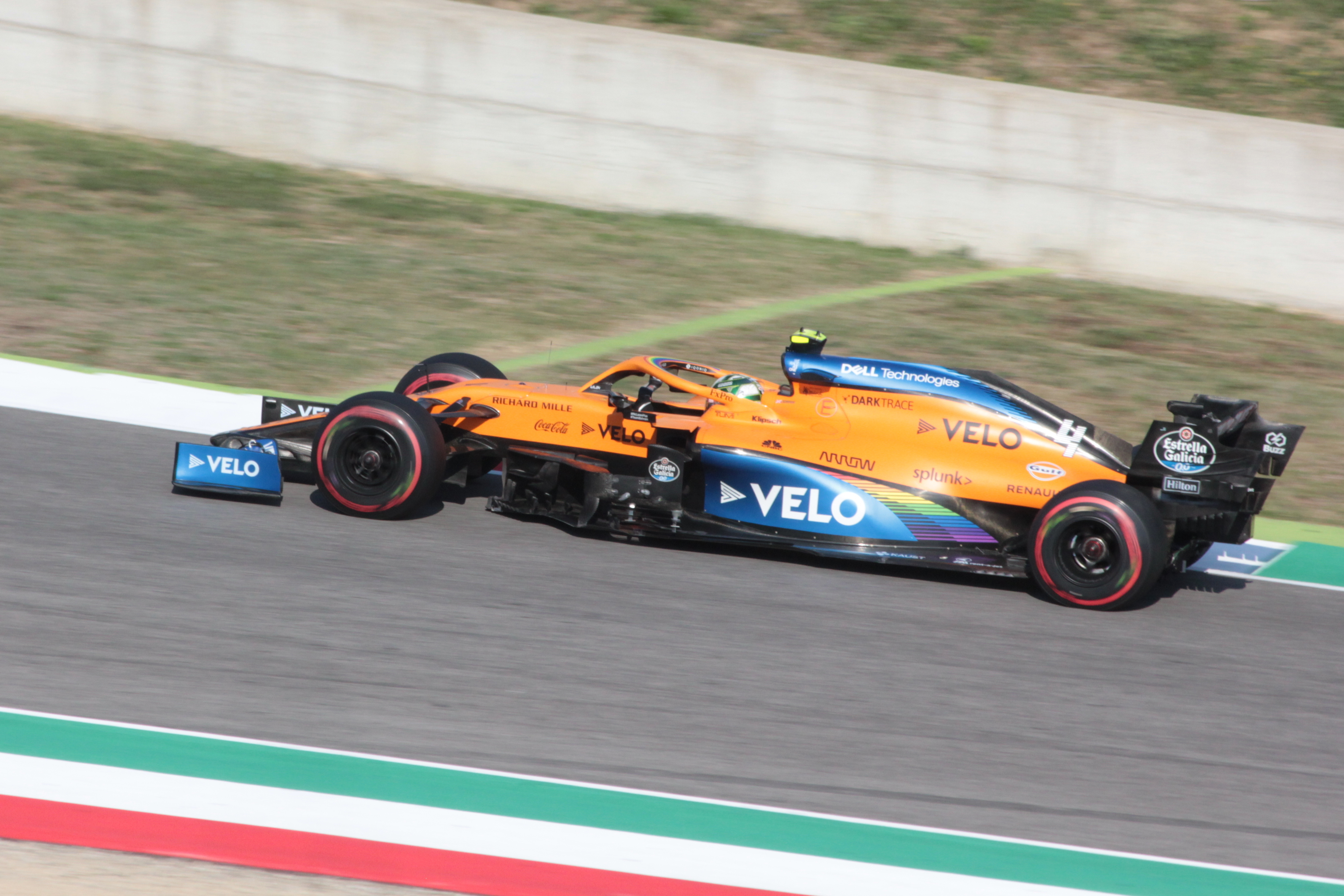
Norris during the Tuscan Grand Prix

During the first practice session of the Tuscan Grand Prix, McLaren tested a new nose intended to be raced later in the season for it to be applied to the 2021 chassis. After the second practice session, Sainz commented that the car lacked rear stability, but its "performance can improve considerably" with the right changes. He qualified ninth and Norris eleventh, the first time in 2020 the latter had not made it to Q3. Both drivers said that the MCL35 was highly sensitive to wind, particularly tailwinds, but were happy with the performance of the car compared to the practice sessions. During the race, Stroll collided with Sainz on the opening lap causing him to spin. Sainz was then hit by Sebastian Vettel who could not take evasive action, but unlike Vettel, Sainz's car was undamaged. After the safety car restart Sainz was involved in an accordion effect crash with Antonio Giovinazzi's Alfa Romeo, the Williams of Nicholas Latifi, and Magnussen which triggered the first red flag of the race. Sainz became the first McLaren race retirement of the 2020 season; Norris finished the race sixth and took fourth in the WDC as his teammate fell to eleventh. At the conclusion of this race McLaren had scored in excess of 100 points in nine Grands Prix, much quicker than the 16 races it took in 2019. After the race Piers Thynne, McLaren's production director, stated that the team had "lost significant parts" in the race.

At the Russian Grand Prix, McLaren ran the MCL35 with a new front wing, and continued to test the new nose design introduced at the previous race. Sainz returned to the chassis he had used up until the Spanish Grand Prix after the restart incident at the Tuscan Grand Prix. He and Norris qualified sixth and eighth respectively. When questioned about his drop from third in practice three to sixth in qualifying, Sainz explained that the team had again had issues with the MCL35's wind sensitivity. Seidl also stated that the new nose was "not a step forward really" but that the team was "quite restricted at the moment, with the number of parts" after the incident at the previous race and an accident Sainz had in practice; the new nose would form part of a future upgrade package introduced at the following race. Both McLarens had poor starts from the dirty side of the grid. At turn two, Sainz ran off the track and "misjudged [his] entry speed around the bollard" trying to re-join the track, colliding with the wall and retiring from the race. Norris was forced to run over debris from Sainz's car, causing a steering issue that compromised his performance for the rest of the race. Norris pitted during the safety car period, but his hard tyres did not last the entire race distance as hoped; forcing him to pit again and dropping him out of the points. McLaren stated this was done since Norris was already likely to drop out of the points on the ageing tyres, and was thus intended to take the fastest lap point away from other teams. This was McLaren's first pointless race since the 2019 Mexican Grand Prix, ending a 12 race point-scoring streak and was the team's only pointless race in 2020.

McLaren announced ahead of the Eifel Grand Prix that the rest of the aerodynamic upgrade would be installed on the car at that race. It was later clarified only Sainz would run the new package, a decision made because the cancellation of practice one and two limited opportunities to compare the old and new packages. Norris qualified eighth and Sainz, who said he was unhappy with the upgrade package, tenth. McLaren credited Sainz's difficulties to the cancellation of the first two practice sessions, saying the package had not been properly set up for the track. Despite installing a new power unit overnight, Norris ran in third place before an issue arose with his Renault power unit and dropped several positions until he was forced to retire, triggering a safety car. Sainz finished fifth. McLaren lost third in the WCC to Racing Point, and Norris fell to sixth in the WDC.

The team continued to develop the new aerodynamics package at the Portuguese Grand Prix. The team opted to run the MCL35 with the new nose box, delaying the rest of the package to future races. Despite further issues with wind sensitivity in qualifying, Sainz qualified seventh and Norris eighth. Both McLarens gained places on the opening lap, with Sainz taking the lead from laps two through to five and Norris moving up to fourth. This early advantage was partially attributed to the speed at which the MCL35 brought the soft tyres into the operating window. However, both McLarens began to lose positions as the medium tyre came into its operating window and the drag reduction system was enabled. Stroll attempted to overtake Norris in to turn one, but turned in on him on the apex of the corner, causing damage to both cars and dropping Norris to second-last after pitting. Sainz struggled with tyre graining but finished sixth, with Norris finishing thirteenth. Sainz improved to tenth and Norris fell to seventh in the WDC.

Norris and Sainz qualified ninth and tenth respectively at the Emilia Romagna Grand Prix. Sainz finished seventh and Norris eighth, with Sainz saying the evasive action required after Albon spun in front of him prevented him from attacking during the final laps. McLaren drew level with Racing Point in the WCC, but both were overtaken by Renault. Sainz improved to eighth in the WDC. Seidl said that the team's race was limited by their qualifying position, while Norris said that the team still had competitive pace but were on a run of bad luck.

==== Closing rounds ====
Several components on the MCL35 were redesigned to account for the high-load nature of the Turkish Grand Prix. Sainz suffered an issue with his power unit's electronics in the first practice session, triggering a virtual safety car and causing him to miss most of the session. Norris and Sainz originally qualified eleventh and thirteenth respectively. However, Norris was given a five-place grid penalty for breaking yellow flag conditions, with stewards stating "Car 4 was not attempting to set a quick lap time, due to the changing track conditions he nevertheless did so and thereby breached the referenced regulations." Sainz was given a three-place grid penalty for impeding Pérez, which Sainz said was due to the weather conditions. Recovering to fifth in the race, he took seventh in the championship from his teammate who finished eighth and set the fastest lap of the race. The result meant that the team exceeded their 2019 total of 145 points over 21 races, having scored 149 points in 14 races.

McLaren spent a portion of practice at the Bahrain Grand Prix continuing tests with their 2021 floor and diffuser. Norris stated he was lacking confidence with the car, saying "I didn't feel the most confident throughout today [...] Just because it's quite tricky with the wind, even though it's not very windy." During the second part of qualifying (Q2), Sainz's rear axle locked as his rear brakes failed, ending his qualifying session early and limiting his choice of tyre compounds for the race. Norris qualified ninth and Sainz fifteenth. Norris finished fourth in the race and Sainz fifth, allowing the Norris to reclaim seventh in the WDC from his teammate. The result combined with the retirement of both Racing Point cars meant McLaren re-took third in the WCC by 17 points.

Sainz predicted ahead of the Sakhir Grand Prix that choosing the correct setup – particularly downforce levels – would be challenging because of the circuit's lengthy straights. McLaren ultimately ran the MCL35 with a lower downforce aerodynamics kit, featuring a "spoon-shaped" rear wing. During the second practice session, Sainz experienced an issue with his gearbox that interrupted his running. Norris damaged the floor of his MCL35 on a kerb and then experienced power issues. Both drivers expressed surprise at their apparent loss of pace from the previous week. Sainz qualified eighth, which he said was "the maximum our car could do", while Norris qualified fifteenth which he attributed to poor out-lap timing and an error. Norris was required to start nineteenth after replacing his internal combustion engine and turbocharger, exceeding his component limits. In the race, Sainz had a good start and was in third by the end of the first lap, and briefly challenged Valtteri Bottas of Mercedes for second place. However, shortly after Sainz's second pitstop, a safety car gave rivals who passed him after his pitstop a tyre advantage. At the restart, Sainz overtook Bottas to take fourth place. Norris recovered to finish tenth after being passed by George Russell's Mercedes on the last lap, and said that he lacked the pace to challenge for higher positions, which he attributed to the MCL35's struggle with dirty air. McLaren dropped to fourth in the WCC after Racing Point finished first and third, while Sainz took seventh and Albon overtook Norris for eighth in the WDC.

Norris qualified fourth and Sainz sixth for the Abu Dhabi Grand Prix. Norris said he was surprised by the small difference between himself and polesitter Verstappen, which was only 0.251 seconds, calling it his best lap of the year. Norris finished fifth and Sainz sixth, scoring enough points to take third place in the WCC, McLaren's best finish since the 2012 season. Sainz took sixth in the WDC, while Norris finished the season ninth. The team later called the race "quite possibly our smoothest" of the year in terms of strategy.

McLaren did not participate in the post-season young drivers' test, making the Abu Dhabi Grand Prix the final outing for the MCL35.

=== Assessment and characteristics ===
Although taking third in the WCC, the MCL35 was rarely the third fastest car on pure pace and was usually outperformed by the Racing Point RP20 and often the Renault R.S.20. Lawrence Barretto summarised the car as "lack[ing] downforce, lack[ing] low speed balance and [not] a fan of a tailwind", but also said that "the overall package was better, with a key strength lying in the high-speed corners", and pointed to Sainz's opening lap performance in Portugal as evidence of the MCL35's capability in cold conditions. McLaren later labelled the car's wind sensitivity "the MCL35's Achilles' heel." Overall, the majority of McLaren's retirements in 2020 were not due to the chassis or driver error; usually retirements were due to incidents caused by other drivers or issues with the Renault E-Tech 20 engine.

Journalist David Tremayne described the MCL35 as "a consistent points scorer", a characteristic that enabled McLaren to remain competitive in seeking third place in the Constructors' Championship. Barretto made a similar assessment, saying that the MCL35 allowed its drivers "to get the very best out of it more consistently – something Renault or Racing Point could not replicate."

In a reflection on the 2020 season, McLaren Sporting Director Andrea Stella said that the car's performance early in the season allowed the team to be "very competitive and at the front of the midfield" but this advantage was not retained over the second half of the season. Key said "Certain tracks and conditions, particularly in the latter part of the season, have not played to our strengths." Comparing the MCL35 to the MCL34, Key said the team had been "only around 50% successful in addressing the [MCL34's] weak spots" but "there's nothing fundamental about the car that is preventing us doing that [improving the car]. It's predominantly aero-related, with some set-up aspects."

== Competition and development history of the MCL35M ==
=== Development from the MCL35 to the MCL35M ===
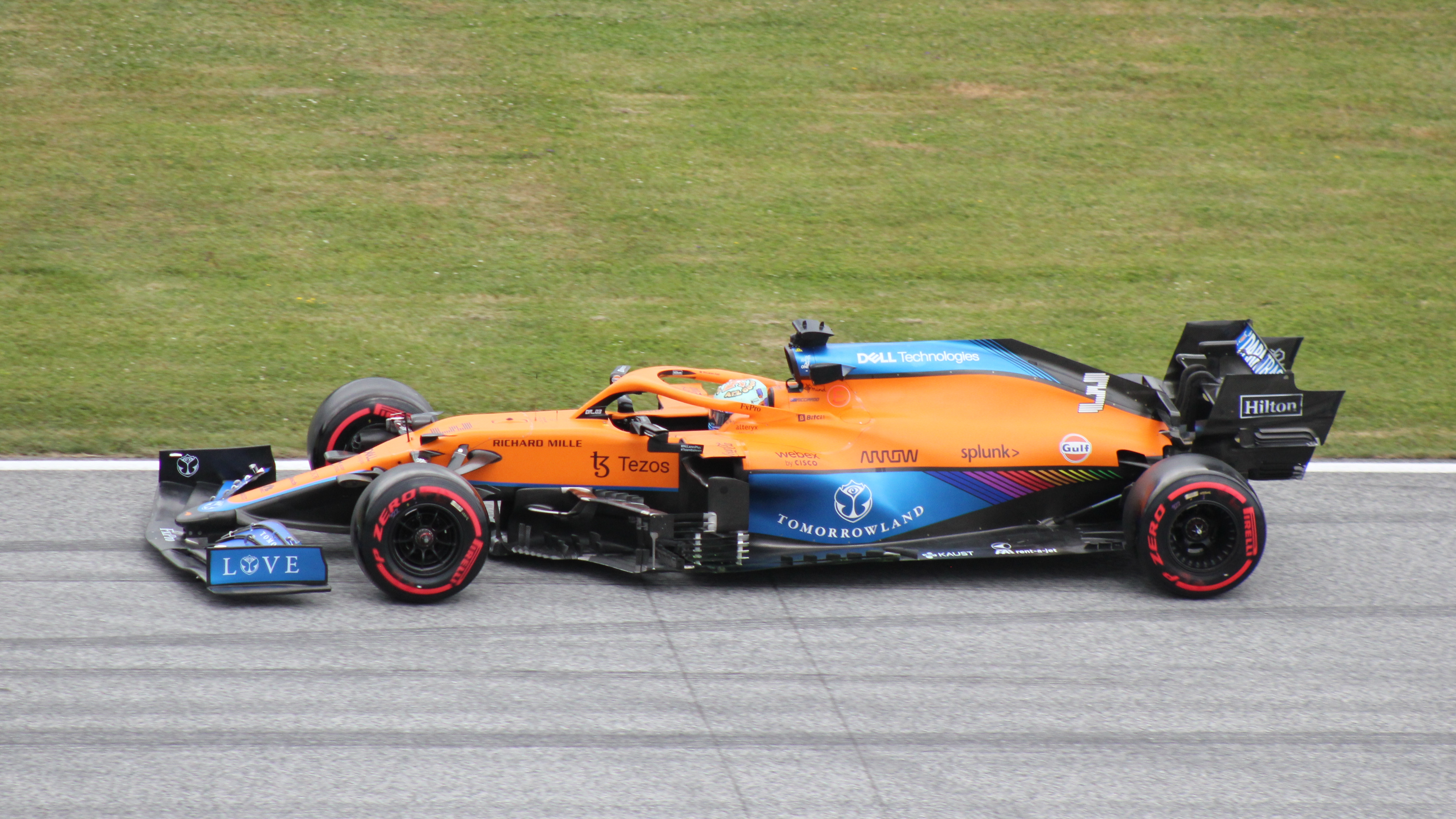
Ricciardo during practice for the Austrian Grand Prix

Due to the restrictions imposed by the FIA's token system for 2021 development, most of the aerodynamic changes for the MCL35M were introduced in the 2020 season. McLaren "substantially re-engineer[ed] some areas" of the MCL35 to adapt to 2021 regulations that reduce the overall downforce of the car, while the switch to the Mercedes power unit necessitated the redesign of hydraulics, cooling, electronics, pipework for air and fluids, and control boxes. These changes were driven by the different layout of the M12 over the E-Tech 20, since the Mercedes engine's turbine and compressor are in different locations: the E-Tech 20 had both the turbine and compressor at the rear of the engine, while the M12 places the compressor at the front and turbine at the rear to allow for a larger and more efficient power unit. The MCL35M also saw the introduction of a new gearbox, which McLaren continued to develop independently. This new gearbox necessitated the extension of the car's wheelbase. Key described the MCL35M as "akin to a new car".

Key identified two target areas for improvement with the MCL35M: low-speed cornering performance and wind sensitivity, two areas in which the MCL35 struggled. Production Director Piers Thynne said that "The number of new parts on the MCL35M is about the same as when we built the MCL35," meaning "essentially, we've been building a new car." However, gearbox internals were not changed, nor were some suspension components as these were allowed to be carried over from 2020 outside of the 2021 budget cap. The rear end of the chassis and the gearbox housing were changed significantly, hence McLaren was the only team required to re-homologate their chassis due to the changes in car architecture. The MCL35M passed FIA crash tests in December 2020. The air intake of the MCL35M was significantly changed from the MCL35's, becoming a more conventional design similar to that seen on the Mercedes vehicles. The sidepods also adopted a more sloping design in order to dump air onto the floor and into the diffuser to create more downforce and counter the effects of the 2021 technical regulations which were intended to reduce downforce.

The MCL35M's diffuser was a point of discussion during pre-season testing, since the car appeared to have diffuser strakes significantly longer than permitted under the 2021 rules. By attaching the inboard strakes to the floor of the car, the team could effectively run a larger diffuser. Key said he was surprised no other team had implemented the workaround, but characterized it as part of a larger aerodynamic concept and did not expect it to be copied or a continuing point of controversy. In a review of 2021 development, journalists and technical analysts Mark Hughes and Giorgio Piola called McLaren's diffuser the "most original" innovation of the season.

=== Liveries ===
McLaren elected not to include any Mercedes branding on the 2021 livery, in contrast to the MCL35 which featured Renault branding. Other than the removal of the #WeRaceAsOne graphic on the MCL35 halo (but the retention of the sidepod graphic) the MCL35M livery remained largely the same.

For the Monaco Grand Prix, McLaren received special permission from the FIA and Formula One to run the MCL35M with a one-off Gulf livery (a light blue livery with an orange stripe, featured by many Gulf Oil-sponsored teams). The branding was also applied to driver overalls and team uniforms, and both drivers used matching helmet designs for the Grand Prix. The team ran a second one-off livery at the Abu Dhabi Grand Prix in partnership with Vuse, featuring the work of local artist Rabab Tantawy. Both liveries, but particularly the Gulf colours, had a positive reception amongst fans. The McLaren MCL36 featured a new colour scheme inspired by the success of the Gulf livery.

=== 2021 season ===
==== Pre-season ====
After the conclusion of the 2020 season, Seidl said he did not believe McLaren could compete with Mercedes and Red Bull (who finished first and second in the 2020 WCC) in the 2021 season, and that the team would instead work to reduce their pace deficit over multiple seasons. McLaren Racing CEO Zak Brown said that the more competitive midfield meant McLaren "could find ourselves closer to Mercedes [...] but slipping to fifth in the Championship". When questioned on the possibility of McLaren challenging for podiums more regularly in the 2021 season, Norris said "that's too much" and that "The Mercedes engine and back-end is a good step forward but it won't sort everything out. We won't be able to just get podiums in every race."

Hywel Thomas, managing director of Mercedes Powertrains, said they "have got some issues with the power units" mainly due to the restricted dynamometer use, but was confident these issues would be resolved by the start of the season. He announced that Mercedes would not deliver any upgrades to their 2021 engine, meaning the MCL35M used the same specification engine for the entire season. (Note: In comparison, both the Honda RA621H and the Ferrari 065/6 received an upgrade in-season at the Belgian and Turkish Grands Prix (respectively), while the Renault E-Tech 21 did not.) Key said that McLaren had not encountered these issues in its own dyno testing.

The MCL35M had its first shakedown on 16 February 2021 in a filming day at Silverstone Circuit. McLaren was generally quick in pre-season testing (held at the Bahrain International Circuit), setting several fastest laps without any major reliability issues. Norris said the test had "gone well" and that the team was "maybe a little more confident than we were last year."

==== Opening rounds ====
Both drivers appeared quick in practice for the Bahrain Grand Prix, but said they were dissatisfied with the MCL35M's handling and balance, and expected the team would be slower than Mercedes and Red Bull and closer to the rest of the field when it came to qualifying and the race. Ricciardo and Norris qualified sixth and seventh respectively. In the race, Norris overtook Ricciardo and Leclerc in the opening laps and held position to finish fourth. Ricciardo struggled with tyre temperature and finished seventh. Ricciardo's lack of pace was later attributed to damage to his car's floor after he was hit by Gasly in the opening laps. The result left McLaren third in the WCC after Red Bull and ahead of Ferrari, with Norris fourth and Ricciardo seventh in the WDC.

Ricciardo qualified sixth and Norris seventh for the Emilia Romagna Grand Prix, a result Norris was disappointed with given his final qualifying lap would have been third quickest had it not been struck for a track limits violation. In the wet race, team orders were used to allow Norris to pass Ricciardo early in the race after the latter continued to struggle with pace. Norris finished third after losing second place to Hamilton after an extended battle in the closing laps, while Ricciardo finished the race sixth. McLaren remained third in the WCC, with Norris moving up to third in the WDC and Ricciardo remaining seventh. Seidl later said the team was pleased neither MCL35M chassis had sustained notable damage in the first two races, which would help ensure McLaren remained within their cost cap for the season.

Norris and Ricciardo qualified seventh and sixteenth, respectively, for the Portuguese Grand Prix. Ricciardo's elimination in the first qualifying stage (Q1) was the first for a McLaren since the 2019 Brazilian Grand Prix. In the race, Norris finished fifth and Ricciardo recovered to ninth, meaning McLaren remained the only team to have had both drivers score points in every race of the season.

McLaren ran the MCL35M with a T-wing and introduced a new front wing and floor for the Spanish Grand Prix. The new front wing was optimized to suit a higher-downforce configuration, while McLaren became the eighth team to implement a Z-shaped floor cut-out. (Note: The Z-shape cutout involves the removal of a portion of the edge of the car's floor, designed to create a vortex at the edge of the floor to increase negative pressure under the car. This increases the downforce produced by the floor, lessening the downforce lost due to the 2021 regulation changes.) The overall effect of the upgrades was to reduce the pitch sensitivity of the car. (Note: Pitch sensitivity refers to the instability in the car caused by unbalanced downforce as the ride height of the car changes under braking.) Ricciardo qualified seventh and stated he felt more confident in the MCL35M with the upgrade package. Norris qualified ninth, a result he was disappointed with after he was impeded by Haas driver Nikita Mazepin in Q1 and had to use an extra set of soft tyres, limiting the running he could do in Q3. The issue was compounded by floor damage Norris incurred after running wide in turns eight and nine in his first Q3 lap. Ricciardo finished the race sixth and Norris eighth, a result Seidl said he was happy with given the difficulty of overtaking on the circuit. In the WDC, Norris lost third place to Bottas.

The MCL35M featured a one-off Gulf livery for the Monaco Grand Prix (see § Liveries). Norris qualified for the race fifth, but Ricciardo was eliminated in Q2 and was classified twelfth. Ricciardo described the MCL35M as having a much narrower operating window than other cars he had driven, which was contributing to his struggles. In the race, Norris defended his position from Pérez to finish third after Leclerc did not start and Bottas retired. Ricciardo lost places on the race start before eventually being lapped by Norris and finishing twelfth. This was the first time a McLaren had been classified outside the top ten since the 2020 Portuguese Grand Prix, and ended McLaren's streak of both drivers scoring points at every race in 2021. Norris regained third in the WDC, while Ricciardo fell to eighth.

In a qualifying session interrupted with many yellow and red flags, Norris qualified sixth and Ricciardo thirteenth for the Azerbaijan Grand Prix, with the latter's qualifying ending after colliding with the barriers. Norris was awarded a three-place grid penalty for violating red flag procedures and started the race ninth. Norris had a poor start and fell to twelfth, but both drivers avoided the incidents occurring on track and worked their way up to fifth and ninth. Norris lost third place in the WDC to race winner Pérez, while Ricciardo fell to tenth. The team lost third place in the WCC to Ferrari.

==== European races ====
Major McLaren Group shareholder Mansour Ojjeh died shortly before the 2021 French Grand Prix, and his name was featured on the side of the cars as a tribute. The MCL35M featured a new rear wing endplate for the race with horizontal louvres rather than vertical strakes to better control turbulence at the rear of the car. The upgrade package also included a new, slimmer engine cover, and introduced 'horns' (fins mounted at the front of the car, just ahead of the halo) to redirect airflow over the top of the car. Norris qualified for the race eighth, and after falling to tenth after a poor start finished fifth; Ricciardo qualified tenth and finished sixth. McLaren reclaimed third place in the WCC as Ferrari struggled with tyre degradation on their car, while Ricciardo moved up to ninth in the WDC.

At the Styrian Grand Prix, Norris qualified fourth but was promoted to third due to a penalty issued to Bottas, while Ricciardo qualified thirteenth. Norris allowed Pérez and Bottas to pass him in the opening laps, as McLaren did not believe the MCL35M had the pace to maintain position ahead of the Red Bull and Mercedes cars, and finished fifth. Ricciardo made up four places on the race start until he suffered a power unit issue and fell to twelfth. Although the issue was fixed, Ricciardo finished thirteenth.

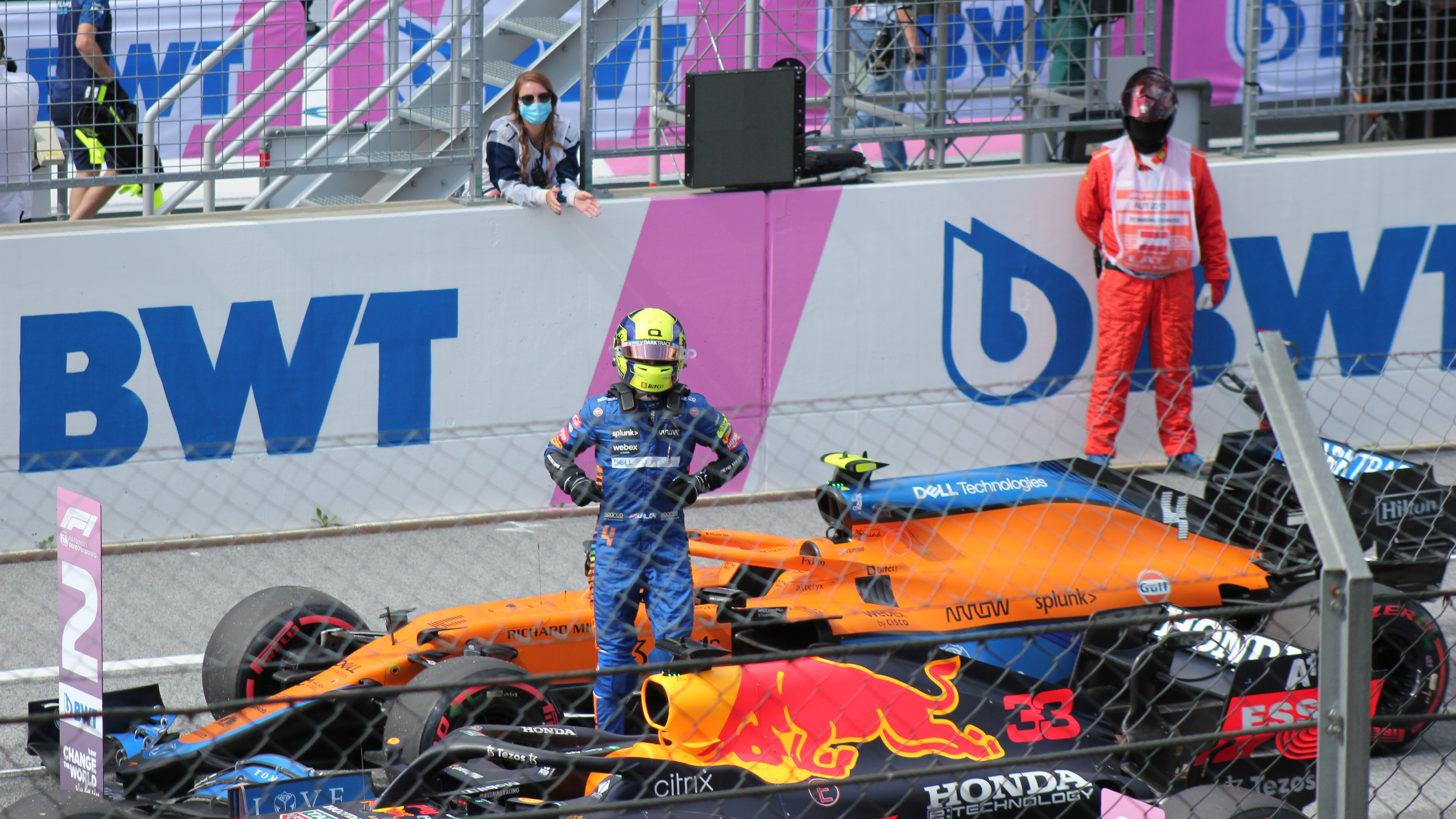
Norris qualified second for the Austrian Grand Prix, his career-best grid start at the time and McLaren's best since 2012, and finished on the podium for the second consecutive year

The car featured a new floor and additional guide vanes near the Z-shape cutout for the Austrian Grand Prix, and the cut-out's area was reduced. Norris qualified second for the race, 0.048 seconds off polesitter Verstappen's time and out-qualifying both works Mercedes cars – the first time a McLaren had qualified on the front row since 2012, and Norris' career-best qualifying result. Ricciardo qualified thirteenth. Norris held position for the first 20 laps, and in doing so attracted a five-second penalty for forcing Pérez to run wide. The penalty was served on-track at Norris' scheduled pit stop, and he recovered to overtake Hamilton for third place on lap 52 and finished on the podium for the third time in the 2021 season. Both Seidl and Norris said they believed the team would have been able to challenge for second place had they not been awarded a penalty. Ricciardo finished seventh, and improved to eighth in the WDC.

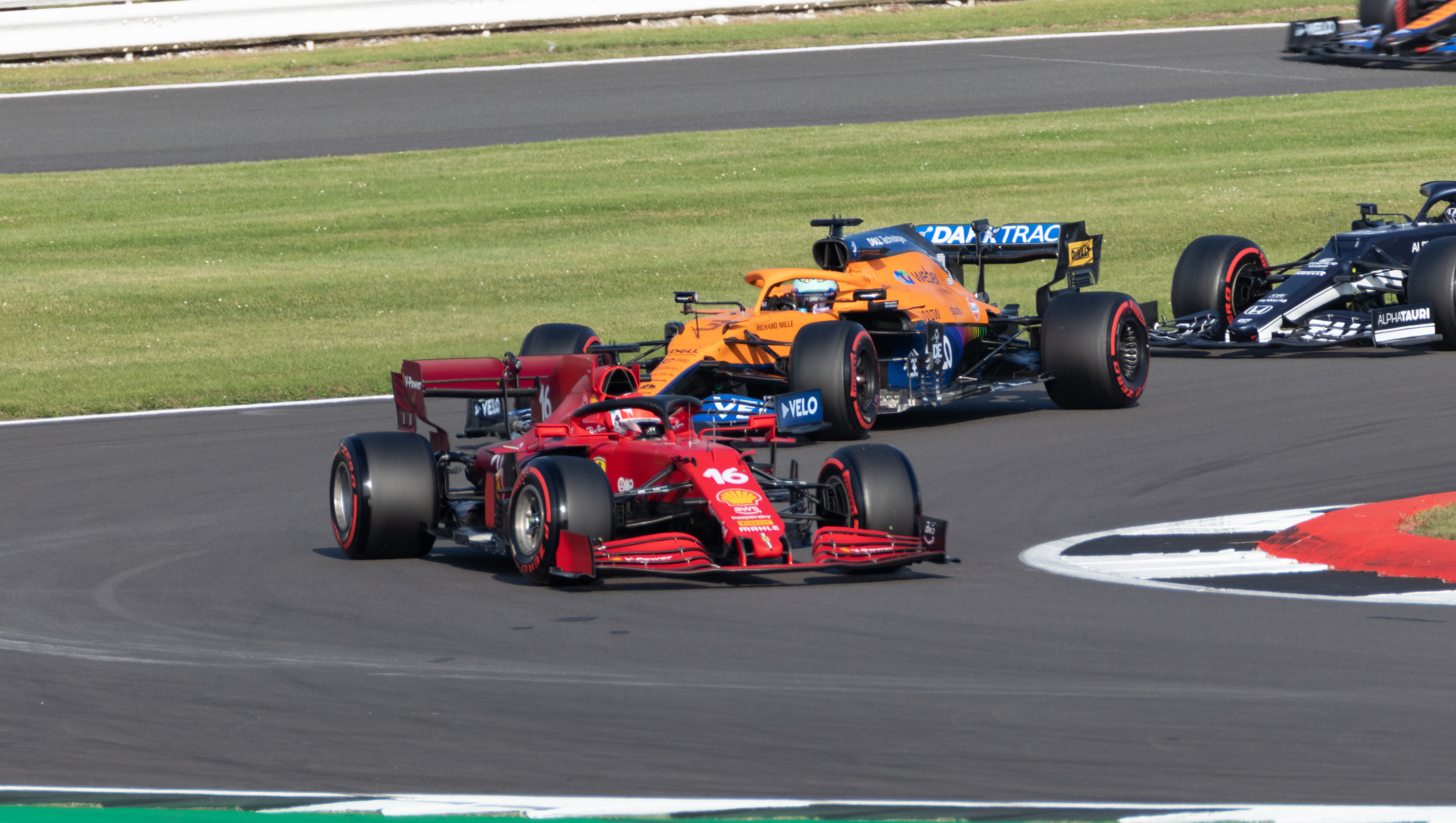
Ricciardo pursuing the Ferrari SF21 of Charles Leclerc with the AlphaTauri AT02 of Yuki Tsunoda following behind, during the British Grand Prix.

Norris qualified sixth and Ricciardo seventh for the first trial of sprint qualifying at the British Grand Prix. Both drivers improved by one place to start the race fifth and sixth. Norris overtook Bottas on the race start and inherited third place after Verstappen and Hamilton collided, with the former crashing out of the race. He finished the race fourth but was disappointed after a slow pit stop allowed Bottas to recover his position. Ricciardo moved up to and finished fifth, defending his position from Sainz after both completed their scheduled pit stops. Norris moved up to third place in the WDC. After the race, Norris suggested that the Ferrari SF21 was a faster car than the MCL35M, and singled out the SF21's tyre management and high-temperature performance over the McLaren.

McLaren delivered their final major upgrade to the MCL35M at the Hungarian Grand Prix in order to focus on the car's successor; the package featured revised bargeboards. Norris qualified sixth for the race and Ricciardo eleventh. Both drivers had good starts: Norris had made his way up to third place by the first corner, but was hit from behind by Bottas and then collided with Verstappen. Simultaneously, Stroll collided with Leclerc who was forced into Ricciardo. Both MCL35Ms suffered heavy damage, and Norris retired during the red flag, becoming the first McLaren retirement since the 2020 Eifel Grand Prix and ending his fifteen race point-scoring streak. Ricciardo's damage was estimated to cost him approximately 0.8 seconds per lap. He finished the race twelfth and was promoted to eleventh after Vettel's disqualification, making the Hungarian Grand Prix the team's first pointless race in seventeen Grands Prix. Ferrari drew level with McLaren on points in the WCC, and took third place after the count-back. Ricciardo lost eighth in the WDC. After the Grand Prix, McLaren remained at the track for two days to take part in a test session for Pirelli's 2022 tyre prototypes. Both Ricciardo and Norris drove a mule car based on the MCL35M during the test, which focused on the soft compound tyres.

New brake ducts were introduced to the MCL35M at the Belgian Grand Prix. The car performed well in a wet qualifying session, with Ricciardo qualifying for the race fourth, his best with the team. Norris set the fastest times in Q1 and Q2, but lost control of his car at Eau Rouge and crashed heavily, ending his qualifying session and damaging his gearbox. After penalties for Bottas from the previous race and for Norris's gearbox change were applied, he started the race fifteenth. Heavy rain prevented the race from starting, with three laps completed under safety car conditions before the Grand Prix was abandoned and results drawn from the end of the first lap. Thus, Ricciardo was classified fourth and Norris fourteenth. Half points were awarded, allowing McLaren to take third place from Ferrari.

Ricciardo qualified tenth for the Dutch Grand Prix, while Norris was eliminated in Q2 after missing his final qualifying attempt due to red flags, the first time he failed to make Q3 in 2021. He started the race thirteenth. Ricciardo's car suffered a clutch malfunction at the start, costing him places on the first lap. Both drivers struggled for pace, with Norris finishing tenth and Ricciardo eleventh. Norris fell from third to fourth and Ricciardo from eighth to ninth in the WDC, and the team again lost third place to Ferrari in the WCC.

The MCL35M featured a low downforce set up for the Italian Grand Prix, with modified front and rear wings. Norris qualified fourth and Ricciardo fifth for the second sprint of the season. During sprint qualifying, Ricciardo moved up to third, and both drivers were promoted a place after provisional polesitter Bottas took an engine penalty. During the race, Ricciardo overtook Verstappen into the first corner, while Norris defended from Hamilton behind. After the first round of pit stops, Verstappen and Hamilton collided, leaving the McLarens free to challenge for the win. Norris was instructed in the closing stages not to challenge Ricciardo's position. Ricciardo set the fastest lap on the final lap, leading Norris to the finish to claim McLaren's first one-two finish since the 2010 Canadian Grand Prix and first win since the 2012 Brazilian Grand Prix. Ricciardo regained eighth in the WDC, while McLaren reclaimed third place in the WCC. The MCL35M was the only car to achieve a 1–2 finish in the 2021 season.

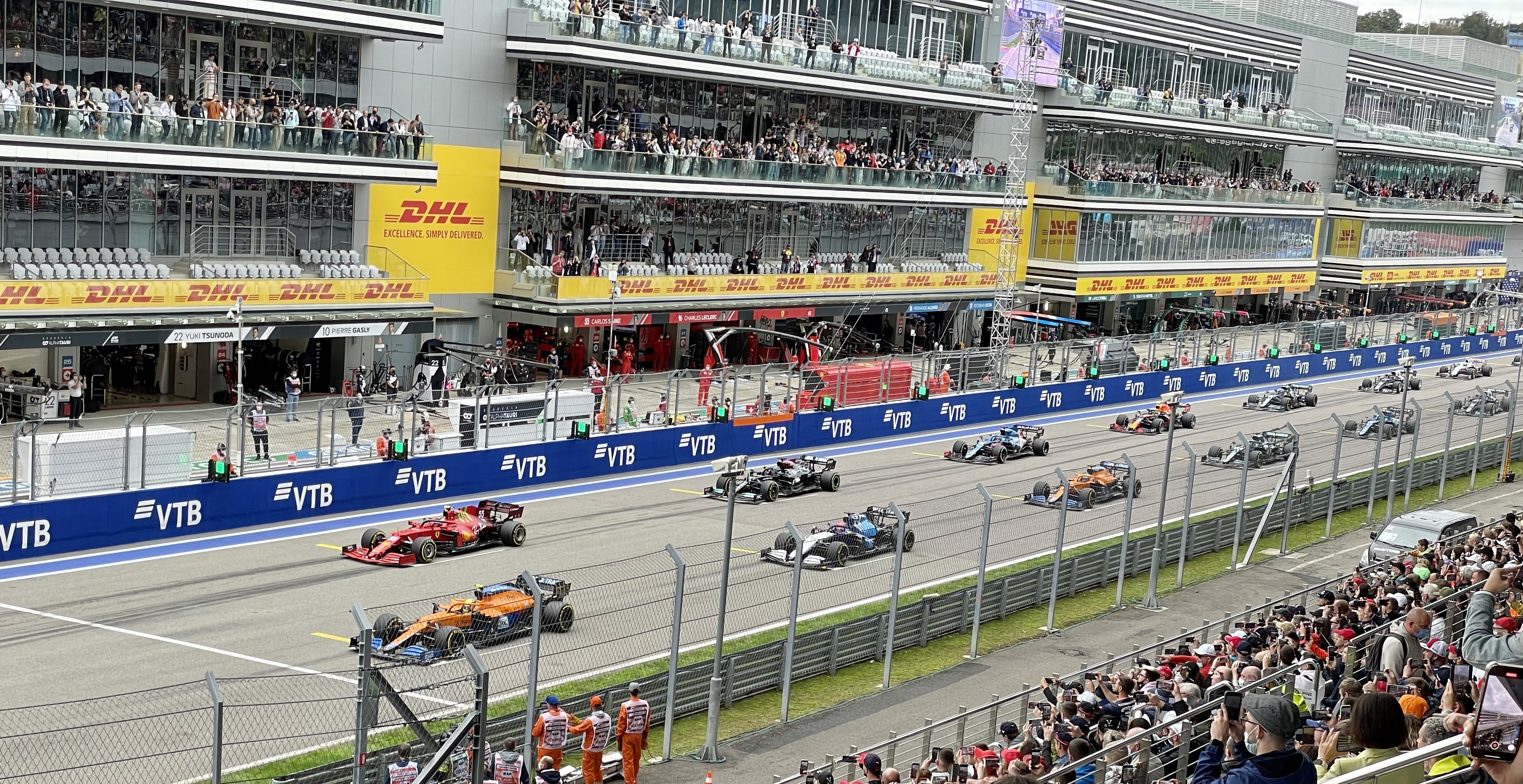
Norris started on pole for the first time in his Formula One career at the Russian Grand Prix. Ricciardo is also visible starting fifth.

Ricciardo suffered a power unit malfunction during practice for the Russian Grand Prix which necessitated a change to an older engine. The car was run with a high downforce aerodynamic kit. Norris qualified on pole for the first time in his career, while Ricciardo started fifth. Although he lost first place to Sainz on the opening lap, Norris regained the lead and led the race. With nine laps to go, Hamilton unsuccessfully began to attack for first place. Although the race had been dry up to this point, it began to rain lightly with six laps remaining. With four laps left, McLaren recommended Norris switch from hard slicks to intermediate rain tyres, which Norris refused, a decision he later said "was right at the time for the conditions at the time" but ultimately "cost us everything" as he slid off track and down to seventh place by the time he pitted. Seidl, Norris, and Hamilton all said the result was ultimately not a reflection of the MCL35M's pace and potential at the track, and Norris set the fastest lap of the race. Ricciardo, however, switched to intermediates earlier and finished fourth.

==== Closing rounds ====
McLaren used a high-downforce package and a double T-wing for the Turkish Grand Prix, for which Norris qualified eighth and Ricciardo sixteenth. Both were promoted a place on the grid by engine penalties for other drivers, but Norris said the MCL35M was "not easy to drive" at the circuit while Ricciardo said he was not "on top of it today". McLaren decided to replace several engine components on Ricciardo's car, triggering the team's first component penalty of the season and sending him to the back of the grid. Norris finished seventh and Ricciardo thirteenth.

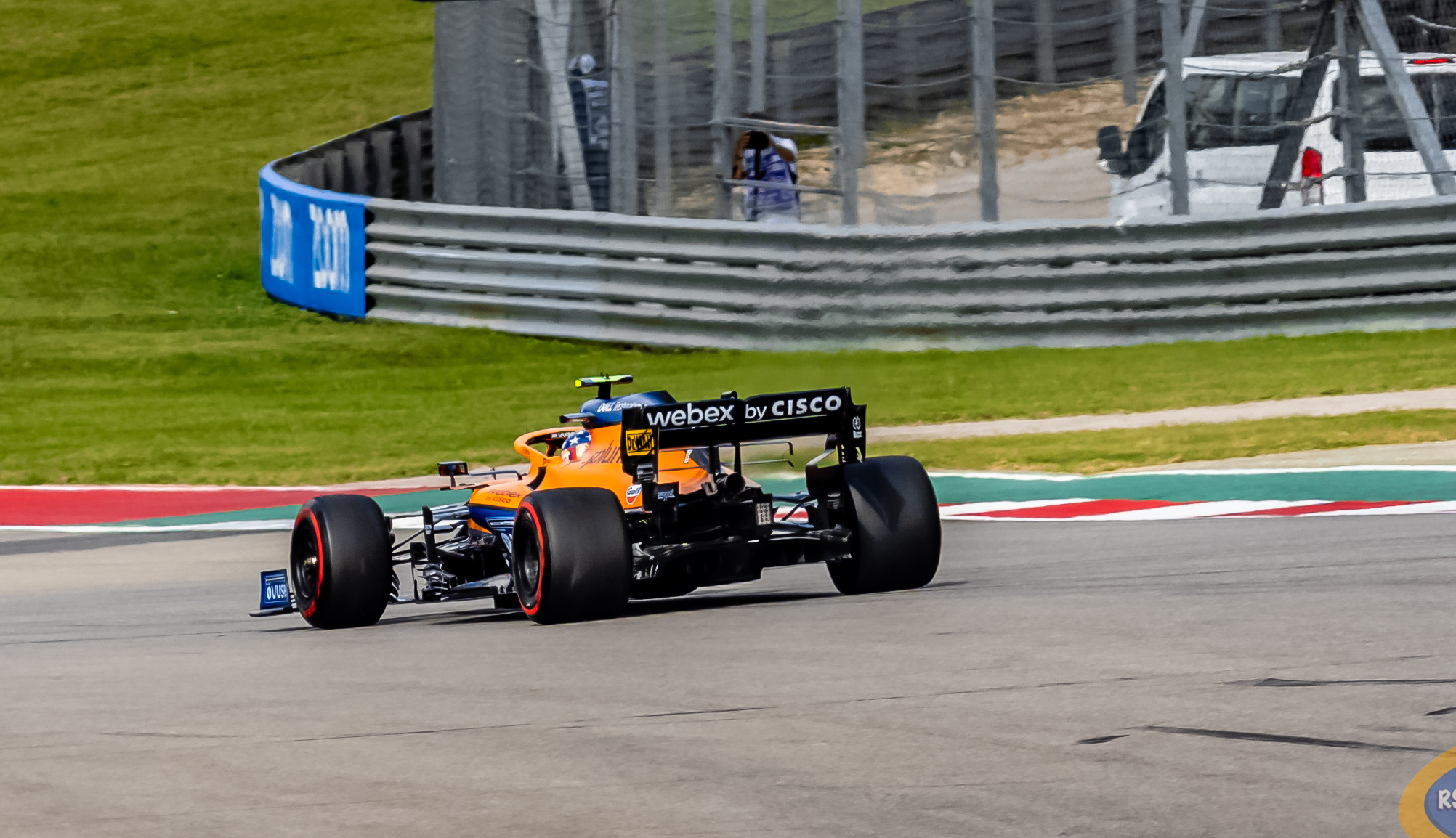
Norris during the United States Grand Prix

Ricciardo qualified seventh and Norris eighth for the United States Grand Prix, with both being promoted a place due to another engine penalty for Bottas. Both drivers said they were surprised to be out-qualified by the two Ferrari drivers. Ricciardo finished the race fifth, and said he was satisfied given the superior pace of the Ferraris. Norris finished eighth and called his performance "disappointing", losing fourth place in the WDC.

The car was fit with a high-downforce rear wing and T-wing for the Mexico City Grand Prix. Ricciardo's running in practice was limited by a gearbox issue. Ricciardo qualified seventh, with McLaren using Norris to provide a tow since his car was fitted with multiple new power unit elements requiring Norris to start from the back of the grid. As a result, Norris started eighteenth. Ricciardo had a strong start and ran alongside polesitter Bottas into turn one, but the two collided and dropped to the back of the field. Ricciardo finished twelfth after managing damage on his MCL35M, and Norris made up positions to finish tenth. McLaren lost third place in the WCC to Ferrari.

Norris and Ricciardo qualified eighth and ninth respectively for the third and final sprint race of the season at the São Paulo Grand Prix, but were both promoted a place by Hamilton's disqualification. Norris improved to sixth, while Ricciardo fell to eleventh. Norris was promoted a place on the grid due to a power unit penalty for Hamilton. At the race start, Norris made contact with Sainz and suffered a tyre puncture that dropped him to last place. He finished tenth, while Ricciardo retired due to a power unit failure.

For the inaugural Qatar Grand Prix, Norris qualified sixth (and was promoted to fourth after grid penalties were applied) and Ricciardo qualified fourteenth. During the race, Norris ran in fourth until he suffered a tyre puncture, and finished ninth. Ricciardo finished twelfth while suffering from a system error affecting fuel usage on his MCL35M. Seidl said that the triple-header of Mexico, São Paulo, and Qatar had been disappointing given the team believed the car remained competitive with Ferrari's SF21.

Norris qualified seventh and Ricciardo eleventh for the first Saudi Arabian Grand Prix, with the latter suffering floor damage. Seidl said that the team was underperforming relative to expectations because corners at the Jeddah Corniche Circuit were primarily medium-speed rather than high-speed as had been predicted. During the race, Norris pitted before the first red flag and therefore lost positions to all drivers who had not yet pitted by the restart. He restarted in fourteenth and finished tenth. Ricciardo was in the opposite situation and finished fifth. Norris lost fifth place in the WDC and fell to sixth.

The MCL35M featured a one-off Vuse livery for the Abu Dhabi Grand Prix (see § Liveries). Norris qualified third for the race and Ricciardo qualified tenth. Norris had a poor start and lost two positions, maintaining fifth place until he suffered a slow puncture and gearbox issues; he finished seventh. Ricciardo finished twelfth, losing positions under the virtual safety car. Norris finished sixth in the WDC and Ricciardo eighth, and McLaren finished fourth in the WCC. With a new generation of cars being introduced in 2022, the race was the final entry for the MCL35M.

McLaren participated in the post-season Pirelli test after the Abu Dhabi Grand Prix at Yas Marina Circuit. Unlike the in-season test, the tyres used were the final compounds. Ricciardo and Norris drove mule cars based on the MCL35M to test the 2022 compounds. Pato O'Ward, an Arrow McLaren SP driver in the IndyCar series, tested the regular MCL35M.

=== Assessment and characteristics ===
Like the MCL35, the MCL35M was termed an "all-rounder" early in the season, and was closer to the cars of Mercedes and Red Bull than its predecessors.

Ricciardo's struggles with the car were attributed to the "strange" level of overlap in the braking and cornering phases, particularly in slow corners. As such, the MCL35M tended to perform better in high-speed corners, but struggled with low-speed cornering. McLaren themselves called the car's mid-corner performance "its Achilles' heel". The car had good straight line speed and effective power deployment, and Sainz (who drove for Ferrari in 2021) called it one of the most difficult cars to overtake. Conversely, the car's main competitor, the Ferrari SF21, excelled at cornering, especially at low speeds.

== Later use ==
The original specification MCL35 was displayed at the 2022 Goodwood Festival of Speed. One MCL35M – that driven by Ricciardo when he won the Italian Grand Prix – is now part of McLaren Racing CEO Zak Brown's personal collection.

The MCL35M continued to be used in 2022 for private tests as part of McLaren's Testing of Previous Cars program. FIA Formula 2 Championship driver and Red Bull Junior Team member Jehan Daruvala tested the car over two days at Silverstone Circuit prior to the British Grand Prix, completing 130 laps. A second test at Algarve International Circuit was held in July: IndyCar driver Colton Herta completed 162 laps over two days, and McLaren simulator driver Will Stevens tested for one. 2021 IndyCar Series champion Álex Palou and O'Ward tested the MCL35M at Circuit de Barcelona-Catalunya during September 2022, together completing a total of 267 laps. O'Ward and Palou again tested the car at the Red Bull Ring in October 2022, together completing 171 laps over two days. In November 2022, the car was used in a private two-day test at Circuit Paul Ricard for Oscar Piastri, who McLaren signed to replace Ricciardo in 2023. Piastri had a second test in November at Circuit de Barcelona-Catalunya, completing 150 laps.

In February 2023, the MCL35M was again run over two days at Circuit de Barcelona-Catalunya for private tests with Norris and Piastri to prepare for the 2023 season. Norris and Piastri again tested the car in April 2023 in a two-day private test at Imola, but the purpose of the test was not made public. The car was again used for a three-day test at the Hungaroring in June 2023, driven by Piastri, Palou, and test and simulator driver Oliver Turvey. Mick Schumacher, who joined the team as a reserve driver for 2023, tested the car at Algarve International Circuit in July. World Endurance Champion Ryō Hirakawa and O'Ward drove the car in a private test at Circuit de Barcelona-Catalunya in October. At the same test, Brown drove his own MCL35M.

McLaren ran a multi-day test at Silverstone in September 2024 in which Brown drove his MCL35M and O'Ward drove an MCL36.

== Complete Formula One results ==
Key

Key
Colour	Result
Gold	Winner
Silver	Second place
Bronze	Third place
Green	Other points position
Blue	Other classified position
Blue	Not classified, finished (NC)
Purple	Not classified, retired (Ret)
Red	Did not qualify (DNQ)
Black	Disqualified (DSQ)
White	Did not start (DNS)
White	Race cancelled (C)
Blank	Did not practice (DNP)
Blank	Excluded (EX)
Blank	Did not arrive (DNA)
Blank	Withdrawn (WD)
Blank	Did not enter (empty cell)
Annotation	Meaning
P	Pole position
F	Fastest lap
Superscript number	Points-scoring position in sprint

Year	Entrant	Chassis	Power unit	Tyres	Drivers	Grands Prix																						Points	WCC
2020	McLaren F1 Team	MCL35	Renault; E-Tech 20; 1.6 V6 t	P		AUT	STY	HUN	GBR	70A	ESP	BEL	ITA	TUS	RUS	EIF	POR	EMI	TUR	BHR	SKH	ABU						202	3rd
2020	McLaren F1 Team	MCL35	Renault; E-Tech 20; 1.6 V6 t	P	(United Kingdom) Lando Norris	3^{F}	5	13	5	9	10	7	4	6	15	Ret	13	8	8^{F}	4	10	5						202	3rd
2020	McLaren F1 Team	MCL35	Renault; E-Tech 20; 1.6 V6 t	P	(Spain) Carlos Sainz Jr.	5	9^{F}	9	13	13	6	DNS	2	Ret	Ret	5	6	7	5	5	4	6						202	3rd
2021	McLaren F1 Team	MCL35M	Mercedes-AMG; F1 M12 E Performance; 1.6 V6 t	P		BHR	EMI	POR	ESP	MON	AZE	FRA	STY	AUT	GBR	HUN	BEL^{‡}	NED	ITA	RUS	TUR	USA	MXC	SAP	QAT	SAU	ABU	275	4th
2021	McLaren F1 Team	MCL35M	Mercedes-AMG; F1 M12 E Performance; 1.6 V6 t	P	(United Kingdom) Lando Norris	4	3	5	8	3	5	5	5	3	4	Ret	14	10	2	7^{P}^{F}	7	8	10	10	9	10	7	275	4th
2021	McLaren F1 Team	MCL35M	Mercedes-AMG; F1 M12 E Performance; 1.6 V6 t	P	(Australia) Daniel Ricciardo	7	6	9	6	12	9	6	13	7	5	11	4	11	1^{F 3}	4	13	5	12	Ret	12	5	12	275	4th

Note

- ‡ – Half points were awarded at the 2021 Belgian Grand Prix as less than 75% of the scheduled distance was completed due to heavy rain.
