= McLaren MCL36 =

2022 Formula One racing car built and used by McLaren

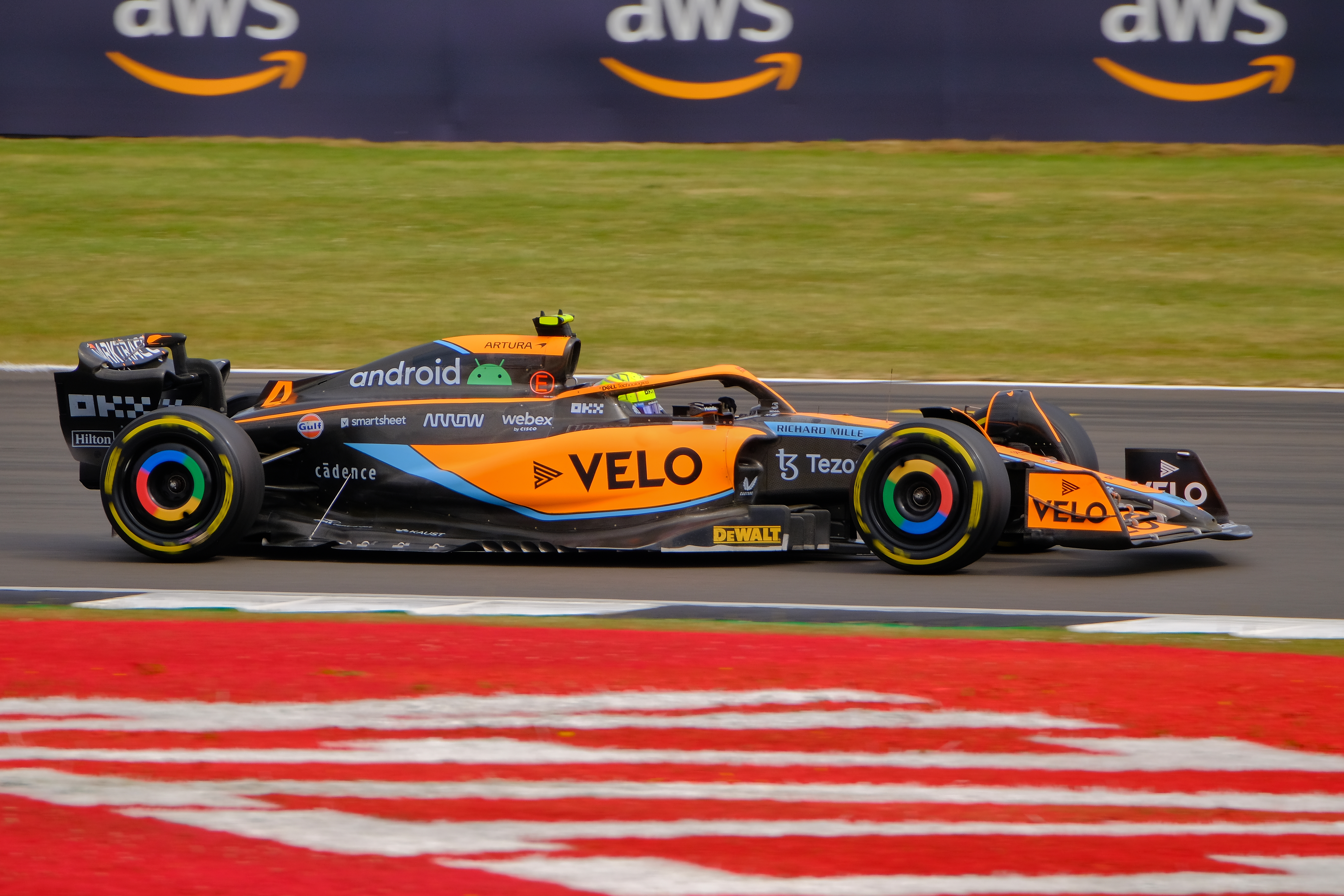
- Lando Norris drives a McLaren MCL36 during the British Grand Prix
- Category: Formula One
- Constructor: McLaren
- Designer: James Key (Technical Director)
- Predecessor: McLaren MCL35M
- Successor: McLaren MCL60

Technical specifications
- Chassis: Carbon fibre composite with survival cell and honeycomb structure
- Suspension (front): Carbon fibre and steel pullrod suspension legs and elements operating inboard torsion bar and damper system
- Suspension (rear): Carbon fibre wishbone and pushrod suspension elements operating inboard torsion bar and damper system
- Engine: Mercedes-AMG F1 M13 E Performance 1.6 L (98 cu in) direct injection V6 turbocharged engine limited to 15,000 RPM in a mid-mounted, rear-wheel drive layout
- Electric motor: Mercedes-AMG Kinetic and thermal energy recovery systems
- Transmission: McLaren 8-speed + 1 reverse sequential seamless semi-automatic transmission operated via paddle shifters with limited slip epicyclic differential
- Battery: Mercedes-AMG lithium-ion
- Weight: 795 kg (including driver, excluding fuel)
- Brakes: 6-piston calipers, carbon ventilated discs/pads
- Tyres: Pirelli P Zero (dry); Pirelli Cinturato (wet)
- Clutch: Electro-hydraulically operated, carbon multi-plate

Competition history
- Notable entrants: McLaren F1 Team
- Notable drivers: 3. (Australia) Daniel Ricciardo; 4. (United Kingdom) Lando Norris
- Debut: 2022 Bahrain Grand Prix
- Last event: 2022 Abu Dhabi Grand Prix
| Races | Podiums | F/Laps |
|---|---|---|
| 22 | 1 | 2 |

The McLaren MCL36 is a Formula One car that was designed under the lead of James Key and manufactured by McLaren to compete in the 2022 Formula One World Championship. The MCL36 was built to the new 2022 generation of Formula One technical regulations, which were originally intended for introduction in 2021. The car was widely considered to exhibit conventional and unambitious engine packaging. However, it stood out for a unique suspension layout not seen on any Formula One car for nearly ten years, and was noted for its lack of porpoising and good mechanical reliability.

The car made its début at the 2022 Bahrain Grand Prix, and was driven by Daniel Ricciardo and Lando Norris in their second and fourth years for the team, respectively. The car achieved two fastest laps and one podium finish over the course of the season, all scored by Norris. The MCL36 was the only car (and Norris the only driver) from outside the top three teams to finish on the podium in the 2022 season. However, the MCL36 is generally seen as a disappointment compared to its predecessor, the accomplished MCL35M, with inconsistent performance and a narrow operating window. Ricciardo's continued underperformance compared to Norris was also considered a significant contributing factor in McLaren's loss to Alpine in a season-long fight for fourth place in the World Constructors' Championship.

== Background ==
=== Development context ===
McLaren's switch to Mercedes engines was meant to coincide with the new technical regulations and was therefore contracted for 2021. Planning for the new regulations started in early 2019 and active development of the car started in 2020 before the 2021 regulations change was postponed. This postponement was intended to reduce financial pressures on teams due to the COVID-19 pandemic, while teams' 2020 chassis were to be reused in 2021. Hence, McLaren's switch to Mercedes power units occurred with the MCL36's predecessor, the MCL35M.

Aerodynamic development of all teams' 2022 cars was paused from 28 March 2020 until 31 December 2020 because of the postponement of the regulatory change. McLaren restarted development in early January 2021 with aerodynamic testing. Manufacturing of some components, mainly chassis and gearbox parts, was underway by July 2021.

=== Initial design and development ===
Key was originally hired by McLaren from Toro Rosso in early 2019, when the MCL34 had already been designed and manufactured. Although he designed the MCL35 and the MCL35M upgrade, the MCL36 was Key's first completely original car for the team. Key called the development of the 2022 car's larger and less intricate surfaces a significant departure from the more specific and detailed development allowed in previous years.

By October 2021, the car was being run on the McLaren simulator. Norris termed it "not as nice" to drive, but was hesitant to draw conclusions before the physical car was complete given the rapid progress in 2022 designs. The chassis passed FIA homologation tests in early December 2021. Key stated that McLaren's primary goal was to produce a more balanced car that performed better in low-speed corners compared to the MCL35 and MCL35M, both of which lacked low-speed performance despite good high-speed cornering.

At its launch, the car was noted for its conventional tight packaging of the engine and its reversing of the typical suspension layout: the MCL36 featured pull-rod front suspension and push-rod rear suspension, a layout not seen on any Formula One car since 2013 on the McLaren MP4-28. This change maximised the downforce produced by the Venturi and ground effects by allowing unimpeded airflow in and out of the car's air inlets, increasing the volume of air moved through the floor. The floor featured an L-shaped edge wing and a ridged underfloor which was eventually emulated by other teams, most notably on the Ferrari F1-75.

=== Liveries ===
The MCL36 featured more vibrant, fluorescent shades of papaya orange and blue. The change was inspired after the MCL35M's one-off Gulf livery, featuring similar shades, received a very positive fan reaction. McLaren introduced a special livery in collaboration with sponsor OKX for the Singapore and Japanese Grands Prix. The livery featured new cyberpunk-themed illustrations and replaced the blue highlights with neon pink. A second special livery was used for the Abu Dhabi Grand Prix in collaboration with Vuse. As with the livery for the previous year's race, the car featured the artwork of an emerging artist, which on this occasion was Lebanese artist Anna Tangles.

== Competition and development history ==
=== Pre-season ===
During the first three-day test at Circuit de Barcelona-Catalunya, many teams experienced porpoising on their cars (resonation of the car due to the ground effect, making the car rock rapidly) which posed a driveability and reliability issue. Uniquely, the MCL36 did not appear to exhibit any issues with porpoising, although Key said "We suffer from it a bit, but it's not a major concern or a major distraction for the drivers." The lack of porpoising was partly linked to the MCL36's edge wing (an aerodynamic component on the outer edge of the car's floor). The solution was copied by several other teams over the course of the season. During the test, the team was forced to fit the most aggressive cooling options to the car's brakes, which was not expected to be needed until the second round of testing in the more demanding Bahraini conditions.

After the first round of testing, the car was generally expected to be competitive and enable McLaren to join a group of front-running teams. However, the second test at Bahrain International Circuit in higher temperatures exposed an issue with the MCL36's brakes, preventing the team from completing any long-run tests. As the team later put it, they "simply didn't have a cooling package big enough to cope" with the hotter conditions in Bahrain. Ricciardo tested positive to COVID-19 and was required to isolate, preventing him from completing any of his test program and leaving Norris to complete the test alone. The team said they had been unable to "do any optimization" to the car at the Bahrain test.

=== Opening rounds ===
McLaren introduced an "interim solution" to its front brake issues for the Bahrain Grand Prix. The team was disappointed in its performance, as neither car made it to the final stage of qualifying: Norris qualified thirteenth and Ricciardo eighteenth. Key said the car was performing as the team expected and the drivers were finding it a more consistent and predictable car, but that the MCL36 lacked aerodynamic and mechanical grip. Ricciardo finished fourteenth and Norris fifteenth. Ricciardo stated that he had treated the race as a test session in an attempt to recover time he had lost in the pre-season test. The result placed the team ninth in the Constructors' Championship (WCC).

No upgrades were made to the car at the Saudi Arabian Grand Prix, as parts were delayed to prioritise the front brake cooling solution. Norris qualified eleventh and Ricciardo twelfth, but the latter started fourteenth after receiving a grid penalty. Norris finished seventh, battling for sixth place on the final lap. Ricciardo did not finish the race, retiring with undiagnosed mechanical issues. Norris improved to tenth and Ricciardo fell to nineteenth in the Drivers' Championship (WDC), while the team improved to eighth in the WCC.

The team introduced an aerodynamic upgrade to the area around the rear brakes for the Australian Grand Prix, to improve the wake produced by the tyres and diffuser. Norris qualified fourth and Ricciardo qualified seventh, and finished fifth and sixth, respectively. The team improved to fourth in the WCC, and Norris to eighth and Ricciardo to eleventh in the WDC.

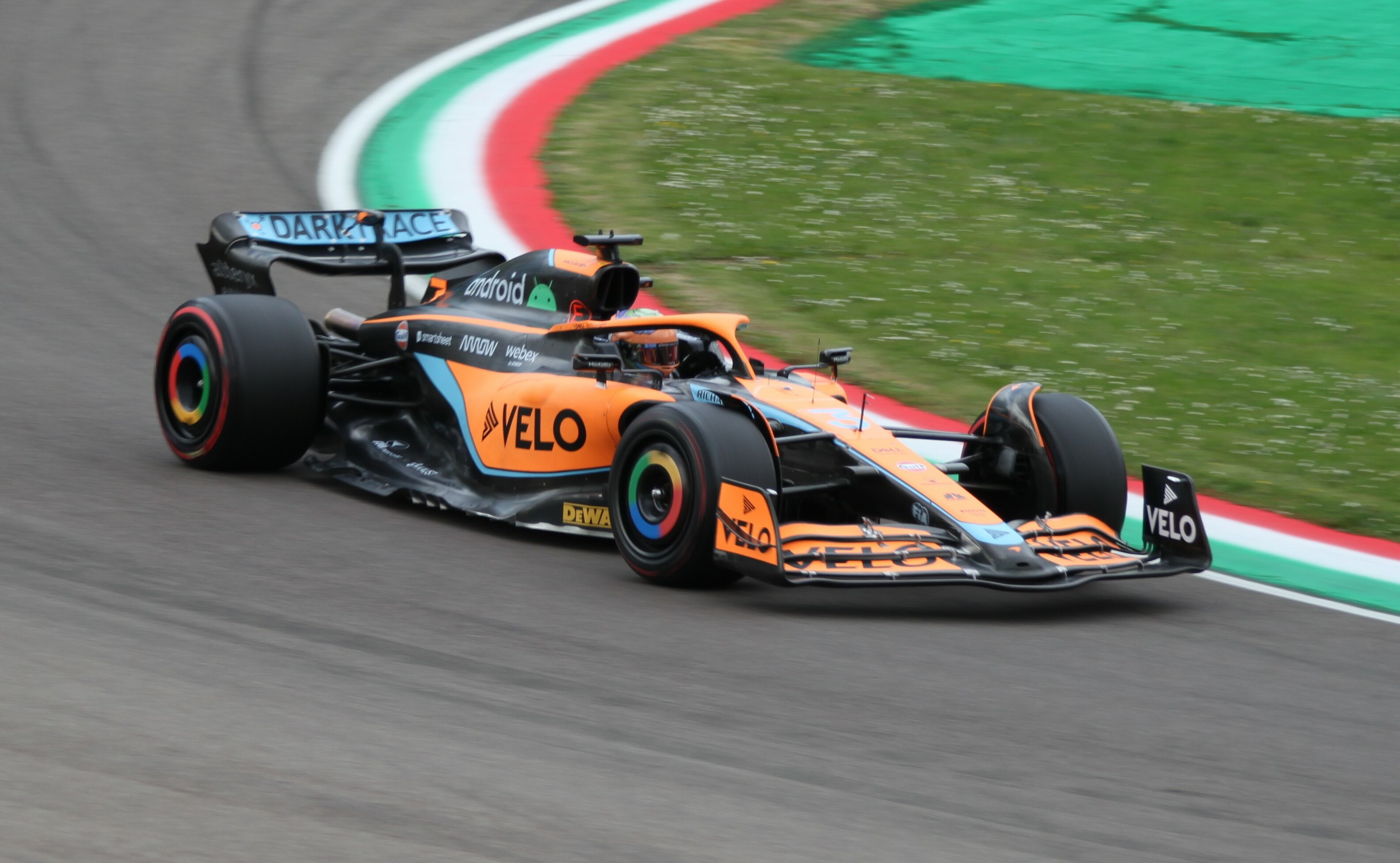
Ricciardo during the sprint at the Emilia Romagna Grand Prix. He finished the sprint sixth but finished the race eighteenth after a first lap incident.

The MCL36 featured a new beam wing (Note: The beam wing is a wing above the diffuser but below the rear wing, which directs turbulence upwards. It affects the performance of both the diffuser and the rear wing.) for the Emilia Romagna Grand Prix. Qualifying was wet, and Norris qualified third and Ricciardo sixth for the sprint. The drivers finished the sprint in fifth and sixth respectively. The race started in wet conditions, and out of the second corner, Ricciardo understeered into Sainz, ending the latter's race. Ricciardo suffered diffuser damage, and finished eighteenth. Norris made his way back up to third by the end of the first lap, but was overtaken by Leclerc and ran in fourth for most of the race, managing his gap to fifth place comfortably. In the closing laps, Leclerc bounced over a curb and had a mild collision with the barriers, allowing Norris to inherit third place. Norris improved to sixth in the WDC. The MCL36 was the only car (and Norris the only driver) from outside the top three teams (Red Bull, Ferrari, and Mercedes) to finish on the podium in the 2022 season.

The car's front suspension was strengthened for reliability and an additional floor stay was added to minimise porpoising in upgrades introduced at the Miami Grand Prix. Norris qualified eighth and Ricciardo fourteenth for the race. During the race, Norris was involved in a collision with Pierre Gasly whose AlphaTauri AT03 had suffered steering damage. Both retired from the race. Ricciardo finished eleventh but was demoted to thirteenth by a time penalty for overtaking off-track. Norris fell to seventh in the WDC.

McLaren introduced a total of ten upgrades for the Spanish Grand Prix, which consisted of changes to various aerodynamic parts, brakes, and suspension. Ricciardo likened the Friday practice running to winter testing given the quantity of changes. Ricciardo qualified ninth, and Norris, who lost a lap time due to a track limits violation, qualified eleventh. Norris, despite suffering from tonsillitis, finished eighth. Ricciardo finished twelfth.

At the Monaco Grand Prix, McLaren ran the car with extra cooling on the front brakes and different steering geometry and rear-view mirrors to account for the nature of the Circuit de Monaco. Norris and Ricciardo qualified fifth and fourteenth respectively. In a rain affected race, Norris finished sixth and set the fastest lap, and Ricciardo finished twelfth.

=== Mid-season rounds ===
The MCL36 was run with a track-specific aero kit to reduced load and more cooling options for the Azerbaijan Grand Prix. Norris qualified for the race eleventh and Ricciardo twelfth, and finished ninth and eighth respectively. Team orders were used twice in the race, first to keep Ricciardo behind Norris in the early stages and then to keep Norris behind Ricciardo in the final laps. The team's strategy was criticized for being ineffective and compromising both drivers' pace. Ricciardo fell to thirteenth in the WDC.

For the Canadian Grand Prix, McLaren updated the rear wing assembly for aerodynamic efficiency and changed the location of the floor stay for better stiffness. Norris suffered a power unit issue during qualifying which prevented him from setting a time in the second stage. He started fourteenth, while Ricciardo qualified ninth. During the first virtual safety car, Ricciardo was ninth and Norris twelfth, when McLaren attempted to double-stack a pit stop. After a slow stop for Ricciardo, the pit crew fitted the wrong tyres to Norris's car before correcting the mistake. Ricciardo exited twelfth and Norris eighteenth, and they finished eleventh and fifteenth respectively after both cars suffered brake issues in the final stages of the race.

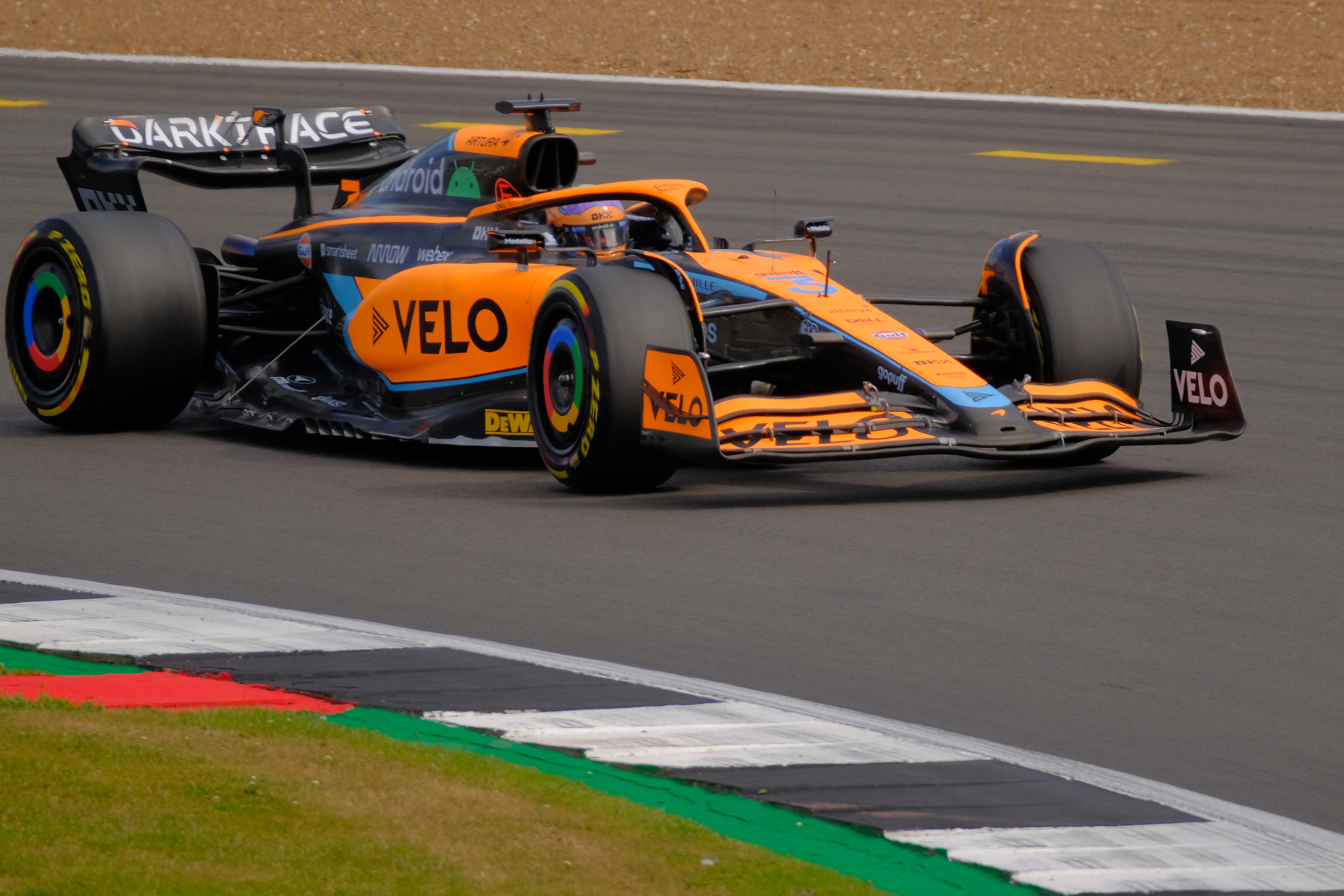
Ricciardo's MCL36 suffered DRS issues during the British Grand Prix, and he finished thirteenth.

McLaren announced ahead of the British Grand Prix that the MCL36 would not receive further major upgrades due to the budget cap. Instead, only minor technical updates would be provided. Norris qualified for the race sixth; and held fifth in the race until losing the position in the pits during the final safety car, finishing sixth. Ricciardo qualified fourteenth, but restarted twelfth after the red flag caused by Zhou Guanyu's first lap incident. A failure of the drag reduction system on his MCL36 necessitated an extra stop, and Ricciardo finished the race thirteenth. The result dropped Ricciardo to fourteenth in the WDC.

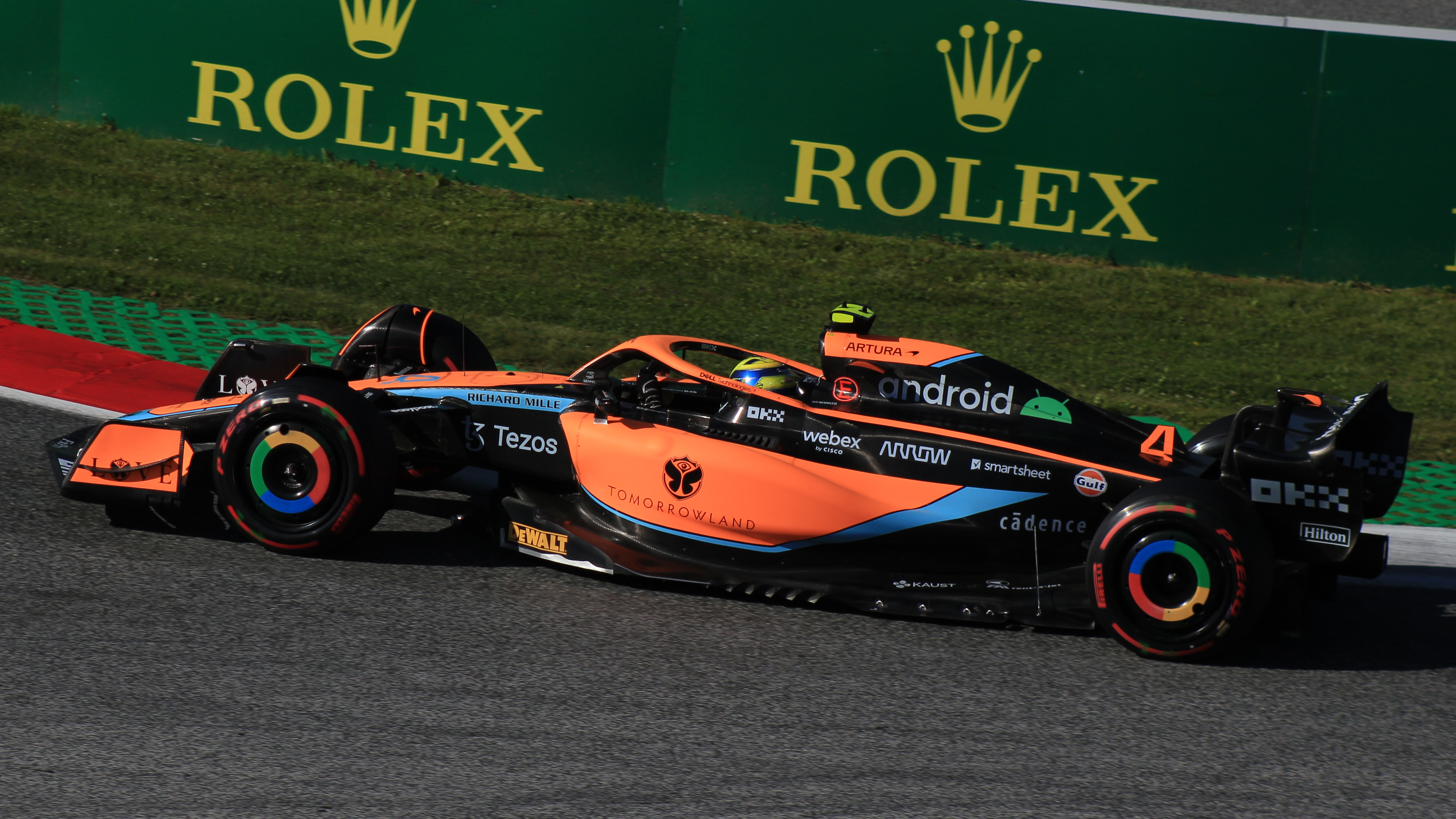
Norris driving during the Austrian Grand Prix: he improved from fifteenth in qualifying to seventh in the race by the end of the weekend.

The car featured revised brake ducts and rear wing endplates beginning with the Austrian Grand Prix. Norris suffered an engine failure in the first practice session and reverted to an older engine for the rest of the weekend. He also experienced brake issues during qualifying, and he qualified fifteenth and Ricciardo sixteenth for the second sprint of the season. The two finished eleventh and twelfth respectively in the sprint, which became tenth and eleventh on the starting grid after penalties were applied for other drivers. During the race Norris was awarded a time penalty for exceeding track limits, a penalty he said cost him the chance to challenge for sixth place as he finished seventh. Ricciardo finished ninth. Ricciardo improved to twelfth in the WDC. Alpine drew level with McLaren in the WCC, but McLaren retained fourth place after the countback. McLaren remained at the Red Bull Ring after the race for a Pirelli tyre test, with Ricciardo and Norris both doing a day of testing of the 2023 tyre compounds.

The MCL36 featured substantial upgrades from the French Grand Prix. Norris is pictured ahead of Ricciardo, with a collision between Tsunoda and Ocon in the background.

McLaren introduced another substantial upgrade package for the French Grand Prix, which featured a new diffuser, underfloor, rear brake ducts, and sidepods, as well as a change to the rear wing endplate for reliability. Most significantly, the shape of the sidepods changed dramatically. Throughout the turbo-hybrid era, teams pursued a narrow sidepod that exposed as much of the floor as possible, but the 2022 regulation changes limited this design concept's potential due to the primacy of the ground effect. The new MCL36 sidepods were similar to those featured on the title-challengers, the Ferrari F1-75 and Red Bull Racing RB18, with an emphasis on managing tyre wake and the introduction of a downwashing plane that delivers air to the rear of the car. The upgrade appeared effective in qualifying; Norris qualified fifth and Ricciardo eleventh. Ricciardo started ninth after grid penalties for two drivers ahead of him, and finished the race in ninth place. Norris had a poor start, and finished seventh. The result cost McLaren fourth in the WCC, and they fell to fifth behind Alpine.

Beginning with the Hungarian Grand Prix, the MCL36 featured revised front brake cooling system and new underfloor flow conditioners designed to better engage the diffuser. Norris qualified fourth and Ricciardo ninth. Norris finished seventh and Ricciardo finished thirteenth, but was demoted to fifteenth by a five-second penalty awarded for causing a collision with Lance Stroll.

An extensive list of updates débuted at the Belgian Grand Prix. This package included a low-drag rear wing, beam wing, and rear corner assembly, an updated diffuser and floor assembly, new front suspension track rods and a new winglet in the rear corner, and a streamlined circuit-specific engine cover. The overall aim of the package was to improve aerodynamic efficiency and maximise straight-line speed to take advantage of the low downforce requirements of Circuit de Spa-Francorchamps. Norris qualified tenth, but was relegated to seventeenth on the grid due as the team exceeded the number of allowable power unit components. Ricciardo qualified eleventh, but was promoted to seventh on the grid due to penalties for other drivers. Both drivers were caught in DRS trains. Norris finished the race twelfth and Ricciardo fifteenth, resulting in Ricciardo falling from twelfth to thirteenth in the WDC.

At the Dutch Grand Prix, Norris qualified and finished in seventh, and Ricciardo qualified and finished in seventeenth.

=== Closing rounds ===
The car was run in a low-downforce specification for the Italian Grand Prix. Norris and Ricciardo qualified seventh and eighth respectively, which became third and fourth respectively once grid penalties were applied to other drivers. The clutch map on Norris's MCL36 failed at the race start, forcing him to launch the car manually and costing him several positions on the first lap. He finished seventh, while Ricciardo retired after an oil leak caused a failure on his Mercedes engine. The race result meant Ricciardo moved from thirteenth to fourteenth in the WDC.

The MCL36 featured a special livery for the Singapore Grand Prix (see § Liveries). McLaren also delivered a substantial upgrade, designed to deliver performance in a conceptually new way, partly in preparation for 2023. The package was initially given only to Norris due to a shortage of parts. Aerodynamically, the upgrade included new radiator inlet and floor designs, and again shifted the sidepod design closer to that of the RB18. Internal packaging of the radiators, cooling systems, electronics, and side impact spars was also rearranged. Norris finished in fourth and Ricciardo in fifth, having qualified in sixth and sixteenth respectively; this result took fourth place in the WCC from Alpine, while Ricciardo moved up to eleventh in the WDC.

The car again featured the special livery for the Japanese Grand Prix (see § Liveries). The upgrades introduced to Norris's car in Singapore were added to Ricciardo's MCL36. Norris qualified in tenth and Ricciardo in eleventh, and both finished in those same places in the race, which was shortened by heavy rain. The team lost fourth place to Alpine in the WCC, and Ricciardo fell to twelfth in the WDC.

2021 IndyCar champion Álex Palou replaced Ricciardo for the first practice session at the United States Grand Prix, fulfilling the first of two mandatory rookie practice sessions. Both Ricciardo and Norris took part in Pirelli's 2023 tyre test in the second practice session. Norris qualified eighth and Ricciardo qualified seventeenth, but penalties for other drivers promoted Norris to sixth and Ricciardo to sixteenth. During the race, Norris's car was struck by debris from a separate incident; after the safety car ended he pitted from ninth place and rejoined the track thirteenth, but finished sixth. Ricciardo finished sixteenth.

McLaren added several track-specific features to the MCL36 at the Mexico City Grand Prix, namely an extensive cooling package and extra winglets on the rear brake ducts to improve downforce. Norris qualified eighth, and Ricciardo qualified eleventh. Ricciardo collided with Yuki Tsunoda and was issued with a ten-second penalty. However, Ricciardo was one of few drivers who used a medium to soft tyre strategy, and the additional pace this provided allowed him to finish seventh, even after his penalty was applied. Norris, who was on the medium to hard strategy, finished ninth.

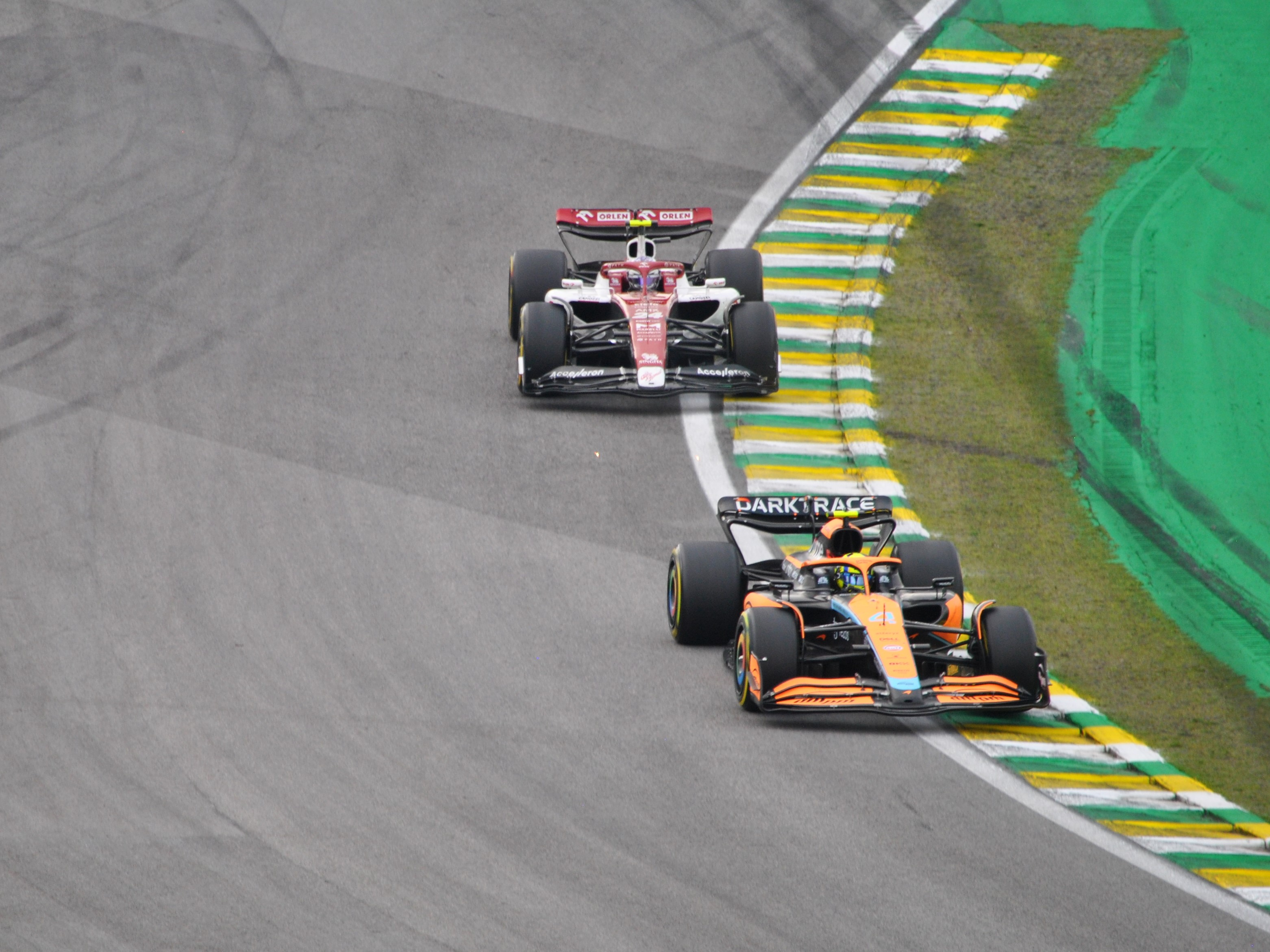
Norris ahead of Zhou Guanyu at the São Paulo Grand Prix. He retired from the race with electrical issues.

Norris fell ill before the São Paulo Grand Prix, prompting McLaren to prepare Nyck de Vries as a replacement. Norris was however able to participate in the weekend, qualifying fourth for the final sprint of the season, while Ricciardo qualified fourteenth. Norris finished seventh in the sprint, but started the race sixth after penalties for other drivers, while Ricciardo finished eleventh. Ricciardo collided with Kevin Magnussen on the opening lap, which caused both to retire from the race and for Ricciardo to be awarded a three-place grid penalty for the next race. The incident also required a safety car, and after the restart Norris collided with Leclerc. Although both continued the race, Norris was awarded a five-second time penalty, although he also retired from the race with electrical issues. McLaren lost fourth to Alpine in the WCC.

The car featured a second special livery for the Abu Dhabi Grand Prix (see § Liveries). Arrow McLaren SP IndyCar driver Pato O'Ward replaced Norris for the first practice session, fulfilling the second of the two mandatory rookie practice sessions. The team tested a new floor as part of the development program for their 2023 car during free practice. Norris qualified seventh and Ricciardo qualified tenth, but the latter was demoted to thirteenth on the starting grid due to his penalty from the previous race. Norris finished sixth and set the fastest lap of the race, and Ricciardo finished ninth. McLaren finished the season fifth in the WCC, while Norris finished seventh and Ricciardo eleventh in the WDC.

The MCL36 remained at Yas Marina Circuit following the Abu Dhabi Grand Prix to be used in the annual post-season test. Oscar Piastri, who replaced Ricciardo for 2023, participated in the test after Alpine agreed to release Piastri from his contract early. Piastri drove the car as run in the season and completed 123 laps, while Norris tested the 2023 Pirelli compounds over 115 laps.

== Assessment and characteristics ==
Both drivers stated that the MCL36 did not suit their driving style or provide the characteristics they thought desirable in a racing car. Norris said that braking and cornering could be inconsistent, even from corner to corner and that the car did not perform consistently across different circuits. This inconsistency was primarily attributed to an aerodynamically weak front end, particularly noticeable in slow-speed corners. Mark Hughes said that the MCL36 "lacked entry stability but could still suffer mid-corner understeer". The car did have sufficient pace to challenge the Alpine A522 for fourth place in the WCC, but ultimately lost, a result partly attributed to Ricciardo's persistent struggles with McLaren cars.

The MCL36 did appear to be aerodynamically efficient at tracks with lower downforce requirements and experienced very little porpoising. During set-up, there was typically a trade-off between high downforce and balance, with balance being sacrificed to achieve better laptimes with higher downforce settings. The car generally seemed competitive over a single lap in qualifying, but suffered over the course of a full race distance. This was largely credited to the car's effectiveness in heating the Pirelli tyres to their operating window, tempered by its difficulty to preserve them over longer distances. Key said he "could write a book" on the MCL36's tyre difficulties, which largely arose because the front tyres were heated very quickly: a useful trait in qualifying, it meant they degraded quickly over a race distance and complicated set-up.

The car suffered only five retirements over the course of the season, completing 91.96% of the scheduled distance, making it the third most reliable car in the 2022 season.

McLaren Racing CEO Zak Brown later stated that the disappointing French Grand Prix upgrade package would serve as catalyst for restructuring McLaren's technical team in 2023, which produced a major in-season overhaul of the MCL60 and returned McLaren to competitive form.

== Later use ==
The MCL36 was run in private tests at Circuit Paul Ricard by McLaren in February 2024, driven by Piastri and 2024 reserve driver Ryō Hirakawa. Later the same month, the MCL36 was tested at the Circuit de Barcelona-Catalunya by Norris, Piastri, and McLaren test drivers Will Stevens and Oliver Turvey. In March, the car was tested at the Imola Circuit by Piastri and Hirakawa. In September, it was run at the Red Bull Ring in a private test for Gabriel Bortoleto, a McLaren development driver competing in Formula 2. Later the same month, McLaren ran a multi-day test at Silverstone in which Brown drove an MCL35M and O'Ward drove an MCL36. Hirakawa and former AlphaTauri driver Nyck de Vries tested the car at Circuit Paul Ricard in November.

== Complete Formula One results ==
Key

Key
| Colour | Result |
|---|---|
| Gold | Winner |
| Silver | Second place |
| Bronze | Third place |
| Green | Other points position |
| Blue | Other classified position |
| Blue | Not classified, finished (NC) |
| Purple | Not classified, retired (Ret) |
| Red | Did not qualify (DNQ) |
| Black | Disqualified (DSQ) |
| White | Did not start (DNS) |
| White | Race cancelled (C) |
| Blank | Did not practice (DNP) |
| Blank | Excluded (EX) |
| Blank | Did not arrive (DNA) |
| Blank | Withdrawn (WD) |
| Blank | Did not enter (empty cell) |
| Annotation | Meaning |
| P | Pole position |
| F | Fastest lap |
| Superscript number | Points-scoring position in sprint |

| Year | Entrant | Power unit | Tyres | Drivers | Grands Prix | | | | | | | | | | | | | | | | | | | | | | Points | WCC |
| Year | Entrant | Power unit | Tyres | Drivers | BHR | SAU | AUS | EMI | MIA | ESP | MON | AZE | CAN | GBR | AUT | FRA | HUN | BEL | NED | ITA | SIN | JPN | USA | MXC | SAP | ABU | Points | WCC |
|---|---|---|---|---|---|---|---|---|---|---|---|---|---|---|---|---|---|---|---|---|---|---|---|---|---|---|---|---|
| 2022 | McLaren F1 Team | Mercedes-AMG; F1 M13 E Performance; 1.6 V6 t | P | (United Kingdom) Lando Norris | 15 | 7 | 5 | 3^{5} | Ret | 8 | 6^{F} | 9 | 15 | 6 | 7 | 7 | 7 | 12 | 7 | 7 | 4 | 10 | 6 | 9 | Ret^{7} | 6^{F} | 159 | 5th |
| 2022 | McLaren F1 Team | Mercedes-AMG; F1 M13 E Performance; 1.6 V6 t | P | (Australia) Daniel Ricciardo | 14 | Ret | 6 | 18^{6} | 13 | 12 | 13 | 8 | 11 | 13 | 9 | 9 | 15 | 15 | 17 | Ret | 5 | 11 | 16 | 7 | Ret | 9 | 159 | 5th |
