= 2020 Tuscan Grand Prix =

Formula One race

Race 9 of 17 (Note: The outbreak of the COVID-19 pandemic saw several Grands Prix cancelled or rescheduled. The revised calendar consisted of seventeen races.) in the 2020 Formula One World Championship
← Previous race	Next race →

Race details
- Date: 13 September 2020
- Official name: Formula 1 Pirelli Gran Premio della Toscana Ferrari 1000 2020
- Location: Autodromo Internazionale del Mugello; Scarperia e San Piero, Tuscany, Italy
- Course: Permanent racing facility
- Course length: 5.245 km (3.259 miles)
- Distance: 59 laps, 309.497 km (192.313 miles)
- Weather: Sunny
- Attendance: 1,500

Pole position
Driver	(United Kingdom) Lewis Hamilton	Mercedes
- Time: 1:15.144

Fastest lap
Driver	(United Kingdom) Lewis Hamilton	Mercedes
- Time: 1:18.833 on lap 58 (lap record)

Podium
First	(United Kingdom) Lewis Hamilton	Mercedes
Second	(Finland) Valtteri Bottas	Mercedes
Third	(Thailand) Alexander Albon	Red Bull Racing-Honda

The 2020 Tuscan Grand Prix (officially known as the Formula 1 Pirelli Gran Premio della Toscana Ferrari 1000 2020) was a Formula One motor race held on 13 September 2020 at the Autodromo Internazionale del Mugello in Scarperia e San Piero, Tuscany, Italy. The race was the ninth round of the 2020 Formula One World Championship and the first race of the season with spectators. As of 2026, this is the only Tuscan Grand Prix to be held and also the only Formula One race to be held at the Mugello circuit.

The race was won by Lewis Hamilton of the Mercedes team, with teammate Valtteri Bottas in second; Mercedes scored their third 1–2 finish of the season. Alexander Albon of Red Bull Racing-Honda scored his first podium in Formula One with a third-place finish, becoming the first Thai driver to do so. Albon also become the first Asian driver outside Japan to achieve a podium finish.

The race was the first since the 2016 Brazilian Grand Prix to have two red flags. Due to the two stoppages, the race had three standing starts.

== Background ==
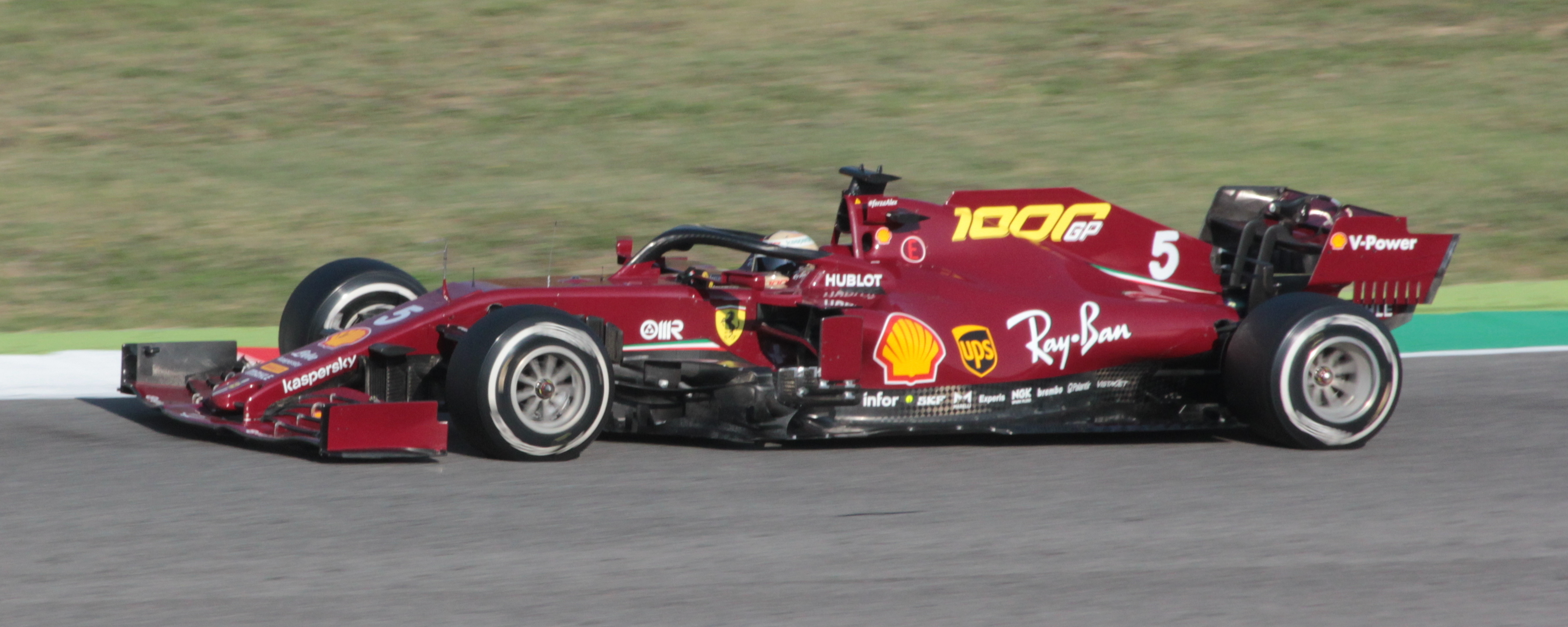
Ferrari's self-identified 1000th Grand Prix with special helmets, and a dark burgundy livery

The race was held as an event celebrating Ferrari's 1000th race in the Formula One World Championship and the safety car used a red livery, instead of its usual silver colour, to mark the occasion. The Mugello Circuit hosted a World Championship Formula One race for the first time. The Ferrari SF1000 sported a special livery: instead of the traditional rosso corsa, the car was painted dark burgundy. Both Sebastian Vettel and Charles Leclerc wore special racing overalls, and both had special helmet designs.

=== Impact of the COVID-19 pandemic ===
The 2020 championship was heavily affected by the COVID-19 pandemic. Most of the originally scheduled Grands Prix were cancelled or postponed, prompting the Fédération Internationale de l'Automobile to draft a new calendar. While the previous eight events were held behind closed doors, organisers announced that up to 2,880 spectators would be allowed for the Tuscan Grand Prix.

=== Entrants ===
Ten teams (each representing a different constructor) each entered two drivers. The drivers and teams were the same as those on the season entry list with no additional stand-in drivers for either the race or practice.

=== Tyres ===
Sole Formula One tyre manufacturer Pirelli brought the C1, C2, and C3 compound tyres for teams to use in the race, the three hardest compounds available.

== Qualifying ==
=== Qualifying classification ===
Pos.	No.	Driver	Constructor	Qualifying times			Final grid
Pos.	No.	Driver	Constructor	Q1	Q2	Q3	Final grid
1	44	(United Kingdom) Lewis Hamilton	Mercedes	1:15.778	1:15.309	1:15.144	1
2	77	(Finland) Valtteri Bottas	Mercedes	1:15.749	1:15.322	1:15.203	2
3	33	(Netherlands) Max Verstappen	Red Bull Racing-Honda	1:16.335	1:15.471	1:15.509	3
4	23	(Thailand) Alexander Albon	Red Bull Racing-Honda	1:16.527	1:15.914	1:15.954	4
5	16	(Monaco) Charles Leclerc	Ferrari	1:16.698	1:16.324	1:16.270	5
6	11	(Mexico) Sergio Pérez	Racing Point-BWT Mercedes	1:16.596	1:16.489	1:16.311	7^{a}
7	18	(Canada) Lance Stroll	Racing Point-BWT Mercedes	1:16.701	1:16.271	1:16.356	6
8	3	(Australia) Daniel Ricciardo	Renault	1:16.981	1:16.243	1:16.543	8
9	55	(Spain) Carlos Sainz Jr.	McLaren-Renault	1:16.993	1:16.522	1:17.870	9
10	31	(France) Esteban Ocon	Renault	1:16.825	1:16.297	No time	10
11	4	(United Kingdom) Lando Norris	McLaren-Renault	1:16.895	1:16.640	N/A	11
12	26	(Russia) Daniil Kvyat	AlphaTauri-Honda	1:16.928	1:16.854^{b}	N/A	12
13	7	(Finland) Kimi Räikkönen	Alfa Romeo Racing-Ferrari	1:17.059	1:16.854^{b}	N/A	13
14	5	(Germany) Sebastian Vettel	Ferrari	1:17.072	1:16.858	N/A	14
15	8	(France) Romain Grosjean	Haas-Ferrari	1:17.069	1:17.254	N/A	15
16	10	(France) Pierre Gasly	AlphaTauri-Honda	1:17.125	N/A	N/A	16
17	99	(Italy) Antonio Giovinazzi	Alfa Romeo Racing-Ferrari	1:17.220	N/A	N/A	17
18	63	(United Kingdom) George Russell	Williams-Mercedes	1:17.232	N/A	N/A	18
19	6	(Canada) Nicholas Latifi	Williams-Mercedes	1:17.320	N/A	N/A	19
20	20	(Denmark) Kevin Magnussen	Haas-Ferrari	1:17.348	N/A	N/A	20
107% time: 1:21.051

- ^a – Sergio Pérez received a one-place grid penalty for causing a collision with Kimi Räikkönen during the second practice session.
- ^b – Daniil Kvyat and Kimi Räikkönen set identical times in Q2; Kvyat was classified ahead as he set his lap time before Räikkönen.

== Race ==
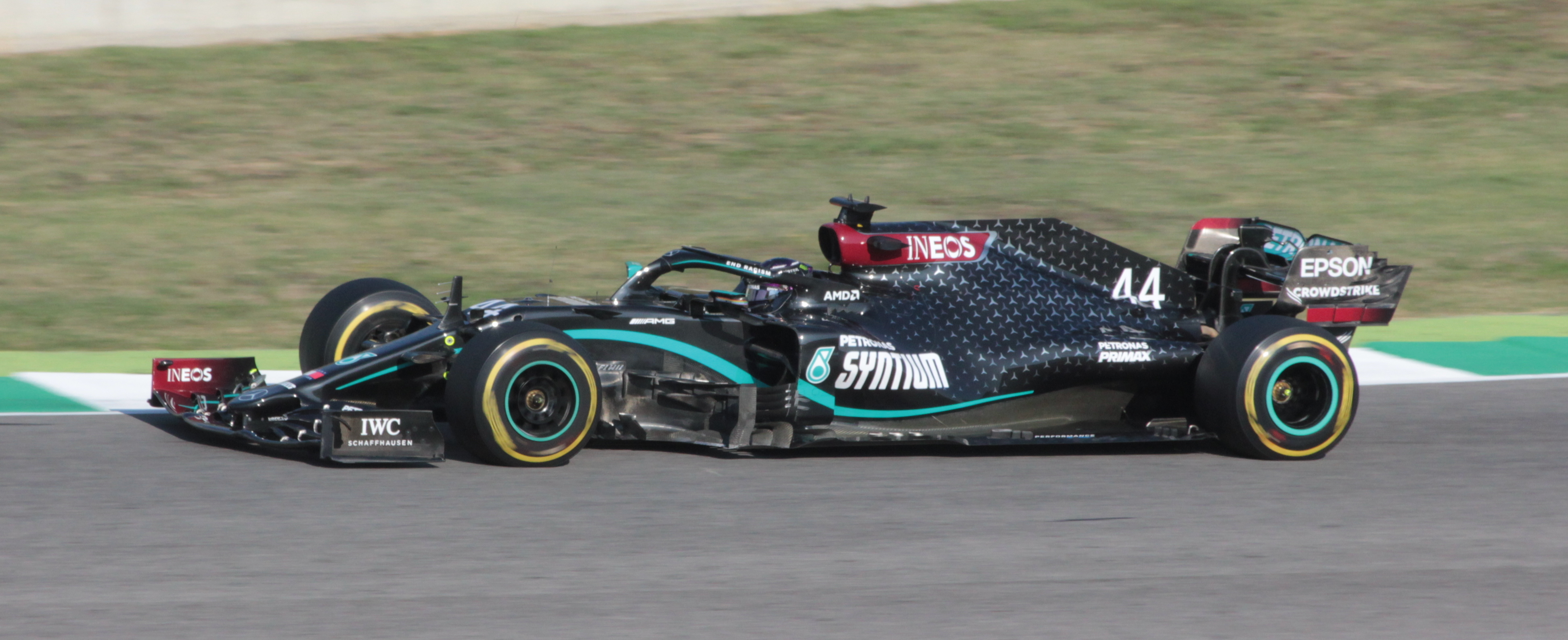
Race winner Lewis Hamilton on Mercedes

The race was marked by several incidents. On the first lap at turn 2, Max Verstappen, Pierre Gasly, Kimi Räikkönen, and Romain Grosjean collided, resulting in Gasly and Verstappen retiring from the race and Räikkönen having to change his front wing. Verstappen's car was beached in the gravel trap. A separate incident at the same corner involved Carlos Sainz Jr. and Lance Stroll, as Sainz spun round and damaged Sebastian Vettel's front wing. These incidents together brought out the safety car. On lap 6 the safety car pulled in, but an accordion effect saw the midfield drivers accelerating up to racing speed before the leaders did and then being forced to brake, triggering a collision involving Sainz, Kevin Magnussen, Antonio Giovinazzi, and Nicholas Latifi. Grosjean blamed the leader, Valtteri Bottas, for causing the accordion effect, and stated "this is the worst thing I've seen ever". All four drivers retired from the race and the red flag was brought out. During the red flag period, Esteban Ocon retired due to a brake failure; George Russell had earlier reported Ocon's brakes being on fire. The second red flag came on lap 45, after Stroll suffered a tyre failure at lap 43 turn 9, and went into the barrier. His Racing Point RP20 caught fire, making it harder for the marshalls to clear the track.

Lewis Hamilton won the race, his 90th career win. Valtteri Bottas came in second and Alex Albon finished third, his first career podium. By finishing in ninth place, Kimi Räikkönen scored his first points of the season. A poor restart after the second red flag meant George Russell slipped from ninth to twelfth and last. He eventually finished eleventh leaving him out of the points. Twelve drivers were warned by the FIA for their part in the accident at the restart on lap 6.

=== Race classification ===
Pos.	No.	Driver	Constructor	Laps	Time/Retired	Grid	Points
1	44	(United Kingdom) Lewis Hamilton	Mercedes	59	2:19:35.060	1	26^{1}
2	77	(Finland) Valtteri Bottas	Mercedes	59	+4.880	2	18
3	23	(Thailand) Alexander Albon	Red Bull Racing-Honda	59	+8.064	4	15
4	3	(Australia) Daniel Ricciardo	Renault	59	+10.417	8	12
5	11	(Mexico) Sergio Pérez	Racing Point-BWT Mercedes	59	+15.650	7	10
6	4	(United Kingdom) Lando Norris	McLaren-Renault	59	+18.883	11	8
7	26	(Russia) Daniil Kvyat	AlphaTauri-Honda	59	+21.756	12	6
8	16	(Monaco) Charles Leclerc	Ferrari	59	+28.345	5	4
9	7	(Finland) Kimi Räikkönen	Alfa Romeo Racing-Ferrari	59	+29.770^{2}	13	2
10	5	(Germany) Sebastian Vettel	Ferrari	59	+29.983	14	1
11	63	(United Kingdom) George Russell	Williams-Mercedes	59	+32.404	18	
12	8	(France) Romain Grosjean	Haas-Ferrari	59	+42.036	15	
Ret	18	(Canada) Lance Stroll	Racing Point-BWT Mercedes	42	Tyre/Accident	6	
Ret	31	(France) Esteban Ocon	Renault	7	Brakes	10	
Ret	6	(Canada) Nicholas Latifi	Williams-Mercedes	6	Collision damage	19	
Ret	20	(Denmark) Kevin Magnussen	Haas-Ferrari	5	Collision	20	
Ret	99	(Italy) Antonio Giovinazzi	Alfa Romeo Racing-Ferrari	5	Collision	17	
Ret	55	(Spain) Carlos Sainz Jr.	McLaren-Renault	5	Collision	9	
Ret	33	(Netherlands) Max Verstappen	Red Bull Racing-Honda	0	Collision	3	
Ret	10	(France) Pierre Gasly	AlphaTauri-Honda	0	Collision	16	
Fastest lap: (United Kingdom) Lewis Hamilton (Mercedes) – 1:18.833 (lap 58)

Notes

- ^1 – Includes one point for fastest lap.
- ^2 – Kimi Räikkönen finished eighth on the track, but received a five-second time penalty for crossing the pit entry line.

== Championship standings after the race ==
Drivers' Championship standings

	Pos.	Driver	Points
	1	(United Kingdom) Lewis Hamilton	190
	2	(Finland) Valtteri Bottas	135
	3	(Netherlands) Max Verstappen	110
1	4	(United Kingdom) Lando Norris	65
1	5	(Thailand) Alexander Albon	63

Constructors' Championship standings

Pos.	Constructor	Points
1	(Germany) Mercedes	325
2	(Austria) Red Bull Racing-Honda	173
3	(United Kingdom) McLaren-Renault	106
4	(United Kingdom) Racing Point-BWT Mercedes	92 (Note: Racing Point was deducted 15 points after a protest from Renault was upheld regarding the legality of their car.)
5	(France) Renault	83

- Note: Only the top five positions are included for both sets of standings.

== See also ==
- 2020 Mugello Formula 2 round
- 2020 Mugello Formula 3 round

== Notes ==
Previous race: 2020 Italian Grand Prix	FIA Formula One World Championship; 2020 season	Next race: 2020 Russian Grand Prix
Previous race: N/A	Tuscan Grand Prix	Next race: N/A
