= Accordion effect =

Nonlinear process in fluid dynamics

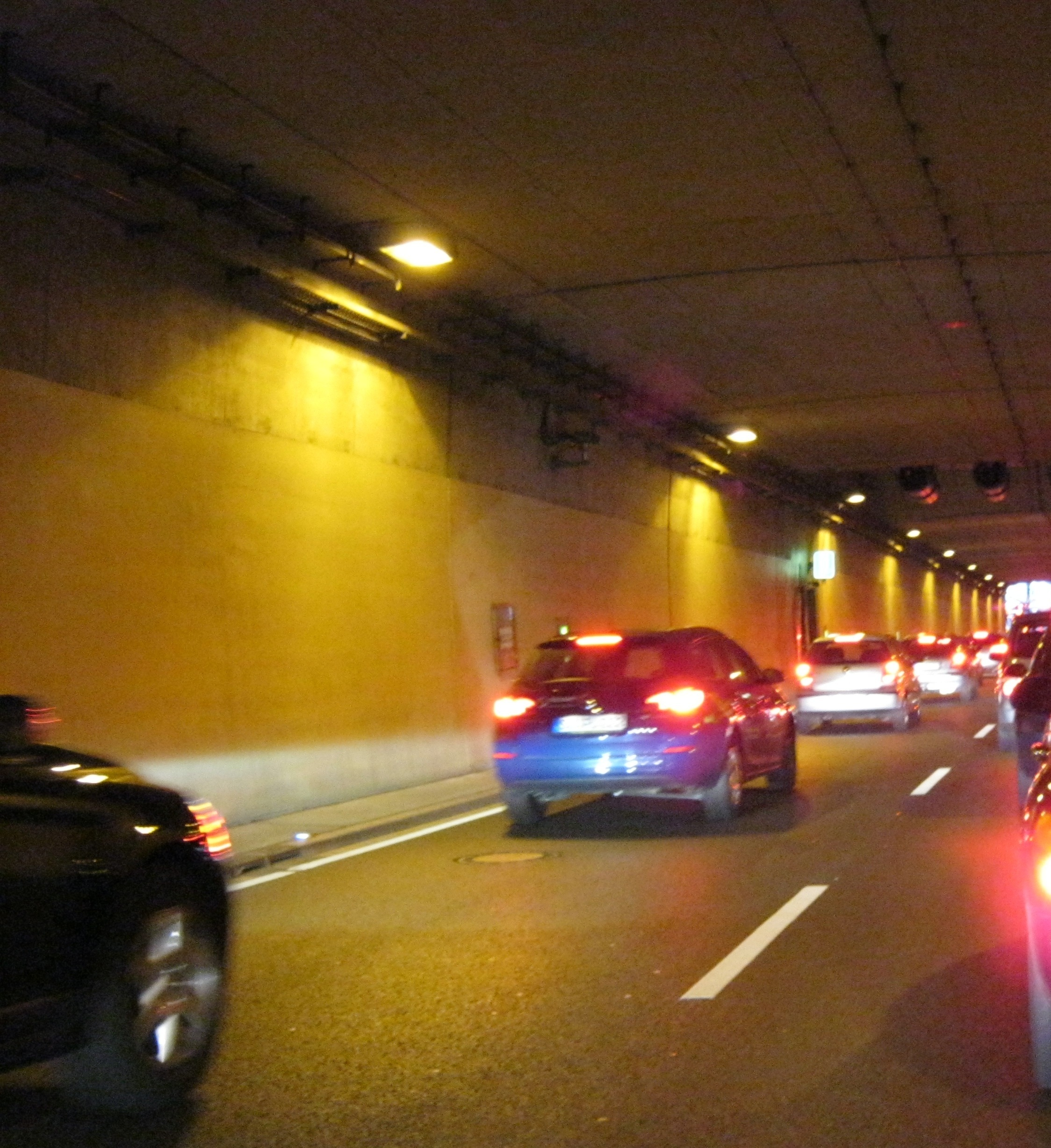
A moving line of cars, a situation susceptible to the accordion effect.

In physics, the accordion effect (also known as the slinky effect, concertina effect, elastic band effect, and string instability) occurs when fluctuations in the motion of a traveling body cause disruptions in the flow of elements following it. This can happen in road traffic, foot marching, bicycle and motor racing, and, in general, to processes in a pipeline. These are examples of nonlinear processes. The accordion effect generally decreases the throughput of the system in which it occurs.

== In traffic ==
The accordion effect in road traffic refers to the typical decelerations and accelerations of a vehicle when the vehicle in front decelerates and accelerates. These fluctuations in speed propagate backwards and typically get bigger and bigger further down the line, resulting in reduced throughput of road traffic. For this reason, the Norwegian Public Roads Administration recommends that each driver should try to follow the accelerations of the vehicle in front closely, and keeping a steady gap that is neither too small or large. Too small gaps and sudden braking can lead to rear ending.

== In motorsports ==
In the 2020 Tuscan Grand Prix, an accordion effect after the restart under the safety car caused five of the last cars in the field to crash. Data analysis of the crash showed that each consecutive driver accelerated faster and faster, and also that each consecutive driver braked later and later.

== See also ==
- Bus bunching
- Wavelength
- Doppler effect
- Traffic wave
