= Spa-Francorchamps GP2 round =

(Belgium) Spa-Francorchamps GP2 round

GP2 Series
- Venue: Circuit de Spa-Francorchamps
- Location: Stavelot, Belgium
- First race: 2005
- Last race: 2016
- Most wins (driver): (Venezuela) Pastor Maldonado (2)
- Most wins (team): (France) ART Grand Prix (Spain) Racing Engineering (3)
- Lap record: 1:56.731 ( (Mexico) Sergio Pérez, Arden International, GP2/08, 2009)

2005 (Note: Older layout of the Circuit de Spa-Francorchamps, which held GP2 race in 2005.)
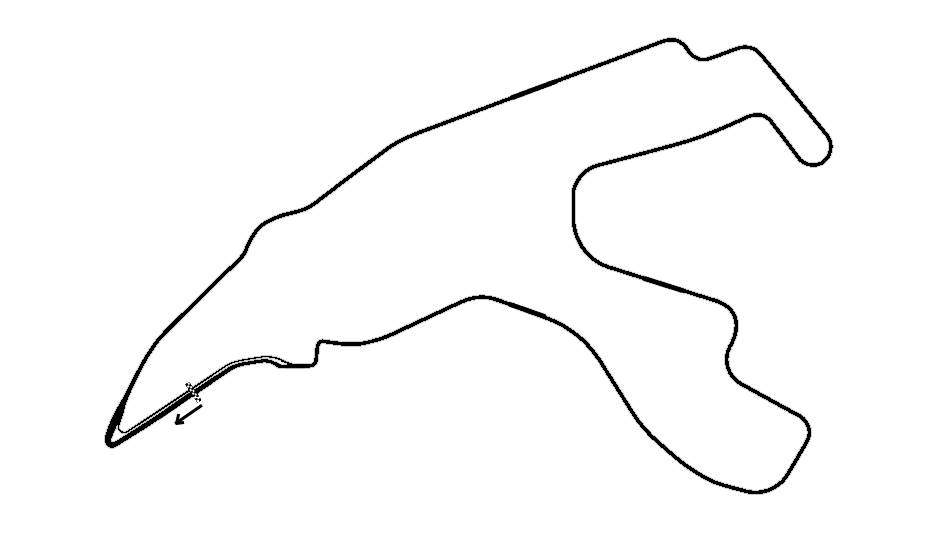
- Lap record: 2:07.563 ( (France) Alexandre Prémat, ART Grand Prix, GP2/05, 2005)

The Spa-Francorchamps GP2 round was a GP2 Series race that ran from on the Circuit de Spa-Francorchamps track in Stavelot, Belgium.

== Winners ==
Year	Race	Driver	Team	Report
2005	Feature	(Brazil) Nelson Piquet Jr.	Hitech Piquet Sports	Report
2005	Sprint	(United Kingdom) Adam Carroll	Super Nova International	Report
2007	Feature	(France) Nicolas Lapierre	DAMS	Report
2007	Sprint	(India) Karun Chandhok	Durango	Report
2008	Feature	(France) Romain Grosjean	ART Grand Prix	Report
2008	Sprint	(Venezuela) Pastor Maldonado	Piquet Sports	Report
2009	Feature	(Portugal) Álvaro Parente	Ocean Racing Technology	Report
2009	Sprint	(Netherlands) Giedo van der Garde	iSport International	Report
2010	Feature	(Venezuela) Pastor Maldonado	Rapax	Report
2010	Sprint	(Mexico) Sergio Pérez	Barwa Addax Team	Report
2011	Feature	(Germany) Christian Vietoris	Racing Engineering	Report
2011	Sprint	(Italy) Luca Filippi	Scuderia Coloni	Report
2012	Feature	(Sweden) Marcus Ericsson	iSport International	Report
2012	Sprint	(Czech Republic) Josef Král	Barwa Addax Team	Report
2013	Feature	(United Kingdom) Sam Bird	Russian Time	Report
2013	Sprint	(United Kingdom) James Calado	ART Grand Prix	Report
2014	Feature	(Italy) Raffaele Marciello	Racing Engineering	Report
2014	Sprint	(Brazil) Felipe Nasr	Carlin	Report
2015	Feature	(Belgium) Stoffel Vandoorne	ART Grand Prix	Report
2015	Sprint	(United States) Alexander Rossi	Racing Engineering	Report
2016	Feature	(France) Pierre Gasly	Prema Racing	Report
2016	Sprint	(Italy) Antonio Giovinazzi	Prema Racing	Report

== See also ==
- Belgian Grand Prix
- Spa-Francorchamps Formula 2 round
