= Circuit de Spa-Francorchamps =

Motorsport race track near Spa, Belgium

- Grand Prix Circuit (2007–present)
- Location: Stavelot, Belgium
- Coordinates: 50°26′14″N 5°58′17″E
- Capacity: 130,000
- FIA Grade: 1 (GP); 2 (Motorcycle)
- Opened: August 1921; 105 years ago
- Architect: Jules de Thier and Henri Langlois van Ophem
- Major events: Current: Formula One; Belgian Grand Prix (intermittently 1925–1970, 1983–present); Intercontinental GT Challenge; Spa 24 Hours (1924–1934, 1936, 1938, 1948–1949, 1953, 1964–present); FIA World Endurance Championship; 6 Hours of Spa (1953, 1963–1975, 1981–1990, 1999–present); FIM Endurance World Championship; 8 Hours of Spa Motos (1973–2001, 2022–present); European Le Mans Series; 4 Hours of Spa (2004–2011, 2016–present); FFSA GT (1998, 2008, 2013–2015, 2019, 2021–2022, 2024–present); Former: Grand Prix motorcycle racing Belgian motorcycle Grand Prix (1949–1979, 1981–1986, 1988–1990); FIA World Rallycross Championship; World RX of Benelux (2019, 2021–2022); TCR World Tour (2023); WTCC; Race of Belgium (2005, 2014); World SBK (1992); DTM (2005, 2020, 2022)
- Website: www.spa-francorchamps.be/en

Grand Prix Circuit (2007–present)
- Length: 7.004 km (4.352 mi)
- Turns: 19
- Race lap record: 1:44.701 ( (Mexico) Sergio Pérez, Red Bull RB20, 2024, F1)

Motorcycle Circuit (2022–present)
- Length: 6.985 km (4.340 mi)
- Turns: 20
- Race lap record: 2:19.140 ( (France) Sylvain Guintoli, BMW M1000RR, 2025, SBK)

Grand Prix Circuit (2004–2006)
- Length: 6.976 km (4.335 mi)
- Turns: 19
- Race lap record: 1:45.108 ( (Finland) Kimi Räikkönen, McLaren MP4-19B, 2004, F1)

Grand Prix Circuit (1995–2003)
- Length: 6.968 km (4.330 mi)
- Turns: 19
- Race lap record: 1:47.176 ( (Germany) Michael Schumacher, Ferrari F2002, 2002, F1)

Grand Prix Circuit with chicane at Eau Rouge (1994)
- Length: 7.001 km (4.350 mi)
- Turns: 19
- Race lap record: 1:57.117 ( (United Kingdom) Damon Hill, Williams FW16B, 1994, F1)

Grand Prix Circuit (1981–1993)
- Length: 6.940 km (4.312 mi)
- Turns: 19
- Race lap record: 1:51.095 ( (France) Alain Prost, Williams FW15C, 1993, F1)

Grand Prix Circuit (1979–1980)
- Length: 6.947 km (4.317 mi)
- Turns: 17
- Race lap record: 2:48.800 ( (United Kingdom) Gordon Spice, Ford Capri III 3.0S, 1979, Group 1)

Old Circuit (1940–1978)
- Length: 14.100 km (8.761 mi)
- Turns: 21
- Race lap record: 3:13.400 ( (France) Henri Pescarolo, Matra-Simca MS670B, 1973, Group 5)

Pre-war Grand Prix Circuit (1939)
- Length: 14.580 km (9.060 mi)
- Turns: 25
- Race lap record: 5:19.900 ( (Germany) Hermann Lang, Mercedes-Benz W154, 1939, GP)

Pre-war Grand Prix Circuit (1934–1938)
- Length: 14.950 km (9.289 mi)
- Turns: 25
- Race lap record: 5:04.700 ( (Germany) Hermann Lang, Mercedes-Benz W125, 1937, GP)

Pre-war Grand Prix Circuit (1930–1933)
- Length: 14.860 km (9.234 mi)
- Turns: 25
- Race lap record: 6:00.000 ( (Italy) Tazio Nuvolari, Maserati 8CM, 1933, GP)

Original Grand Prix Circuit (1934–1938)
- Length: 14.980 km (9.308 mi)
- Turns: 25
- Race lap record: 6:51.200 ( (Italy) Antonio Ascari, Alfa Romeo P2, 1925, GP)

The Circuit de Spa-Francorchamps (French pronunciation: [siʁkɥi də spa fʁɑ̃kɔʁʃɑ̃]), informally referred to as Spa, is a 7.004 km (4.352 mi) motor-racing circuit located in Francorchamps, Stavelot, Wallonia, Belgium, about 8 km (5.0 mi) southeast of Spa. It is the current venue of the Formula One Belgian Grand Prix, hosting its first Grand Prix in 1925, also hosting an F1 race in the first ever F1 season with the 1950 Belgian Grand Prix, and has held a Grand Prix every year since 1985 except 2003 and 2006.

Spa also hosts several other international events including the 24 Hours of Spa and the World Endurance Championship 6 Hours of Spa-Francorchamps. It is also the host of the Uniroyal Fun Cup 25 Hours of Spa, one of the longest motor races in the world.

The circuit has undergone several redesigns through its history, most extensively in 1979 when the track was modified and shortened from a 14.120 km (8.774 mi) circuit using public roads to a 6.947 km (4.317 mi) permanent circuit due to safety concerns with the old circuit.

== Track configurations ==
=== Original layout ===
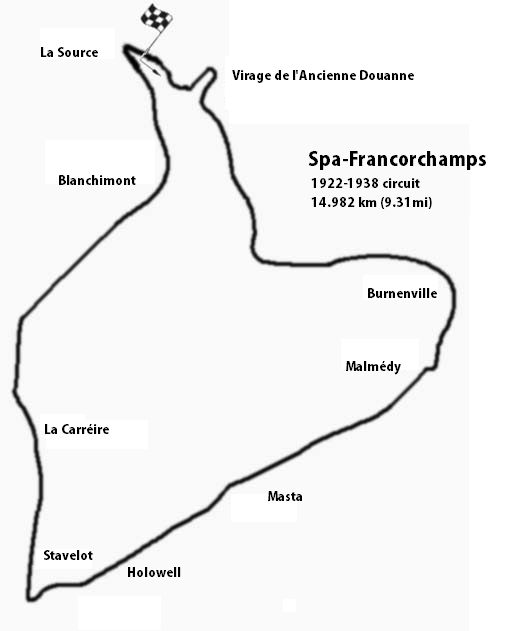
The original 14.982 km (9.309 mi) track layout

In 1918, German headquarters were in Spa, and in 1919, the Treaty of Versailles separated the Eupen-Malmedy region from Prussia and the German Empire. Between January and June 1920, a plebiscite was held, without a secret ballot and under other questionable circumstances. As a result, the Transitional Government prepared for the unification of Eupen-Malmedy with Belgium in June 1925.

Jules de Thier, owner of the Liège newspaper La Meuse, was looking for a site to host a race, and following a meeting at the Hotel des Bruyères in Francorchamps, with burgomaster Joseph de Crawhez and racing-car driver Henri Langlois van Ophem, it was decided that the roads from Spa-Francorchamps to the former German Malmedy, to Stavelot, and back towards Francorchamps constituted an ideal triangle-shaped circuit with few tight corners and long fast sections. Eau Rouge creek was the Belgian-German Empire border until 1920, after which date the border post became known as the Ancienne Douane, 'former customs office'. After passing through former German Bürnenville, the track crossed the former border again halfway on the road between Malmedy and Stavelot, at the junction of the Meiz road. In Stavelot, there was a sharp right-hander, later replaced with a sweeping bypass.

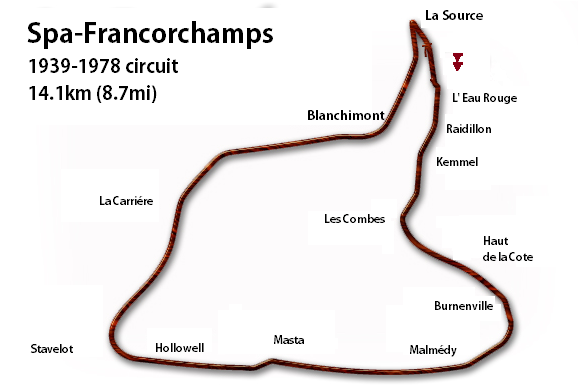
The quicker 14.100 km (8.761 mi) track layout used from 1958–1978

The track's inaugural race was planned for August 1921, but was cancelled when only one driver entered. The first car race was held at the circuit in 1922, and 1924 saw the first running of the now famous 24 Hours of Francorchamps race. The circuit was first used for Grand Prix racing in 1925.

The original Spa-Francorchamps circuit was essentially a speed course, with drivers managing higher average speeds than on other road race tracks. At the time, the Belgians took pride in having a very fast circuit, and to improve average speeds, in 1939 the former Ancienne Douane slow uphill U-turn after the bottom of the Eau Rouge creek valley was cut short with a faster sweep straight up the hill, called the Raidillon. In public traffic until 2000, at Eau Rouge, southbound traffic was allowed to use the famous uphill corner, while the opposite downhill traffic had to use the old road and U-turn behind the grandstands, rejoining the race track at the bottom of Eau Rouge. Around 2001, a new bypass road N62c was built to the East, and the track was closed to the public as the road from Stavelot to Blanchimont became a cul-de-sac.

The old race track continued through the Kemmel curves (straightened in 1979) to the highest part of the track (102.2 m (335 ft) above the lowest part), then went downhill into Les Combes, a fast, slightly banked downhill left-hand corner towards Burnenville, passing this village in a fast right hand sweep. Near Malmedy, the Masta straight began, which was only interrupted by the Masta Kink between farm houses before arriving at the town of Stavelot. Then, the track progressed through an uphill straight section with a few bends called La Carriere, going through two high-speed turns (the former being an unnamed right-hand turn, and the latter named Blanchimont) before braking very hard for La Source hairpin, that rejoined the downhill start finish section (as opposed to today where the start–finish section is before La Source).

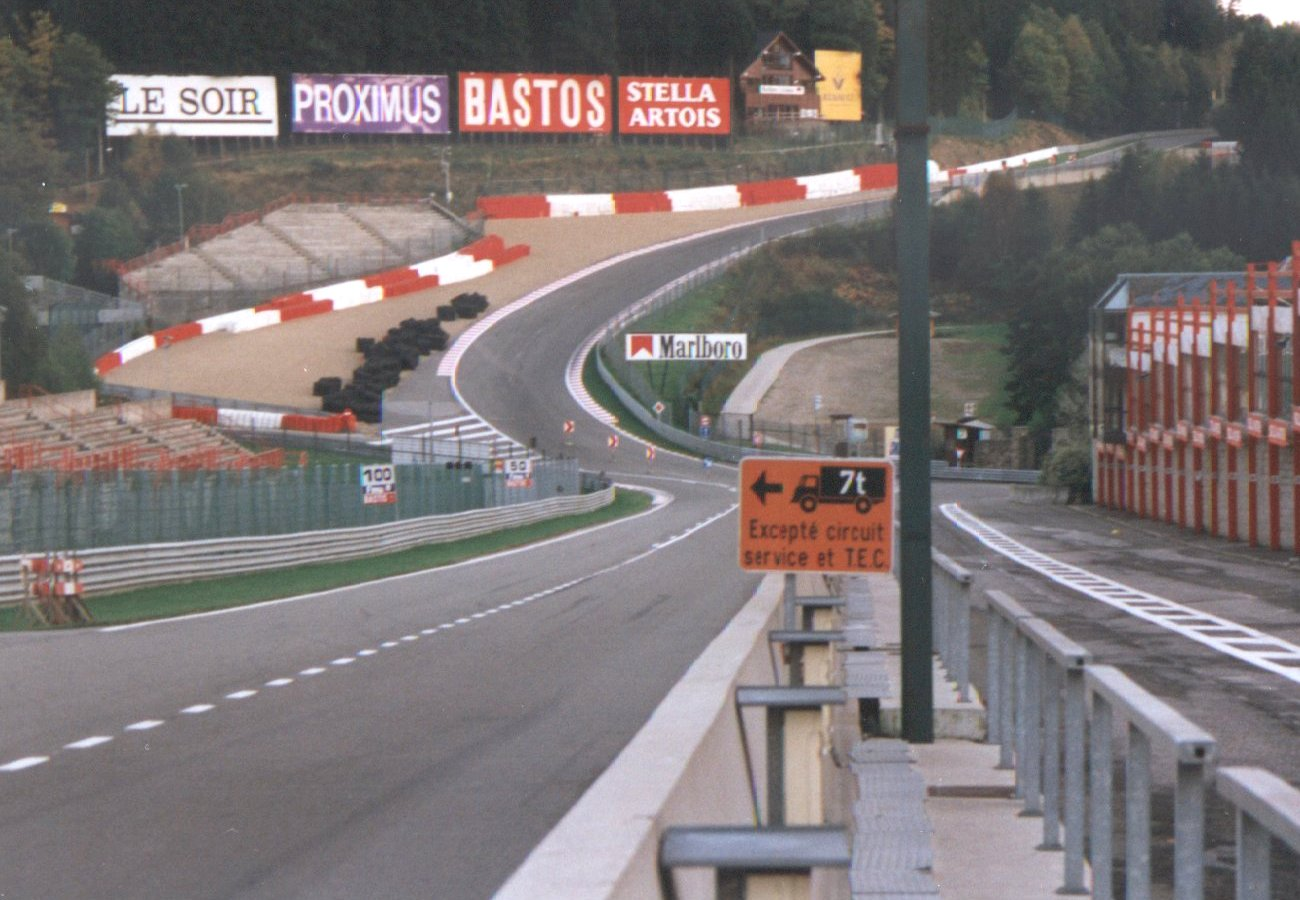
Eau Rouge and Raidillon in 1997, with a maximum gradient in excess of 18%

Spa is located in the Belgian Ardennes countryside, and the long old circuit was, and for most parts still is, used as an everyday public road, and there were houses, trees, electric poles, fields and other obstacles located right next to the track. Before 1970, there were no safety modifications of any kind done to the circuit and the conditions of the circuit were, aside from a few straw bales, virtually identical to everyday civilian use. Former Formula One racing driver and team owner Jackie Oliver was quoted as saying "if you went off the road, you didn't know what you were going to hit".

Before the 1979 changes, Spa-Francorchamps was the fastest road circuit in Europe, and it had a reputation for being dangerous and very fast – it demanded calmness from drivers, and most were frightened of it. The former Spa circuit was distinguished by its sustained high-speed characteristics, wherein drivers experienced little to no reduction in velocity throughout a lap duration of approximately three to four minutes. This made it an extraordinarily difficult mental challenge, because most of the corners were taken at more than 290 km/h (180 mph) and were not quite flat – every corner was as important as the one before it. If a driver lifted the throttle more than expected, then whole seconds, not tenths, would be lost. The slightest error of any kind carried multiple harsh consequences, but this also worked inversely: huge advantages could be gained if a driver came out of a corner slightly faster.

Like the Le Mans circuit, which also ran on public roads, Spa became notorious for fatal accidents. At the 1960 Belgian Grand Prix, two drivers, Chris Bristow and Alan Stacey, were killed within 15 minutes (although Stacey's accident was caused by a bird hitting him in the face) and Stirling Moss had crashed at Burnenville during practice and was severely injured. When Armco crash barriers were added to the track in 1970, deaths became less frequent, but the track was still notorious for other factors. The Ardennes forest had very unpredictable weather, to the point that some areas were experiencing heavy rains while others had clear skies. This factor was a commonality on long circuits, but the unpredictable weather at Spa, combined with the fact that it was a track with all but one corner being high-speed, made it one of, if not the most, dangerous race track in the world. As a result, the Formula 1 and motorcycle Grands Prix and 1000 km sportscar races saw smaller than usual fields at Spa because most drivers and riders feared the circuit and did not like racing there. Multiple fatalities during the 1973 and 1975 24 Hours of Spa touring car races more or less sealed the old circuit's fate, and by 1978, the last year Spa was in its original form, the only major races held there were the Belgian motorcycle Grand Prix and the Spa 24 Hours touring car race; the 1000 km World Sportscar Championship race no longer took place after 1975 and did not come back until 1982.

In 1969, the Belgian Grand Prix was boycotted by Formula One drivers due to the extreme danger. There had been ten car racing fatalities in total at the track in the 1960s, five of which had come in the last two years. The drivers demanded changes made to Spa which were not possible on short notice, so the Belgian Grand Prix was dropped that year. Armco barriers were added to the track and sections of it were improved (especially the Stavelot and Hollowell sections), just like they had been added for the 1969 Le Mans race. One last race there the following year on the improved track was still not satisfactory enough (even after a temporary chicane was added at Malmedy just for that race) for the drivers in terms of safety, and even with the chicane, the drivers averaged over 240 km/h (150 mph) during the race. For the 1971 race, the track owners and authorities had not brought the track up to date with mandatory safety measures, and the race was cancelled. Formula One would not return to Spa until 1983 on the modern track.

==== Masta Kink ====
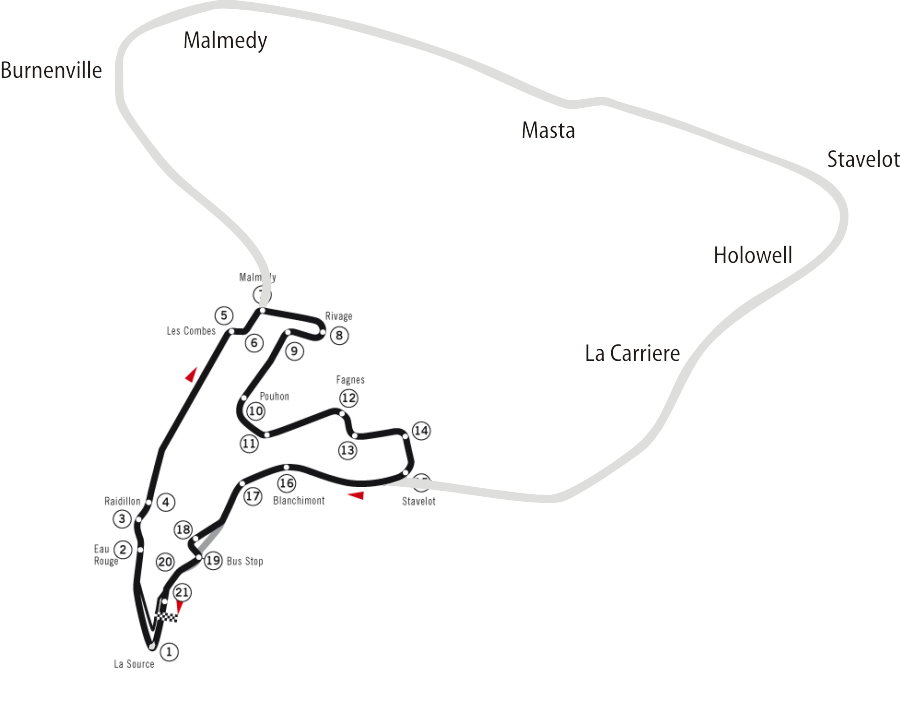
Map of the old and new (2004–2006) Spa circuits, overlaid

The Masta Kink "was by far the most difficult corner in the world", according to Jackie Stewart, who was an F1 driver at the time. After a long run from Malmedy, the cars would reach top speed before having to negotiate Masta, a high speed left-right chicane, and a good exit speed was vital as it was followed by another long straight run to Stavelot. This was a fast and dangerous corner, as it was situated in the middle of two long unbroken straights, both about 1.5 mi (2.4 km) long. The speed in this sector could reach 298 km/h (185 mph).

Masta was removed from F1 racing after the 1970 season. Jackie Stewart's aim to improve safety in racing was set in motion by his crash there in 1966, when his BRM ended upside-down in a ditch near a farmhouse on the outside of the corner, with fuel gushing out of the tank onto Stewart, who had broken ribs. At this point, many of the Formula One drivers disliked Spa (including Stewart and Jim Clark, who had some of his greatest wins there) because of the immense speeds that were constant on the track. While he was spectating at the 1972 12 Hours of Sebring, Stewart attempted to organise a boycott of the Spa 1000 km race that year, a move that was not respected by many of the drivers, because Spa was still popular with racing drivers outside of Formula One. Stewart later described the old Spa circuit in 1986 as being as "ferocious as a tiger", and he later described Masta in an interview in 2011 as perhaps the hardest corner on any racetrack he raced on in his career; even more so than Eau Rouge.

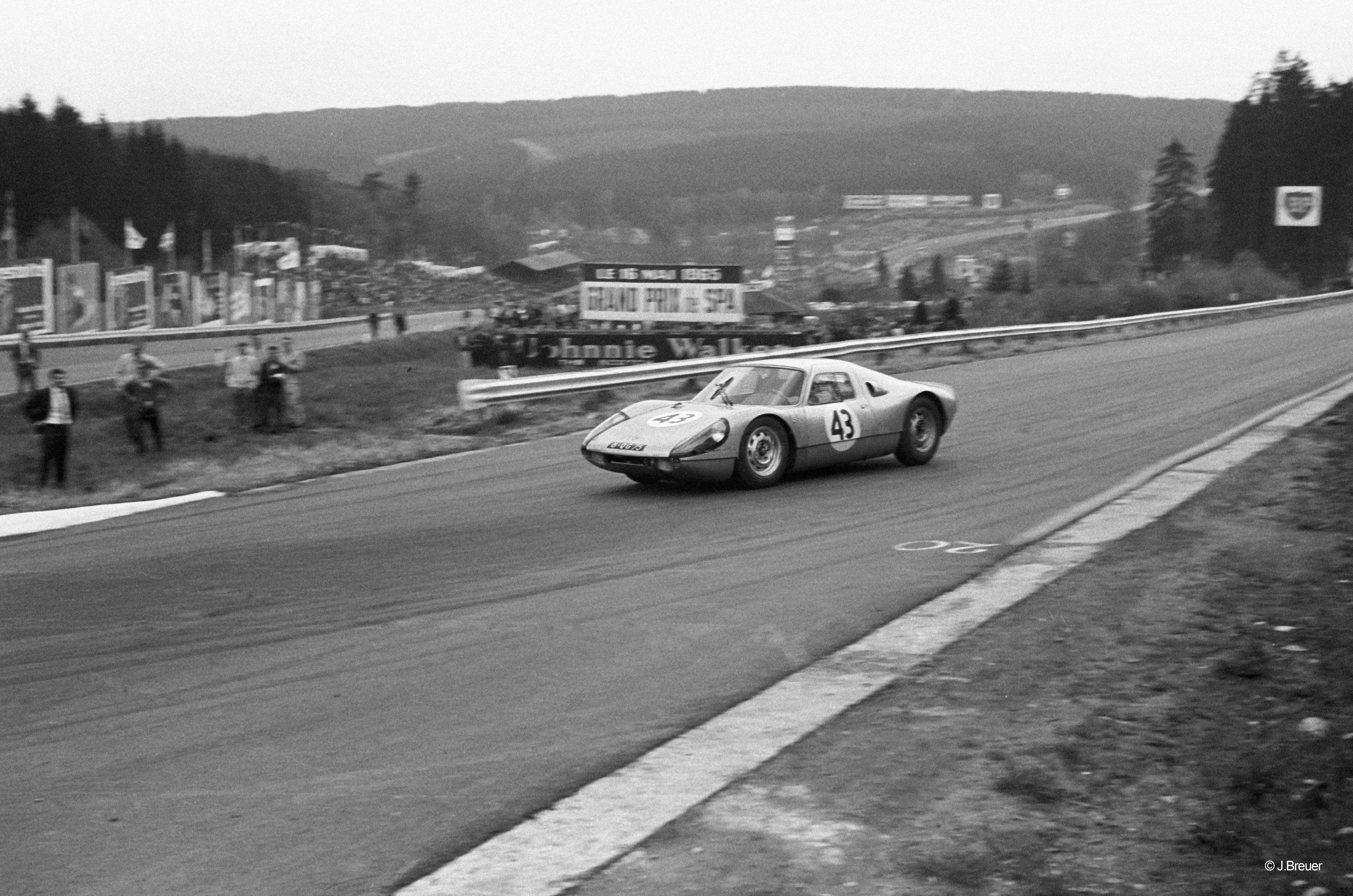
A Porsche 904 GTS turning into La Source in 1965

At the 1972 24-hour touring car race, during one of his pit stops at night, Hans-Joachim Stuck shouted to his co-driver Jochen Mass over the noise from the cars that he should "look out for body parts at the Masta Kink". Mass arrived there expecting to see pieces from cars all over the road, but discovered it was instead the remains of marshal Léon Grisard, who had been run over by Walter Brun whilst inspecting the track.

After Masta, and at the end of the subsequent Hollowell Straight, there used to be a sharp hairpin at the entrance to the town itself, which was later bypassed by a quicker, banked right hand corner. Another fast section of road in the forest leads to Blanchimont. Here, the new short Grand Prix track of 1979 joins the old layout.

Eighteen Formula One World Championship Grands Prix were run on the Spa-Francorchamps circuit's original configuration, which was boycotted by F1 in 1969, before the revised circuit abandoned it in 1979. The lap record of the old triangle-shaped track is 3 minutes and 13.4 seconds, held by the French driver Henri Pescarolo, driving a Matra at the 1973 Spa 1000 km World Sportscar Championship race at an average speed of 262 km/h (163 mph), but the fastest ever recorded time of the old Spa circuit was the pole position time for the same race—3 minutes and 12.7 seconds by Jacky Ickx in a Ferrari 312PB.

=== New layout ===
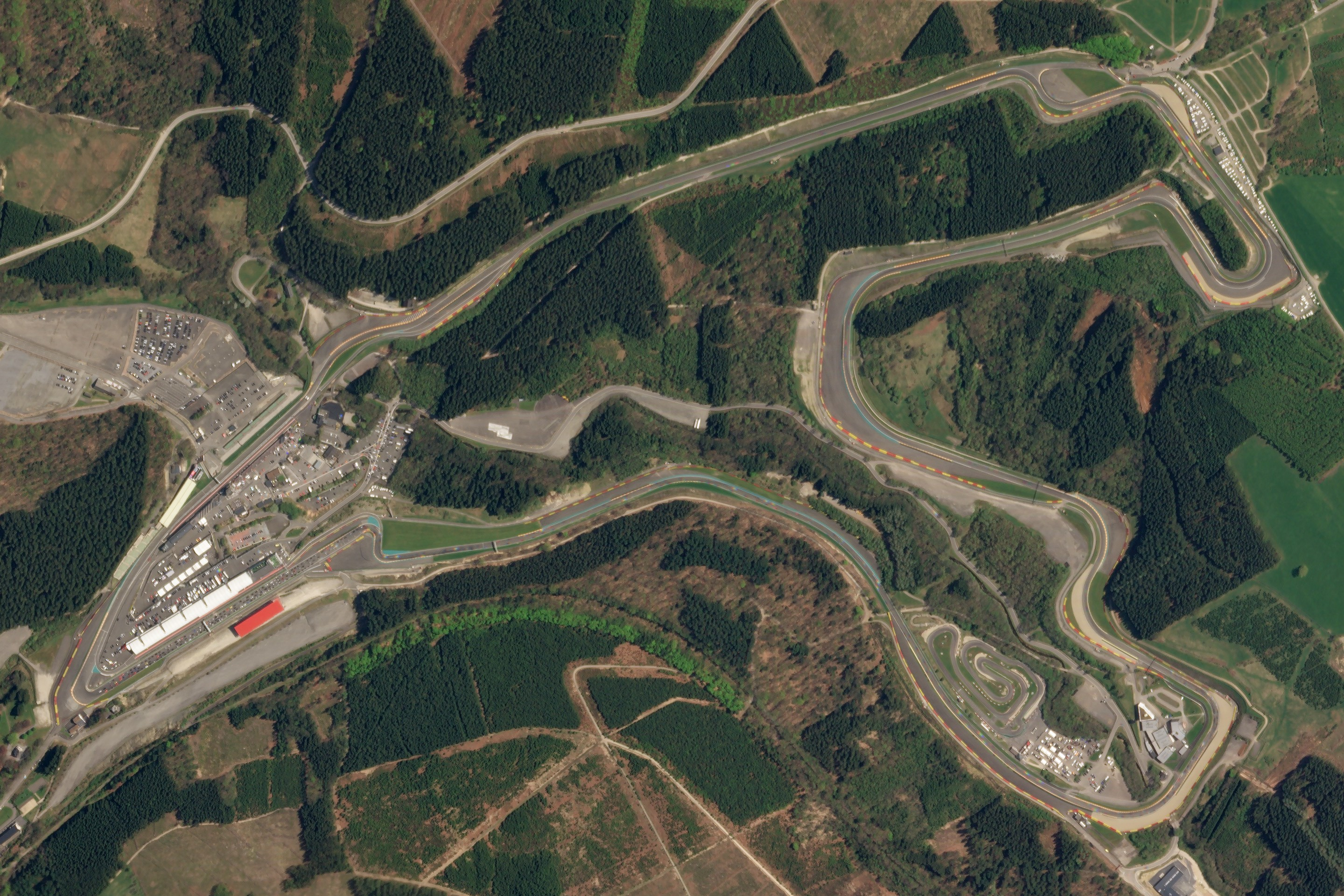
Satellite photo of Spa-Francorchamps in 2018

Over the years, the Spa course has been modified several times. The track was originally 14.982 km (9.309 mi) long, but after World War II, the track underwent some changes. In 1930, the chicane at Malmedy was eliminated and bypassed, making the course even faster, but the chicane was re-installed in 1935, albeit slightly different. In 1939, "Virage de l'Ancienne Douane" was eliminated and cut short, thus creating the uphill Raidillon de l’Eau Rouge sweeping corner. In 1947, the chicane at Malmedy was again eliminated and bypassed, and was made part of the Masta Straight. The slight right-hander that was originally Hollowell (the corner before Stavelot after the second Masta Straight) was eliminated. Instead of going through a slight left-hander that went into the town of Stavelot and a sharp right-hander at a road junction in Stavelot, a shortcut was built that became a very fast, very wide right-handed turn that bypassed Stavelot. All these changes made the final configuration of the old Spa circuit 14.100 km (8.761 mi) long, and also made Spa the fastest open road circuit in the world. In the final years of the old circuit, drivers could average 240 km/h (150 mph). The biggest change, however, saw the circuit being shortened from 14.100 to 6.947 km (8.761 to 4.317 mi) in 1979. The start/finish line, which was originally on the downhill straight before Eau Rouge, was moved to the straight before the La Source hairpin in 1981. Like its predecessor, the new layout is still a fast and hilly route through the Ardennes where speeds in excess of 330 km/h (210 mph) can be reached. Since its inception, the place has been famous for its unpredictable weather, where drivers are confronted with one part of the course being clear and bright while another stretch is rainy and slippery.

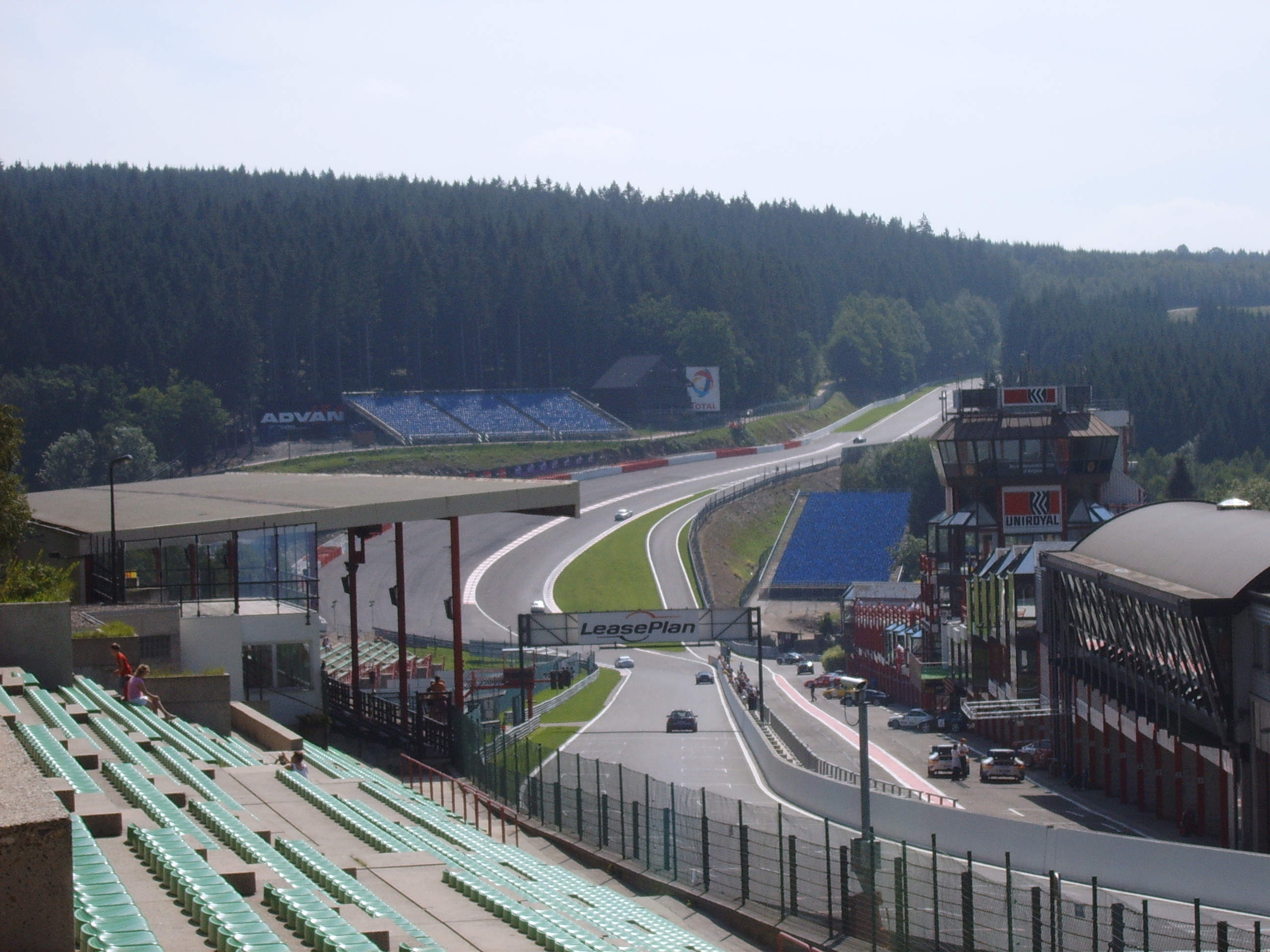
The "Raidillon de l'Eau Rouge" in the Eau Rouge valley

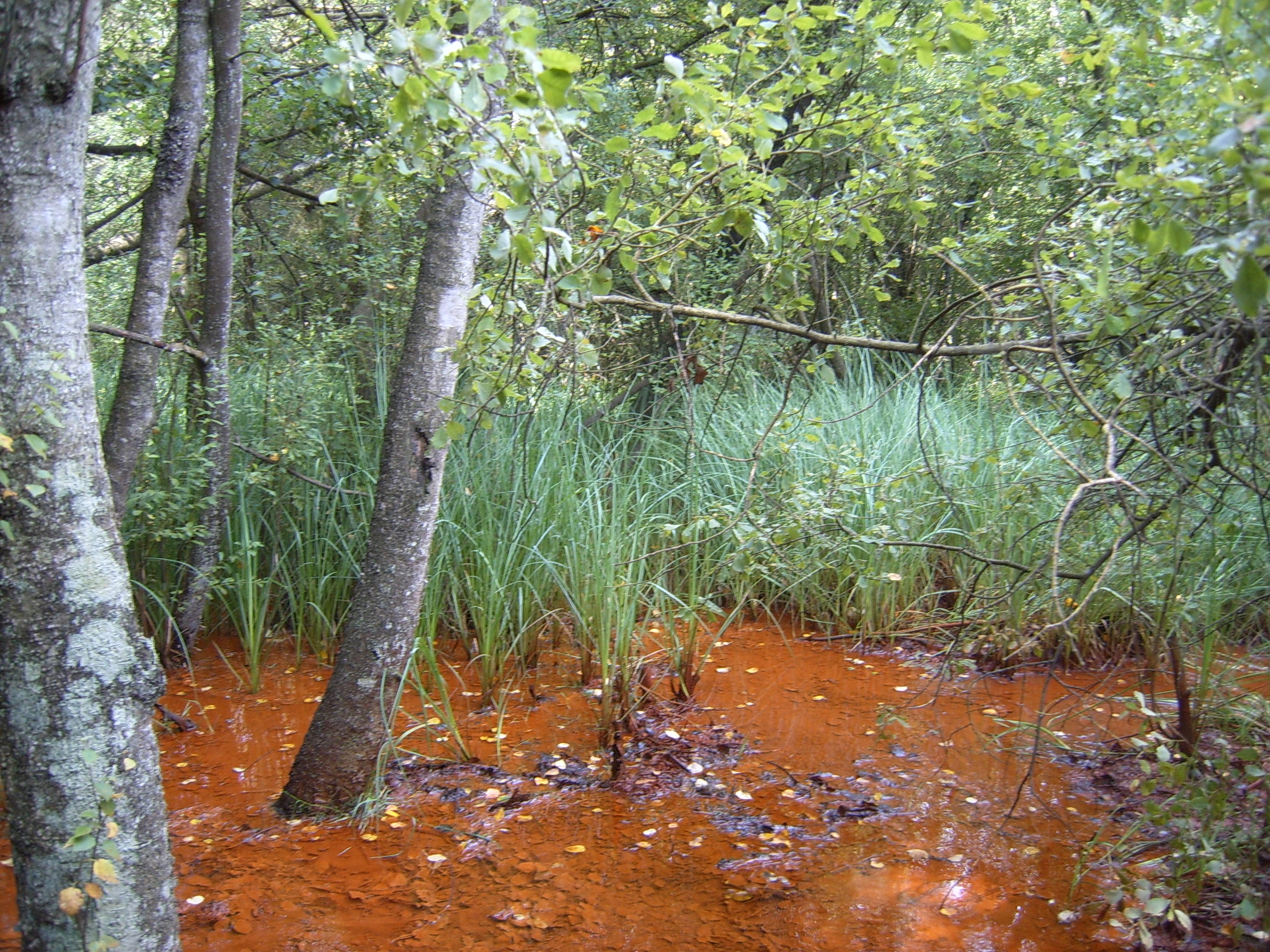
Red water ("Eau rouge" in French) on the banks of the river close to the circuit

==== Raidillon de l'Eau Rouge ====
The most famous part of the circuit is the Raidillon de l'Eau Rouge combination. Having negotiated the La Source hairpin, drivers race down a straight to the point where the track crosses the Eau Rouge stream for the first time, before being launched steeply uphill into a sweeping left-right-left series of corners with a blind summit. The Eau Rouge corner was only the left-hander at the bottom which led to the Ancienne Douane hairpin. The combination requires an amount of skill from the driver to negotiate it well and the long Kemmel straight ahead produces overtaking opportunities for drivers at the following "Les Combes" corner. The corner was tighter and narrower before 1970, allowing drivers to take the corner faster.

Two-time F1 World Champion Fernando Alonso explained:

...You come into the corner downhill, have a sudden change [of direction] at the bottom and then go very steep uphill. From the cockpit, you cannot see the exit and as you come over the crest, you don't know where you will land. It is a crucial corner for the timed lap, and also in the race, because you have a long uphill straight afterwards where you can lose a lot of time if you make a mistake. But it is also an important corner for the driver's feeling. It makes a special impression every lap, because you also have a compression in your body as you go through the bottom of the corner. It is very strange – but good fun as well.

Taking the Raidillon de l'Eau Rouge flat out is a challenge for drivers. Touring cars can take the corner at 160–180 km/h (99–112 mph), and Formula One cars at over 300 km/h (190 mph) due to high downforce. World Champion Jacques Villeneuve once spoke of the effects of downforce, saying that to get through the corner the drivers have to drive faster, because downforce increases the faster a race car goes. Without lifting the throttle through Eau Rouge, a car would be flat out from La Source, along the Kemmel straight to Les Combes, a total distance of 2.015 km (1.252 mi).

A loss of control through this section can often lead to a heavy shunt, as usually the rear end of the car is lost, and the resulting impact is often lateral. Several famous racing drivers have crashed while driving through Raidillon de l'Eau Rouge, including Stefan Bellof fatally in a Porsche sportscar, Guy Renard during the 1990 24h of Spa-Francorchamps in a Toyota Corolla GT, and Alex Zanardi in a season-ending crash during a practice session of the 1993 Belgian Grand Prix in a Lotus. Jacques Villeneuve suffered a heavy crash at the top of Raidillon de l'Eau Rouge in qualifying during the 1999 Belgian Grand Prix, which he described as "my best-ever crash". His teammate Ricardo Zonta followed Villeneuve by having a similar accident later in practice, leading cartoonist Jim Bamber to show BAR boss Craig Pollock telling Zonta: "Jacques is the quickest through Eau Rouge, so go out there and do exactly what Jacques does…" It was revealed later that Villeneuve and Zonta had a personal bet to see if either could take the corner flat out.

Following the deaths of Roland Ratzenberger and Ayrton Senna at Imola in 1994, the following F1 races saw the introduction of chicanes made up from stacked tyres. The entry to Raidillon de l'Eau Rouge was obstructed in such a way in 1994, although it was returned to its previous configuration the following year. The corner was slightly modified for the 2002 Belgian Grand Prix.

When fans first saw the course configuration at the start of the weekend of the 2005 Turkish Grand Prix, they noted that an uphill kink on the back straight was similar to Raidillon de l'Eau Rouge; the kink was therefore jokingly dubbed "Faux Rouge" (a pun on the name of the original Spa corner using the French word "faux", meaning "false").

Video of the Kemmel Straight

==== Blanchimont ====
The Blanchimont high-speed left-hand turn, present in both the old 14.100 km (8.761 mi) circuit and the new, shorter, 7.004 km (4.352 mi) track, is the final sweeping corner of the track before the chicane, which leads to the pit straight.

This turn and the approach to it have been the scene of severe accidents over time, the most recent being in 2001, when Luciano Burti lost the front wing of his Prost due to a clash with Eddie Irvine's Jaguar, losing front downforce and steering, leaving the track at 298 km/h (185 mph) and piling into the tyre wall, the impact knocking him out and burying the car into a mound of tyres. Problems have also occurred in lower classes of racing with Tom Kristensen having a violent crash in a Formula 3000 car in 1997 after running wide on the entry to the Blanchimont turn and subsequently hitting the wall, throwing the monocoque back out in the middle of the track, where it was hit by numerous cars before coming to a complete halt.

The run-off area is narrower than in other turns taken at this speed, and behind the protective barriers there is a 7–8 metre drop. This is the first turn taken by the cars after the new track rejoins the route of the old 14.100 km (8.761 mi) track. Blanchimont was also the scene where in 1992 after Érik Comas had crashed heavily during Friday's session; Ayrton Senna stopped, disembarked his car and sprinted to help the injured driver, with other cars driving past at racing speeds.

==== Jacky Ickx corner ====
From the 2018 Belgian Grand Prix turn 11 has been called the Jacky Ickx corner as a tribute to his career. The corner was formerly known by most drivers as either "Speakers corner" because the circuit's public address announcer could see the cars for the first time after the cars disappeared into the forest past Raidillon de l’Eau Rouge, or simply "The Corner with No Name". There are two versions of Jacky Ickx as of 2022, being the primary corner for cars and a shorter corner for motorcycles.

== Problems and renovations ==
Due to the introduction of the Television Without Frontiers Directive (1989), tobacco advertising and sponsorship on television were banned within the European Union from 1991, causing Formula One to face a major threat regarding races in Europe. Due to these political and legislative circumstances, the Grand Prix at Spa was left out of the 2003 calendar as a response to the internal tobacco legislation in Belgium. The event was tagged as a world class event within the national senate, and thus it was saved for the 2004 Formula One season. The final Bus Stop chicane was reprofiled for 2004 with an additional sweep to the right.

Spa was dropped from the Formula One calendar in 2006. The organiser of the event went bankrupt in late 2005, and therefore the planned improvements to the race track and paddock had not yet been made. The Wallonia government stepped in and provided the necessary funds, but too late for the 2006 race to take place.

=== Redevelopment for the 2007 season ===
With a new financial backer, the renovation started on 6 November 2006 and finished in May 2007, costing around €19 million. Formula 1 returned to Spa for 2007, with a modified track layout. The Bus Stop chicane was moved back towards Blanchimont and the La Source hairpin moved forward. This allowed more space for the new pit lane, and gave a longer start/finish straight.

=== Modifications ===
New asphalt runoff was added to the inside and outside of Les Combes for the 2010 race, in line with the prevailing trends at other Formula One circuits. Prior to the 2013 race, drainage grooves were cut into the asphalt on the start–finish straight, underneath the first 11 grid slots. Drivers were initially concerned that this would affect grip at the start.

=== Raidillon de l'Eau Rouge safety concerns ===
In Spa Francorchamps' tenure as a permanent racing facility, after it was removed from the public road network in 2000, there have been multiple accidents in the Raidillon de l'Eau Rouge combination. Due to driver safety being paramount to racing organizations and governing bodies like the Fédération Internationale de l'Automobile, these crashes opened up public debate on whether the Raidillon de l'Eau Rouge combination was deemed unsafe. Criticism centred around the nature of the tyre barrier and run-off area of Raidillon de l'Eau Rouge, which tended to bounce out-of-control cars back onto the track rather than collect them.

In October 2020 the circuit announced that gravel traps would be placed at La Source, Raidillon de l'Eau Rouge, Blanchimont, Les Combes and Stavelot. The runoff areas of some corners including Raidillon would be expanded. It was part of an €80 million upgrade to the circuit that would make it able to hold motorcycle races. The upgrade will also include a grandstand at the top of the Raidillon de l'Eau Rouge hill. The upgrades were completed in March 2022, ready for the FIM Endurance World Championship race held in June. The circuit was also shortened to 6.985 km (4.340 mi), as the Jacky Ickx corner is bypassed in favour of a shorter section with more runoff for motorcycles.

==== Fatal crash of Formula 2 driver Anthoine Hubert in 2019 ====
During the Formula 2 feature race in late August, a serious incident between Anthoine Hubert and Juan Manuel Correa occurred shortly after Raidillon on the Kemmel Straight. As the second lap began, Trident driver Giuliano Alesi lost control of his car as he climbed the Raidillon de l'Eau Rouge curves due to a puncture he had received earlier, causing his car to spin and hit the left wall of the circuit, tearing off his rear wing and spreading debris onto the track. As another Trident driver, Ralph Boschung reached the crest of Raidillon de l'Eau Rouge, he slowed down and moved towards the run-off area to avoid Alesi's damaged car and the field of debris. Hubert, who was following Boschung closely and had no view of what had happened to Alesi, moved right to avoid Boschung's slowing car, clipping Boschung's right rear wheel with his front wing. Hubert's car crashed into the tyre barrier on the right side of the track along the Kemmel straight at an acute angle and was deflected sideways into the path of Charouz driver Juan Manuel Correa, who struck it on the left side in the driver seat area.

The incident resulted in the death of Hubert and serious injury to Correa, with the feature race being abandoned and the scheduled sprint race a day later being cancelled too, whilst the Formula 1 Belgian Grand Prix went ahead.

==== 2021 W Series and Formula One incidents ====
During the qualifying session of the W Series, rain started to fall, affecting the grip. This caused an incident that involved six cars crashing into each other. Sarah Moore was the first driver to lose control of her car, spinning into the barrier at Raidillon de l'Eau Rouge. Abbie Eaton also lost the car and spun into the same barrier. She bounced back into Moore at low speed. Beitske Visser lost the rear end, spun around and went straight into Eaton and Moore, causing Eaton to become airborne. Ayla Ågren did the same as Visser, spinning and running into Moore and an airborne Eaton. Belén García then hit all four cars, causing Visser to become airborne and mount the tyre barrier. The final car of Fabienne Wohlwend then hit Beitske Visser head on, causing Visser to spin into the track and roll over. The incident ended with cars all over the track and run off areas. All drivers were checked as a precaution, and Visser and Agren were sent to hospital for x-rays and further checks. Eventually, all drivers were cleared and unharmed.

Just one day after the W Series crash, Formula One held its qualifying session in heavy rain. In the third segment of qualifying, many drivers were complaining that the conditions were not safe and that the session should be delayed or red flagged. Lando Norris then had a snap of oversteer, and subsequently corrected, but then aquaplaned into the tyre barrier at Raidillon de l'Eau Rouge. His McLaren then spun into the track while crossing the racing line. Norris was taken to hospital for x-rays, but was cleared to race the next day.

After this crash and the W Series incident just a day before, drivers from all series were calling for changes to that section of the track on social media and interviews, including Jack Aitken, who a month earlier suffered a broken collarbone and fractured vertebra after a crash at Raidillon de l'Eau Rouge in the 2021 24 Hours of Spa, alongside Zhou Guanyu, Pietro Fittipaldi, Carlos Sainz Jr., Sacha Fenestraz, Jake Hughes, Daniel Ricciardo, and Toto Wolff, who all publicly agreed that changes need to be made immediately to make the circuit safer.

==== Other incidents ====
Multiple other incidents have happened at the Raidillon de l'Eau Rouge section of the circuit. These include crashes for Kevin Magnussen in 2016, where he managed to walk away with only minor injuries; Pietro Fittipaldi in 2018, where he broke his leg, and Jack Aitken in 2021, where he broke his collarbone, and the fatal crash of Dilano van 't Hoff in 2023.

=== Redevelopment for the 2022 season ===
Ahead of the 2022 FIM EWC 24H Spa EWC Motos race and 2022 F1 Grand Prix, the circuit underwent a major facility and safety facility redevelopment which had been planned since 2020. Extra run-off was added to the Raidillon de l'Eau Rouge part of the course – changes made in response to several big accidents in recent years at that section of the track, including the fatal accident of Anthoine Hubert during the 2019 Spa-Francorchamps Formula 2 round. In addition, gravel traps were added to and modified at various corners around the circuit including: La Source, Les Combes, Speaker's Corner, Pouhon (or double gauche), Stavelot, and Blanchimont. The track has also been resurfaced for this year's event altering track grip levels, with Max Verstappen being the first driver to run a Formula One car around the renovated circuit in a Red Bull RB7. Jarno Zaffelli, head of Dromo Circuit Design, the company who carried out the renovations, revealed that twenty possible different iterations of Eau Rouge were evaluated, with the selected iteration chosen with the help of form of ex-Formula One drivers Thierry Boutsen and Emanuele Pirro and fine tuned with simulations for Formula One and GT cars.

Spa-Francorchamps is part of the 2023 Formula 1 calendar, and its contract was extended to 2025 in October 2023.

== Other racing series ==
Besides Formula 1 other races in different motorsports classes are hosted at Spa-Francorchamps. The most notable ones are the FIA World Endurance Championship, FIM Endurance World Championship, European Le Mans Series, Intercontinental GT Challenge, GT World Challenge Europe, FIA Formula 2 Championship, FIA Formula 3 Championship, FIM Endurance World Championship, International GT Open, ADAC GT Masters and previously the FIA World Rallycross Championship, Sidecar World Championship, DTM and the WTCC. The most famous long-distance and sports car races are the Spa 24 Hours and the 6 Hours of Spa-Francorchamps. The circuit also hosts a 25-hour and 24-hour races for Citroën 2CV cars.

=== Events ===
Current events

- 16–19 April: 24H Series 12 Hours of Spa-Francorchamps, Radical Cup Europe, TCR Europe Cup
- 23–26 April: Spa Summer Classic
- 1–2 May: Fun Cup Franco Fun Festival
- 7–9 May: FIA World Endurance Championship 6 Hours of Spa-Francorchamps, Porsche Carrera Cup Benelux, Legends of Le Mans
- 15–17 May: International GT Open, TCR Europe Touring Car Series, Euroformula Open Championship, GT Cup Open Europe, Porsche Carrera Cup Germany
- 22–24 May: Classic Endurance Racing Spa Classic, GT3 Revival Series
- 28–31 May: Supercar Challenge Spa Euro Race, Formula Regional European Championship, GB3 Championship
- 5–6 June: FIM Endurance World Championship 8 Hours of Spa Motos
- 19–21 June: GT2 European Series SRO Speedweek, British GT Championship, FFSA GT Championship, Porsche Carrera Cup France, French F4 Championship, Alpine Cup Series, TC France Series
- 25–28 June: Intercontinental GT Challenge / GT World Challenge Europe Spa 24 Hours, GT4 European Series, Lamborghini Super Trofeo Europe, McLaren Trophy Europe
- 2–5 July: Fun Cup 25 Hours of Spa, Belcar
- 17–19 July: Formula One Belgian Grand Prix, FIA Formula 2 Championship Spa-Francorchamps Formula 2 round, FIA Formula 3 Championship, Porsche Supercup
- 21–23 August: European Le Mans Series 4 Hours of Spa, Le Mans Cup, Ligier European Series
- 28–30 August: Porsche Sports Cup Deutschland ADAC Racing Weekend Spa, GT Summer Series
- 3–5 September: 992 Endurance Cup, Prototype Cup Europe, 7 Racing Eurocup
- 17–20 September: Ultimate Cup Series
- 24–27 September: Spa Six Hours, Porsche Sprint Challenge Benelux

Future events

- Eurocup-3 (2023–2025, 2027)
- F4 British Championship (2027)
- Ferrari Challenge Europe (1997–2007, 2011–2012, 2018, 2020–2021, 2023, 2025, 2027)
- IMSA Ford Mustang Challenge (2027)

Former events

- ADAC Formel Masters (2011, 2013)
- ADAC Formula 4 (2015, 2022)
- ADAC GT Masters (2013, 2015, 2024)
- ATS Formel 3 Cup (2011–2013)
- Auto GP (2002–2004, 2006–2008, 2010)
- BOSS GP (2003, 2008–2011, 2020)
- BPR Global GT Series (1994, 1996)
- British Formula 3 International Series (1984–1988, 1997–2000, 2003–2004, 2006–2014)
- Deutsche Tourenwagen Masters (2005, 2020, 2022)
- DTM Trophy (2020, 2022)
- EFDA Nations Cup (1990)
- Eurocup Clio (2011–2013)
- Eurocup Mégane Trophy (2008–2013)
- European Formula Two Championship (1981–1982)
- European Touring Car Championship (1966–1973, 1976, 1982–1986, 1988, 2002–2004)
- European Touring Car Cup (2014)
- Ferrari Challenge UK (2023)
- F4 Spanish Championship (2021–2023)
- FIA European Formula 3 Cup (2004)
- FIA European Rallycross Championship (2019, 2021–2022)
- FIA Formula 3 European Championship (2012, 2014–2018)
- FIA Formula 3 International Trophy (2011)
- FIA GT Championship (1997, 2001–2009)
- FIA GT1 World Championship (2010)
- FIA GT3 European Championship (2006)
- FIA Sportscar Championship (1999–2003)
- FIA World Rallycross Championship
  - World RX of Benelux (2019, 2021–2022)
- Formula 3 Euro Series (2005)
- Formula Abarth (2011)
- Formula BMW ADAC (2005)
- Formula BMW Europe (2008–2010)
- Formula Palmer Audi (2000, 2003–2006, 2008)
- Formula Renault 2.0 Alps (2011–2015)
- Formula Renault 2.0 West European Cup (1999, 2008–2009)
- Formula Renault Eurocup (1993–1995, 1997–2000, 2002, 2004, 2008–2020)
- Formula Renault Northern European Cup (2006–2018)
- Formula Renault V6 Eurocup (2003–2004)
- French Formula Three Championship (2000–2001)
- French Supertouring Championship (2000–2001)
- GP2 Series
  - Spa-Francorchamps GP2 round (2005, 2007–2016)
- GP3 Series (2010–2018)
- Grand Prix motorcycle racing
  - Belgian motorcycle Grand Prix (1949–1979, 1981–1986, 1988–1990)
- GT4 Scandinavia (2022–2023)
- International Formula 3000 (1985–1987, 1989, 1991–2002, 2004)
- International Formula Master (2005, 2009)
- International GTSprint Series (2011–2012)
- Italian F4 Championship (2022–2023)
- Italian Formula Renault Championship (2002–2009)
- Italian Formula Three Championship (2011)
- Racecar Euro Series (2012)
- Porsche Carrera Cup Great Britain (2015)
- Porsche Carrera Cup Italia (2008, 2015)
- Prototype Cup Germany (2022, 2024–2025)
- Renault Sport Trophy (2015–2016)
- SEAT León Eurocup (2014)
- Sidecar World Championship (1949–1979, 1981–1990, 2022–2023)
- Super Tourenwagen Cup (1994–1995)
- Superbike World Championship (1992)
- Superstars Series (2011–2012)
- TCR International Series (2016–2017)
- TCR UK Touring Car Championship (2019)
- TCR World Tour (2023)
- Trofeo Maserati (2004–2006, 2014)
- World Series Formula V8 3.5 (2006–2017)
- World Sportscar Championship (1953, 1963–1975, 1981–1990)
- World Touring Car Championship
  - WTCC Race of Belgium (1987, 2005, 2014)
- W Series (2021)

== Layout history ==
Circuit de Spa-Francorchamps layout history
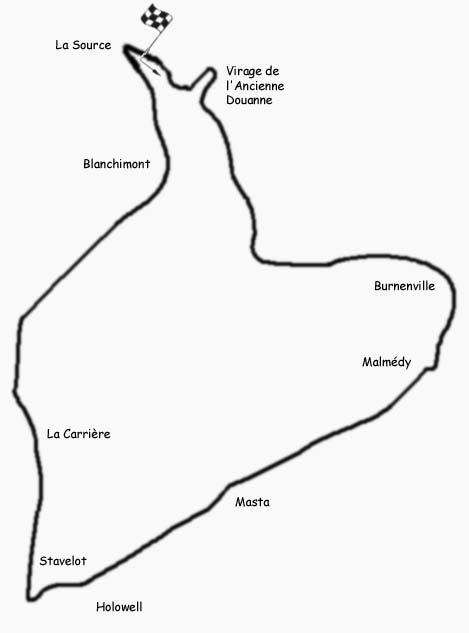
Original Grand Prix Circuit (1921–1938)

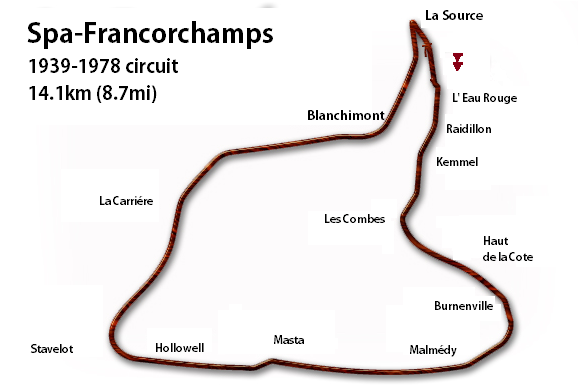
Old Grand Prix Circuit (1939-1978)

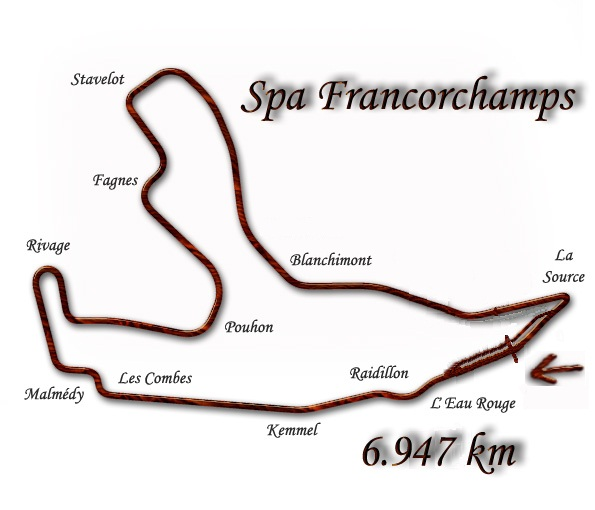
Modern Grand Prix Circuit (1979–1980)

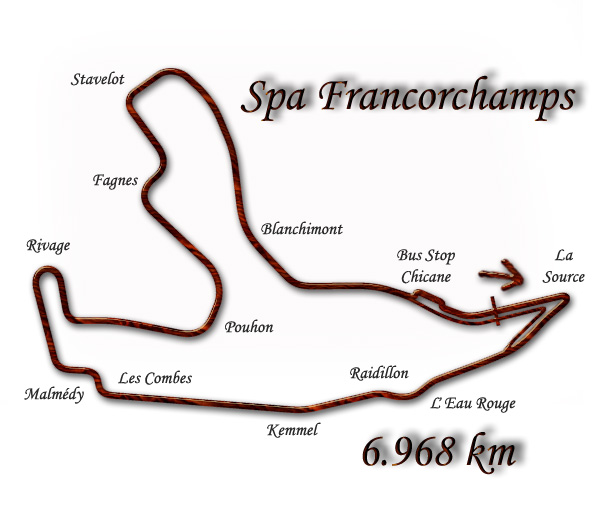
Modern Grand Prix Circuit with Original Bus Stop Chicane (1981–1993, 1995–2003)

Modern Grand Prix Circuit with Modified Eau Rouge Chicane (1994)

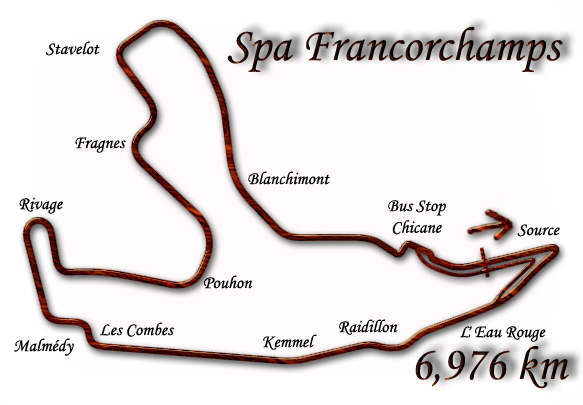
Modern Grand Prix Circuit with Modified Bus Stop Chicane (2004–2006)

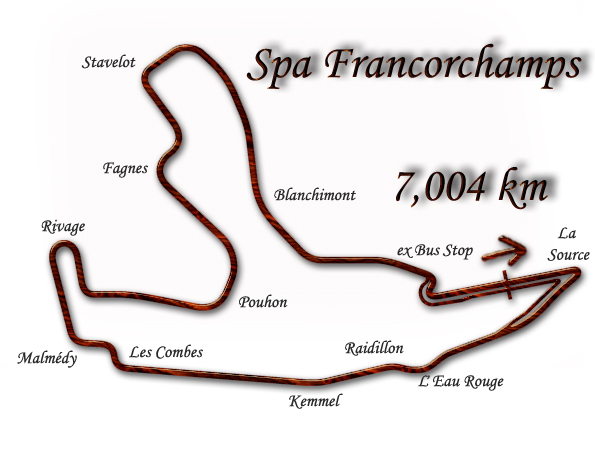
Modern Grand Prix with New Pit Lane and Bus Stop Chicane (2007–present)

Rallycross Circuit (2019–present)

== Lap records ==
The unofficial all-time track record set during a race weekend is 1:40.510, set by Oscar Piastri in a McLaren MCL39, during sprint qualifying for the 2025 Belgian Grand Prix. The official lap record for the current circuit layout is 1:44.701, set by Sergio Pérez in a Red Bull Racing RB20 during the 2024 Belgian Grand Prix. As of September 2026, the fastest official race lap records of the modern Spa-Francorchamps circuit for several top series have been listed as:

Category	Time	Driver	Vehicle	Event
Modern Grand Prix Circuit with New Pit Lane and Bus Stop Chicane (2007–present): 7.004 km (4.352 mi)
Formula One	1:44.701	Sergio Pérez	Red Bull Racing RB20	2024 Belgian Grand Prix
GP2	1:56.731	Sergio Pérez	Dallara GP2/08	2009 Spa GP2 round
LMP1	1:57.394	Mike Conway	Toyota TS050 Hybrid	2019 6 Hours of Spa-Francorchamps
FIA F2	1:59.029	Paul Aron	Dallara F2 2024	2024 Spa F2 round
Formula Renault 3.5	2:00.928	Jules Bianchi	Dallara T12	2012 Spa Formula Renault 3.5 Series round
LMP2	2:01.257	Charles Milesi	Oreca 07	2024 4 Hours of Spa-Francorchamps
LMH	2:02.327	Kamui Kobayashi	Toyota GR010 Hybrid	2023 6 Hours of Spa-Francorchamps
LMDh	2:04.109	Julien Andlauer	Porsche 963	2025 6 Hours of Spa-Francorchamps
Auto GP	2:04.921	Romain Grosjean	Lola B05/52	2010 Spa Auto GP round
FIA F3	2:05.770	Callum Voisin	Dallara F3 2019	2024 Spa F3 round
GP3	2:06.456	Daniil Kvyat	Dallara GP3/13	2013 Spa GP3 round
FTwo (2009–2012)	2:07.722	Markus Pommer	Williams JPH1B	2012 Spa FTwo round
Class 1 Touring Cars	2:08.715	René Rast	Audi RS5 Turbo DTM 2020	2020 Spa DTM round
Euroformula Open	2:09.684	Yevan David	Dallara 324	2025 Spa Euroformula Open round
Formula Regional	2:11.216	Freddie Slater	Tatuus F3 T-318	2025 Spa FREC round
LMP3	2:11.843	Gaël Julien	Ligier JS P320	2024 4 Hours of Spa-Francorchamps
GB3	2:12.529	Nikita Bedrin	Tatuus MSV GB3-025	2026 Spa GB3 round
NP02	2:13.038	Stephan Rupp	Nova Proto NP02	2026 Spa European Endurance Prototype Cup round
International Formula Master	2:13.513	Fabio Leimer	Tatuus N.T07	2009 Spa Formula Master round
LM GTE	2:13.658	Kévin Estre	Porsche 911 RSR-19	2021 6 Hours of Spa-Francorchamps
LMPC	2:14.933	Franck Lagorce	Oreca FLM09	2009 Spa Formula Le Mans Cup round
GT3	2:15.264	Dean MacDonald	McLaren 720S GT3 Evo	2025 Spa International GT Open round
GT1 (GTS)	2:15.423	Oliver Gavin	Chevrolet Corvette C6.R	2009 24 Hours of Spa
Renault Sport Trophy	2:15.795	Pieter Schothorst	Renault Sport R.S. 01	2016 Spa Renault Sport Trophy round
Formula Renault 2.0	2:18.441	Matevos Isaakyan	Tatuus FR2.0/13	2015 Spa Eurocup Formula Renault 2.0 round
Lamborghini Super Trofeo	2:18.893	Loris Spinelli	Lamborghini Huracán Super Trofeo Evo2	2022 Spa Lamborghini Super Trofeo Europe round
SRO GT2	2:19.080	Pierre Kaffer	Audi R8 LMS GT2	2024 Spa GT2 European Series round
Ferrari Challenge	2:19.084	Felix Hirsiger	Ferrari 296 Challenge	2025 Spa Ferrari Challenge Europe round
Porsche Carrera Cup	2:19.304	Flynt Schuring	Porsche 911 (992 II) Cup	2026 Spa Porsche Carrera Cup Germany round
Formula Abarth	2:20.346	Patric Niederhauser	Tatuus FA010	2011 Spa Formula Abarth round
Formula Palmer Audi	2:22.282	Jolyon Palmer	Formula Palmer Audi car	2008 Spa Formula Palmer Audi round
Radical Cup	2:22.325	Filip Svensson	Radical SR10	2026 Mugello Radical Cup Europe round
Formula 4	2:22.522	Rafael Câmara	Tatuus F4-T421	2022 Spa Italian F4 round
JS P4	2:22.725	Romain Boeckler	Ligier JS P4	2025 Spa Ligier European Series round
Eurocup Mégane Trophy	2:25.504	Mirko Bortolotti	Renault Mégane Renault Sport II	2013 Spa Eurocup Mégane Trophy round
TC1	2:26.579	Yvan Muller	Citroën C-Elysée WTCC	2014 FIA WTCC Race of Belgium
TCR Touring Car	2:27.568	Alex Ley	Hyundai Elantra N TCR	2026 Spa TCR Europe Cup round
GT4	2:28.679	Ulysse de Pauw	Ginetta G56 GT4 Evo	2024 Spa FFSA GT4 round
JS2 R	2:29.158	Steven Palette	Ligier JS2 R	2025 Spa Ligier European Series round
Formula BMW	2:30.020	Jazeman Jaafar	Mygale FB02	2009 Spa Formula BMW Europe round
Trofeo Maserati	2:31.200	Mauro Calamia	Maserati Trofeo	2014 Spa Trofeo Maserati Corse World Series round
ADAC Formel Masters	2:31.463	Jason Kremer	Dallara Formulino	2013 Spa ADAC Formel Masters round
Alpine Elf Cup	2:32.364	Mateo Herrero	Alpine A110 Cup	2025 Spa Alpine Elf Cup round
Formula Renault 1.6	2:33.265	Felix Hirsiger	Signatech FR 1.6	2013 Spa French F4 round
Super 2000	2:33.788	Franz Engstler	BMW 320 TC	2014 FIA WTCC Race of Belgium
Stock car racing	2:34.795	Ander Vilariño	Chevrolet Camaro NASCAR	2012 Spa Racecar Euro Series round
SEAT León Supercopa	2:35.210	Gábor Wéber	SEAT León Cup Racer	2014 Spa SEAT León Eurocup round
Renault Clio Cup	2.45.734	Éric Trémoulet	Renault Clio III RS (197)	2013 Spa Eurocup Clio round
Motorcycle Circuit with Modified Speaker's Corner Curve (2022–present): 6.985 km (4.340 mi)
Superbike	2:19.140	Sylvain Guintoli	BMW M1000RR	2025 8 Hours of Spa Motos
Modern Grand Prix Circuit with Modified Bus Stop Chicane (2004–2006): 6.976 km (4.335 mi)
Formula One	1:45.108	Kimi Räikkönen	McLaren MP4-19B	2004 Belgian Grand Prix
Formula Renault 3.5	2:06.447	Miloš Pavlović	Dallara T05	2006 Spa Formula Renault 3.5 Series round
LMP1	2:06.626	Jamie Davies	Audi R8	2004 1000 km of Spa
GP2	2:07.563	Alexandre Prémat	Dallara GP2/05	2005 Spa GP2 round
F3000	2:08.457	Marco Bonanomi	Lola B02/50	2006 Spa Euroseries 3000 round
LMP2	2:08.781	Miguel Angel Castro	Lola B05/40	2006 1000 km of Spa
DTM	2:13.134	Mika Häkkinen	AMG-Mercedes C-Klasse 2005	2005 Spa DTM round
Formula Three	2:13.844	Lewis Hamilton	Dallara F305	2005 Spa F3 Euro Series round
GT1 (GTS)	2:15.598	Jamie Davies	Maserati MC12 GT1	2005 24 Hours of Spa
FIA Group 2	2:19.704	Marc Goossens	Chevrolet Corvette C5-R	2004 24 Hours of Spa
Formula Palmer Audi	2:20.560	Joe Tandy	Formula Palmer Audi car	2005 Spa Formula Palmer Audi round
Formula Renault 2.0	2:20.758	Scott Speed	Tatuus FR2000	2004 Spa Formula Renault 2000 Eurocup round
N-GT	2:23.052	Romain Dumas	Porsche 911 (996) GT3-RSR	2004 24 Hours of Spa
GT2	2:23.862	Emmanuel Collard	Porsche 911 (996) GT3-RSR	2005 24 Hours of Spa
FIA Group 3	2:28.231	Xavier Maassen	Dodge Viper Competition Coupe	2004 24 Hours of Spa
Porsche Carrera Cup	2:29.871	Wolf Henzler	Porsche 911 (996) GT3 Cup	2004 Spa Porsche Supercup round
Formula BMW	2:30.983	Chris van der Drift	Mygale FB02	2005 Spa Formula BMW ADAC round
Super 2000	2:32.302	Frank Diefenbacher	SEAT Toledo Cupra	2004 Spa ETCC round
Ferrari Challenge	2:34.083	John Bosch	Ferrari F430 Challenge	2006 Spa Ferrari Challenge Europe round
Modern Grand Prix Circuit with Original Bus Stop Chicane (1995–2003): 6.968 km (4.330 mi)
Formula One	1:47.176	Michael Schumacher	Ferrari F2002	2002 Belgian Grand Prix
F3000	2:07.133	Sébastien Bourdais	Lola B02/50	2002 Spa F3000 round
LMP900	2:08.074	Tom Kristensen	Audi R8	2003 1000 km of Spa
WSC	2:09.951	Mauro Baldi	Ferrari 333 SP	1999 500 km of Spa
GT1 (Prototype)	2:12.058	Bernd Schneider	Mercedes-Benz CLK GTR	1997 FIA GT Spa 4 Hours
Group C	2:12.167	Robbie Stirling	Lola T92/10	1997 Spa Interserie round
Formula Renault 3.5	2:13.586	José María López	Tatuus FRV6	2003 Spa Formula Renault V6 Eurocup round
Formula Three	2:14.843	Ryō Fukuda	Dallara F399	2001 Spa French F3 round
GT1	2:16.978	Thierry Boutsen	Porsche 911 GT1	1996 4 Hours of Spa
LMP675	2:17.051	Mirko Savoldi	Lucchini SR2002	2002 FIA Sportscar Championship Spa
GT1 (GTS)	2:18.745	Andrea Piccini	Ferrari 550 GTS Maranello	2002 24 Hours of Spa
FIA Group 2	2:22.940	Pedro Lamy	Chrysler Viper GTS-R	2003 24 Hours of Spa
Formula Renault 2.0	2:24.663	Renaud Derlot	Tatuus FR2000	2000 2nd Spa Formula Renault 2000 Eurocup round
GT2	2:26.077	Jean-Pierre Jarier	Porsche 911 GT2	1998 Spa FFSA GT round
N-GT	2:26.379	Andrea Bertolini	Ferrari 360 Modena N-GT	2003 24 Hours of Spa
Super Touring	2:30.780	Peter Kox	BMW 318is	1995 Spa STW Cup round
Silhouette racing car	2:31.642	Vincent Radermecker	Opel Astra Coupé Silhouette	2001 Spa French Supertouring round
Super 2000	2:33.596	Andy Priaulx	BMW 320i	2003 Spa ETCC round
Porsche Carrera Cup	2:34.014	Peter Scharmach	Porsche 911 (996) GT3 Cup	2003 24 Hours of Spa
Group N	2:47.241	Thierry Tassin	Honda Integra Type R	1998 Spa 24 Hours
Modern Grand Prix Circuit with Modified Eau Rouge Chicane (1994): 7.001 km (4.350 mi)
Formula One	1:57.117	Damon Hill	Williams FW16B	1994 Belgian Grand Prix
GT1	2:26.440	Anders Olofsson	Ferrari F40 GTE	1994 4 Hours of Spa
F3000	2:32.388	Tarso Marques	Reynard 94D	1994 Spa F3000 round
Super Touring	2:32.780	Johnny Cecotto	BMW 318is	1994 Spa STW Cup round
Modern Grand Prix Circuit with Original Bus Stop Chicane (1981–1993): 6.940 km (4.312 mi)
Formula One	1:51.095	Alain Prost	Williams FW15C	1993 Belgian Grand Prix
Group C	2:06.211	Mauro Baldi	Mercedes-Benz C11	1990 480 km of Spa
F3000	2:06.940	Pedro Lamy	Reynard 92D	1993 Spa F3000 round
Formula Two	2:16.810	Geoff Lees	Ralt RH6/81	1981 Spa F2 round
Formula Three	2:23.660	JJ Lehto	Reynard 883	1988 Spa British F3 round
500cc	2:26.110	Kevin Schwantz	Suzuki RGV500	1989 Belgian motorcycle Grand Prix
World SBK	2:29.890	Doug Polen (Note: Both riders took the same lap time independently.); Fabrizio Pirovano	Ducati 888 SBK; Yamaha FZR1000	1992 Spa World SBK round
Jaguar Sport	2:31.420	Cor Euser	Jaguar XJR-15	1991 Spa Jaguar Intercontinental Challenge round
250cc	2:32.060	Anton Mang	Honda NSR250	1988 Belgian motorcycle Grand Prix
Group A	2:35.040	Anders Olofsson	Nissan Skyline GT-R	1992 24 Hours of Spa
Group B	2:36.260	Uwe Alzen	Porsche 911 Carrera RSR 3.8	1993 24 Hours of Spa
125cc	2:55.740	Hans Spaan	Honda RS125R	1989 Belgian motorcycle Grand Prix
80cc	2:58.240	Stefan Dörflinger	Zündapp 80	1984 Belgian motorcycle Grand Prix
Modern Grand Prix Circuit without Bus Stop Chicane (1979–1980): 6.947 km (4.317 mi)
Group 1	2:48.800	Gordon Spice	Ford Capri III 3.0S	1979 24 Hours of Spa
500cc	2:49.250	Kenny Blake	Yamaha YZR500	1979 Belgian motorcycle Grand Prix
250cc	2:50.080	Eduard Stöllinger	Kawasaki KR250	1979 Belgian motorcycle Grand Prix
125cc	3:01.280	Jean-François Lécureux	Morbidelli 125 GP	1979 Belgian motorcycle Grand Prix
Old Grand Prix Circuit (1940–1978): 14.100 km (8.761 mi)
Group 5 sportscars	3:13.400	Henri Pescarolo	Matra-Simca MS670	1973 1000km of Spa
Group 5	3:14.600	Jo Siffert	Porsche 917K	1971 1000km of Spa
Formula One	3:27.400	Chris Amon	March 701	1970 Belgian Grand Prix
Group 6	3:37.100	Brian Redman	Porsche 908 LH	1969 1000km of Spa
Group 2	3:49.400	Chris Amon	BMW 3.0 CSL	1973 24 Hours of Spa
500cc	3:50.300	Barry Sheene	Suzuki RGA500	1977 Belgian motorcycle Grand Prix
Group 3	4:04.500	Phil Hill	Shelby Cobra Daytona Coupe	1964 500 km of Spa
250cc	4:05.400	Walter Villa	Harley-Davidson RR250	1977 Belgian motorcycle Grand Prix
Group 5 touring cars	4:11.200	Chris Tuerlinx	Chevrolet Camaro	1969 24 Hours of Spa
Sidecar (B2A)	4:13.500	Rolf Steinhausen	Busch-Yamaha sidecar	1977 Belgian motorcycle Grand Prix
Group 1B	4:19.000	Loek Vermeulen	Chevrolet Camaro Z28	1978 24 Hours of Spa
125cc	4:22.200	Angel Nieto	Morbidelli 125 GP	1977 Belgian motorcycle Grand Prix
350cc	4:31.800	Libero Liberati	Gilera 350 GP	1957 Belgian motorcycle Grand Prix
Formula Two	4:34.000	José Froilán González	Maserati A6GCM-53	1953 Belgian Grand Prix
Sports car racing	4:44.000	Giuseppe Farina	Ferrari 375 MM	1953 Spa 24 Hours
50cc	5:07.400	Eugenio Lazzarini	Kreidler 50cc GP	1977 Belgian motorcycle Grand Prix
Pre-war Grand Prix Circuit (1939): 14.580 km (9.060 mi)
GP	5:19.900	Hermann Lang	Mercedes-Benz W154	1939 Belgian Grand Prix
Pre-war Grand Prix Circuit (1934–1938): 14.950 km (9.289 mi)
GP	5:04.700	Hermann Lang	Mercedes-Benz W125	1937 Belgian Grand Prix
Pre-war Grand Prix Circuit (1930–1933): 14.860 km (9.234 mi)
GP	6:00.000	Tazio Nuvolari	Maserati 8CM	1933 Belgian Grand Prix
Original Grand Prix Circuit (1920–1929): 14.980 km (9.308 mi)
GP	6:51.200	Antonio Ascari	Alfa Romeo P2	1925 Belgian Grand Prix

== In popular culture ==
As the long-time home of the Belgian Grand Prix and its location within the Ardennes forests, it has been a popular backdrop for all kinds of fictional media, from appearances in comics and motion pictures, to regular appearances in video games going back into the 1980s.

== Tour de France ==
The circuit has been used several times in the Tour de France cycling race. In 1980, the circuit was part of an individual time trial stage, won by Bernard Hinault (Renault–Gitane); while in 1989, several laps of the circuit were completed before the finish of the third stage, which was won by PDM–Ultima–Concorde's Raúl Alcalá. In 2017, the circuit was used as part of the third stage, starting in Verviers, Belgium and ending in Longwy, France.

== Climate ==
The area of Spa-Francorchamps is often rainy or having cool air temperatures, which has led to Formula One events such as the 1998 14-car pileup on a waterlogged track and the finish to the 2008 event, when rain fell during the last few laps after an all-dry race. The Royal Meteorological Institute runs weather stations both in Stavelot and in Malmedy, which both show similar oceanic climates with some interior influence.

Although temperatures generally often stay above freezing in winter, snowfall is quite common. During summer, temperatures most often remain in the low 20s, with frequent cloud cover and showers. With the World Endurance race running in spring and the Formula One race in late summer, hot temperatures during high-profile events are rare. Even so, the annual warmest temperature averages above 31 °C (88 °F). The official Spa weather station is located at a similar elevation as the race track a few miles north, and yields similar conditions to the Stavelot and Malmedy stations. Summer May nights may get rather chilly, but stay above frost during the prime season for the circuit.

Climate data for Spa (1991–2020 normals; extremes since 1950)
Month	Jan	Feb	Mar	Apr	May	Jun	Jul	Aug	Sep	Oct	Nov	Dec	Year
Record high °C (°F)	14.5 (58.1)	19.5 (67.1)	23.1 (73.6)	26.3 (79.3)	30.0 (86.0)	31.8 (89.2)	36.7 (98.1)	35.0 (95.0)	30.9 (87.6)	24.1 (75.4)	19.5 (67.1)	17.0 (62.6)	36.7 (98.1)
Mean maximum °C (°F)	9.8 (49.6)	11.6 (52.9)	16.2 (61.2)	21.1 (70.0)	24.8 (76.6)	28.1 (82.6)	29.5 (85.1)	29.4 (84.9)	24.2 (75.6)	19.7 (67.5)	14.5 (58.1)	10.3 (50.5)	31.6 (88.9)
Mean daily maximum °C (°F)	3.9 (39.0)	4.8 (40.6)	8.6 (47.5)	12.9 (55.2)	16.6 (61.9)	19.5 (67.1)	21.5 (70.7)	21.3 (70.3)	17.5 (63.5)	12.8 (55.0)	7.7 (45.9)	4.5 (40.1)	12.6 (54.7)
Daily mean °C (°F)	1.5 (34.7)	1.8 (35.2)	4.8 (40.6)	8.3 (46.9)	12.0 (53.6)	15.0 (59.0)	17.1 (62.8)	16.8 (62.2)	13.4 (56.1)	9.6 (49.3)	5.2 (41.4)	2.2 (36.0)	9.0 (48.2)
Mean daily minimum °C (°F)	−0.9 (30.4)	−1.1 (30.0)	1.0 (33.8)	3.7 (38.7)	7.5 (45.5)	10.4 (50.7)	12.6 (54.7)	12.3 (54.1)	9.3 (48.7)	6.3 (43.3)	2.7 (36.9)	0.0 (32.0)	5.3 (41.6)
Mean minimum °C (°F)	−8.4 (16.9)	−8.3 (17.1)	−4.9 (23.2)	−2.2 (28.0)	0.7 (33.3)	4.8 (40.6)	7.4 (45.3)	7.4 (45.3)	5.0 (41.0)	0.9 (33.6)	−3.1 (26.4)	−6.2 (20.8)	−11.0 (12.2)
Record low °C (°F)	−20.0 (−4.0)	−21.1 (−6.0)	−13.7 (7.3)	−9.6 (14.7)	−3.5 (25.7)	0.0 (32.0)	1.4 (34.5)	1.0 (33.8)	1.0 (33.8)	−6.2 (20.8)	−9.0 (15.8)	−17.8 (0.0)	−21.1 (−6.0)
Average precipitation mm (inches)	100.3 (3.95)	88.4 (3.48)	86.4 (3.40)	67.0 (2.64)	82.0 (3.23)	90.9 (3.58)	96.8 (3.81)	102.0 (4.02)	89.2 (3.51)	86.6 (3.41)	92.8 (3.65)	118.4 (4.66)	1,100.8 (43.34)
Average precipitation days (≥ 1 mm)	14.6	13.3	13.2	10.2	12.2	12.0	12.3	12.1	11.1	12.3	14.2	16.6	154.1
Mean monthly sunshine hours	53	72	124	174	195	202	211	201	154	108	58	42	1,594
Source 1: Royal Meteorological Institute
Source 2: Infoclimat

Climate data for Stavelot (1981–2010 normals; sunshine 1984–2013)
Month	Jan	Feb	Mar	Apr	May	Jun	Jul	Aug	Sep	Oct	Nov	Dec	Year
Mean daily maximum °C (°F)	3.4 (38.1)	4.6 (40.3)	8.5 (47.3)	12.5 (54.5)	16.7 (62.1)	19.4 (66.9)	21.7 (71.1)	21.3 (70.3)	17.4 (63.3)	12.9 (55.2)	7.3 (45.1)	4.2 (39.6)	12.6 (54.7)
Daily mean °C (°F)	0.9 (33.6)	1.2 (34.2)	4.4 (39.9)	7.4 (45.3)	11.6 (52.9)	14.4 (57.9)	16.6 (61.9)	16.2 (61.2)	12.9 (55.2)	9.3 (48.7)	4.7 (40.5)	1.7 (35.1)	8.5 (47.3)
Mean daily minimum °C (°F)	−1.8 (28.8)	−2.1 (28.2)	0.4 (32.7)	2.4 (36.3)	6.4 (43.5)	9.4 (48.9)	11.5 (52.7)	10.9 (51.6)	8.1 (46.6)	5.4 (41.7)	2.0 (35.6)	−0.7 (30.7)	4.4 (39.9)
Average precipitation mm (inches)	115.1 (4.53)	97.6 (3.84)	105.0 (4.13)	78.8 (3.10)	89.9 (3.54)	96.5 (3.80)	100.9 (3.97)	95.7 (3.77)	97.0 (3.82)	97.3 (3.83)	103.3 (4.07)	120.0 (4.72)	1,197.1 (47.13)
Average precipitation days	15.1	13.1	15.1	11.8	12.5	12.6	12.5	11.7	12.1	12.5	14.9	15.9	159.8
Mean monthly sunshine hours	45	69	113	159	185	181	197	188	133	102	49	34	1,453
Source: Royal Meteorological Institute

Climate data for Malmedy (1981–2010 normals; sunshine 1984–2013)
Month	Jan	Feb	Mar	Apr	May	Jun	Jul	Aug	Sep	Oct	Nov	Dec	Year
Mean daily maximum °C (°F)	3.0 (37.4)	4.2 (39.6)	7.9 (46.2)	11.8 (53.2)	16.2 (61.2)	18.9 (66.0)	21.1 (70.0)	20.8 (69.4)	17.1 (62.8)	12.6 (54.7)	6.9 (44.4)	3.7 (38.7)	12.1 (53.8)
Daily mean °C (°F)	0.5 (32.9)	0.8 (33.4)	4.1 (39.4)	7.0 (44.6)	11.3 (52.3)	14.0 (57.2)	16.2 (61.2)	15.8 (60.4)	12.5 (54.5)	8.9 (48.0)	4.3 (39.7)	1.3 (34.3)	8.1 (46.6)
Mean daily minimum °C (°F)	−2.1 (28.2)	−2.4 (27.7)	0.2 (32.4)	2.3 (36.1)	6.4 (43.5)	9.2 (48.6)	11.2 (52.2)	10.7 (51.3)	8.0 (46.4)	5.2 (41.4)	1.7 (35.1)	−1.0 (30.2)	4.2 (39.6)
Average precipitation mm (inches)	123.6 (4.87)	104.1 (4.10)	109.3 (4.30)	79.5 (3.13)	90.1 (3.55)	97.4 (3.83)	103.9 (4.09)	97.6 (3.84)	100.7 (3.96)	102.3 (4.03)	109.5 (4.31)	128.9 (5.07)	1,246.7 (49.08)
Average precipitation days	15.3	13.3	15.1	11.9	12.6	12.9	12.7	11.9	12.2	12.7	15.0	15.9	161.4
Mean monthly sunshine hours	44	68	111	158	184	179	195	186	132	100	47	34	1,437
Source: Royal Meteorological Institute

== See also ==
- List of Circuit de Spa-Francorchamps fatalities
- Nürburgring (nearby fellow historical circuit in Germany).
