= 2002 Belgian Grand Prix =

Race 14 of 17 in the 2002 Formula One World Championship
← Previous race	Next race →
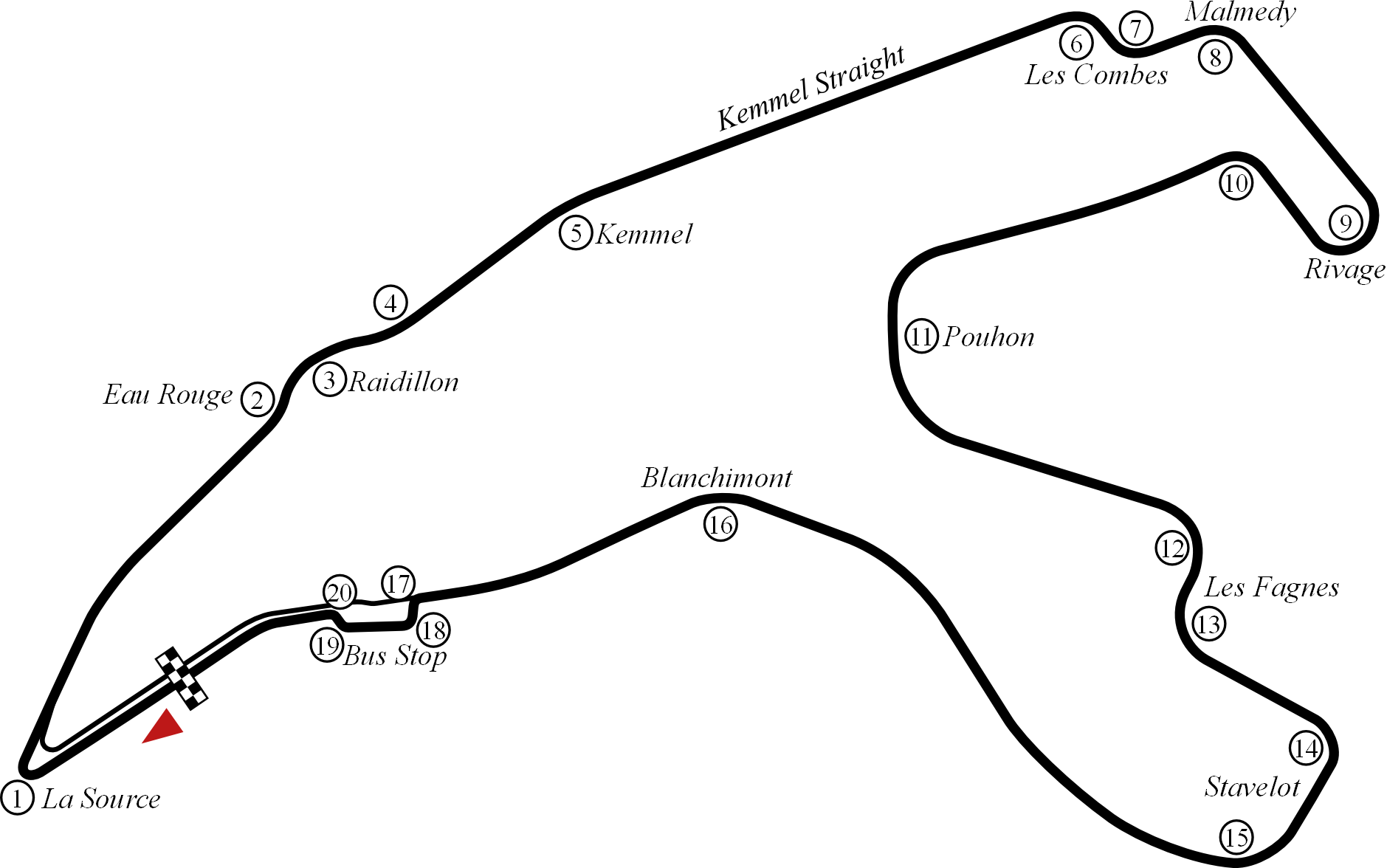

Race details
- Date: 1 September 2002
- Official name: 2002 Foster's Belgian Grand Prix
- Location: Circuit de Spa-Francorchamps, Francorchamps, Stavelot, Wallonia, Belgium
- Course: Permanent racing facility
- Course length: 6.968 km (4.330 miles)
- Distance: 44 laps, 306.355 km (190.360 miles)
- Weather: Cloudy, Air: 17 °C (63 °F), Track 25 °C (77 °F)

Pole position
Driver	(Germany) Michael Schumacher	Ferrari
- Time: 1:43.726

Fastest lap
Driver	(Germany) Michael Schumacher	Ferrari
- Time: 1:47.176 on lap 15 (lap record)

Podium
First	(Germany) Michael Schumacher	Ferrari
Second	(Brazil) Rubens Barrichello	Ferrari
Third	(Colombia) Juan Pablo Montoya	Williams-BMW

The 2002 Belgian Grand Prix (formally the 2002 Foster's Belgian Grand Prix) was a Formula One motor race held on 1 September 2002 at the Circuit de Spa-Francorchamps in Francorchamps, Stavelot, Wallonia, Belgium before 91,000 spectators. It was the 14th round of the 2002 Formula One World Championship and the 49th Belgian Grand Prix as part of the Formula One World Championship. Ferrari driver Michael Schumacher won the 44-lap race from pole position. His teammate Rubens Barrichello finished second and Williams' Juan Pablo Montoya claimed third.

Michael Schumacher, the World Drivers' Champion, started from pole position after setting the fastest qualifying lap during the one-hour qualifying session. Kimi Räikkönen of McLaren started second, with Barrichello starting third. At the start, Michael Schumacher maintained the race lead while Barrichello made a better start than Räikkönen to pass him for second. Michael Schumacher led the race for most of the race, only ceding it to Barrichello during the first pit stop cycle, leading to Ferrari's one-two finish. Michael Schumacher secured his tenth victory of the season and the 63rd of his career; he broke Nigel Mansell's record for most victories in one season, which he had previously tied three times.

The race result maintained Michael Schumacher's unassailable lead in the World Drivers' Championship with 122 championship points, 71 ahead of his teammate Barrichello and 78 in front of Montoya. Ferrari extended their unassailable World Constructors' Championship advantage over Williams to 87 championship points with three races remaining in the season.

== Background ==
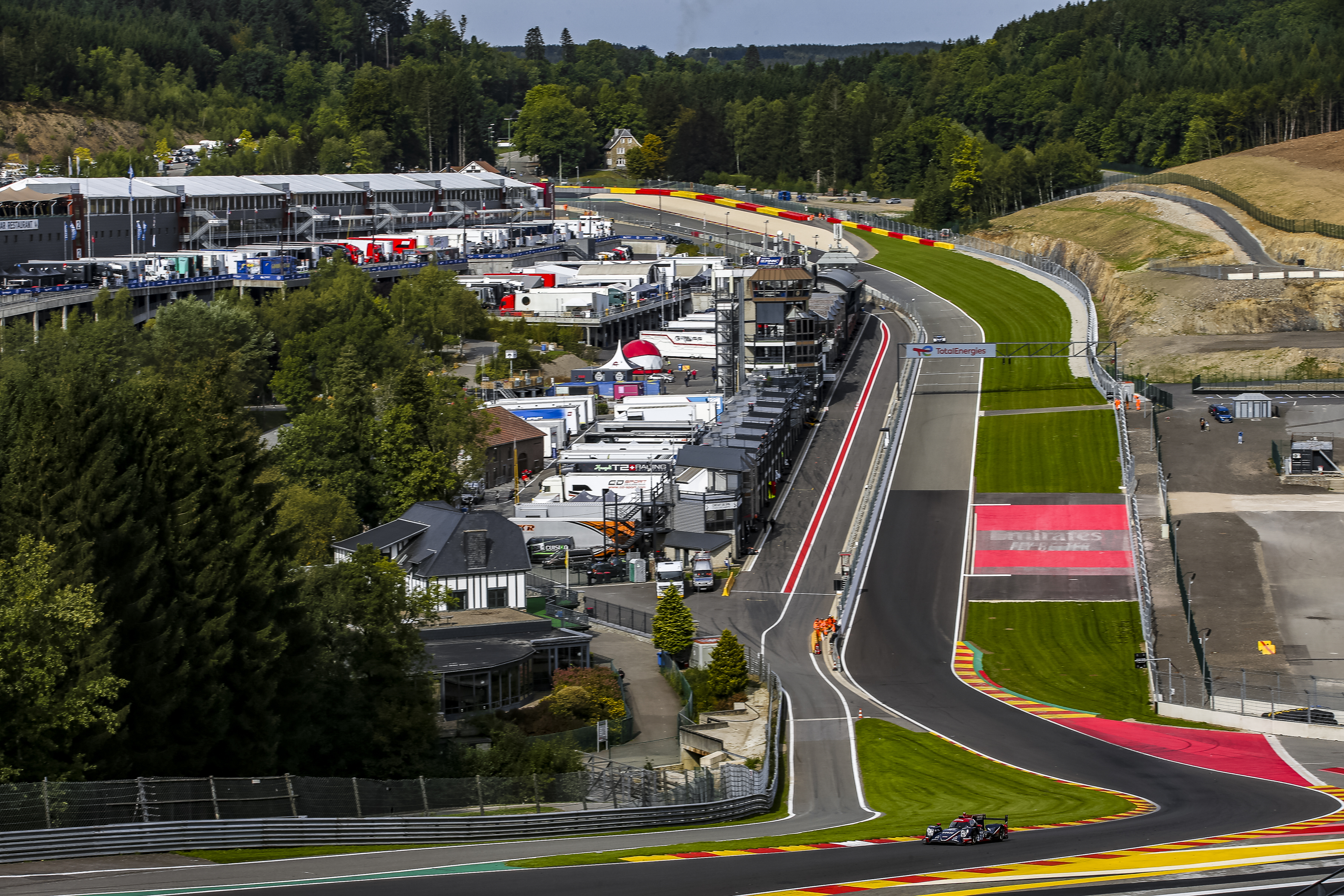
The Circuit de Spa-Francorchamps, where the Grand Prix was held

The 2002 Belgian Grand Prix was the 14th of the 17 races in the 2002 Formula One World Championship and the 49th time it was part of the Formula One World Championship. It took place at the 21-turn 6.968 km (4.330 mi) Circuit de Spa-Francorchamps in Francorchamps, Stavelot, Wallonia, Belgium on 1 September. For the Grand Prix, the exit of the Bus Stop chicane was modified to allow for a faster exit into the La Source turn. The new pit entrance was moved to right before the Bus Stop chicane end. The track was also resurfaced from La Source to Les Combes corners, as well as from Blanchimont to the Bus Stop chicane. The exit kerb at the top of Eau Rouge turn was flattened to make it quicker, causing drivers to straightline it on the way to Raidillon corner.

Before the race, both the World Drivers' Championship and World Constructors' Championship were already won, with Ferrari driver Michael Schumacher having secured the World Drivers' Championship three races earlier at the French Grand Prix and Ferrari took the World Constructors' Championship two races after that at the preceding Hungarian Grand Prix, with Williams too many championship points behind to be able to catch them. Although both titles were settled, the battle for second in the drivers' standings was not. Ferrari's Rubens Barrichello led the battle from Williams' Juan Pablo Montoya and Ralf Schumacher and McLaren's David Coulthard.

Michael Schumacher had won the Belgian Grand Prix five times and was aiming to become the first driver to win ten races in a single season, beating Nigel Mansell's record shared four times (1992). He added, "Of course, I have the best memories of Spa. I've spent so much time there during my career that I always enjoy returning." Barrichello hoped Ferrari would allow him to race against Michael Schumacher in the remaining four races, despite sporting director Jean Todt's indication to prohibit it if it went against Ferrari's interests. He felt finishing runner-up in the drivers' championship would be an improvement over the previous season, adding, "But to be honest it is much more important to win the races itself and then see you finish second in the championship more than anything else, but I would be lying to say it has no importance." Montoya rated Spa-Francorchamps as one of his favourite circuits and hoped it would be a good fit for the Williams squad, especially in dry conditions.

Ten constructors represented by a racing team entered two drivers each for the event. The Arrows team continued to struggle financially following a London High Court injunction that prevented them from selling important assets or attracting new investors, and it was possible that it would not compete in Belgium. Arrows were able to visit Belgium after an American investor reportedly agreed to purchase the team. However, the team withdrew from the race on the night of 30 August on the advice of lawyers due to difficulties in finalising legal procedures of the purchase before qualifying began. Anthony Davidson, British American Racing's (BAR) test driver, replaced regular driver Alex Yoong at Minardi for the second successive race before Yoong returned for the season's final three races.

Although there was no testing for the race, Ferrari's test driver Luca Badoer shook down three F2002 cars sent to Belgium at the Mugello Circuit, while Jaguar's Eddie Irvine shook down front suspension components at Silverstone Circuit for 50 km (31 mi). With four races remaining in the season, several teams reducing development of their 2002 vehicles and began focussing on their 2003-spec cars. In the absence of significant innovations, the teams' primary goal was to find the right balance between the high top speeds required for the Spa-Francorchamps circuit's long straights and the high aerodynamic load required by the second sector's fast corners, testing front and rear wings with varying numbers of profiles and incidence. Jaguar introduced the most important modifications, installing reworked components to the new front suspension on the R3B car in an attempt to address steering issues that its drivers had since the season began. Mercedes and Toyota introduced revised specifications of their V10 engines.

== Practice ==
Two one-hour practice sessions on Friday and two 45-minute sessions on Saturday preceded the race. Race organisers delayed the first practice session for an hour due to heavy fog, preventing the medical helicopter from landing at nearby hospitals in the case of an accident, shortening the session from an hour to half an hour. Conditions were sunny for the first session. Barrichello lapped fastest at 1:49.009 with two minutes remaining. His teammate Michael Schumacher, Coulthard, Renault's Jarno Trulli, Coulthard's teammate Kimi Räikkönen, Irvine, Jordan's Takuma Sato, Trulli's teammate Jenson Button, Toyota's Mika Salo and Ralf Schumacher followed in the top ten. Michael Schumacher ran wide onto the grass at the fast Pouhon left-hand turn and nearly crashed at high speed, whereas Räikkönen ran onto the grass on the outside before entering the left-hand Blanchimont curve but avoided a crash. BAR's Olivier Panis had an engine failure into Les Combes turn in the final minute; a new Honda V10 engine was fitted in his car by mechanics in 42 minutes.

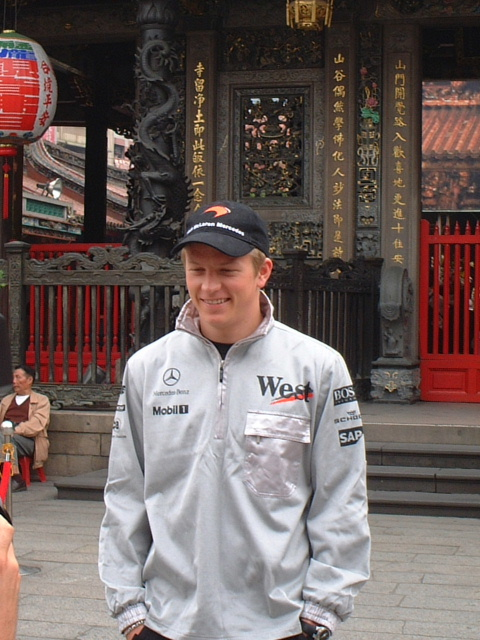
Kimi Räikkönen lapped fastest overall in the Friday free practice sessions

Lap times fell during the second practice session, which took place later in the afternoon under sunny skies. Räikkönen set the day's quickest lap of 1:47.196 in the final ten minutes. Coulthard was second and was fastest until his teammate's best lap. The Ferrari duo of Michael Schumacher and Barrichello, Ralf Schumacher, Button, Jaguar's Pedro de la Rosa, Montoya, Irvine and Salo completed the top ten. Montoya ran off the circuit three times throughout the session. On the second occasion, he lost control of his car's rear approaching Fagnes corner but he avoided hitting the tyre barrier by passing through the gravel trap and returning to the pit lane. Mark Webber stopped his Minardi car at La Source turn with gearbox issues after 25 minutes. De la Rosa stopped his Jaguar when an electrical glitch caused his engine to cut out at the pit lane entry, forcing him to push his car into pit lane. With seven minutes left, Barrichello attempted to go fastest when he spun into the gravel trap at the exit of Malmedy corner, ending his session early.

The third practice session took place in sunny conditions on Saturday morning. Michael Schumacher set the track's first sub-1:45 lap at 1:44.951 with a minute left, 0.888 seconds ahead of his teammate Barrichello in second. The McLaren duo of Räikkönen and Coulthard, the Williams pair of Ralf Schumacher and Montoya, Toyota's Allan McNish, Panis, Button and Jordan's Giancarlo Fisichella were in positions three to ten. Webber stopped at Stavelot turn with an electrical issue between the gearbox and engine. His teammate Davidson stopped when his engine cut out and was pushed into the pit lane by marshals. BAR's Jacques Villeneuve removed a bargeboard from his car on a kerb. Felipe Massa locked his brakes into Malmedy corner and ran onto the grass but his Sauber car was undamaged.

Clouds formed over the circuit for the final practice session later in the morning. Räikkönen lapped fastest at 1:44.870 on a new set of tyres after 29 minutes, demoting Michael Schumacher to second. Coulthard, Barrichello, the Williams pair of Montoya and Ralf Schumacher, Salo, Panis, De la Rosa and Button rounded out the top ten. Michael Schumacher and Ralf Schumacher both spun their cars at Malmedy and Les Combes corners, but both continued. Davidson went off the track into Stavelot corner but continued.

== Qualifying ==
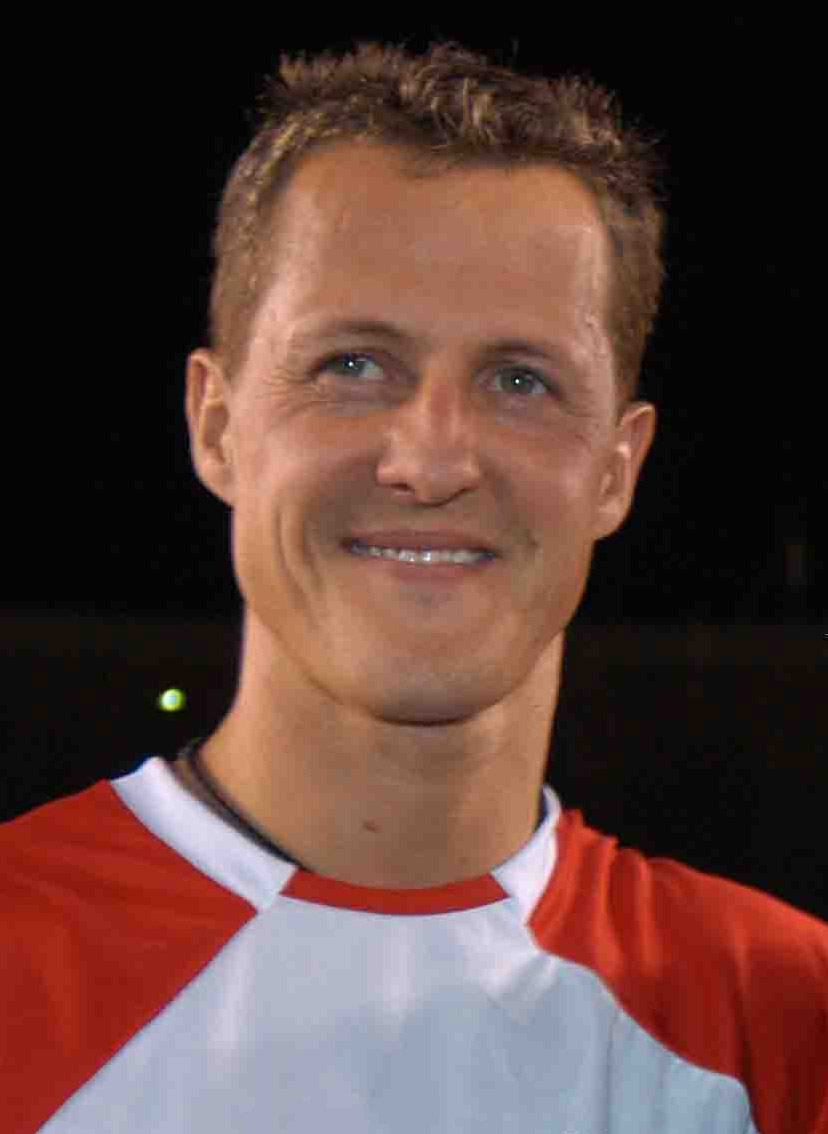
Michael Schumacher (pictured in 2005), the 2002 World Drivers' Championship, who qualified on pole position and went on to win the race the following day.

Each driver was allowed twelve laps during Saturday's one-hour qualifying session, with starting positions determined by the drivers' quickest laps. During this session, the 107% rule was in effect, requiring each driver to remain within 107% of the quickest lap time in order to qualify for the race. Although there were forecasts for rain, it was dry and cloudy for qualifying. Michael Schumacher changed his gearbox before qualifying and a spare Ferrari was ready for him if needed. With ten minutes remaining, he won his fifth pole of the season and 48th of his career with a lap time of 1:43.726, the track's first sub-1:44 lap. Schumacher aborted his second run because of oil laid on the circuit by Panis's car, prompting the waving of oil flags. Räikkönen qualified second for the first time in his career, 0.424 seconds slower, steadily improving during qualifying. He was the early pacesetter and set his best time on his final run, going onto the grass with his right rear wheel over the kerb at the Pouhon left-hand curve and lifting dust in the second sector. On his second run, Räikkönen drove through dense smoke from Panis' car on the straight after the Eau Rouge turn. Barrichello used the harder Bridgestone tyre compound and took third, the slower Ferrari driver, after the Minardi cars affected his quickest lap. He was unable to set a fourth quick lap after testing a racing setup tweak, reporting no improvement. The Williams pair were fourth and fifth; both drivers reported car balance issues. Ralf Schumacher took fourth in the final minute. Montoya was unable to remove excess understeer; he was impeded by the slow moving Räikkönen on the racing line at the Bus Stop chicane before moving onto the escape road on his third run, leading to an expletive-laden radio rant. Coulthard selected the harder Michelin tyre compound, causing him to be off the pace owing to less grip and took sixth. Trulli qualified seventh after failing to complete his fourth run due to a pit lane issue. Irvine qualified a season-best eighth. He reported his Jaguar appeared to be extracting the maximum performance from the tyres. Toyota made minor changes to Salo's car and tyre pressure adjustments for his final run to qualify ninth. Button qualified three places behind his teammate Trulli in tenth. Renault removed too much downforce from his racing setup for the last two runs and Villeneuve spun ahead of him on the third.

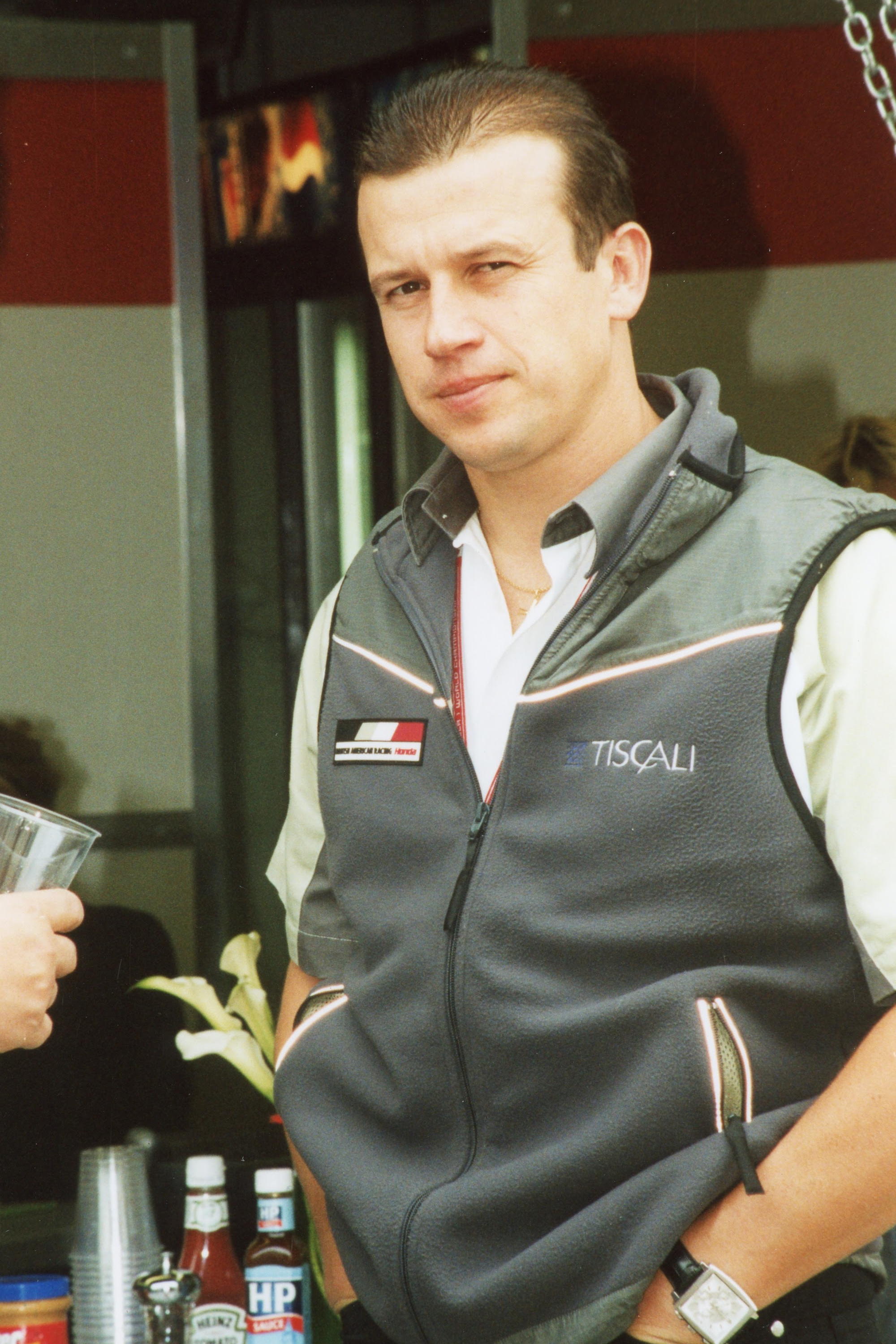
Olivier Panis suffered one of five engine failures by Honda-powered cars.

Although De la Rosa did not need to change his Jaguar midway through qualifying, he locked the front wheels on his third run entering La Source turn and cancelled his last run due to a driver error, taking 11th. Villeneuve was 12th in a slippery car. On his second run, he ran wide and spun backwards off the racing line to avoid a slowing Sauber car at Pouhon turn late in qualifying. McNish, 13th, made a mistake by failing to locate the correct tyre pressure for his last run while Toyota spent qualifying working on his racing setup. Fisichella oversteered, putting his left-rear wheel onto the kerb braking heavily for the downhill right-hand Fagnes turn and hit the tyre wall with 20 minutes remaining. He returned to the pit lane to drive the spare Jordan car, returning to the track late in qualifying to claim 14th. Panis had his second engine failure of the meeting on his second run, 35 minutes in, when he approached Les Combes corner. Thick smoke billowed fro his car and oil was laid on the circuit. Panis returned to the pit lane for the final 20 minutes, driving the spare BAR car and qualifying 15th due to traffic. Sato, 16th, reported his car required extra grip and stability. Sauber secured the grid's ninth row. Massa finished 17th, with significant understeer in slow and medium-speed curves and snap oversteer in high-speed corners. He could not lap quicker due to traffic. Heidfeld, 18th, locked up and went wide at Les Combes corner in his second run. He then had engine setting issues on his third lap, which was fixed, but had too much oversteer in the last sector on his final run. Minardi took the final starting positions in 19th and 20th. Webber was six-tenths of a second faster than his teammate Davidson, who had his car modified for the first run before being baulked by Panis on the final run. This meant all 20 entrants qualified for the race.

=== Post-qualifying ===
After qualifying, Fédération Internationale de l'Automobile (FIA; Formula One's governing body) delegate Charlie Whiting agreed to the Grand Prix Drivers' Association's request at a drivers' briefing to remove on-track painted advertisements due to the hazards they posed, particularly in wet weather.

=== Qualifying classification ===
Pos	No	Driver	Constructor	Lap	Gap	Grid
1	1	(Germany) Michael Schumacher	Ferrari	1:43.726	—	1
2	4	(Finland) Kimi Räikkönen	McLaren-Mercedes	1:44.150	+0.424	2
3	2	(Brazil) Rubens Barrichello	Ferrari	1:44.335	+0.609	3
4	5	(Germany) Ralf Schumacher	Williams-BMW	1:44.348	+0.622	4
5	6	(Colombia) Juan Pablo Montoya	Williams-BMW	1:44.634	+0.908	5
6	3	(United Kingdom) David Coulthard	McLaren-Mercedes	1:44.759	+1.033	6
7	14	(Italy) Jarno Trulli	Renault	1:45.386	+1.660	7
8	16	(United Kingdom) Eddie Irvine	Jaguar-Cosworth	1:45.865	+2.139	8
9	24	(Finland) Mika Salo	Toyota	1:45.880	+2.154	9
10	15	(United Kingdom) Jenson Button	Renault	1:45.972	+2.246	10
11	17	(Spain) Pedro de la Rosa	Jaguar-Cosworth	1:46.056	+2.330	11
12	11	(Canada) Jacques Villeneuve	BAR-Honda	1:46.403	+2.677	12
13	25	(United Kingdom) Allan McNish	Toyota	1:46.485	+2.759	13
14	9	(Italy) Giancarlo Fisichella	Jordan-Honda	1:46.508	+2.782	14
15	12	(France) Olivier Panis	BAR-Honda	1:46.553	+2.827	15
16	10	(Japan) Takuma Sato	Jordan-Honda	1:46.875	+3.149	16
17	8	(Brazil) Felipe Massa	Sauber-Petronas	1:46.896	+3.170	17
18	7	(Germany) Nick Heidfeld	Sauber-Petronas	1:47.272	+3.546	18
19	23	(Australia) Mark Webber	Minardi-Asiatech	1:47.562	+3.836	19
20	22	(United Kingdom) Anthony Davidson	Minardi-Asiatech	1:48.170	+4.444	20
107% time: 1:50.987

== Warm-up ==
On race morning, drivers were given a half-hour warm-up session to run installation laps in their race and spare cars in dry and sunny conditions. Heavy rain fell overnight, removing the rubber and therefore grip laid down by drivers. Michael Schumacher set the fastest lap of 1:48.044 halfway through warm-up, almost a second faster than Räikkönen. Coulthard, De la Rosa, Barrichello, Trulli, Panis, Ralf Schumacher, Villeneuve and Heidfeld made up positions third to tenth. Massa damaged his car against a marker cone at the Bus Stop chicane. Halfway through warm-up, Sato ran wide leaving Stavelot corner and spun after two wheels hit the grass. Although he was able to straighten his car out after spinning, Sato ran out of space and damaged the front-left suspension against the tyre barrier. Marshals removed Sato's stricken car from the track.

== Race ==
The 44-lap race commenced at 14:00 local time, in dull and overcast weather; teams expected conditions to remain dry. The air temperature was between 15 and 17 °C (59 and 63 °F) and the asphalt temperature was between 18 and 20 °C (64 and 68 °F). The race attracted 91,000 spectators. When the red lights went out to begin the race, Michael Schumacher made a clean start to maintain the lead into the La Source hairpin. Räikkönen had a poor start and sought to block Barrichello by driving to the right, but the latter pushed Räikkönen outwards and passed him on the inside for second into turn one. This caused a minor traffic jam as Ralf Schumacher chose to go around both Räikkönen and Barrichello, but was blocked by Räikkönen and passed by his teammate Montoya. Coulthard was the least effected by the traffic jam and moved to the inside after Trulli ran wide on the outside of the hairpin after unintentionally pressing the neutral button on his steering wheel. He slipstreamed past and braked later than Ralf Schumacher to move into fifth at Les Combes turn. Heidfeld had the best start, gaining three places by the end of the first lap, but Villeneuve lost three positions over the same distance.

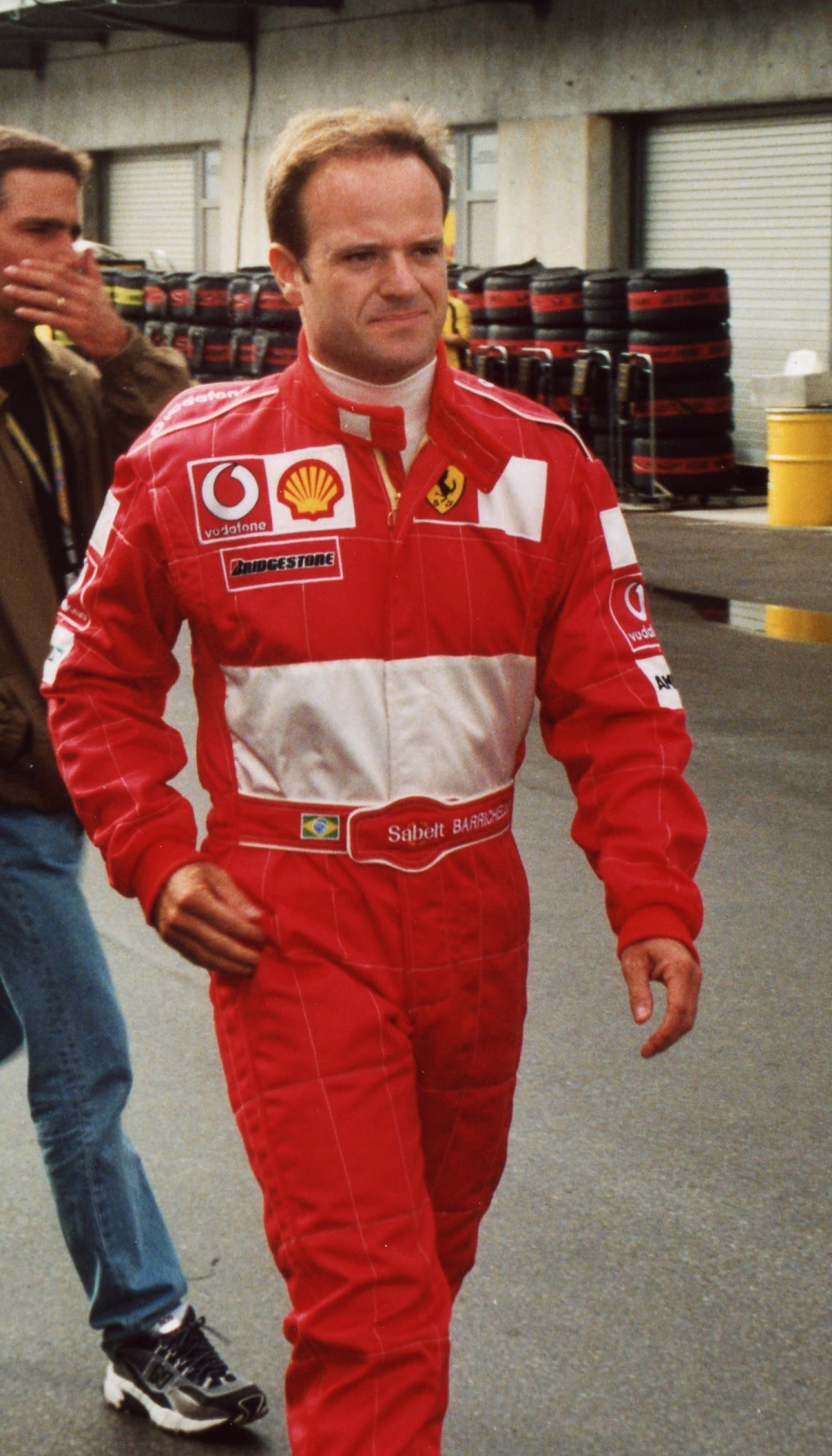
Rubens Barrichello finished in second, 1.9 seconds behind his teammate.

Michael Schumacher had a 2.2-second lead over his teammate Barrichello after the first lap. They were followed by Räikkönen, Montoya, Coulthard and Ralf Schumacher. Räikkönen ran wide on lap two in the second part of the quick downhill left-hand Pouhon corner, but regained control of his McLaren after a broadside. Montoya took advantage of the error and passed Räikkönen for third. By lap five, the two Ferrari drivers had pulled away from the rest of the field, nine seconds ahead of Montoya. On the same lap, Webber retired at Eau Rouge turn due to gearbox failure, becoming the race's first retiree. Massa overtook his teammate Heidfeld for 15th into Les Combes turn. On lap seven, Villeneuve considered passing Fisichella at La Source, but he was too far away. Fisichella then appeared to conduct two illegal manoeuvres to keep Villeneuve behind at Les Combes corner. On lap eight, Villeneuve forced Fisichella into cutting the Bus Stop chicane and passed him for 13th at La Source. Massa used the situation to pass Massa for 14th on the straight after Radillion turn. On lap 11, Button pulled off the track into Fagnes corner due to an unspecified engine issue. Villeneuve gained on McNish and braked later than him for 11th on the inside through Les Combes corner three laps later.

The first round of pit stops began on lap 15. Michael Schumacher made his first pit stop from the race lead on lap 16. His 8.6-second pit stop saw him rejoin the race in second, 11 seconds behind his teammate Barrichello. On lap 17, Ralf Schumacher spun into the grass at Les Combes turn, losing sixth place to Trulli. Barrichello entered the pit lane on the same lap. His stop was slow due to a fuel nozzle malfunction, which meant it was momentarily stuck, and was stationary for 10.2 seconds. He fell to fifth, behind Montoya, Räikkönen and Coulthard. Montoya and Räikkönen made their first pit stops on lap 18, moving Coulthard to second and Barrichello to third. Montoya remained ahead of Räikkönen because McLaren put more fuel into his car. That same lap, Davidson understeered at the Pouhon turn, which he entered too quickly and spun into the gravel trap, putting two wheels on the kerbing, causing him to lose grip. On lap 19, Coulthard entered the pit lane, and after an 8.2-second stop, he rejoined in fourth, ahead of Räikkönen but behind Montoya. Fisichella was the only driver who used a one-stop strategy with the goal of gaining him positions, making his pit stop from sixth on lap 22. He dropped to 15th, moving Trulli to sixth.

The race order following the first round of pit stops was Michael Schumacher, Barrichello, Montoya, Coulthard, Räikkönen and Trulli. The ensuing laps were processional, with little action on the track. Michael Schumacher's race lead over teammate Barrichello increased to 25 seconds, with Montoya almost a minute behind Schumacher by lap 30. Meanwhile, McNish ran slightly sideways through La Source on lap 22, and Massa failed to pass him. The second round of pit stops commenced on lap 28. Michael Schumacher made his second pit stop from the race lead two laps later. He returned to the circuit just behind his teammate Barrichello. Michael Schumacher retook the lead when Barrichello's second scheduled pit stop occurred at the end of lap 31. Barrichello returned to the track in second. After his second pit stop on lap 32, Ralf Schumacher accidentally pressed the wrong button on the steering wheel when leaving the Williams pit stall, losing him time and dropping him to ninth. Montoya's second stop was on lap 34, briefly moving Coulthard to third and demoting Montoya to fifth. Räikkönen made his second pit stop on lap 35, falling to fifth behind Montoya. Coulthard, his teammate, made his second pit stop on lap 36 and rejoined the track in fourth, behind Montoya.

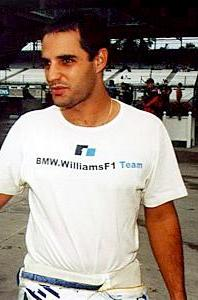
Juan Pablo Montoya held off David Coulthard of McLaren in the final laps to finish in third.

On lap 36, while battling Montoya for third, Räikkönen's engine failed heading towards Les Combes turn, and he retired with smoke spewing from his McLaren's rear. On the following lap, Trulli stopped off the track into Blanchimont corner due to an engine issue. His and Räikkönen's retirements promoted Ralf Schumacher into fifth and Irvine into the final points-paying position of sixth. There were two retirements on lap 38. Massa's engine failed on the start/finish straight, so he pulled off to the side of the circuit. De la Rosa's right-rear suspension failed at high speed, sending him off the track at Les Combes corner, but he was able to stop the Jaguar from hitting the tyre barrier. Fisichella's engine failed on the straight between the Radillion and Les Combes turns on lap 40, and he retired with smoke and flames bursting from his car. Panis' engine failed on the next lap, with smoke billowing from his vehicle's rear at the end of the straight as he approached Les Combes corner.

Michael Schumacher slowed down in response to a series of engine issues in the final laps. His 25.8-second lead over teammate Barrichello had been reduced to 1.9 seconds by the time he was the first driver to cross the start/finish line, securing his tenth victory out of the season's 14 races and 63rd of his career. He broke Mansell's record for most victories in a season, which he had previously shared three times. His teammate Barrichello finished 1.977 seconds behind in second; Ferrari achieved a 50th consecutive podium finish extending back to the 1999 Malaysian Grand Prix. Montoya finished third, nearly nine-tenths of a second ahead of Coulthard in fourth, as Coulthard went faster in the last laps with improved grip after his second pit stop due to more rubber on the track. Ralf Schumacher secured fifth. Irvine finished sixth to earn the final championship point, his and Jaguar's first points score since the season-opening Australian Grand Prix. Salo was seventh, half a second behind Irvine. Villeneuve recovered from a slow start to finish eighth. McNish finished ninth, with a wheel sensor failure. Heidfeld, 10th, was off the pace despite improved handling and reliability. Sato was the final finisher in 11th despite a recalcitrant right-rear wheel nut delaying his first pit stop and nervous handling. 11 out of the 20 starters finished the race.

=== Post-race ===
The top three drivers appeared on the podium to collect their trophies and spoke to the media in the subsequent press conference. Michael Schumacher agreed that it appeared to be the "perfect race" from an external point of view, "I think we haven't really expected anything like that. We were optimistic. We had a very good weekend altogether but you never know what is going to happen in the race with the temperature and so on with different tyres." Barrichello thought it was "a good weekend" despite issues with the racing setup from the Friday free practice sessions, and he was pleased to extend his hold on second in the World Drivers' Championship. Montoya described it as "a pretty hard race, I think especially at the beginning" because of the pressure he was put under by the McLaren team. He talked about his late-race battle with Coulthard, "It was close. I think we had very similar pace, he had a bit of an advantage down the straights because he was just drafting along."

Mansell said he had no issue losing his most wins in a season record to Michael Schumacher, "He's done a fantastic job, as have Ferrari. Their car not only has the speed but also the reliability. It's phenomenal." Ferrari sporting director Jean Todt called the result "a dream race, yet another this year. Everything went perfectly – the car, the engine, the Bridgestone tyres, the drivers and the team." Coulthard said of finishing fourth, "It's a pity that we couldn't achieve a better result today. My car was not so good in the middle sector and that's why I couldn't get close enough to actually get past Montoya." He added his second pit stop allowed him to gain ground on Montoya. Ralf Schumacher said he could "only be reasonably satisfied today as I made a few mistakes" because he was baulked by Räikkönen at the start and later lost control of his car at Les Combes corner. Irvine commented on finishing sixth, "We did everything right this weekend, from qualifying well to our race preparation and strategy: This is reward for that good work." He added he was happy to score one championship point because it helped Jaguar's standing in the World Constructors' Championship.

McLaren CEO Ron Dennis explained that the reduced asphalt temperatures were the primary reason McLaren's qualifying form did not carry over into the race. Räikkönen said his engine failure late in the race was "not the ideal way to end the weekend, but it's one of those things." Honda suffered five engine problems during the event. Their race and team test manager Shuhei Nakamoto called it "the weekend from hell and I'm just glad it's all over. We've got a lot of work to do before Monza..." Fisichella characterised his engine failure as "very scary" and stated his one-stop strategy appeared to be ideal until he retired from the race. Michael Schumacher maintained his lead in the World Drivers' Championship with 122 championship points, 71 ahead of his teammate Barrichello and 78 in front of Montoya. Ferrari increased their advantage in the World Constructors' Championship to 87 championship points over Williams and 116 in front of McLaren with three races remaining in the season.

=== Race classification ===
Drivers who scored championship points are denoted in bold.

Pos	No	Driver	Constructor	Tyre	Laps	Time/Retired	Grid	Points
1	1	(Germany) **Michael Schumacher**	**Ferrari**	B	44	1:21:20.634	1	10
2	2	(Brazil) **Rubens Barrichello**	**Ferrari**	B	44	+ 1.977	3	6
3	6	(Colombia) **Juan Pablo Montoya**	**Williams-BMW**	M	44	+ 18.445	5	4
4	3	(United Kingdom) **David Coulthard**	**McLaren-Mercedes**	M	44	+ 19.357	6	3
5	5	(Germany) **Ralf Schumacher**	**Williams-BMW**	M	44	+ 56.440	4	2
6	16	(United Kingdom) **Eddie Irvine**	**Jaguar-Cosworth**	M	44	+ 1:17.370	8	1
7	24	(Finland) Mika Salo	Toyota	M	44	+ 1:17.809	9	
8	11	(Canada) Jacques Villeneuve	BAR-Honda	B	44	+ 1:19.855	12	
9	25	(United Kingdom) Allan McNish	Toyota	M	43	+ 1 Lap	13	
10	7	(Germany) Nick Heidfeld	Sauber-Petronas	B	43	+ 1 Lap	18	
11	10	(Japan) Takuma Sato	Jordan-Honda	B	43	+ 1 Lap	16	
12	12	(France) Olivier Panis	BAR-Honda	B	39	Engine	15	
Ret	9	(Italy) Giancarlo Fisichella	Jordan-Honda	B	38	Engine	14	
Ret	17	(Spain) Pedro de la Rosa	Jaguar-Cosworth	M	37	Suspension	11	
Ret	8	(Brazil) Felipe Massa	Sauber-Petronas	B	37	Engine	17	
Ret	4	(Finland) Kimi Räikkönen	McLaren-Mercedes	M	35	Engine	2	
Ret	14	(Italy) Jarno Trulli	Renault	M	35	Engine	7	
Ret	22	(United Kingdom) Anthony Davidson	Minardi-Asiatech	M	17	Spun Off	20	
Ret	15	(United Kingdom) Jenson Button	Renault	M	10	Engine	10	
Ret	23	(Australia) Mark Webber	Minardi-Asiatech	M	4	Gearbox	19	

== Championship standings after the race ==
Drivers' Championship standings

+/–	Pos	Driver	Points
	1	(Germany) Michael Schumacher*	122
	2	(Brazil) Rubens Barrichello	51
1	3	(Colombia) Juan Pablo Montoya	44
1	4	(Germany) Ralf Schumacher	42
	5	(United Kingdom) David Coulthard	37

Constructors' Championship standings

+/–	Pos	Constructor	Points
	1	(Italy) Ferrari*	173
	2	(United Kingdom) Williams-BMW	86
	3	(United Kingdom) McLaren-Mercedes	57
	4	(France) Renault	15
	5	(Switzerland) Sauber-Petronas	11
Sources:

- Note: Only the top five positions are included for both sets of standings.
- Bold text and an asterisk indicates the 2002 World Champions.

Previous race: 2002 Hungarian Grand Prix	FIA Formula One World Championship; 2002 season	Next race: 2002 Italian Grand Prix
Previous race: 2001 Belgian Grand Prix	Belgian Grand Prix	Next race: 2004 Belgian Grand Prix
