= Spa-Francorchamps Formula 2 round =

(Belgium) Spa-Francorchamps Formula 2 round

FIA Formula 2 Championship
- Venue: Circuit de Spa-Francorchamps
- Location: Stavelot, Belgium
- First race: 2017
- Most wins (driver): (Australia) Jack Doohan (2)
- Most wins (team): (United Kingdom) Invicta Racing (4)
- Lap record: 1:59.029 ( (Estonia) Paul Aron, (United Kingdom) Hitech Pulse-Eight, Dallara F2 2024, 2024)

The Spa-Francorchamps Formula 2 round is a FIA Formula 2 Championship series race that is run on the Circuit de Spa-Francorchamps in Stavelot, Belgium.

== Winners ==
Year	Race	Driver	Team	Report
2017	Feature	(Russia) Artem Markelov	Russian Time	Report
2017	Sprint	(Brazil) Sérgio Sette Câmara	MP Motorsport	Report
2018	Feature	(Netherlands) Nyck de Vries	Pertamina Prema Theodore Racing	Report
2018	Sprint	(Canada) Nicholas Latifi	DAMS	Report
2019	Feature	Race cancelled due to fatal accident of Anthoine Hubert		Report
2019	Sprint	Race cancelled due to fatal accident of Anthoine Hubert		Report
2020	Feature	(Japan) Yuki Tsunoda	Carlin	Report
2020	Sprint	(Russia) Robert Shwartzman	Prema Racing	Report
2022	Sprint	(New Zealand) Liam Lawson	Carlin	Report
2022	Feature	(Australia) Jack Doohan	Virtuosi Racing	Report
2023	Sprint	(Brazil) Enzo Fittipaldi	Rodin Carlin	Report
2023	Feature	(Australia) Jack Doohan	Invicta Virtuosi Racing	Report
2024	Sprint	(United Kingdom) Zak O'Sullivan	ART Grand Prix	Report
2024	Feature	(France) Isack Hadjar	Campos Racing	Report
2025	Sprint	(Italy) Leonardo Fornaroli	Invicta Racing	Report
2025	Feature	(Czech Republic) Roman Staněk	Invicta Racing	Report
2026	Sprint	(Paraguay) Joshua Dürksen	Invicta Racing	Report
2026	Feature	(Brazil) Rafael Camara	Invicta Racing	Report

== See also ==
- Belgian Grand Prix
- Spa-Francorchamps GP2 round
