= 2021 Belgian Grand Prix =

12th round of the 2021 Formula One World Championship

Race 12 of 22 (Note: At the start of the event Formula One planned to hold twenty-three Grands Prix.) in the 2021 Formula One World Championship
← Previous race	Next race →
- Layout of the Circuit de Spa-Francorchamps

Race details
- Date: 29 August 2021
- Official name: Formula 1 Rolex Belgian Grand Prix 2021
- Location: Circuit de Spa-Francorchamps, Stavelot, Belgium
- Course: Permanent racing facility
- Course length: 7.004 km (4.352 miles)
- Distance: 1 lap, 6.880 km (4.275 miles)
- Scheduled distance: 44 laps, 308.052 km (191.415 miles)
- Weather: Very Wet, persistent rain
- Attendance: 213,000

Pole position
Driver	(Netherlands) Max Verstappen	Red Bull Racing-Honda
- Time: 1:59.765

Fastest lap
Driver	Not recognised	
- Time: None

Podium
First	(Netherlands) Max Verstappen	Red Bull Racing-Honda
Second	(United Kingdom) George Russell	Williams-Mercedes
Third	(United Kingdom) Lewis Hamilton	Mercedes

The 2021 Belgian Grand Prix (officially known as the Formula 1 Rolex Belgian Grand Prix 2021) was a Formula One motor race held on 29 August 2021 at the Circuit de Spa-Francorchamps. It was the 12th round of the 2021 Formula One World Championship. The race was also the 77th overall running of the Belgian Grand Prix, the 66th time the event was run as part of the Formula One World Championship, and the 54th World Championship Belgian Grand Prix held at the Spa circuit. The race was won by Max Verstappen, ahead of George Russell and Lewis Hamilton.

The race was planned to run for 44 laps, but ended during the third lap due to wet conditions. Laps one and two took place behind the safety car before a red flag stopped the race on lap three. The sporting regulations required the results be taken from the end of lap one, with half points given to drivers who finished in the top 10 positions as less than 75% of the originally scheduled race distance had been completed.

As of 2026, it holds the record for the shortest Formula One World Championship race in terms of distance (6.880 km (4.275 mi)) and number of laps raced (1). This beats the previous short-distance record of 52.920 km (32.883 mi) set at the 1991 Australian Grand Prix and the fewest laps record, 12, set at the 1971 German Grand Prix. The race was also marked the first time since the 2009 Malaysian Grand Prix that half points were awarded, the sixth time this occurred in Formula One. Regulation changes for the 2022 season meant that half-points could no longer be awarded in subsequent seasons. The decision to run two laps behind the safety car and red flagging the race on lap three stirred much controversy. The FIA and then race director Michael Masi were criticised by media, fans, teams and drivers for their decision-making during the weekend, and particularly on race day.

This was the only World Championship race not to have any running under full green flag conditions. The lack of green flag running led many commentators to question the validity and sporting integrity of officially classifying and awarding points when the only laps completed were behind the safety car with no overtaking permitted. Some commentators and competitors accused Formula One of putting commercial interests above those of paying spectators and fans in general by not abandoning the event with no race result, and not giving spectators a partial ticket refund. Other commentators and competitors felt the awarding of half points was justified to reward competitors who had qualified well, even if the race scenario was not ideal.

In response to the negative reactions, the sport set about finding suitable methods of preventing a repeat scenario. It was decided to change the sporting regulations, which from 2022 onwards state a race must involve a minimum of two laps under green flag without a safety car or virtual safety car for points to be awarded. Subsequent changes in point structure for shortened races from 2022 meant that reduced points would be awarded to fewer drivers (depending on distance covered) in cases where a race ends under a red flag. Following confusion over how points were awarded at the subsequent 2022 Japanese Grand Prix this regulation was tweaked further for 2023 to ensure that the number of points allocated was purely based on percentage distance raced irrespective of whether a race finishes under red or green flag conditions. Additionally, since 2022, Formula One has been exploring how to improve the raceability of cars in wet conditions in an attempt to reduce the need for safety cars and red flags in wet conditions. In 2023 Pirelli announced they have introduced a new Full Wet tyre compound to improve racing conditions during wet conditions, not requiring tire blankets. This new blanketless full wet was raced for the first time at the 2023 Monaco Grand Prix. Pirelli has also subsequently proposed the addition of either a third wet weather tyre compound be added to their tyre range or to be introduced as a single wet tyre with improved performance and consistency across different levels of on track wetness- to help improve racing in wet conditions. However an attempt to introduce 'spray guards' to help achieve this objective was unsuccessful and has subsequently been abandoned.

== Background ==
The event, which was held over the weekend of 27–29 August at the Circuit de Spa-Francorchamps, was the 12th round of the 2021 Formula One World Championship after a four-week summer break. It marked the sixty-sixth time the Belgian Grand Prix appeared on the season calendar. It rained throughout the weekend which excited some drivers. Mick Schumacher stated that he was "looking forward to getting onto some rain", while Lando Norris said that he was "hoping for a bit of rain" in the race. Nikita Mazepin stated that he "hope[s] it's dry."

This Grand Prix was the first to enforce article 12.8.4 of Formula One technical regulations, which stated "devices which are used to fit or remove wheel fasteners may only be powered by compressed air or nitrogen. Any sensor systems may only act passively." Wheel guns came with sensors that informed mechanics when the wheel was securely fastened. Some teams designed their wheel guns to send this signal in anticipation of the wheel being fastened, mitigating reaction time and resulting in quicker service. The governing body deemed this practice unsafe, as it meant cars were potentially released from the pit stop without the wheels being securely fastened. The new technical directive banned this practice and new tolerance parameters were introduced to enforce the rule. A 0.15 second period between the tyres being securely fastened and the dropping of the jack, and a 0.2 second period from the dropping of the jack to the car being released by the pit crew. This made any benefits of the outlawed practices obsolete. In a further clarification, it was revealed the FIA could ensure adherence to the new tolerance limits by using an intelligent wheel gun. The change was originally planned for the Hungarian Grand Prix, but was postponed to this race.

=== Championship standings before the race ===
Following the 2021 Hungarian Grand Prix one month earlier, Lewis Hamilton led the Drivers' Championship by 8 points from Max Verstappen. Lando Norris, Valtteri Bottas and Sergio Pérez were third, fourth and fifth, respectively. Mercedes led the Constructors' Championship by 12 points from Red Bull Racing. Scuderia Ferrari were third and McLaren fourth, each with 163 points (140 points behind Mercedes).

=== Entrants ===
The drivers and teams were the same as the season entry list with no additional stand-in drivers for the race. The entry list contained five former winners of the Belgian Grand Prix, these being Lewis Hamilton (with wins in 2010, 2015, 2017 and 2020), Kimi Räikkönen (with wins in 2004, 2005, 2007 and 2009), Sebastian Vettel (with wins in 2011, 2013 and 2018), Charles Leclerc (who won in 2019) and Daniel Ricciardo (who won in 2014) for whom this race was also a 200th Grand Prix start.

=== Tyre choices ===
Sole tyre supplier Pirelli allocated the C2, C3, and C4 compounds of tyre to be used in the race.

=== Penalties ===
After causing collisions at the previous race, Valtteri Bottas and Lance Stroll each received a five-place grid penalty for the Grand Prix.

== Practice ==
Free practice 1 took place on 27 August at 11:30 CEST and ended without major incident. Yuki Tsunoda and Kimi Räikkönen spun at La Source in separate incidents. Räikkönen also hit the inside pit wall, ending his session. Charles Leclerc ran wide at turn 7, but was able to recover without incident. The Mercedes of Valtteri Bottas was fastest, followed by Red Bull Racing's Max Verstappen, and Scuderia AlphaTauri's Pierre Gasly. Championship leader Lewis Hamilton finished in 18th, after his lap was impeded by a slow Nicholas Latifi.

Free practice 2 took place at 15:00 CEST on the same day. The session was interrupted by two incidents, both resulting in red flags. First, Leclerc lost control over the rear end on the exit of Les Combes and crashed into the wall, ending his session. Verstappen had an incident at Malmedy, also losing control of the rear and hitting the wall. Esteban Ocon also spun, but was able to recover and return to the pits. Verstappen finished fastest, with Bottas in second and Hamilton in third.

Free practice 3 took place on 28 August at 12:00 CEST. The final practice session ended with no major incidents, but saw many drivers sliding off the track. Bottas, Nikita Mazepin, George Russell, Sebastian Vettel, and Carlos Sainz Jr. all went off during FP3. Räikkönen finished his session early when his brakes failed—he managed to recover to the pits but didn't come back out. Gasly also spun. The Red Bulls took first and second, with Verstappen beating teammate Pérez, while Hamilton finished third.

== Qualifying ==
Qualifying took place on 28 August and was due to start at 15:00 CEST. Due to extreme rainfall, the start was delayed to 15:12. Everyone started on the full wet tyres, except for George Russell and Nicholas Latifi, who were first and second after the first qualifying laps. Everyone then fitted the intermediate tyres. The first session ended with Lando Norris in first, Max Verstappen in second, and Lewis Hamilton in third. Nikita Mazepin, Kimi Räikkönen, Mick Schumacher, Yuki Tsunoda, and Antonio Giovinazzi were eliminated from the remainder of qualifying.

All drivers completed the second session on intermediate tyres. Norris once again was first, with Hamilton second and Valtteri Bottas third. Lance Stroll, Fernando Alonso, Carlos Sainz Jr., Nicholas Latifi, and Charles Leclerc were eliminated from the remainder of qualifying. The third segment of qualifying started with worsening rain. Immediately, drivers were calling for a delayed session or red flag. Norris soon aquaplaned at Eau Rouge resulting in a heavy crash at Raidillon and a red flag. Sebastian Vettel stopped at the scene to check on Norris after complaining over the radio about the dangerous conditions. Verstappen took pole on his final lap, with George Russell in second, and Hamilton third. Russell secured Williams Racing's first front row start since the 2017 Italian Grand Prix, and equalled his career-best start, it remained his best start until he achieved pole at the 2022 Hungarian Grand Prix. Norris was cleared for Sunday's race after precautionary checks and an X-ray following his Q3 crash. After the Grand Prix, race director Michael Masi admitted it was a mistake to let the third segment of qualifying start on time.

=== Qualifying classification ===
Pos.	No.	Driver	Constructor	Qualifying times			Final grid
Pos.	No.	Driver	Constructor	Q1	Q2	Q3	Final grid
1	33	(Netherlands) Max Verstappen	Red Bull Racing-Honda	1:58.717	1:56.559	1:59.765	1
2	63	(United Kingdom) George Russell	Williams-Mercedes	1:59.864	1:56.950	2:00.086	2
3	44	(United Kingdom) Lewis Hamilton	Mercedes	1:59.218	1:56.229	2:00.099	3
4	3	(Australia) Daniel Ricciardo	McLaren-Mercedes	2:01.583	1:57.127	2:00.864	4
5	5	(Germany) Sebastian Vettel	Aston Martin-Mercedes	2:00.175	1:56.814	2:00.935	5
6	10	(France) Pierre Gasly	AlphaTauri-Honda	2:00.387	1:56.440	2:01.164	6
7	11	(Mexico) Sergio Pérez	Red Bull Racing-Honda	1:59.334	1:56.886	2:02.112	7
8	77	(Finland) Valtteri Bottas	Mercedes	1:59.870	1:56.295	2:02.502	13^{a}
9	31	(France) Esteban Ocon	Alpine-Renault	2:01.824	1:57.354	2:03.513	8
10	4	(United Kingdom) Lando Norris	McLaren-Mercedes	1:58.301	1:56.025	No time	15^{b}
11	16	(Monaco) Charles Leclerc	Ferrari	2:00.728	1:57.721	N/A	9
12	6	(Canada) Nicholas Latifi	Williams-Mercedes	2:00.966	1:58.056	N/A	10
13	55	(Spain) Carlos Sainz Jr.	Ferrari	2:01.184	1:58.137	N/A	11
14	14	(Spain) Fernando Alonso	Alpine-Renault	2:01.653	1:58.205	N/A	12
15	18	(Canada) Lance Stroll	Aston Martin-Mercedes	2:01.597	1:58.231	N/A	19^{a}
16	99	(Italy) Antonio Giovinazzi	Alfa Romeo Racing-Ferrari	2:02.306	N/A	N/A	14
17	22	(Japan) Yuki Tsunoda	AlphaTauri-Honda	2:02.413	N/A	N/A	16
18	47	(Germany) Mick Schumacher	Haas-Ferrari	2:03.973	N/A	N/A	17
19	7	(Finland) Kimi Räikkönen	Alfa Romeo Racing-Ferrari	2:04.452	N/A	N/A	PL^{c}
20	9	(Russian Automobile Federation) Nikita Mazepin (Note: Nikita Mazepin is Russian, but he competed as a neutral competitor using the designation RAF (Russian Automobile Federation), as the Court of Arbitration for Sport upheld a ban on Russia competing at World Championships. The ban was implemented by the World Anti-Doping Agency in response to the state-sponsored doping program of Russian athletes.)	Haas-Ferrari	2:04.939	N/A	N/A	18
107% time: 2:06.582

Notes

- ^a – Valtteri Bottas and Lance Stroll both received five-place grid penalties for causing collisions at the previous round.
- ^b – Lando Norris received a five-place grid penalty for an unscheduled gearbox change.
- ^c – Kimi Räikkönen was required to start the race from the pit lane for a rear wing change.

== Race ==
=== Race report ===
==== Start delays ====
The race was due to start at 15:00 CEST on 29 August but was delayed multiple times due to persistent rain. Sergio Pérez was initially not expected to start the race after he crashed on his way to the grid. However, despite the FIA race director Michael Masi initially suggesting to the contrary, Pérez was allowed by race officials to join the race after the Red Bull Racing mechanics were able to repair Pérez's car during the delay following the first red flag. A first attempt was made to start the race at 15:25 CEST, with two formation laps (that did not count towards a race classification) being completed behind the safety car before the starting procedure was suspended with cars queueing in the pit lane, in line with the regulations. At 17:00 CEST, the stewards used the powers given to them under article 11.9.3.o of the 2021 edition of the FIA International Sporting Code (which allowed the stewards to permanently or temporarily stop an event) to suspend the race clock on grounds of force majeure.

==== Race start and finish ====
After over three hours of delays and suspended starts, at 18:17 CEST the race officially commenced from the pit lane and two more laps were completed under the safety car, with these laps being considered as race laps by race control, which allowed for the results to be classified and half points to be awarded. During the third lap, the race was suspended again and was not resumed. The race result was taken after the first lap, in compliance with Formula One regulations which required a two-lap countback. Max Verstappen was declared the race winner (scoring his 16th career F1 win and sixth win of the season as a result) ahead of George Russell in second and Lewis Hamilton third. The remaining points scorers were Daniel Ricciardo in fourth, Sebastian Vettel in fifth, Pierre Gasly in sixth, Esteban Ocon in seventh, Charles Leclerc in eighth, Nicholas Latifi in ninth and Carlos Sainz Jr. in tenth. Verstappen's win was Red Bull Racing's fourth Belgian Grand Prix win and their first at the venue since Ricciardo's 2014 win as well as the first F1 win at Spa for a Honda powered car since the 1991 event. With only a single official lap completed, and an official completed distance of 6.880 km (4.275 mi), it is the shortest ever race in the history of the sport, eclipsing the previous records set in terms of kilometres of distance covered at the 1991 Australian Grand Prix (which was raced over 52.920 km (32.883 mi) and 14 laps) and in terms of official lap count at the 1971 German Grand Prix (which lasted 12 laps). For the sixth time in Formula One history and for the first time since the 2009 Malaysian Grand Prix, half points were awarded. Russell's second place was his first career podium and the first for the Williams Racing team since Lance Stroll finished third for the team at the 2017 Azerbaijan Grand Prix and the last until Carlos Sainz Jr finished third for the team at the 2025 Azerbaijan Grand Prix. Stroll finished this race 18th on the road but was classified in 20th, having been handed a 10-second time penalty for a rear wing change under parc fermé conditions during the first red flag period. This promoted Kimi Räikkönen to 18th and Pérez to 19th. Charles Leclerc was investigated for a change of tyres during the start delays but was not penalised as the change was quickly reversed. As of 2026, this race is the only World Championship Grand Prix where there is no officially recognised fastest lap. This was the eleventh Formula One World Championship Grand Prix where there were no retirements during the race, and the 12th World Championship Grand Prix to finish under the safety car.

=== Race classification ===
Pos.	No.	Driver	Constructor	Laps	Time/Retired	Grid	Points^{1}
1	33	(Netherlands) Max Verstappen	Red Bull Racing-Honda	1	3:27.071	1	12.5
2	63	(United Kingdom) George Russell	Williams-Mercedes	1	+1.995	2	9
3	44	(United Kingdom) Lewis Hamilton	Mercedes	1	+2.601	3	7.5
4	3	(Australia) Daniel Ricciardo	McLaren-Mercedes	1	+4.496	4	6
5	5	(Germany) Sebastian Vettel	Aston Martin-Mercedes	1	+7.479	5	5
6	10	(France) Pierre Gasly	AlphaTauri-Honda	1	+10.177	6	4
7	31	(France) Esteban Ocon	Alpine-Renault	1	+11.579	8	3
8	16	(Monaco) Charles Leclerc	Ferrari	1	+12.608	9	2
9	6	(Canada) Nicholas Latifi	Williams-Mercedes	1	+15.484	10	1
10	55	(Spain) Carlos Sainz Jr.	Ferrari	1	+16.166	11	0.5
11	14	(Spain) Fernando Alonso	Alpine-Renault	1	+20.590	12	
12	77	(Finland) Valtteri Bottas	Mercedes	1	+22.414	13	
13	99	(Italy) Antonio Giovinazzi	Alfa Romeo Racing-Ferrari	1	+24.163	14	
14	4	(United Kingdom) Lando Norris	McLaren-Mercedes	1	+27.109	15	
15	22	(Japan) Yuki Tsunoda	AlphaTauri-Honda	1	+28.329	16	
16	47	(Germany) Mick Schumacher	Haas-Ferrari	1	+29.507	17	
17	9	(Russian Automobile Federation) Nikita Mazepin	Haas-Ferrari	1	+31.993	18	
18	7	(Finland) Kimi Räikkönen	Alfa Romeo Racing-Ferrari	1	+36.054	PL	
19	11	(Mexico) Sergio Pérez	Red Bull Racing-Honda	1	+38.205	PL^{2}	
20	18	(Canada) Lance Stroll	Aston Martin-Mercedes	1	+44.108^{3}	19	
Fastest lap: None recognised

Notes

- ^1 – Half points were awarded, as less than 75% of the race distance was completed. (Note: Results have been calculated in accordance with Article 51.14 of the FIA Formula One Sporting Regulations, namely at the end of lap 1 being the penultimate lap before the lap during which the signal to suspend the race was given. However, for the determination of points, Article 6.5 is applicable, the leader having crossed the Control Line 3 times, therefore complying with the requirement for the leader to have completed more than 2 laps in order for half points to be awarded.)
- ^2 – Sergio Pérez's grid position was left vacant due to an accident that occurred when he was making his way to the grid. Once his mechanics repaired his car, he was allowed to start the race from the pit lane.
- ^3 – Lance Stroll finished 18th on track, but received a post-race 10-second time penalty for a rear wing change during the red flag period.

=== Post-race reactions ===
In addition to admitting to making mistakes on qualifying day, Masi also faced criticism from drivers, teams and media for how he ran the race. On race day, due to poor weather and after numerous delays, Masi made the decision to run two full laps behind the safety car before abandoning the race on the third lap, which Masi said was a genuine attempt to go racing. Media and drivers criticised Masi's decision to hold two laps under the safety car in still-raining conditions, with seven-time World Champion Hamilton calling the race "a farce" and criticised, among others, the alleged attempt to fulfill the requirements for awarding points. They argued that points should never have been awarded. Sebastian Vettel, Fernando Alonso, and Alfa Romeo Racing criticised the decision to award half points for the race. Daniel Ricciardo defended the decision to do so, as did Red Bull's Pérez. Ricciardo's McLaren teammate Lando Norris was left conflicted by the FIA's decision to award points since this benefited his fellow driver but thought it was not a race "deserving of points". Verstappen commented that it was not "the way you want to win". Russell was pleased to achieve his first Formula One podium despite the unusual circumstances, saying: "You don't get rewarded for this very often." He added that he had been rewarded for a strong qualifying on Saturday, whilst also sympathising with, and apologising to, the attending fans for the lack of action in the Grand Prix itself. Despite his driver winning the event, Red Bull team principal Christian Horner felt the decision to award points was not right. Mercedes team boss Toto Wolff called the decision to award half points "annoying".

Hamilton and Carlos Sainz Jr. called for spectators who bought tickets to be refunded. Hamilton stated his belief that Formula One had "made a bad choice" to complete two full laps behind the safety car before abandoning the race, alleging this was done purely to ensure Formula One fulfilled its commercial obligations. Formula One Group CEO Stefano Domenicali quickly rejected these claims. Haas F1 team principal Guenther Steiner suggested the criteria for awarding half points was possibly becoming outdated and needed updating. Pundit Scott Mitchell was also of the opinion that fans who attended the race deserve compensation, and that Formula One risked alienating some of its fanbase if it did not refund ticket holders in some way. In September 2021 Formula One and the race promoters then announced in a statement they would begin working on options for ticket holders following the race's suspension. However, despite this initial statement, in December 2021, it was announced that the race promoters would not refund ticketholders, and offer race attendees free passes for F1TV and the chance to be entered into a prize draw to win tickets to the 2022 Belgian Grand Prix. Two-time world champion Mika Häkkinen defended the decisions made by officials during the event. Scuderia AlphaTauri driver Pierre Gasly stated that Formula One needed to find a solution in order to reduce the amount of spray Grand Prix cars produce in wet conditions to improve driver visibility. Pirelli's head of motorsport Mario Isola said he felt the sport's decision to move to wider tyres from the 2017 season onwards was a contributing factor to drivers having more visibility problems in wet conditions, as they disperse more water compared to pre-2017 tyres. Vettel and Alonso dismissed the notion that the FIA was being overcautious with safety, citing the modern aerodynamics of the cars, downforce levels and wide Pirelli tyres that had made visibility worse when driving in wet weather – with races such as the 2007 Japanese Grand Prix (a race Vettel, Hamilton, Räikkönen, and Alonso all took part in) conducted over a full distance in arguably worse heavy rain conditions than those seen in at Spa. Adam Cooper of Autosport felt that the two lap requirement – a requirement which had been in use since between the 1977 and 1980 seasons and long pre-dated the official introduction of the safety car in Formula One was "a ticking time bomb that exploded" during race day events at Spa.

1992 world champion Nigel Mansell said that if he had been in charge of running the race, he would have relaxed parc fermé conditions for a wet race to allow teams to make needed set-up changes to make the cars driveable in tricky conditions. 1996 world champion and 22-time Grand Prix winner Damon Hill called the Grand Prix "a parade, not a race". Fellow former F1 drivers Pedro de la Rosa and Hans Joachim Stuck said that races would have started under such conditions in the past, with De la Rosa stating the sport had reduced its risk threshold compared to what was acceptable 10 or 15 years ago. Russell's performance in qualifying was praised and considered the high point of the weekend by pundits Edd Straw and Scott Mitchell. Journalist David Tremayne also praised Russell's performance, suggesting it was an indication that he was ready to step up to Mercedes seat for the 2022 season. F1TV's Lawrence Barretto and Will Buxton felt that while it was a difficult decision to abandon the race, the FIA had no choice but to shorten the race for safety reasons, and praised fans for their perseverance. Journalist Mark Hughes was critical of the decision to run two full laps behind the safety car, believing that doing so called into question the sport's "better values"; he suggested there was an undercurrent of cynicism from F1 bosses towards the fans, which he believed did not create a good image for the sport. However, fellow journalist Joe Saward in his blog stated that he felt the FIA handled the situation as best they could within the parameters of the regulations even if the scenario was not ideal, noting the fans suffered.

Journalist Josh Suttil considered the events at the race to be Formula One's biggest race-day debacle since the 2005 United States Grand Prix (where 14 cars withdrew at the end of the formation lap due to tyre safety concerns, leaving six cars in the race). Gary Anderson, Formula One pundit and former F1 technical director, and Martin Brundle, former F1 driver-turned-commentator, suggested that the race would have been better if cars had been running in virtual safety car conditions. Brundle also mentioned the idea of F1 possibly introducing 'slow zones', where a speed limit is imposed on part of the track. Anderson also proposed that the criteria for half-points should be extended going forward to require that at least 50% of the original scheduled race distance be run, without changing the current distance requirement for full points (75% of scheduled distance complete). He included the additional stipulation that at least 25% of the laps completed before race-end must be done under green flag conditions for a race to be considered eligible for points-scoring of any kind. In January 2022, Anderson wrote: "Spa was also a disgrace. How can half-points be awarded after three laps behind a safety car? The official result was based on just one lap of that!" Journalist Luke Smith also advocated changing rules whilst saying the podium celebrations of Verstappen and Russell in particular were "tone deaf", and contrasted them to Hamilton's restrained reaction. GPFans.com called it a "step backwards for F1" with their pundit Ian Parkes saying "F1 must take us for fools" in response to the claim that there had been a genuine attempt to go racing. Parkes was also critical of the general confusion surrounding rules on race day, such as whether Sergio Pérez could join the race after his pre-race crash, or when exactly the race itself and the race clock had been deemed to have started. F1 managing director Ross Brawn described the events at Spa as "a challenging day", whilst praising Russell's performance.

=== Clarification of race management ===
The Formula One regulations at the time of the race mandated that a minimum of two laps must be completed to award any points. Masi stated there was a genuine attempt to race under green-flag conditions before the rain got worse, and Hamilton said that "money talks". The Fédération Internationale de l'Automobile noted that it was "impractical" to delay the race until the following day. There was post-race confusion as to whether points would be awarded given that the classification showed one was completed, but the regulations stated that a minimum of two laps must be completed for a race to be eligible for points. Masi clarified that race was eligible for points as, "three laps were completed ... The third lap was completed when cars crossed the control line in the [pit lane] ... And then the classification for points is taken on the penultimate lap before the lap the signal was given [, the end of the first lap]."

=== Regulation changes ===
Formula One Management stated in the race aftermath that it intended to have discussions with the teams and the FIA regarding changes to sporting regulations to prevent such an occurrence from happening again. The proposed changes would attempt to formulate a more satisfactory minimum requirement for a classification to be achieved than was required under the 2021 rules, as well as discussing the possibility of written provisions in the rules enabling race organisers to reschedule a race if it were unsuitable to run the race on its original date. After one of the races of the 2021 Sochi Formula 3 round had its start time changed due to poor weather, Masi suggested that Formula One could adopt a similar rule to reduce the chances of having to abandon a race for bad weather. In January 2022, McLaren CEO Zak Brown cited the aborted Spa race, alongside the last minute cancellation of the 2020 Australian Grand Prix and the controversial restart at the subsequent 2021 Abu Dhabi Grand Prix, as signs that the FIA had suffered organisational and rule-making problems for a significant period of time which needed to urgently be resolved. Regulation changes for the 2027 season will abolish the three-hour clock which was used to determine the length of a race when including stoppages; it will be replaced with a hard stop for racing activity.

At a Formula One Commission meeting held in October 2021, changes concerning how points are awarded were discussed. The commission then recommended that the matter be discussed further at the next meeting of the FIA's Sporting Advisory Committee to set out proposals for regulatory and procedural changes regarding the awarding of points at shortened races. Any changes agreed upon by the Sporting Advisory Committee were required to then go to the FIA's World Motorsport Council for final ratification. In response to the race, Formula One started research into how to improve wet weather racing, looking at possibility of redesigning the cars to reduce spray whilst also preventing aquaplaning. In February 2022, the Formula One Commission approved rule changes, ahead of the start of the 2022 championship: the new points scoring criteria for shortened races was introduced. Although this was intended to be applied to all races which had not reached full distance, a clarification at the 2022 Japanese Grand Prix - where most of the paddock expected partial points to be awarded, but full points were given after 28 of 53 laps were completed - meant that changed rule only applied to races that were suspended and could not be restarted. The wording of this regulation was amended for 2023 to ensure that the number of points awarded was dictated purely by the percentage of full race distance covered irrespective of whether a race ends under red or green flag condition- thereby fulfilling the original intention behind introducing a gradual scale points system for shortened races.

Starting in the 2022 season, Formula One began exploring the possibility of introducing wet-weather specific wheel arches to improve visibility and with it the raceability of cars in wet conditions. They were timetabled to be introduced in midway through the 2023 season, or in time for the start of the 2024 season. Furthermore, in February 2023 Pirelli announced its intention to introduce a new, more raceable full wet tyre compound which they planned to have ready and available for use for the ultimately cancelled 2023 Emilia Romagna Grand Prix onwards and this tyre has subsequently entered service as of the 2023 Monaco Grand Prix. In 2023, George Russell stated that the wheel-arches were years away and reiterated that Pirelli full wet tyres remained largely unsuited to green flag racing even two years on from the Spa 2021 fiasco. Pirelli have responded to this continued criticism by proposing the introduction of a third wet weather (colloquially dubbed a "super-intermediate" tyre by RaceFans) possibly to serve as an in-between step between the existing Intermediate and Full Wet tyres in an attempt to give drivers an opportunity to go at racing speed in wetter conditions. Pirelli has also suggested that proposed tyre could also replace the existing Full Wet and Intermediate tyres with Mario Isola suggesting that Pirelli's newly proposed wet tyre showed improved performance and grip and able to work across a wider window of track wetness and grip compared to existing 2023 range of tyres following testing of these prototype tyres at Fiorano and Paul Ricard. Isola also stated his belief that moving to single wet tyre compound would be more cost effective. A spray guard design was tested by Oscar Piastri and Mick Schumacher following the 2023 British Grand Prix. However, this was deemed not successful with Ben Anderson and Scott Mitchell-Malm writing for The Race remarking the spray guard idea could be indefinitely delayed or abandoned. In May 2024 Ferrari tested a revised spray guard design on their at the Fiorano Circuit. This design was reported as being 'more aggressive' than the design trialled in 2023. Following this test the FIA decided to abandon the idea of spray guards altogether.

== Championship standings after the race ==
Drivers' Championship standings

	Pos.	Driver	Points
Unchanged	1	(United Kingdom) Lewis Hamilton	202.5
Unchanged	2	(Netherlands) Max Verstappen	199.5
Unchanged	3	(United Kingdom) Lando Norris	113
Unchanged	4	(Finland) Valtteri Bottas	108
Unchanged	5	(Mexico) Sergio Pérez	104

Constructors' Championship standings

	Pos.	Constructor	Points
Unchanged	1	(Germany) Mercedes	310.5
Unchanged	2	(Austria) Red Bull Racing-Honda	303.5
1	3	(United Kingdom) McLaren-Mercedes	169
1	4	(Italy) Ferrari	165.5
Unchanged	5	(France) Alpine-Renault	80

- Note: Only the top five positions are included for both sets of standings.

== See also ==
- 2021 Spa-Francorchamps FIA Formula 3 round
- 2021 W Series Spa-Francorchamps round

== Notes ==
Previous race: 2021 Hungarian Grand Prix	FIA Formula One World Championship; 2021 season	Next race: 2021 Dutch Grand Prix
Previous race: 2020 Belgian Grand Prix	Belgian Grand Prix	Next race: 2022 Belgian Grand Prix
