= 2022 Belgian Grand Prix =

Fourteenth round of the 2022 F1 season

Race 14 of 22 in the 2022 Formula One World Championship
| ← Previous race | Next race → |
- Layout of the Circuit de Spa-Francorchamps

Race details
- Date: 28 August 2022
- Official name: Formula 1 Rolex Belgian Grand Prix 2022
- Location: Circuit de Spa-Francorchamps; Stavelot, Belgium
- Course: Permanent racing facility
- Course length: 7.004 km (4.352 miles)
- Distance: 44 laps, 308.052 km (191.415 miles)
- Weather: Sunny
- Attendance: 360,000

Pole position
| Driver | (Spain) Carlos Sainz Jr. (Note: Max Verstappen set the fastest time in qualifying, but he was required to start the race from the back of the grid for exceeding his quota of power unit elements. He also received a five-place grid penalty for a new gearbox driveline. Carlos Sainz Jr. was promoted to pole position in his place.) | Ferrari |
- Time: 1:44.297

Fastest lap
| Driver | (Netherlands) Max Verstappen | Red Bull Racing-RBPT |
- Time: 1:49.354 on lap 32

Podium
| First | (Netherlands) Max Verstappen | Red Bull Racing-RBPT |
| Second | (Mexico) Sergio Pérez | Red Bull Racing-RBPT |
| Third | (Spain) Carlos Sainz Jr. | Ferrari |

The 2022 Belgian Grand Prix (officially known as the Formula 1 Rolex Belgian Grand Prix 2022) was a Formula One motor race held on 28 August 2022 at the Circuit de Spa-Francorchamps in Stavelot, Belgium. The race ran over a distance of 44 laps and was the 78th overall running of the Belgian Grand Prix, the 67th time the event has been held as part of the Formula One World Championship and the 55th World Championship race held at the Circuit de Spa-Francorchamps. The race was won by defending winner Max Verstappen. This was also the 350th Grand Prix entry for Alpine driver, Fernando Alonso.

== Background ==
The event was held across the weekend of the 26–28 August. It was the fourteenth round of the 2022 Formula One World Championship. The race marked the beginning of the second half of the 2022 championship following the summer break. A technical directive was introduced at this round to limit the amount of porpoising and bottoming out, following safety and legal concerns in the first half of the season. The FIA's proposal was for a specific addition to Article 3.15.8 of the technical regulations, addressing the flexibility of the plank underneath a car. The changes were initially proposed to come into force at the French Grand Prix in July, before being pushed back in order to give teams enough time to comply with the directive.

In the build up to the event, drivers including Lando Norris, Pierre Gasly and Sergio Pérez expressed sadness that the Circuit de Spa-Francorchamps could be omitted from the calendar for the 2023 championship and beyond, hoping the 2022 race would not be the last Formula One race at the venue. Reigning World Champion Max Verstappen described the circuit as his "favourite" and stated that it would be "a shame" to see the circuit dropped from the calendar in future seasons. Red Bull Racing team boss Christian Horner urged Formula One to "ringfence" classic venues such as Spa-Francorchamps, Silverstone and Monza to prevent them dropping off the calendar. Race organisers said renewing the contract for the race to be held in future seasons would "not be easy". In response to this, Formula One CEO Stefano Domenicali stated there was still a chance that the Circuit de Spa-Francorchamps could be included on the 2023 calendar. An agreement for the Belgian Grand Prix to be on the 2023 calendar would be reached.

The event featured five former Belgian Grand Prix winning drivers entering the event, these being four-time winner Lewis Hamilton (2010, 2015, 2017 and 2020), three-time winner Sebastian Vettel (2011, 2013 and 2018), and one-time winners Daniel Ricciardo (2014), Charles Leclerc (2019) and Max Verstappen (2021). Following concern over fan behaviour at previous races, particularly at the Austrian Grand Prix, the race organisers urged for "respect for everyone" and imposed restrictions on spectators to combat disruptive behaviour, banning attendees from bringing items such as glass, alcohol, weapons and smoke flares to the circuit. Despite contractual uncertainty surrounding his Formula One future at the time of the race, Alpine reserve driver Oscar Piastri continued to provide his team with in-weekend simulator support from the team's base at Enstone in the United Kingdom for this race.

=== Track changes ===
Since the 2021 Grand Prix took place the circuit subsequently underwent a major facility and safety redevelopment which had been planned since 2020. Extra run-off was added to the Eau Rouge/Radillion part of the course – changes made in response to several big accidents in recent years at that section of the track, including the fatal accident of Anthoine Hubert during the 2019 Spa-Francorchamps Formula 2 round. In addition gravel traps were added to six corners on the circuit: La Source, Radillion, Blanchimont, Les Combes, Stavelot and Pouhon. The track was also resurfaced with a more modern asphalt for this year's event, increasing track grip levels – meaning lap times at this year's event could be similar to those seen in dry conditions during the 2021 event with the new surface predicted to offset any performance losses caused by changes to the aerodynamic regulations, with Eau Rouge corner expected to remain flat-out. Max Verstappen was the first driver to run a Formula One car around the renovated circuit in a Red Bull RB7 in the build-up to the event.

=== Championship standings before the race ===
Max Verstappen led the Drivers' Championship by 80 points from Charles Leclerc, with Sergio Pérez third, a further 5 points behind. Red Bull Racing team led the Constructors' Championship, leading Ferrari by 97 points and Mercedes by 127 points.

=== Entrants ===
The drivers and teams were the same as the season entry list with no additional stand-in drivers for the race. Liam Lawson drove for AlphaTauri in place of Pierre Gasly during the first practice session, making his Formula One practice debut.

=== Tyre choices ===
Tyre supplier Pirelli brought the C2, C3, and C4 tyre compounds (designated hard, medium, and soft, respectively) for teams to use at the event.

== Practice ==
There were three practice sessions, each lasting an hour. Two practice sessions took place on Friday 26 August with the first having taken place at 14:00 local time (UTC+02:00) and the second at 17:00 the same day. The third and final practice session took place on 27 August at 13:00 local time. Carlos Sainz Jr. was fastest in the first session, Max Verstappen was fastest in the second, and Sergio Pérez was fastest in the third.

== Qualifying ==
Qualifying for the race was held on 27 August, starting at 16:25 CEST. The session was due to start at 16:00, but was delayed to allow for barrier repairs following a crash in the Porsche Supercup support race. Max Verstappen set the fastest time and Carlos Sainz Jr. inherited pole position as Verstappen was one of eight drivers (the others being Esteban Ocon, Lando Norris, Yuki Tsunoda, Charles Leclerc, Mick Schumacher, Zhou Guanyu and Valtteri Bottas) required to take penalties for exceeding engine component limits. One of the drivers taking power unit penalties, Yuki Tsunoda, was required to start the race from the pit lane having had power unit components changed outside parc fermé without the permission of the FIA's technical delegate.

=== Qualifying classification ===
| Pos. | No. | Driver | Constructor | Qualifying times | | | Final grid |
| Pos. | No. | Driver | Constructor | Q1 | Q2 | Q3 | Final grid |
|---|---|---|---|---|---|---|---|
| 1 | 1 | (Netherlands) Max Verstappen | Red Bull Racing-RBPT | 1:44.581 | 1:44.723 | 1:43.665 | 14^{a} |
| 2 | 55 | (Spain) Carlos Sainz Jr. | Ferrari | 1:45.050 | 1:45.418 | 1:44.297 | 1 |
| 3 | 11 | (Mexico) Sergio Pérez | Red Bull Racing-RBPT | 1:45.377 | 1:44.794 | 1:44.462 | 2 |
| 4 | 16 | (Monaco) Charles Leclerc | Ferrari | 1:45.572 | 1:44.551 | 1:44.553 | 15^{b} |
| 5 | 31 | (France) Esteban Ocon | Alpine-Renault | 1:46.039 | 1:45.475 | 1:45.180 | 16^{c} |
| 6 | 14 | (Spain) Fernando Alonso | Alpine-Renault | 1:46.075 | 1:45.552 | 1:45.368 | 3 |
| 7 | 44 | (United Kingdom) Lewis Hamilton | Mercedes | 1:45.736 | 1:45.420 | 1:45.503 | 4 |
| 8 | 63 | (United Kingdom) George Russell | Mercedes | 1:45.650 | 1:45.461 | 1:45.776 | 5 |
| 9 | 23 | (Thailand) Alexander Albon | Williams-Mercedes | 1:45.672 | 1:45.675 | 1:45.837 | 6 |
| 10 | 4 | (United Kingdom) Lando Norris | McLaren-Mercedes | 1:45.745 | 1:45.603 | 1:46.178 | 17^{d} |
| 11 | 3 | (Australia) Daniel Ricciardo | McLaren-Mercedes | 1:46.212 | 1:45.767 | N/A | 7 |
| 12 | 10 | (France) Pierre Gasly | AlphaTauri-RBPT | 1:46.183 | 1:45.827 | N/A | 8 |
| 13 | 24 | (China) Zhou Guanyu | Alfa Romeo-Ferrari | 1:46.178 | 1:46.085 | N/A | 18^{e} |
| 14 | 18 | (Canada) Lance Stroll | Aston Martin Aramco-Mercedes | 1:46.256 | 1:46.611 | N/A | 9 |
| 15 | 47 | (Germany) Mick Schumacher | Haas-Ferrari | 1:46.342 | 1:47.718 | N/A | 19^{f} |
| 16 | 5 | (Germany) Sebastian Vettel | Aston Martin Aramco-Mercedes | 1:46.344 | N/A | N/A | 10 |
| 17 | 6 | (Canada) Nicholas Latifi | Williams-Mercedes | 1:46.401 | N/A | N/A | 11 |
| 18 | 20 | (Denmark) Kevin Magnussen | Haas-Ferrari | 1:46.557 | N/A | N/A | 12 |
| 19 | 22 | (Japan) Yuki Tsunoda | AlphaTauri-RBPT | 1:46.692 | N/A | N/A | PL^{g} |
| 20 | 77 | (Finland) Valtteri Bottas | Alfa Romeo-Ferrari | 1:47.866 | N/A | N/A | 13^{h} |
107% time: 1:51.901

- ^a – Max Verstappen was required to start the race from the back of the grid for exceeding his quota of power unit elements. He also received a five-place grid penalty for a new gearbox driveline. The penalty made no difference as he was already due to start from the back of the grid.
- ^b – Charles Leclerc was required to start the race from the back of the grid for exceeding his quota of power unit elements. He also received a 10-place grid penalty for a new gearbox driveline and gearbox case. The penalty made no difference as he was already due to start from the back of the grid.
- ^c – Esteban Ocon was required to start the race from the back of the grid for exceeding his quota of power unit elements.
- ^d – Lando Norris was required to start the race from the back of the grid for exceeding his quota of power unit elements.
- ^e – Zhou Guanyu received a 10-place grid penalty for a new gearbox driveline and gearbox case. He was then required to start the race from the back of the grid for exceeding his quota of power unit elements.
- ^f – Mick Schumacher received a 10-place grid penalty for exceeding his quota of power unit elements. He also received a 10-place grid penalty for a new gearbox driveline and gearbox case. He was then required to start the race from the back of the grid for exceeding his quota of power unit elements.
- ^g – Yuki Tsunoda qualified 19th, but he was required to start the race from the back of the grid for exceeding his quota of power unit elements. The new power unit elements were changed while the car was under parc fermé without the permission of the technical delegate. He was then required to start the race from the pit lane.
- ^h – Valtteri Bottas received a 15-place grid penalty for exceeding his quota of power unit elements. He also received a five-place grid penalty for a new gearbox case.

== Race ==
The race was held on 28 August and started at 15:00 local time. At the start Sainz retained the lead while behind him Pérez was overtaken by Fernando Alonso and both Mercedes drivers. Pérez used the slipstream going up the Kemmel Straight to retake fourth position from Russell. Hamilton attempted to do the same to take second from Alonso and the two made contact as they were going through Les Combes, Alonso was able to continue his race with minimal damage. Hamilton continued until he lost water pressure a few corners later causing his first retirement of the season. Verstappen and Leclerc had managed to climb to eight and ninth respectively by the end of the first lap. On the second lap Nicholas Latifi ran wide coming out of Les Combes, collecting Bottas during his spin, with Bottas' beached Alfa Romeo bringing out the safety car.

During the safety car period Leclerc came into the pits in order to remove a visor tear-off from his right front brake duct. Once the race resumed Verstappen easily worked his way up the field, taking the lead by lap 12, relinquishing it only briefly after his first pit stop. Verstappen took the win, his ninth of the season, ahead of his teammate Pérez. Sainz finished third after being unable to match the pace of the Red Bulls. George Russell finished fourth for Mercedes. Leclerc finished fifth on the road before being demoted to sixth behind Alonso for speeding in the pit lane, after electing to make an additional stop on the penultimate lap in an attempt to take the fastest lap from Verstappen, which he failed to do. Ocon and Gasly overcame their grid penalties to finish seventh and ninth respectively, Norris was unable to do the same, finishing twelfth.

=== Race classification ===
| Pos. | No. | Driver | Constructor | Laps | Time/Retired | Grid | Points |
|---|---|---|---|---|---|---|---|
| 1 | 1 | (Netherlands) Max Verstappen | Red Bull Racing-RBPT | 44 | 1:25:52.894 | 14 | 26^{a} |
| 2 | 11 | (Mexico) Sergio Pérez | Red Bull Racing-RBPT | 44 | +17.841 | 2 | 18 |
| 3 | 55 | (Spain) Carlos Sainz Jr. | Ferrari | 44 | +26.886 | 1 | 15 |
| 4 | 63 | (United Kingdom) George Russell | Mercedes | 44 | +29.140 | 5 | 12 |
| 5 | 14 | (Spain) Fernando Alonso | Alpine-Renault | 44 | +1:13.256 | 3 | 10 |
| 6 | 16 | (Monaco) Charles Leclerc | Ferrari | 44 | +1:14.936^{b} | 15 | 8 |
| 7 | 31 | (France) Esteban Ocon | Alpine-Renault | 44 | +1:15.640 | 16 | 6 |
| 8 | 5 | (Germany) Sebastian Vettel | Aston Martin Aramco-Mercedes | 44 | +1:18.107 | 10 | 4 |
| 9 | 10 | (France) Pierre Gasly | AlphaTauri-RBPT | 44 | +1:32.181 | PL^{c} | 2 |
| 10 | 23 | (Thailand) Alexander Albon | Williams-Mercedes | 44 | +1:41.900 | 6 | 1 |
| 11 | 18 | (Canada) Lance Stroll | Aston Martin Aramco-Mercedes | 44 | +1:43.078 | 9 | |
| 12 | 4 | (United Kingdom) Lando Norris | McLaren-Mercedes | 44 | +1:44.739 | 17 | |
| 13 | 22 | (Japan) Yuki Tsunoda | AlphaTauri-RBPT | 44 | +1:45.217 | PL | |
| 14 | 24 | (China) Zhou Guanyu | Alfa Romeo-Ferrari | 44 | +1:46.252 | 18 | |
| 15 | 3 | (Australia) Daniel Ricciardo | McLaren-Mercedes | 44 | +1:47.163 | 7 | |
| 16 | 20 | (Denmark) Kevin Magnussen | Haas-Ferrari | 43 | +1 lap | 12 | |
| 17 | 47 | (Germany) Mick Schumacher | Haas-Ferrari | 43 | +1 lap | 19 | |
| 18 | 6 | (Canada) Nicholas Latifi | Williams-Mercedes | 43 | +1 lap | 11 | |
| Ret | 77 | (Finland) Valtteri Bottas | Alfa Romeo-Ferrari | 1 | Accident | 13 | |
| Ret | 44 | (United Kingdom) Lewis Hamilton | Mercedes | 0 | Collision damage | 4 | |
Fastest lap: (Netherlands) Max Verstappen (Red Bull Racing-RBPT) – 1:49.354 (lap 32)

Notes

- ^a – Includes one point for fastest lap.
- ^b – Charles Leclerc finished fifth, but he received a five-second time penalty for speeding in the pit lane.
- ^c – Pierre Gasly qualified eighth, but he started the race from the pit lane due to an electronics issue. His place on the grid was left vacant.

== Championship standings after the race ==
Drivers' Championship standings

| | Pos. | Driver | Points |
|---|---|---|---|
| | 1 | (Netherlands) Max Verstappen | 284 |
| 1 | 2 | (Mexico) Sergio Pérez | 191 |
| 1 | 3 | (Monaco) Charles Leclerc | 186 |
| 1 | 4 | (Spain) Carlos Sainz Jr. | 171 |
| 1 | 5 | (United Kingdom) George Russell | 170 |

Constructors' Championship standings

| Pos. | Constructor | Points |
|---|---|---|
| 1 | (Austria) Red Bull Racing-RBPT | 475 |
| 2 | (Italy) Ferrari | 357 |
| 3 | (Germany) Mercedes | 316 |
| 4 | (France) Alpine-Renault | 115 |
| 5 | (United Kingdom) McLaren-Mercedes | 95 |

- Note: Only the top five positions are included for both sets of standings.

== See also ==
- 2022 Spa-Francorchamps Formula 2 round
- 2022 Spa-Francorchamps Formula 3 round

== Notes ==
| Previous race: 2022 Hungarian Grand Prix | FIA Formula One World Championship; 2022 season | Next race: 2022 Dutch Grand Prix |
| Previous race: 2021 Belgian Grand Prix | Belgian Grand Prix | Next race: 2023 Belgian Grand Prix |
