= Green Flag (disambiguation) =

Green Flag is a motoring assistance company in the UK.

Green Flag may also refer to:

- Green (vexillology)
- Green flag (flags that are green)
- Green Flag Award, a mark of conservation effort in the UK
- "The Green Flag", an 1893 short story by Sir Arthur Conan Doyle
- The green flag of the Libyan Arab Jamahiriya from 1977 to 2011
