= 1946 Belgian Grand Prix =

Race details
- Date: 16 June 1946
- Official name: IX Grand Prix Automobile de Belgique
- Location: Bois de la Cambre; Brussels, Belgium
- Course: Street circuit
- Course length: 3.7 km (2.3 miles)
- Distance: 33 laps, 122.1 km (75.9 miles)

Fastest lap
- Driver: (France) Leslie Johnson
- Time: 1:58.6

Podium
- First: (France) Eugène Chaboud
- Second: (France) Pierre Levegh
- Third: (France) Raymond Sommer

The 1946 Belgian Grand Prix was a non-championship sportscar race held on 16 June 1946 in the public park of Bois de la Cambre in Brussels.

== Report ==
There were two supporting races. The 2000 cc (1000 cc s/c) race, officially called the Seaman Cup, was won by St John Horsfall driving an Aston Martin, with Leslie Johnson coming second in a Frazer Nash and earning the Winston Churchill Cup for the fastest lap. (Note: The Motor Sport Database erroneously attributes this lap, 1:58.6 at a speed of 69.72 mph (112.20 km/h), as the fastest lap of the main Grand Prix.) The 1100 cc race was won by Franco Bertani in a Stanguellini, ahead of Simca-Gordini co-founder Amédée Gordini in a car of his own construction, the latter having turned around whilst leading.

== Entries ==
No	Driver	Entrant	Constructor	Chassis
51	(United Kingdom) T.A.S.O. Mathieson	T.A.S.O. Mathieson	Talbot-Lago	
52	(Monaco) Louis Chiron	Lord Selsdon	Talbot-Lago	Talbot-Lago T26C
53	(Netherlands) Harry Herkuleyns	Harry Herkuleyns	MG	MG Magnette K3
54	(France) Jacques Seylair		Delage	
55	(France) Pierre Levegh	Pierre Levegh	Talbot-Lago	Talbot-Lago T150C
56	(France) Raymond Sommer	Raymond Sommer	Talbot-Lago	Talbot-Lago T26C
58	(France) Henri Trillaud	Ecurie Henri Trillaud	Delahaye	Delahaye 135CS
59	(United Kingdom) Leslie Johnson	Leslie Johnson	Talbot-Lago	Talbot-Lago T150C
60	(United Kingdom) Pat Garland	Pat Garland	Delage	Delage D6-70
62	"Borelli"		Alfa Romeo	
64	(France) Pierre Flahaut		Amilcar	
65	(France) Louis Villeneuve		Delahaye	
66	(France) Georges Grignard	Georges Grignard	Delahaye	Delahaye 135CS
67	(France) Charles Pozzi		Delahaye	
68	(France) Eugène Chaboud	Eugène Chaboud	Delahaye	Delahaye 135CS
69	(France) "Lascaud"		Amilcar	
70	(France) Joseph Chotard		Delahaye	

== Classification ==
Pos	No	Driver	Constructor	Laps	Time/retired
1	68	(France) Eugène Chaboud	Delahaye	33	1:07.45.2
2	55	(France) Pierre Levegh	Talbot-Lago	33	+4.0 sec
3	56	(France) Raymond Sommer	Talbot-Lago	33	
4	66	(France) Georges Grignard	Delahaye	32	+1 lap
5	58	(France) Henri Trillaud	Delahaye	31	+2 laps
6	60	(United Kingdom) Pat Garland	Delage		
7	53	(Netherlands) Harry Herkuleyns	MG		
Ret	52	(Monaco) Louis Chiron	Talbot-Lago		Fuel pump
Ret	59	(United Kingdom) Leslie Johnson	Talbot-Lago		Gearbox
DNS	51	(United Kingdom) T.A.S.O. Mathieson	Talbot-Lago		
Sources: (Note: Motor Sport reports that Seylair finished 7th, Lascaud 8th, Villeneuve 9th and Flahaut 10th. Racing Sportscars reports that these drivers never took up their entries to the event.)
