= 2013 Belgian Grand Prix =

Race 11 of 19 in the 2013 Formula One World Championship
← Previous race	Next race →
- Layout of the Spa-Francorchamps circuit

Race details
- Date: 25 August 2013
- Official name: 2013 Formula 1 Shell Belgian Grand Prix
- Location: Circuit de Spa-Francorchamps; Francorchamps, Wallonia, Belgium
- Course: Permanent racing facility
- Course length: 7.004 km (4.352 miles)
- Distance: 44 laps, 308.052 km (191.415 miles)
- Weather: Cloudy

Pole position
Driver	(United Kingdom) Lewis Hamilton	Mercedes
- Time: 2:01.012

Fastest lap
Driver	(Germany) Sebastian Vettel	Red Bull-Renault
- Time: 1:50.756 on lap 40

Podium
First	(Germany) Sebastian Vettel	Red Bull-Renault
Second	(Spain) Fernando Alonso	Ferrari
Third	(United Kingdom) Lewis Hamilton	Mercedes

The 2013 Belgian Grand Prix (formally known as the 2013 Formula 1 Shell Belgian Grand Prix) was a Formula One motor race on 25 August 2013 at the Circuit de Spa-Francorchamps, near the village of Francorchamps, Wallonia, Belgium. It was the eleventh round of the 2013 season, and the 69th running of the Belgian Grand Prix.

The race was won by Sebastian Vettel in a Red Bull-Renault in a time of 1:23:42, registering an average speed of 220.80 km/h, thus extending his championship lead to 46 points. Second was Fernando Alonso in a Ferrari, and third was Lewis Hamilton (who had started from pole) in a Mercedes. This was the first of 9 straight victories for Vettel, a Formula One record at the time.

== Report ==
=== Background ===
Like the 2012 Belgian Grand Prix, tyre supplier Pirelli brought its orange-banded hard compound tyre as the harder "prime" tyre and the white-banded medium compound tyre as the softer "option" tyre.

=== Qualifying ===
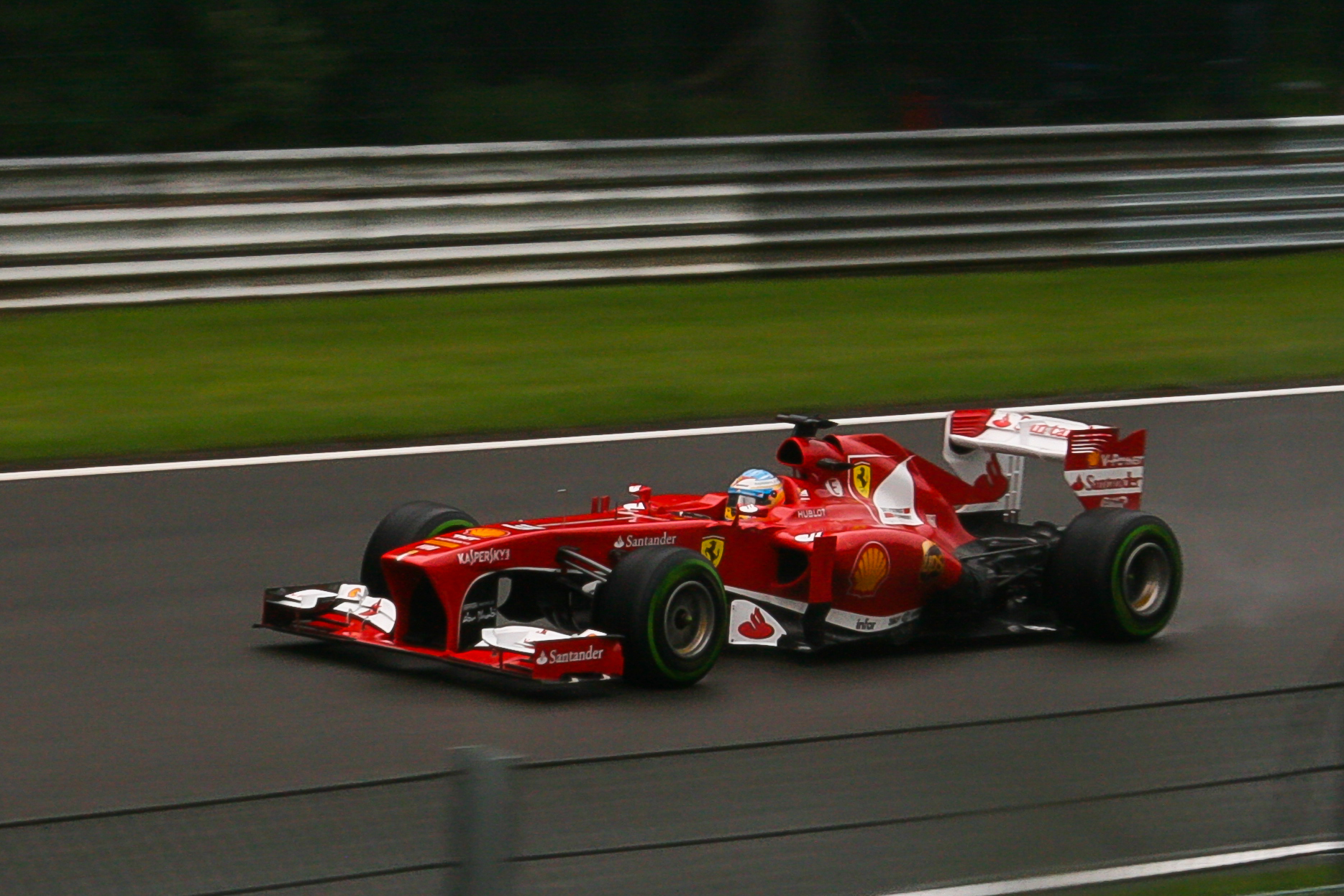
Fernando Alonso at Q1 using intermediate tyres.

Mercedes had taken 7 of the last 8 poles, but in practice, Red Bull had appeared to be the fastest team. A rain shower hit the track right before qualifying got underway, dropping the air temperature to only 22 °C and mixing things up even further.

All the drivers started the session with intermediates, Lewis Hamilton set the first benchmark of 2:07.008. As the track continued drying, Nico Rosberg, Mark Webber, and Sebastian Vettel all hit the front briefly. After the midpoint, most drivers pitted for a new set of intermediate tyres while Giedo van der Garde took a gamble to switch onto the slicks. As times passing by, lap times improved rapidly, nearly pushing both Ferraris out of Q2. But Fernando Alonso managed to set the fastest time at the last moment, and his team-mate Felipe Massa also made it into the next session. Van der Garde's decision proved a big success, for he impressively finished 3rd. In fact, three of the four drivers from Caterham and Marussia squeezed into Q2, the only one that failed to do so was Charles Pic, who started the race from the last place on the grid. Also eliminated were the Williams duo, the two Toro Rossos, and the Sauber of Esteban Gutiérrez.

At the beginning of the 15-minute period, drivers were divided into 2 groups, most of them used mediums, while several others, including Webber and Alonso, chose the hards. In the opening phase, Webber and Alonso were fighting for the top spot, their gap being merely two-thousandths of a second. At the same time, Vettel and Hamilton stayed in the pits until there were about 7 minutes left on the board. After that it was time for mediums, first the two Lotuses, then Sebastian Vettel, all challenging for the first place. But finally, Kimi Räikkönen put the fight to an end with a 1:48.296. Eliminated in Q2 were Sauber's Nico Hülkenberg, Force India's Adrian Sutil, McLaren's Sergio Pérez, Caterham's Giedo van der Garde who achieved the team's best qualifying result ever, and both the Marussias.

In fear of the incoming shower, all bar Paul di Resta queued at the pit exit with medium tyres. However, just moments later, the Force India driver opted to use the inters. It soon turned out that the latter was right, as the other 9 drivers didn't even start a flying lap as the track was too wet for slicks and they had to pit immediately. Di Resta then set the fastest lap time, with Felipe Massa in second. Just when it looked like he was going to take his maiden pole position, the track started to dry out. As there were 3 minutes left, Räikkönen gave the first shot to come to 3rd, ahead of Alonso. And Rosberg behind them posted a 2:02.251 to take the provisional pole. But none of them could cross the line before the chequered flag. With the ever-improving track, polesitter would be decided among three that still had one timed lap to go—Webber, Vettel, and Hamilton. Webber finished first to reduce the quickest time by almost a second. Then Vettel beat his teammate by a further one tenth of a second, Lewis Hamilton subsequently secured his fourth successive pole. The Lotuses and the Ferraris had to settle in rows 4 and 5.

=== Race ===
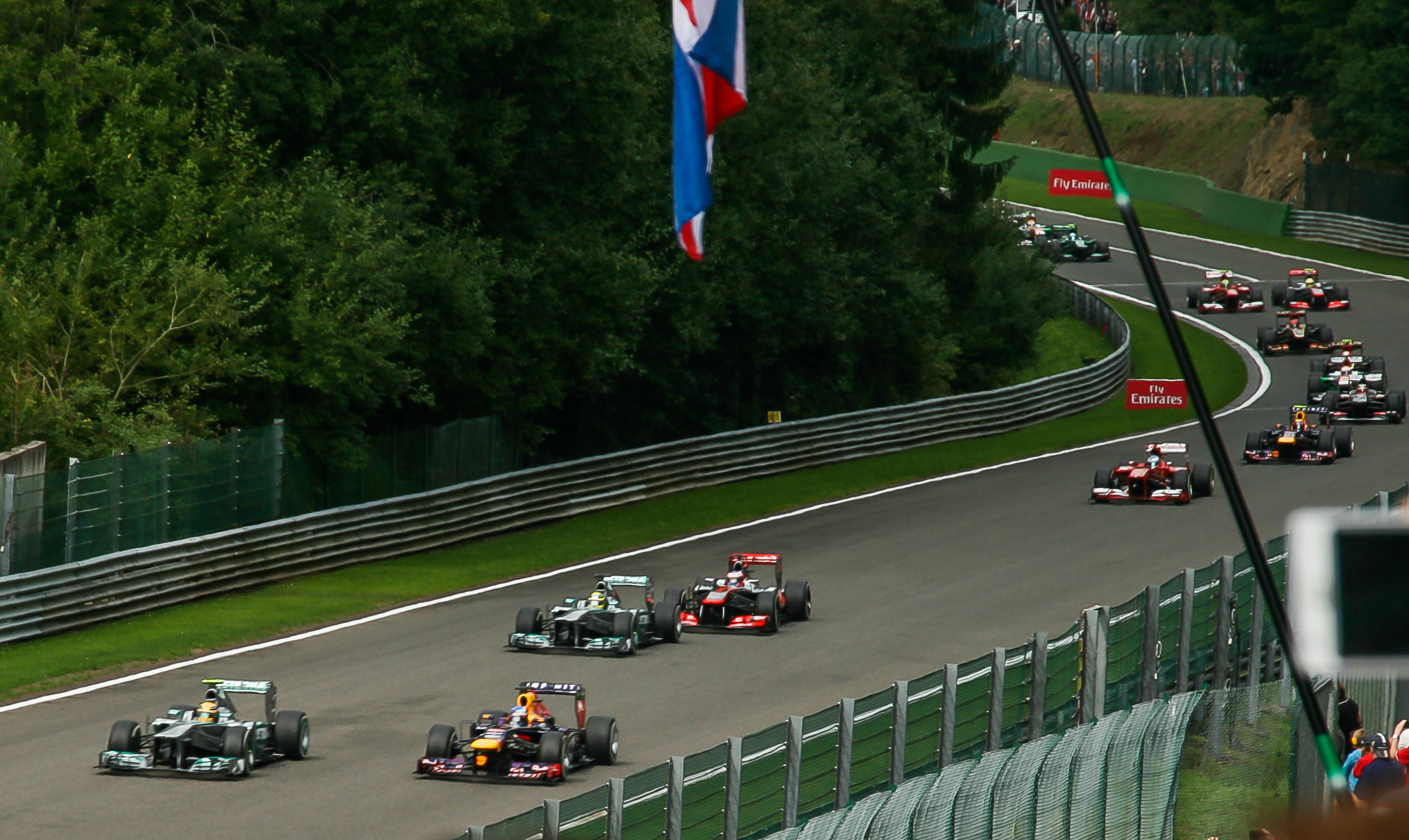
Sebastian Vettel overtakes Lewis Hamilton on the Kemmel straight during the first lap. He will stay in the lead until the end of the race.

Mark Webber suffered clutch problems right from the start and fell from third to sixth after one lap. On the other hand, Jenson Button and Fernando Alonso both enjoyed a great getaway, running in fourth and fifth places respectively. Sebastian Vettel had a great run up Eau Rouge and overtook pole-sitter Lewis Hamilton down Kemmel Straight on the first lap and quickly took a commanding lead over the Mercedes duo. Alonso and Webber both passed Button, and the Spaniard continued to fight his way up the field, overtaking Nico Rosberg for third place. Kimi Räikkönen was also working his way up the field, but excessive brake dust was coming out of Finn's left front wheel at an early stage in the race.

On the eighth lap, Sergio Pérez was handed a drive through penalty for forcing Romain Grosjean off the track. As a result, Grosjean had to straightline Les Combes and fell from eight to tenth as Felipe Massa took advantage. Räikkönen's brakes ultimately failed as the Finn went off massively at the Chicane, nearly collecting Massa in the process. The Lotus driver retired the car, which meant that his record run of consecutive points finishes ended at 27. It was later discovered that a loose visor tear-off got stuck inside the left front brake duct, causing the disc to overheat. After the first round of pit stops, Hamilton successfully retained second place from Alonso, but the latter quickly found his way through.

Further down the order, a battle involving Esteban Gutiérrez, Pastor Maldonado, and the Force India duo was raging. As the four cars were approaching the final chicane, the young Mexican successfully made his move on both Adrian Sutil and Maldonado. The German tried to follow but clipped the Williams driver's front wing. Maldonado dove for the pits only to collect the second Force India of Paul di Resta. As a result, the Venezuelan had to pit for a new front wing and received a ten seconds stop-and-go penalty while di Resta retired his car on the spot.

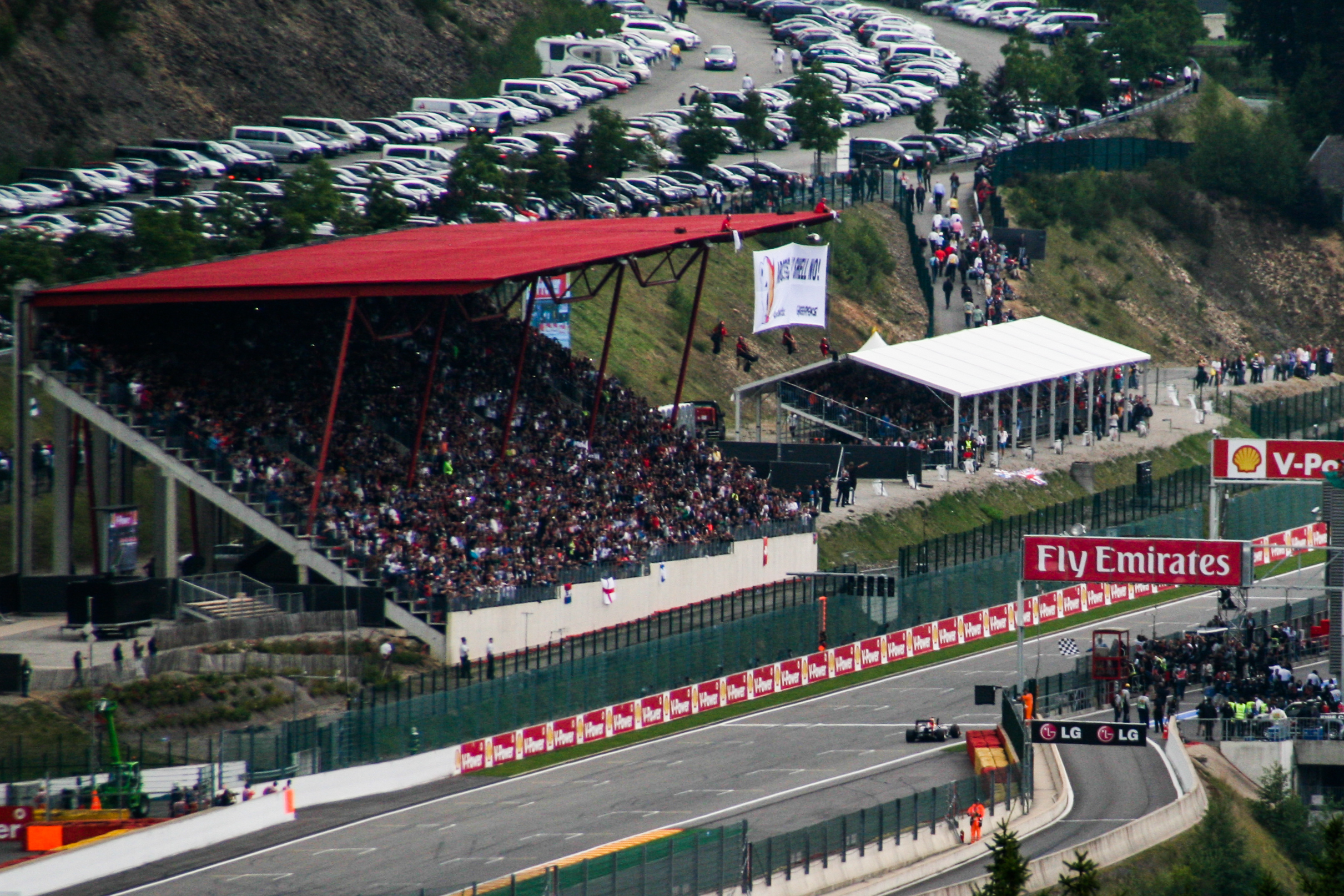
Sebastian Vettel takes the checkered flag, winning the Belgian Grand Prix.

Vettel won the race, ahead of Alonso and Hamilton. Nico Rosberg successfully fought off Webber for fourth, finishing less than three seconds behind his teammate. Button took sixth for McLaren, while the race-long scrap between Massa and Grosjean ended with the Brazilian in front for seventh. Sutil and Daniel Ricciardo took ninth and tenth respectively.

== Classification ==
=== Qualifying ===
Pos.	No.	Driver	Constructor	Q1	Q2	Q3	Grid
1	10	(United Kingdom) Lewis Hamilton	Mercedes	2:00.368	1:49.067	2:01.012	1
2	1	(Germany) Sebastian Vettel	Red Bull-Renault	2:01.863	1:48.646	2:01.200	2
3	2	(Australia) Mark Webber	Red Bull-Renault	2:01.597	1:48.641	2:01.325	3
4	9	(Germany) Nico Rosberg	Mercedes	2:01.099	1:48.552	2:02.251	4
5	14	(United Kingdom) Paul di Resta	Force India-Mercedes	2:02.338	1:48.925	2:02.332	5
6	5	(United Kingdom) Jenson Button	McLaren-Mercedes	2:01.301	1:48.641	2:03.075	6
7	8	(France) Romain Grosjean	Lotus-Renault	2:02.476	1:48.649	2:03.081	7
8	7	(Finland) Kimi Räikkönen	Lotus-Renault	2:01.151	1:48.296	2:03.390	8
9	3	(Spain) Fernando Alonso	Ferrari	2:00.190	1:48.309	2:03.482	9
10	4	(Brazil) Felipe Massa	Ferrari	2:01.462	1:49.020	2:04.059	10
11	11	(Germany) Nico Hülkenberg	Sauber-Ferrari	2:01.712	1:49.088		11
12	15	(Germany) Adrian Sutil	Force India-Mercedes	2:02.749	1:49.103		12
13	6	(Mexico) Sergio Pérez	McLaren-Mercedes	2:02.425	1:49.304		13
14	21	(Netherlands) Giedo van der Garde	Caterham-Renault	2:00.564	1:52.036		14
15	22	(France) Jules Bianchi	Marussia-Cosworth	2:02.110	1:52.563		15
16	23	(United Kingdom) Max Chilton	Marussia-Cosworth	2:02.948	1:52.762		16
17	16	(Venezuela) Pastor Maldonado	Williams-Renault	2:03.072			17
18	18	(France) Jean-Éric Vergne	Toro Rosso-Ferrari	2:03.300			18
19	19	(Australia) Daniel Ricciardo	Toro Rosso-Ferrari	2:03.317			19
20	17	(Finland) Valtteri Bottas	Williams-Renault	2:03.432			20
21	12	(Mexico) Esteban Gutiérrez	Sauber-Ferrari	2:04.324			21
22	20	(France) Charles Pic	Caterham-Renault	2:07.384			22
107% time: 2:08.603

=== Race ===
Pos.	No.	Driver	Constructor	Laps	Time/Retired	Grid	Points
1	1	(Germany) Sebastian Vettel	Red Bull-Renault	44	1:23:42.196	2	25
2	3	(Spain) Fernando Alonso	Ferrari	44	+16.869	9	18
3	10	(United Kingdom) Lewis Hamilton	Mercedes	44	+27.734	1	15
4	9	(Germany) Nico Rosberg	Mercedes	44	+29.872	4	12
5	2	(Australia) Mark Webber	Red Bull-Renault	44	+33.845	3	10
6	5	(United Kingdom) Jenson Button	McLaren-Mercedes	44	+40.794	6	8
7	4	(Brazil) Felipe Massa	Ferrari	44	+53.922	10	6
8	8	(France) Romain Grosjean	Lotus-Renault	44	+55.846	7	4
9	15	(Germany) Adrian Sutil	Force India-Mercedes	44	+1:09.547	12	2
10	19	(Australia) Daniel Ricciardo	Toro Rosso-Ferrari	44	+1:13.470	19	1
11	6	(Mexico) Sergio Pérez	McLaren-Mercedes	44	+1:21.936	13	
12	18	(France) Jean-Éric Vergne	Toro Rosso-Ferrari	44	+1:26.740	18	
13	11	(Germany) Nico Hülkenberg	Sauber-Ferrari	44	+1:28.258	11	
14	12	(Mexico) Esteban Gutiérrez	Sauber-Ferrari	44	+1:40.436	21	
15	17	(Finland) Valtteri Bottas	Williams-Renault	44	+1:47.456	20	
16	21	(Netherlands) Giedo van der Garde	Caterham-Renault	43	+1 Lap	14	
17	16	(Venezuela) Pastor Maldonado	Williams-Renault	43	+1 Lap	17	
18	22	(France) Jules Bianchi	Marussia-Cosworth	43	+1 Lap	15	
19	23	(United Kingdom) Max Chilton	Marussia-Cosworth	42	+2 Laps	16	
Ret	14	(United Kingdom) Paul di Resta	Force India–Mercedes	26	Collision	5	
Ret	7	(Finland) Kimi Räikkönen	Lotus-Renault	25	Brakes	8	
Ret	20	(France) Charles Pic	Caterham-Renault	8	Oil leak	22	

== Championship standings after the race ==
Drivers' Championship standings

	Pos.	Driver	Points
	1	(Germany) Sebastian Vettel	197
1	2	(Spain) Fernando Alonso	151
1	3	(United Kingdom) Lewis Hamilton	139
2	4	(Finland) Kimi Räikkönen	134
	5	(Australia) Mark Webber	115

Constructors' Championship standings

	Pos.	Constructor	Points
	1	(Austria) Red Bull-Renault	312
	2	(Germany) Mercedes	235
	3	(Italy) Ferrari	218
	4	(United Kingdom) Lotus-Renault	187
1	5	(United Kingdom) McLaren-Mercedes	65

- Note: Only the top five positions are included for both sets of standings.

== Greenpeace protest ==
Greenpeace used the Belgian Grand Prix as a main point of protests against Shell, a principal sponsor of the race. Greenpeace activists went to the track and put up a number of banners protesting against Shell drilling in the Arctic. These included two remote controlled banners which scrolled up in front of the podium celebrations, which were quickly disposed of by security, and a large banner on the main grandstand. The official world feed broadcast did not show any banner in detail.

== See also ==
- 2013 Spa-Francorchamps GP2 Series round
- 2013 Spa-Francorchamps GP3 Series round

Previous race: 2013 Hungarian Grand Prix	FIA Formula One World Championship; 2013 season	Next race: 2013 Italian Grand Prix
Previous race: 2012 Belgian Grand Prix	Belgian Grand Prix	Next race: 2014 Belgian Grand Prix
