= 2017 Belgian Grand Prix =

12th round of the 2017 Formula One season

Race 12 of 20 in the 2017 Formula One World Championship
← Previous race	Next race →
- Layout of the Spa-Francorchamps circuit

Race details
- Date: 27 August 2017
- Official name: 2017 Formula 1 Pirelli Belgian Grand Prix
- Location: Circuit de Spa-Francorchamps; Stavelot, Belgium
- Course: Permanent racing facility
- Course length: 7.004 km (4.352 miles)
- Distance: 44 laps, 308.052 km (191.415 miles)
- Weather: Partially cloudy and dry
- Attendance: 265,000

Pole position
Driver	(United Kingdom) Lewis Hamilton	Mercedes
- Time: 1:42.553

Fastest lap
Driver	(Germany) Sebastian Vettel	Ferrari
- Time: 1:46.577 on lap 41

Podium
First	(United Kingdom) Lewis Hamilton	Mercedes
Second	(Germany) Sebastian Vettel	Ferrari
Third	(Australia) Daniel Ricciardo	Red Bull Racing-TAG Heuer

The 2017 Belgian Grand Prix (formally known as the 2017 Formula 1 Pirelli Belgian Grand Prix) was a Formula One motor race that was held on 27 August 2017 at the Circuit de Spa-Francorchamps in Stavelot, Belgium. The race, contested over forty-four laps, was the twelfth round of the 2017 FIA Formula One World Championship, and marked the seventy-third running of the Belgian Grand Prix and the sixtieth time the race was held at Spa-Francorchamps.

Ferrari driver Sebastian Vettel entered the round with a fourteen-point lead over Lewis Hamilton in the World Drivers' Championship with Valtteri Bottas a further nineteen points behind in third. In the World Constructors' Championship, Mercedes led Ferrari by thirty-nine points before the race.

In his 200th Grand Prix, Hamilton started the race from pole position for the 68th time in his career, equaling the record of Michael Schumacher for most poles, and went on to win the race. In doing so, he closed to within seven points of Vettel's championship lead.

Television and motorsport personality Guy Martin was present as part of the Williams pit team as part of filming for an episode of his 'Speed' series.

== Qualifying ==
Pos.	Car no.	Driver	Constructor	Qualifying times			Final grid
Pos.	Car no.	Driver	Constructor	Q1	Q2	Q3	Final grid
1	44	(United Kingdom) Lewis Hamilton	Mercedes	1:44.184	1:42.927	1:42.553	1
2	5	(Germany) Sebastian Vettel	Ferrari	1:44.275	1:43.987	1:42.795	2
3	77	(Finland) Valtteri Bottas	Mercedes	1:44.773	1:43.249	1:43.094	3
4	7	(Finland) Kimi Räikkönen	Ferrari	1:44.729	1:43.700	1:43.270	4
5	33	(Netherlands) Max Verstappen	Red Bull Racing-TAG Heuer	1:44.535	1:43.940	1:43.380	5
6	3	(Australia) Daniel Ricciardo	Red Bull Racing-TAG Heuer	1:45.114	1:44.224	1:43.863	6
7	27	(Germany) Nico Hülkenberg	Renault	1:45.280	1:44.988	1:44.982	7
8	11	(Mexico) Sergio Pérez	Force India-Mercedes	1:45.591	1:44.894	1:45.244	8
9	31	(France) Esteban Ocon	Force India-Mercedes	1:45.277	1:45.006	1:45.369	9
10	30	(United Kingdom) Jolyon Palmer	Renault	1:45.447	1:44.685	No time	14^{1}
11	14	(Spain) Fernando Alonso	McLaren-Honda	1:45.668	1:45.090		10
12	8	(France) Romain Grosjean	Haas-Ferrari	1:45.728	1:45.133		11
13	20	(Denmark) Kevin Magnussen	Haas-Ferrari	1:45.535	1:45.400		12
14	55	(Spain) Carlos Sainz Jr.	Toro Rosso	1:45.374	1:45.439		13
15	2	(Belgium) Stoffel Vandoorne	McLaren-Honda	1:45.441	No time		20^{2}
16	19	(Brazil) Felipe Massa	Williams-Mercedes	1:45.823			16^{3}
17	26	(Russia) Daniil Kvyat	Toro Rosso	1:46.028			19^{4}
18	18	(Canada) Lance Stroll	Williams-Mercedes	1:46.915			15
19	9	(Sweden) Marcus Ericsson	Sauber-Ferrari	1:47.214			17^{1}
20	94	(Germany) Pascal Wehrlein	Sauber-Ferrari	1:47.679			18^{1}
107% time: 1:51.476

Notes

- ^1 – Jolyon Palmer, Marcus Ericsson and Pascal Wehrlein each received a five-place grid penalty for unscheduled gearbox changes.
- ^2 – Stoffel Vandoorne received a series of grid penalties totalling sixty-five places for exceeding his quota of power unit elements and an unscheduled gearbox change.
- ^3 – Felipe Massa received a five-place grid penalty for ignoring yellow flags in Free Practice 3. (Note: Although Felipe Massa was penalised, subsequent penalties issued to other drivers saw him restored to the position he originally qualified in.)
- ^4 – Daniil Kvyat received a twenty-place grid penalty for exceeding his quota of power unit elements.

== Race ==
At the start Lewis Hamilton held off Sebastian Vettel to lead although Vettel would continue to pressure him for most of the race. In the second half of the race, the safety car came out after the two Force India cars of Esteban Ocon and Sergio Pérez collided leaving debris on the track, earlier in the race both Pérez and Ocon had also touched wheels. Hamilton was not happy with the deployment of the safety car labelling it "BS", on the restart he came under attack again from Vettel but was able to fend him off up until the finish. Daniel Ricciardo came home in 3rd place, Valtteri Bottas' chances of the title were fading after only managing 5th.

=== Race classification ===
Pos.	No.	Driver	Constructor	Laps	Time/Retired	Grid	Points
1	44	(United Kingdom) Lewis Hamilton	Mercedes	44	1:24:42.820	1	25
2	5	(Germany) Sebastian Vettel	Ferrari	44	+2.358	2	18
3	3	(Australia) Daniel Ricciardo	Red Bull Racing-TAG Heuer	44	+10.791	6	15
4	7	(Finland) Kimi Räikkönen	Ferrari	44	+14.471	4	12
5	77	(Finland) Valtteri Bottas	Mercedes	44	+16.456	3	10
6	27	(Germany) Nico Hülkenberg	Renault	44	+28.087	7	8
7	8	(France) Romain Grosjean	Haas-Ferrari	44	+31.553	11	6
8	19	(Brazil) Felipe Massa	Williams-Mercedes	44	+36.649	16	4
9	31	(France) Esteban Ocon	Force India-Mercedes	44	+38.154	9	2
10	55	(Spain) Carlos Sainz Jr.	Toro Rosso	44	+39.447	13	1
11	18	(Canada) Lance Stroll	Williams-Mercedes	44	+48.999	15	
12	26	(Russia) Daniil Kvyat	Toro Rosso	44	+49.940	19	
13	30	(United Kingdom) Jolyon Palmer	Renault	44	+53.239	14	
14	2	(Belgium) Stoffel Vandoorne	McLaren-Honda	44	+57.078	20	
15	20	(Denmark) Kevin Magnussen	Haas-Ferrari	44	+1:07.262	12	
16	9	(Sweden) Marcus Ericsson	Sauber-Ferrari	44	+1:09.711	17	
17^{1}	11	(Mexico) Sergio Pérez	Force India-Mercedes	42	Collision damage	8	
Ret	14	(Spain) Fernando Alonso	McLaren-Honda	25	Power unit	10	
Ret	33	(Netherlands) Max Verstappen	Red Bull Racing-TAG Heuer	7	Power unit	5	
Ret	94	(Germany) Pascal Wehrlein	Sauber-Ferrari	2	Suspension	18	

Notes

- ^1 – Sergio Pérez retired from the race, but was classified as he had completed 90% of the race distance.

== Championship standings after the race ==
Drivers' Championship standings

Pos.	Driver	Points
1	(Germany) Sebastian Vettel	220
2	(United Kingdom) Lewis Hamilton	213
3	(Finland) Valtteri Bottas	179
4	(Australia) Daniel Ricciardo	132
5	(Finland) Kimi Räikkönen	128

Constructors' Championship standings

Pos.	Constructor	Points
1	(Germany) Mercedes	392
2	(Italy) Ferrari	348
3	(Austria) Red Bull Racing-TAG Heuer	199
4	Force India-Mercedes	103
5	(United Kingdom) Williams-Mercedes	45

- Note: Only the top five positions are included for both sets of standings.

== See also ==
- 2017 Spa-Francorchamps Formula 2 round
- 2017 Spa-Francorchamps GP3 Series round

== Notes ==
Previous race: 2017 Hungarian Grand Prix	FIA Formula One World Championship; 2017 season	Next race: 2017 Italian Grand Prix
Previous race: 2016 Belgian Grand Prix	Belgian Grand Prix	Next race: 2018 Belgian Grand Prix
