= 2018 Belgian Grand Prix =

Race 13 of 21 in the 2018 Formula One World Championship
| ← Previous race | Next race → |
- Layout of the Spa-Francorchamps circuit

Race details
- Date: 26 August 2018
- Official name: Formula 1 2018 Johnnie Walker Belgian Grand Prix
- Location: Circuit de Spa-Francorchamps; Stavelot, Belgium
- Course: Permanent racing facility
- Course length: 7.004 km (4.352 miles)
- Distance: 44 laps, 308.052 km (191.415 miles)
- Weather: Cloudy

Pole position
| Driver | (United Kingdom) Lewis Hamilton | Mercedes |
- Time: 1:58.179

Fastest lap
| Driver | (Finland) Valtteri Bottas | Mercedes |
- Time: 1:46.286 on lap 32

Podium
| First | (Germany) Sebastian Vettel | Ferrari |
| Second | (United Kingdom) Lewis Hamilton | Mercedes |
| Third | (Netherlands) Max Verstappen | Red Bull Racing-TAG Heuer |

The 2018 Belgian Grand Prix (formally the Formula 1 2018 Johnnie Walker Belgian Grand Prix) was a Formula One motor race held on 26 August 2018 at the Circuit de Spa-Francorchamps in Stavelot, Belgium. The race was the thirteenth round of the 2018 Formula One World Championship and marked the 74th running of the Belgian Grand Prix and the 61st time the race was held at Spa-Francorchamps and 51st time as a round of the World Championship.

The race was won by Scuderia Ferrari's Sebastian Vettel ahead of Mercedes' Lewis Hamilton and Red Bull Racing's Max Verstappen. The victory moved Vettel ahead of Alain Prost in all-time career Formula One victories and would be his last win for over a year until the 2019 Singapore Grand Prix.

== Report ==
=== Background ===
After going into administration during the Hungarian Grand Prix weekend, Force India arrived in Belgium under new ownership. A consortium led by Lawrence Stroll purchased the racing assets and operations of Force India through a company named Racing Point UK Ltd. The original team, Sahara Force India, was excluded from the Constructors' Championship due to their inability to participate in the remaining races, allowing the new team known as Racing Point Force India to apply for a late entry and start their participation in the championship in Belgium.

=== Championship standings before the race ===
Mercedes driver Lewis Hamilton entered the round with a 24-point lead over Sebastian Vettel in the Drivers' Championship. In the World Constructors' Championship, Mercedes led Ferrari by 10 points.

=== Practice ===
McLaren reserve driver Lando Norris made his first appearance at a Grand Prix weekend, replacing Fernando Alonso during the first practice session.

=== Race ===
The race was won by Scuderia Ferrari's Sebastian Vettel ahead of Mercedes' Lewis Hamilton and Red Bull Racing's Max Verstappen. With the win Vettel took his 52nd and overtook Alain Prost for third in the ranking of drivers with the most Formula One wins. The race featured a first lap crash involving Fernando Alonso, Nico Hülkenberg, and Charles Leclerc. Hülkenberg misjudged his braking before ramming into the back of Alonso, before flying over Leclerc's car and landing on the halo.

After the first corner incidents, Vettel passed Hamilton on the Kemmel straight on lap 1. Hamilton tried to repass at the end of the straight, as did the two Racing Point cars of Esteban Ocon and Sergio Pérez, and they were four abreast in the braking zone, with Vettel staying ahead. Hamilton was not able to challenge Vettel again.

== Classification ==
=== Qualifying ===
| Pos. | No. | Driver | Constructor | Qualifying times | | | Final grid |
| Pos. | No. | Driver | Constructor | Q1 | Q2 | Q3 | Final grid |
|---|---|---|---|---|---|---|---|
| 1 | 44 | (United Kingdom) Lewis Hamilton | Mercedes | 1:42.977 | 1:41.553 | 1:58.179 | 1 |
| 2 | 5 | (Germany) Sebastian Vettel | Ferrari | 1:43.035 | 1:41.501 | 1:58.905 | 2 |
| 3 | 31 | (France) Esteban Ocon | Racing Point Force India-Mercedes | 1:44.003 | 1:43.302 | 2:01.851 | 3 |
| 4 | 11 | (Mexico) Sergio Pérez | Racing Point Force India-Mercedes | 1:44.004 | 1:43.014 | 2:01.894 | 4 |
| 5 | 8 | (France) Romain Grosjean | Haas-Ferrari | 1:43.597 | 1:43.042 | 2:02.122 | 5 |
| 6 | 7 | (Finland) Kimi Räikkönen | Ferrari | 1:42.585 | 1:41.533 | 2:02.671 | 6 |
| 7 | 33 | (Netherlands) Max Verstappen | Red Bull Racing-TAG Heuer | 1:43.199 | 1:42.554 | 2:02.769 | 7 |
| 8 | 3 | (Australia) Daniel Ricciardo | Red Bull Racing-TAG Heuer | 1:43.604 | 1:43.126 | 2:02.939 | 8 |
| 9 | 20 | (Denmark) Kevin Magnussen | Haas-Ferrari | 1:43.834 | 1:43.320 | 2:04.933 | 9 |
| 10 | 77 | (Finland) Valtteri Bottas | Mercedes | 1:42.805 | 1:42.191 | No time | 17^{1} |
| 11 | 10 | (France) Pierre Gasly | Scuderia Toro Rosso-Honda | 1:44.221 | 1:43.844 | | 10 |
| 12 | 28 | (New Zealand) Brendon Hartley | Scuderia Toro Rosso-Honda | 1:44.153 | 1:43.865 | | 11 |
| 13 | 16 | (Monaco) Charles Leclerc | Sauber-Ferrari | 1:43.654 | 1:44.062 | | 12 |
| 14 | 9 | (Sweden) Marcus Ericsson | Sauber-Ferrari | 1:43.846 | 1:44.301 | | 13 |
| 15 | 27 | (Germany) Nico Hülkenberg | Renault | 1:44.145 | No time | | 18^{1} |
| 16 | 55 | (Spain) Carlos Sainz Jr. | Renault | 1:44.489 | | | 19^{1} |
| 17 | 14 | (Spain) Fernando Alonso | McLaren-Renault | 1:44.917 | | | 14 |
| 18 | 35 | (Russia) Sergey Sirotkin | Williams-Mercedes | 1:44.998 | | | 15 |
| 19 | 18 | (Canada) Lance Stroll | Williams-Mercedes | 1:45.134 | | | 16 |
| 20 | 2 | (Belgium) Stoffel Vandoorne | McLaren-Renault | 1:45.307 | | | 20^{1} |
107% time: 1:49.765

Notes

- ^1 – Valtteri Bottas, Nico Hülkenberg, Carlos Sainz Jr. and Stoffel Vandoorne all were sent to the back of the grid for exceeding their quota of power unit elements.

=== Race ===
| Pos. | No. | Driver | Constructor | Laps | Time/Retired | Grid | Points |
|---|---|---|---|---|---|---|---|
| 1 | 5 | (Germany) Sebastian Vettel | Ferrari | 44 | 1:23:34.476 | 2 | 25 |
| 2 | 44 | (United Kingdom) Lewis Hamilton | Mercedes | 44 | +11.061 | 1 | 18 |
| 3 | 33 | (Netherlands) Max Verstappen | Red Bull Racing-TAG Heuer | 44 | +31.372 | 7 | 15 |
| 4 | 77 | (Finland) Valtteri Bottas | Mercedes | 44 | +1:08.605^{1} | 17 | 12 |
| 5 | 11 | (Mexico) Sergio Pérez | Racing Point Force India-Mercedes | 44 | +1:11.023 | 4 | 10 |
| 6 | 31 | (France) Esteban Ocon | Racing Point Force India-Mercedes | 44 | +1:19.520 | 3 | 8 |
| 7 | 8 | (France) Romain Grosjean | Haas-Ferrari | 44 | +1:25.953 | 5 | 6 |
| 8 | 20 | (Denmark) Kevin Magnussen | Haas-Ferrari | 44 | +1:27.639 | 9 | 4 |
| 9 | 10 | (France) Pierre Gasly | Scuderia Toro Rosso-Honda | 44 | +1:45.892 | 10 | 2 |
| 10 | 9 | (Sweden) Marcus Ericsson | Sauber-Ferrari | 43 | +1 lap | 13 | 1 |
| 11 | 55 | (Spain) Carlos Sainz Jr. | Renault | 43 | +1 lap | 19 | |
| 12 | 35 | (Russia) Sergey Sirotkin | Williams-Mercedes | 43 | +1 lap | 15 | |
| 13 | 18 | (Canada) Lance Stroll | Williams-Mercedes | 43 | +1 lap | 16 | |
| 14 | 28 | (New Zealand) Brendon Hartley | Scuderia Toro Rosso-Honda | 43 | +1 lap | 11 | |
| 15 | 2 | (Belgium) Stoffel Vandoorne | McLaren-Renault | 43 | +1 lap | 20 | |
| Ret | 3 | (Australia) Daniel Ricciardo | Red Bull Racing-TAG Heuer | 31 | Collision damage | 8 | |
| Ret | 7 | (Finland) Kimi Räikkönen | Ferrari | 9 | Collision damage | 6 | |
| Ret | 16 | (Monaco) Charles Leclerc | Sauber-Ferrari | 0 | Collision | 12 | |
| Ret | 14 | (Spain) Fernando Alonso | McLaren-Renault | 0 | Collision | 14 | |
| Ret | 27 | (Germany) Nico Hülkenberg | Renault | 0 | Collision | 18 | |

Notes

- ^1 – Valtteri Bottas received a 5-second time penalty for causing a collision with Sergey Sirotkin.

== Championship standings after the race ==
Drivers' Championship standings

| | Pos. | Driver | Points |
|---|---|---|---|
| | 1 | (United Kingdom) Lewis Hamilton | 231 |
| | 2 | (Germany) Sebastian Vettel | 214 |
| | 3 | (Finland) Kimi Räikkönen | 146 |
| | 4 | (Finland) Valtteri Bottas | 144 |
| 1 | 5 | (Netherlands) Max Verstappen | 120 |

Constructors' Championship standings

| Pos. | Constructor | Points |
|---|---|---|
| 1 | (Germany) Mercedes | 375 |
| 2 | (Italy) Ferrari | 360 |
| 3 | (Austria) Red Bull Racing-TAG Heuer | 238 |
| 4 | (France) Renault | 82 |
| 5 | (United States) Haas-Ferrari | 76 |

- Note: Only the top five positions are included for both sets of standings.

== See also ==
- 2018 Spa-Francorchamps Formula 2 round
- 2018 Spa-Francorchamps GP3 Series round

== Notes ==
| Previous race: 2018 Hungarian Grand Prix | FIA Formula One World Championship; 2018 season | Next race: 2018 Italian Grand Prix |
| Previous race: 2017 Belgian Grand Prix | Belgian Grand Prix | Next race: 2019 Belgian Grand Prix |
