= Green flag =

Symbol with different meanings

A green flag has various meanings.

== National flags ==
- The flag of the Great Socialist People's Libyan Arab Jamahiriya was a plain green flag.
- The flag of Saudi Arabia has a field of green, which represents Islam.
- Irish nationalism was traditionally represented with a green flag. The current flag of Ireland is a tricolour with green representing the Irish Catholics, orange representing the Irish Protestants, and white in the middle to represent peace.
- The former flag of Mauritania.
- Various green-striped American flags flew during the Revolutionary War, with green representing the 'color of hope'.

== Other ==
- A green flag is part of a set of racing flags and indicates the beginning or resumption of an auto race.
- The actual flags flown in parks and gardens that have received the Green Flag Award.
- Green flags are widely used in the programming language Scratch.
- On rail transport in Great Britain and Ireland, green flags are sometimes used (less often than in the past) by railway guards as a signal to engine drivers that they can proceed.
- By analogy to the use of red flags as a warning symbol of negative traits, specifically in the context of dating and intimate relationships, a "green flag" is used to mean a sign of a positive trait in a person.

== See also ==
- White flag
