= Williams FW48 =

2026 Formula One car

- Williams FW48 driven by Alexander Albon at the 2026 Austrian Grand Prix
- Category: Formula One
- Constructor: Williams F1 Team
- Designers: Pat Fry (Chief Technical Officer); Matt Harman (Technical Director, Engineering); Angelos Tsiaparas (Chief Engineer); Steve Winstanley (Chief Engineer - Composites and Structures); Fabrice Moncade (Chief Engineer - Vehicle Dynamics & Computer Science); Jonathan Carter (Deputy Chief Designer); Richard Frith (Head of Performance Systems); Adam Kenyon (Head of Aerodynamics); Juan Molina (Chief Aerodynamicist)
- Predecessor: Williams FW47
- Successor: Williams FW50

Technical specifications
- Chassis: Carbon-fibre monocoque, laminated from carbon epoxy and honeycomb
- Suspension (front): Double wishbone, pull-rod activated springs and anti-roll bar
- Suspension (rear): Multi-link, push-rod activated springs and anti-roll bar
- Engine: Mercedes-AMG M17
- Electric motor: Kinetic and thermal energy recovery systems
- Transmission: Mercedes-AMG 8 forward + 1 reverse gear seamless sequential semi-automatic shift plus reverse gear, gear selection electro-hydraulically actuated
- Battery: Lithium-ion battery
- Weight: 772.4 kg (including driver, excluding fuel)
- Fuel: Gulf
- Lubricants: Gulf
- Tyres: Pirelli P Zero (dry); Pirelli Cinturato (wet)

Competition history
- Notable entrants: Atlassian Williams F1 Team
- Notable drivers: 23. (Thailand) Alexander Albon; 55. (Spain) Carlos Sainz Jr.
- Debut: 2026 Australian Grand Prix
- Last event: 2026 São Paulo Grand Prix
Races	Wins	Podiums	Poles	F/Laps
20	0	0	0	0

The Williams FW48 is a Formula One racing car designed and built by Atlassian Williams F1 Team to compete in the 2026 Formula One World Championship. The car is currently being driven by Alexander Albon and Carlos Sainz Jr., both in their fifth and second seasons with the team respectively.

A B-Spec version of the FW48 debuted at the 2026 Azerbaijan Grand Prix. Team Principal James Vowles confirmed that the B-Spec version of the FW48 will be carried over into the 2027 season.

On 15 October 2026 it was revealed that the 2027 car will be named the FW50 celebrating Williams 50th Anniversary.

== Background ==
=== Development ===
Williams prioritised the development of the FW48 before any other team, with development of the FW47 cut early, allowing for full focus on the FW48 from 1 January 2025. However, the FW48's development has been marked by production delays that saw the team miss the private shakedown test in Barcelona in late January 2026. However, the car was still through simulator prep, recording 500 laps with the Mercedes power unit. Rumours circulated that this was because the car was overweight, however, this was not the case as Williams published the technical specifications showing the cars weight to be 772.4kg, just 0.4kg heavier than the W17. The car made its track debut during a shakedown at Silverstone on 4 February 2026, using a special one-off livery voted by fans. The car made its official on-track debut at the first public pre-season test in Bahrain on 11 February 2026.

=== Sponsorship and livery ===
The livery was unveiled on 3 February 2026, at Grove. The livery was similar to its predecessor, FW47. However it differs, featuring a gloss blue base. It incorporates a heritage-inspired red and white keyline, a tribute to the championship-winning FW14B and FW18, alongside prominent light blue and white sections on the sidepods and wings to accommodate new partners, including Barclays. At Williams' home race, the team sported stripes of the Union Jack on the suspension side of the car.

For the first Spanish Grand Prix held at the new Madring circuit, Williams sported their 1981 livery, the year this team last time visited the Spanish capital. At the São Paulo Grand Prix, the team honoured Alan Jones, who died during the week of the Grand Prix, with a logo on the nose of the car.

Williams have showcased cars that featured liveries based on Dandadan and Avengers: Doomsday (2026). The latter was featured through special race suits and helmet designs at the 2026 United States Grand Prix.

== Complete Formula One results ==
Key

Key
Colour	Result
Gold	Winner
Silver	Second place
Bronze	Third place
Green	Other points position
Blue	Other classified position
Blue	Not classified, finished (NC)
Purple	Not classified, retired (Ret)
Red	Did not qualify (DNQ)
Black	Disqualified (DSQ)
White	Did not start (DNS)
White	Race cancelled (C)
Blank	Did not practice (DNP)
Blank	Excluded (EX)
Blank	Did not arrive (DNA)
Blank	Withdrawn (WD)
Blank	Did not enter (empty cell)
Annotation	Meaning
P	Pole position
F	Fastest lap
Superscript number	Points-scoring position in sprint

Year	Entrant	Power unit	Tyres	Driver name	Grands Prix																							Points	WCC pos.
Year	Entrant	Power unit	Tyres	Driver name	AUS	CHN	JPN	MIA	CAN	MON	BCN	AUT	GBR	BEL	HUN	NED	ITA	ESP	AZE	BHR	SIN	USA	MXC	SAP	LVG	QAT	ABU	Points	WCC pos.
2026	Williams F1 Team	Mercedes 1.6 V6 t	P	(Thailand) Alexander Albon	12	DNS	20	10	Ret	8	NC	17	Ret	15	17	17†	17	15	Ret	Ret	18†	17	11	15				12*	9th*
2026	Williams F1 Team	Mercedes 1.6 V6 t	P	(Spain) Carlos Sainz Jr.	15	9	15	9	9	16†	12	Ret	17	16	18	16	13	Ret	10	17	14	18	12	19				12*	9th*

* Season still in progress.
