= Carlos Sainz Jr. =

Spanish racing driver (born 1994)

- Sainz in 2026
- Born: Carlos Sainz Vázquez de Castro; 1 September 1994 (age 32); Madrid, Spain
- Parent: Carlos Sainz Sr. (father)
- Relatives: Antonio Sainz (uncle)

Formula One World Championship career
- Nationality: (Spain) Spanish
- 2026 team: Atlassian Williams-Mercedes
- Car number: 55
- Entries: 253 (249 starts)
- Championships: 0
- Wins: 4
- Podiums: 29
- Career points: 1343.5
- Pole positions: 6
- Fastest laps: 4
- First entry: 2015 Australian Grand Prix
- First win: 2022 British Grand Prix
- Last win: 2024 Mexico City Grand Prix
- Last entry: 2026 São Paulo Grand Prix
- 2025 position: 9th (64 pts)

Previous series
- 2013–2014; 2013; 2012; 2012; 2011; 2010–2011; 2010; 2010: Formula Renault 3.5; GP3 Series; FIA F3 European; British F3; Formula Renault NEC; Formula Renault Eurocup; Formula BMW Europe; Formula BMW Pacific

Championship titles
- 2014; 2011: Formula Renault 3.5; Formula Renault NEC
- Website: www.carlossainz.es/en/

Signature
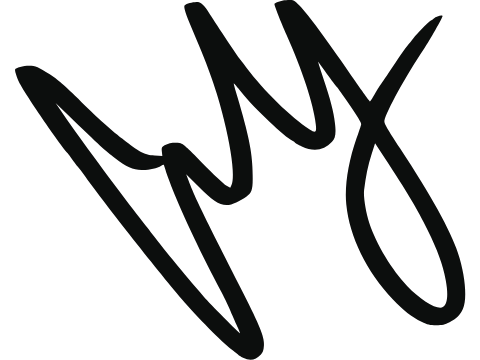

Carlos Sainz Vázquez de Castro (Spanish: [ˈkaɾlos ˈsai̯nθ ˈβaθkeθ ðe ˈkastɾo]; born 1 September 1994), commonly known as Carlos Sainz Jr., is a Spanish racing driver who competes in Formula One for Williams. Sainz has won four Formula One Grands Prix across 12 seasons.

Born in Madrid, Sainz is the son of two-time World Rally Champion Carlos Sainz. Graduating from karting to junior formulae in 2010, Sainz won his first championship at the Formula Renault NEC in 2011 with Koiranen, finishing runner-up to Robin Frijns in the Eurocup that year. In 2012, Sainz contested British Formula 3, the Formula 3 Euro Series and FIA European Formula 3 with Carlin. Sainz progressed to the GP3 Series with Arden in 2013, finishing tenth in his rookie season. He then found success in the Formula Renault 3.5 Series, winning the championship in 2014 with DAMS.

A member of the Red Bull Junior Team since 2010, Sainz signed with Toro Rosso in 2015, debuting alongside Max Verstappen. He remained at Toro Rosso until the 2017 United States Grand Prix, where he replaced Jolyon Palmer at Renault, having already signed with the team from 2018 onwards. Sainz moved to McLaren in 2019, ending his association with Red Bull. He took his maiden podium at the Brazilian Grand Prix that year, followed by another at the Italian Grand Prix in 2020. Sainz signed for Ferrari in 2021, replacing Sebastian Vettel to partner Charles Leclerc. After a winless debut season for Ferrari, Sainz took his maiden pole position and win at the British Grand Prix in 2022. He took further wins for Ferrari at Singapore in 2023, as well as Australia and Mexico City in 2024. Replaced by Lewis Hamilton for 2025, Sainz joined Williams to partner Alexander Albon, claiming two podiums at the Azerbaijan Grand Prix and the Qatar Grand Prix.

As of the 2026 São Paulo Grand Prix, Sainz has achieved four race wins, six pole positions, four fastest laps and 29 podiums in Formula One. Sainz is contracted to remain at Williams until at least the end of the 2027 season.

== Early life ==
Carlos Sainz Vázquez de Castro was born on 1 September 1994 in Madrid, Spain, to mother Reyes Vázquez de Castro and father Carlos Sainz. His father is a rally driver, who won the World Rally Championship twice in 1990 and 1992, with 26 rally victories. Sainz Jr. was mentored by his father throughout his journey to F1.

In 2016, Sainz was named Ambassador of María de Villota's Legacy, as he was coached by her at driving school in Madrid. He has spoken about how he was personally affected by her death in 2013, and he has kept a star on his helmet since 2014 in honor of her.

== Junior racing career ==
=== Karting ===
Sainz started his career in karting in 2006, after participating in smaller series, in 2008, he won the Asia-Pacific KF3 title, as well as finishing runner-up in the Spanish Championship. In 2009, he also won the Junior Monaco Kart Cup, and was runner-up in the European KF3 Championship. While at driving school in Madrid, he was coached by María de Villota.

=== Formula BMW ===
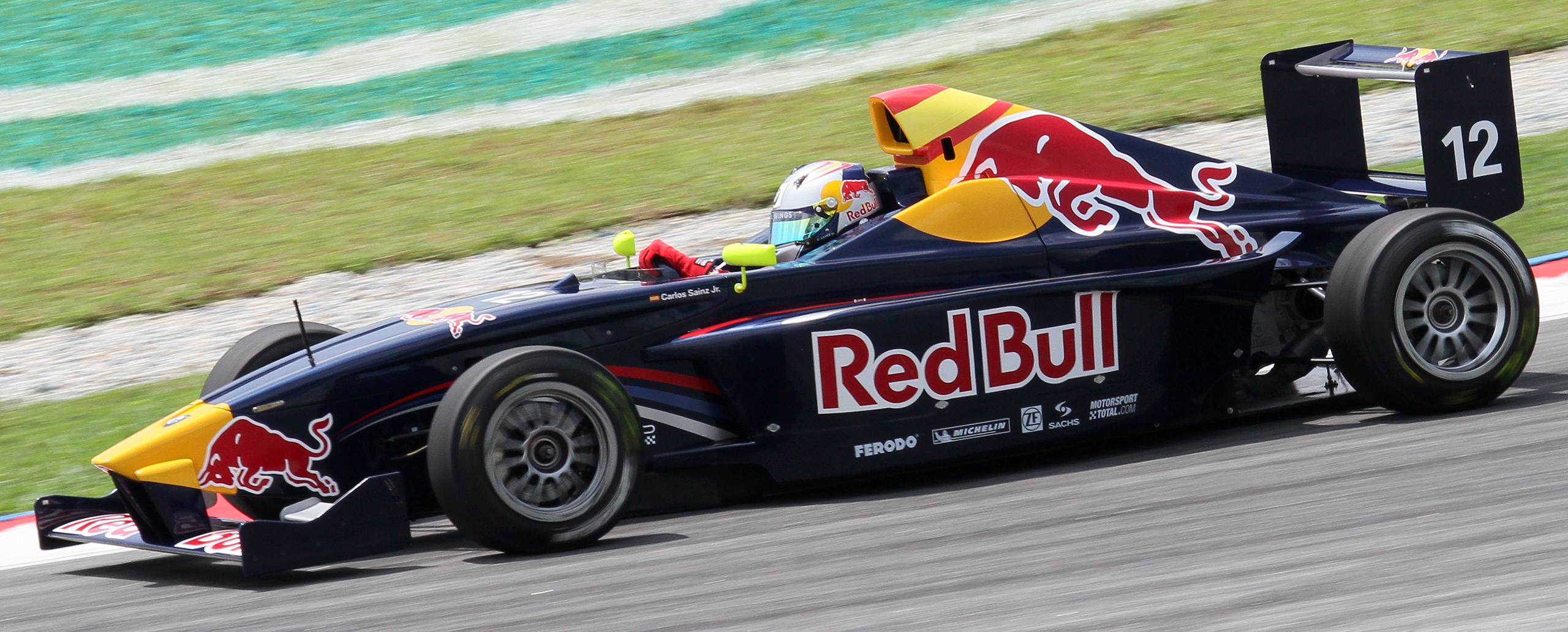
Sainz during Race 1 of the 2010 Formula BMW Pacific season at Sepang International Circuit

Sainz raced in Formula BMW Europe in 2010 with the EuroInternational team. He was also part of the Red Bull Junior Team programme. He made his Formula BMW debut during a guest drive in the Formula BMW Pacific series at Sepang, Malaysia where he was ineligible to score points as a guest driver. However, he placed second in the opening race in Malaysia. That debut was followed by a fourth place. The following race day, he retired from the first race but won the second race. He finished seventh in the following race. He missed the next race in China but returned to Singapore. He finished sixth in the first race and second in the second race. He missed the Japanese races but returned to win the season finale in Macau. Overall, in nine races he achieved three pole positions, two wins, and two fastest laps.

In Formula BMW Europe, Sainz started his career with a podium position of third and sixth place at the Circuit de Catalunya. At Zandvoort, he took fifth and second place. At Valencia, he scored seventh and tenth place. A weekend at Silverstone saw him take third place and a victory in the following race, his first that season. Hockenheim saw him take 11th and sixth place. A fourth and a podium position of third. Robin Frijns was on a charge, scoring a podium position in every race but three, two of which he finished in fourth. A double retirement at Spa put him out of championship contention. An eighth and sixth at the season finale at Monza followed. He finished the season fourth with 227 points.

Sainz also competed in the UK Formula Renault Winter Cup, finishing sixth in the first race and retiring from the second race at Snetterton.

=== Formula Three ===
During the 2012 season, Sainz raced in both British and Euro Series Formula 3 championships. Racing for Carlin, he won four races, finished nine times on the podium, as well as scoring a pole position in the British championship, finishing sixth overall in the final championship standings. He scored two podiums and two pole positions in the Euro Series championship, finishing in ninth position overall.

=== GP3 Series ===
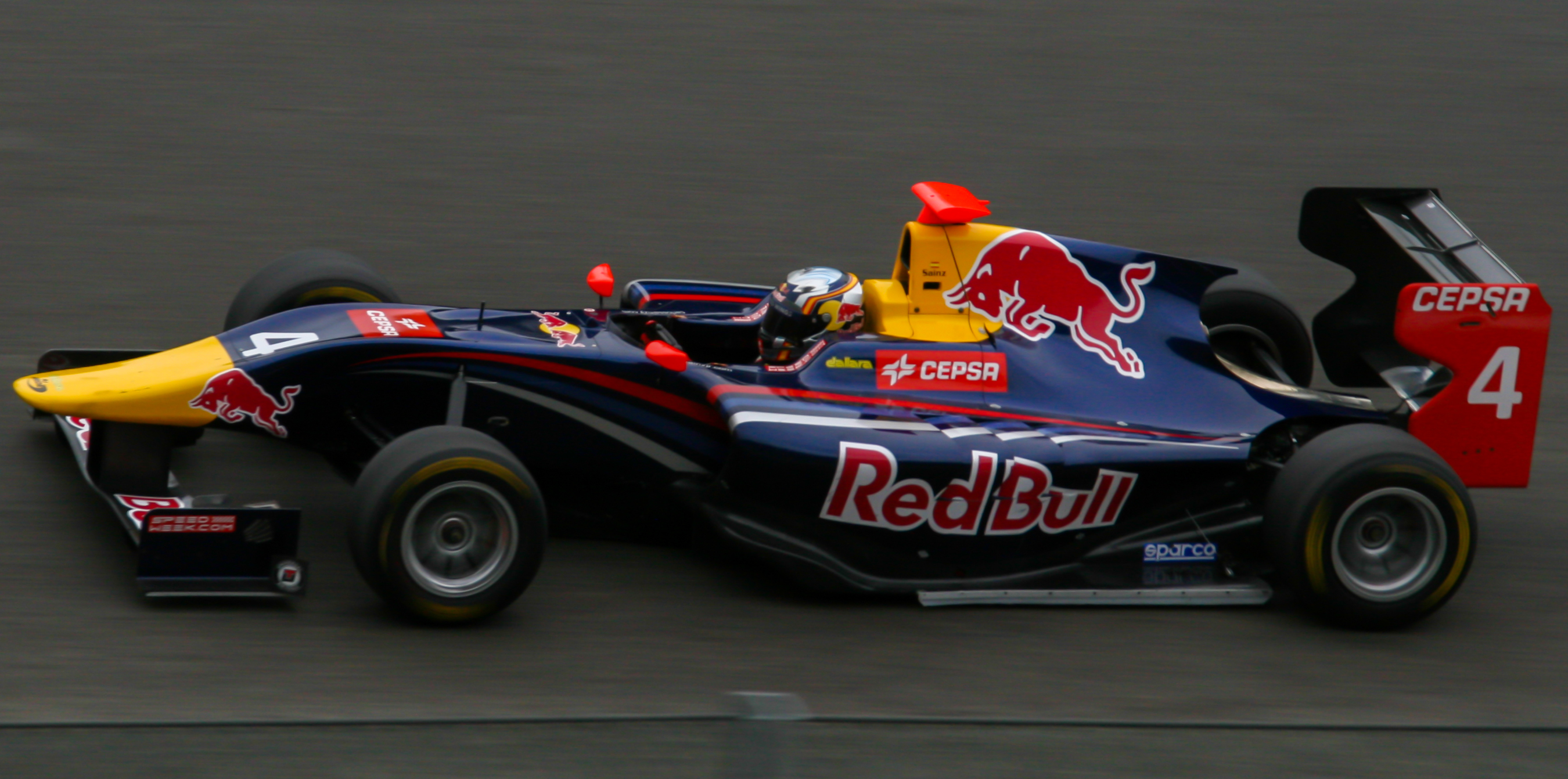
Sainz competing for MW Arden during the 2013 GP3 Series, at Spa-Francorchamps

In 2013, Sainz completed for MW Arden in the GP3 series. He finished tenth in the championship with 66 points and achieved two podium finishes.

=== Formula Renault 3.5 ===
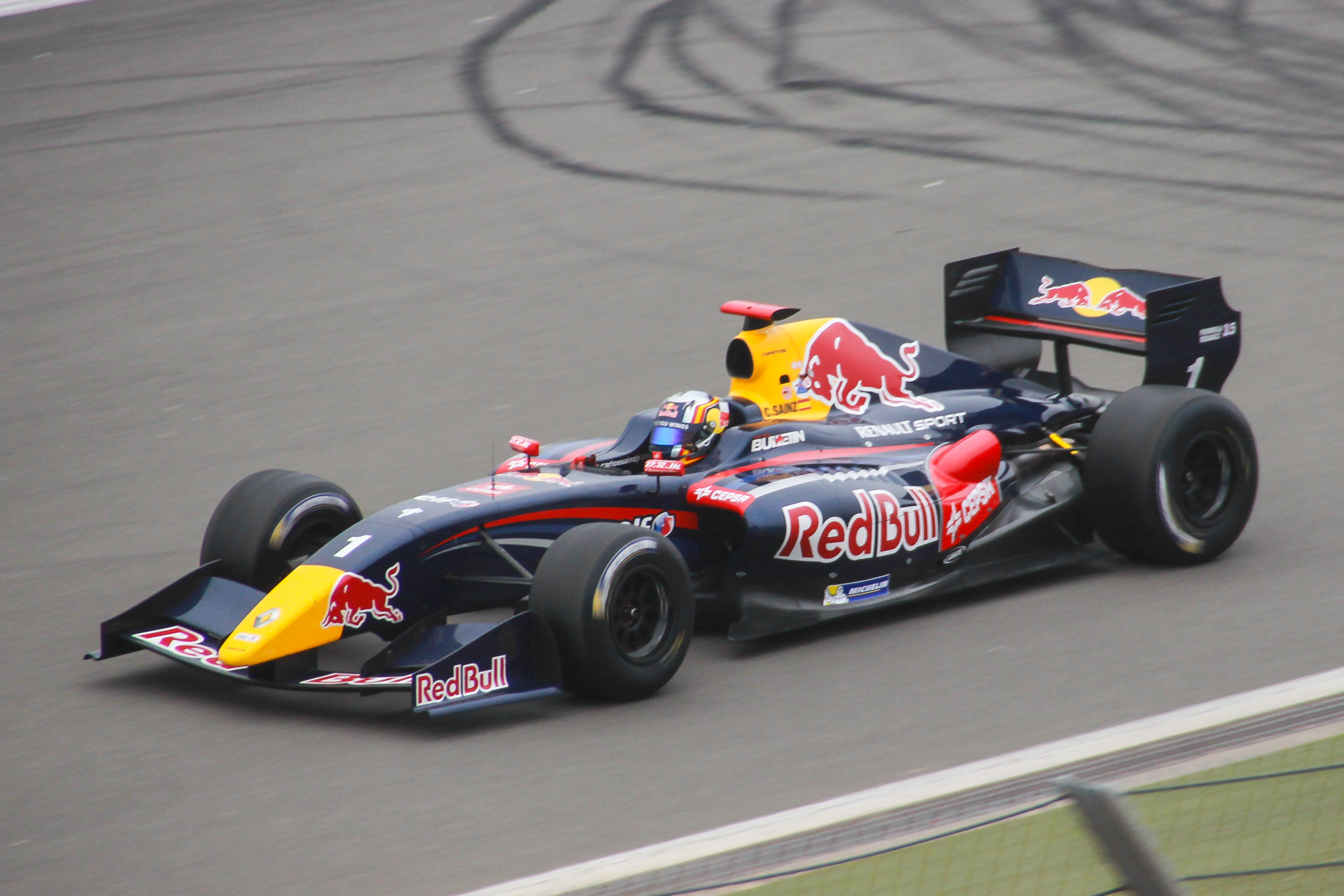
Sainz competing for DAMS during the 2014 Formula Renault 3.5 Series, at the Nürburgring. He took the fifth of seven victories during the 2014 season at the Nürburgring, en route to the championship title.

Sainz raced in Formula Renault 3.5 for the first time in 2013. However, he missed several races in his first season most likely due to his commitment towards GP3. In Monaco, he finished sixth place, most probably due to a challenging start to his GP3 season. He then experienced a double retirement in Spa. He also missed the races in Moscow and Austria. However, he made a comeback in Hungary, securing a seventh-place finish in Race 1. In Race 2, he faced several issues and finished in 22nd place. In France, at the Circuit de Paul Ricard, he had another double retirement. In the last race weekend of the year in Catalunya, he retired in race 1 but managed to score sixth place.

In 2014, Sainz switched teams to DAMS. In the season opener at Monza, he finished 18th in the first race but won the second. He left Monza with 25 points, beating his previous seasons' score by three points. Another win at Aragon meant he doubled his score and in race 2, he finished in fourth. Another fourth place followed at the one race in Monaco. The weekend at Spa followed with another two wins. Moscow followed. 14th and sixth meant that he only took eight points from a possible 50. At the Nürburgring GP Circuit, he won race 1 but in race 2, he retired. In Hungary, he was no match for Roberto Merhi who led by half a minute from the rest of the field in the wet. Another sixth place followed in race 2. In France, he won and scored a total of 50 points to extend his championship lead over Merhi.

== Formula One career ==
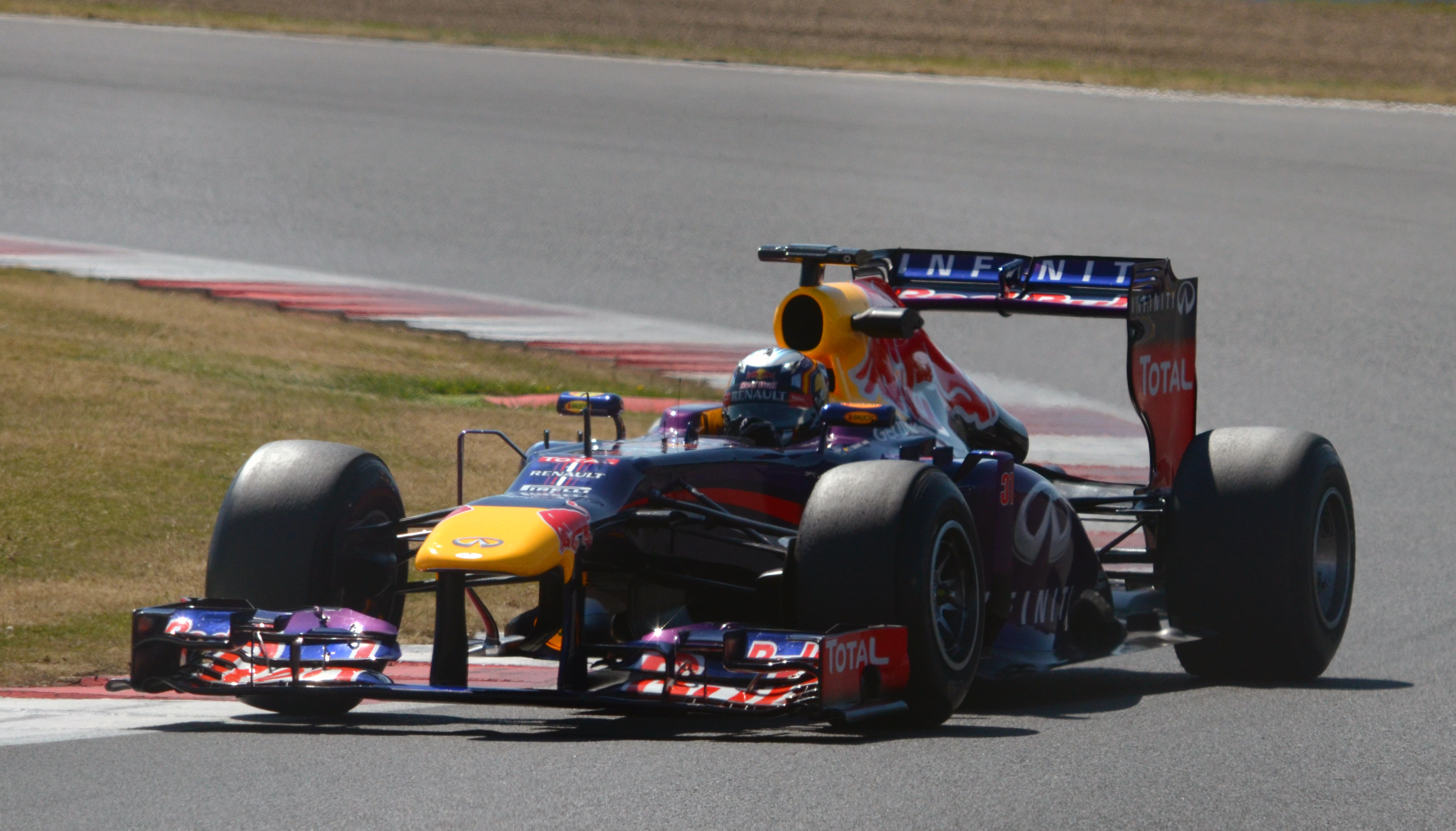
Sainz driving for Red Bull at the Young Driver Test at Silverstone in July 2013

Sainz became part of the Red Bull Junior Team in 2010. His first experience in a Formula One car came at the young drivers' test at Silverstone Circuit in July 2013, where he drove both the Toro Rosso STR8 and the Red Bull RB9. Sainz confirmed that discussions had taken place with the struggling Caterham team for a race debut during the 2014 season but, ultimately, no agreement was reached. As a reward for his Formula Renault 3.5 Series title, Sainz drove the Red Bull RB10 in the post-season test after the 2014 Abu Dhabi Grand Prix.

=== Toro Rosso (2015–2017) ===
==== 2015 ====
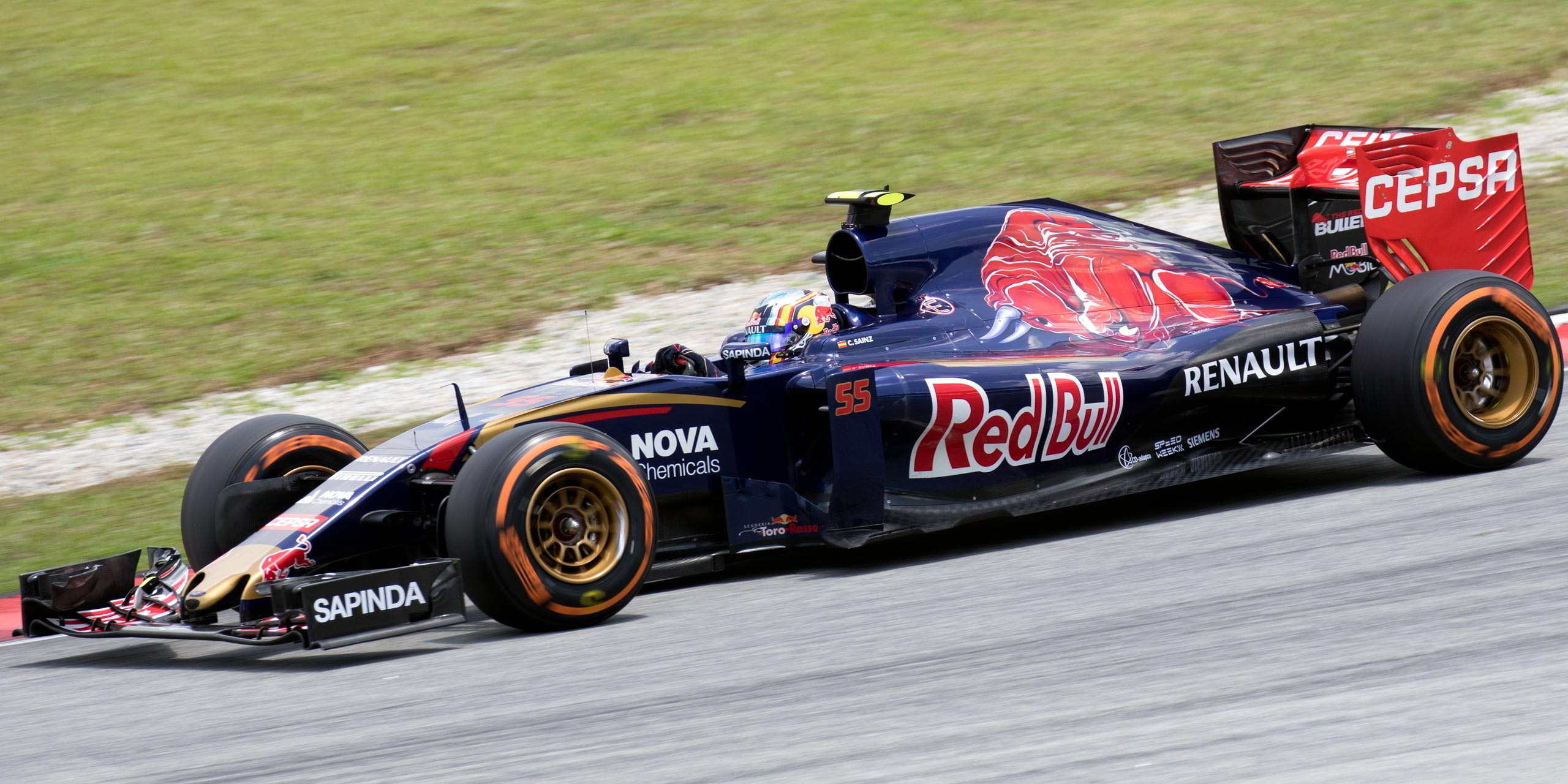
Sainz at the 2015 Malaysian Grand Prix

Sainz drove for Scuderia Toro Rosso in the 2015 season where he partnered Max Verstappen, following Daniil Kvyat's promotion to Red Bull. Sainz selected 55 as his race number. He qualified inside the top ten for his debut, the Australian Grand Prix, and finished the race in ninth position. He scored points again at the Malaysian Grand Prix, but failed to score at the Chinese Grand Prix after spinning and then retired from the Bahrain Grand Prix with a wheel issue. He qualified fifth at the Spanish Grand Prix, his highest grid position of the year, and finished the race ninth. He was forced to start the Monaco Grand Prix from the pit lane after failing to attend the weigh-bridge during qualifying. He recovered to tenth place in the race.

Four consecutive retirements began with electrical failures at the Austrian and British Grands Prix, then a fuel pressure issue at the Hungarian Grand Prix and a power unit issue at the Belgian Grand Prix. A 150 km/h and 46 g impact into the barriers during practice for the Russian Grand Prix resulted in Sainz spending the night in hospital. He missed qualifying but was declared fit to race, however he failed to finish after a brake failure. He crashed in qualifying for the United States Grand Prix and started from last place, but gained ten positions on the first lap and went on to record his best finish of the year with seventh place. Sainz finished his debut season fifteenth in the Drivers' Championship, scoring 18 points to teammate Verstappen's 49.

==== 2016 ====
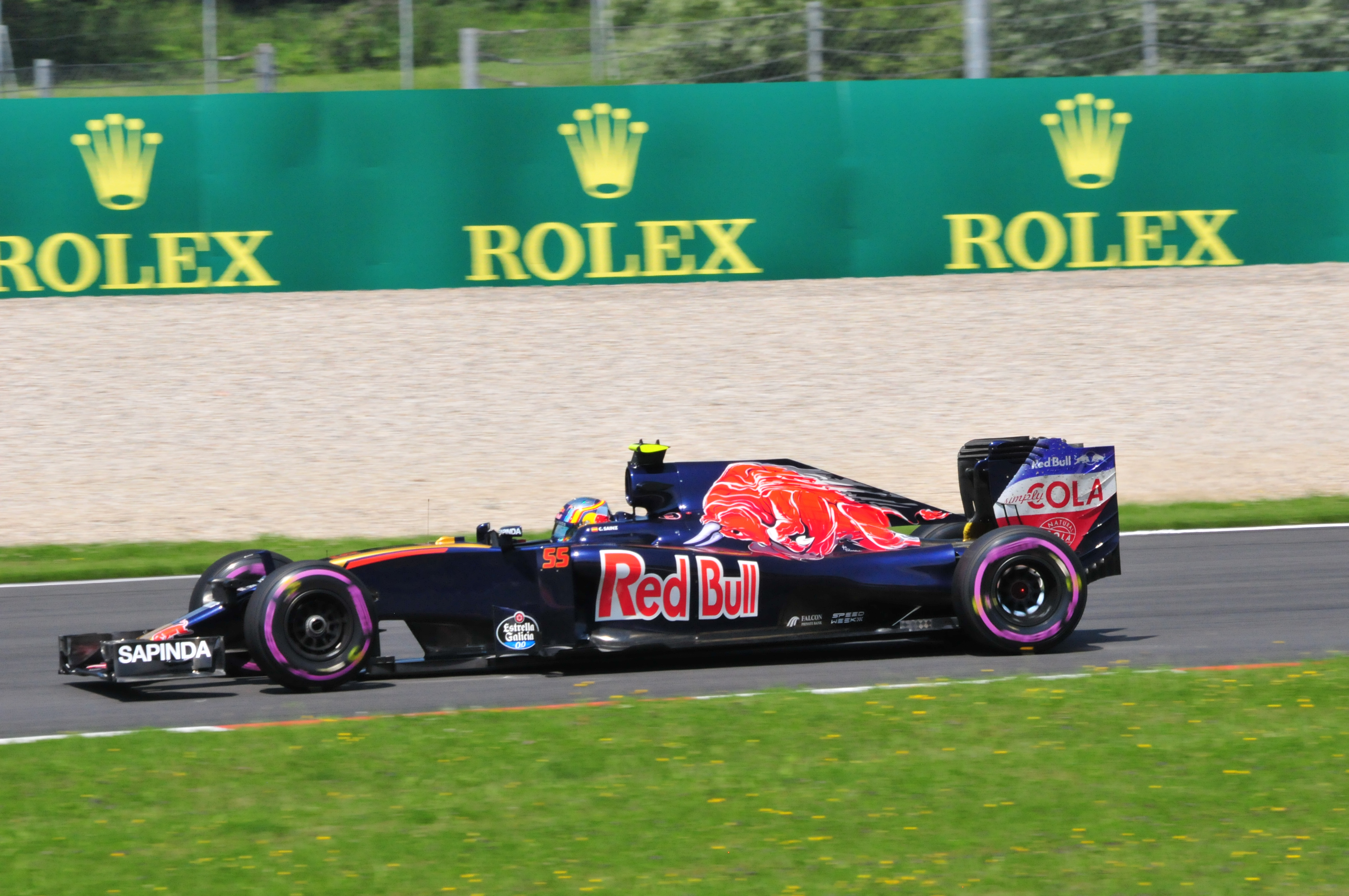
Sainz at the 2016 Austrian Grand Prix

Toro Rosso retained Sainz and Verstappen for the 2016 championship. Sainz qualified seventh and finished ninth at the season-opening Australian Grand Prix, but retired from the Bahrain Grand Prix due to a collision with Sergio Pérez. After the Russian Grand Prix, Sainz gained a new teammate in Daniil Kvyat as Verstappen was promoted to Red Bull. Three points finishes followed for Sainz, including his best career finish with sixth place at the Spanish Grand Prix and a drive from twentieth to ninth place at the Canadian Grand Prix. After a suspension-related retirement at the European Grand Prix, Sainz recorded three consecutive eighth-place finishes.

A run of six races without points followed, including retirement due to a puncture at the Belgian Grand Prix and a first-lap collision with Nico Hülkenberg at the Singapore Grand Prix having started sixth. Sainz equalled his best race result at the United States Grand Prix with sixth place and scored the same result at the Brazilian Grand Prix after starting fifteenth. He retired from the season-ending Abu Dhabi Grand Prix due to a collision with Jolyon Palmer. Sainz ended the season twelfth in the Drivers' Championship, scoring 46 of Toro Rosso's 63 points.

==== 2017 ====
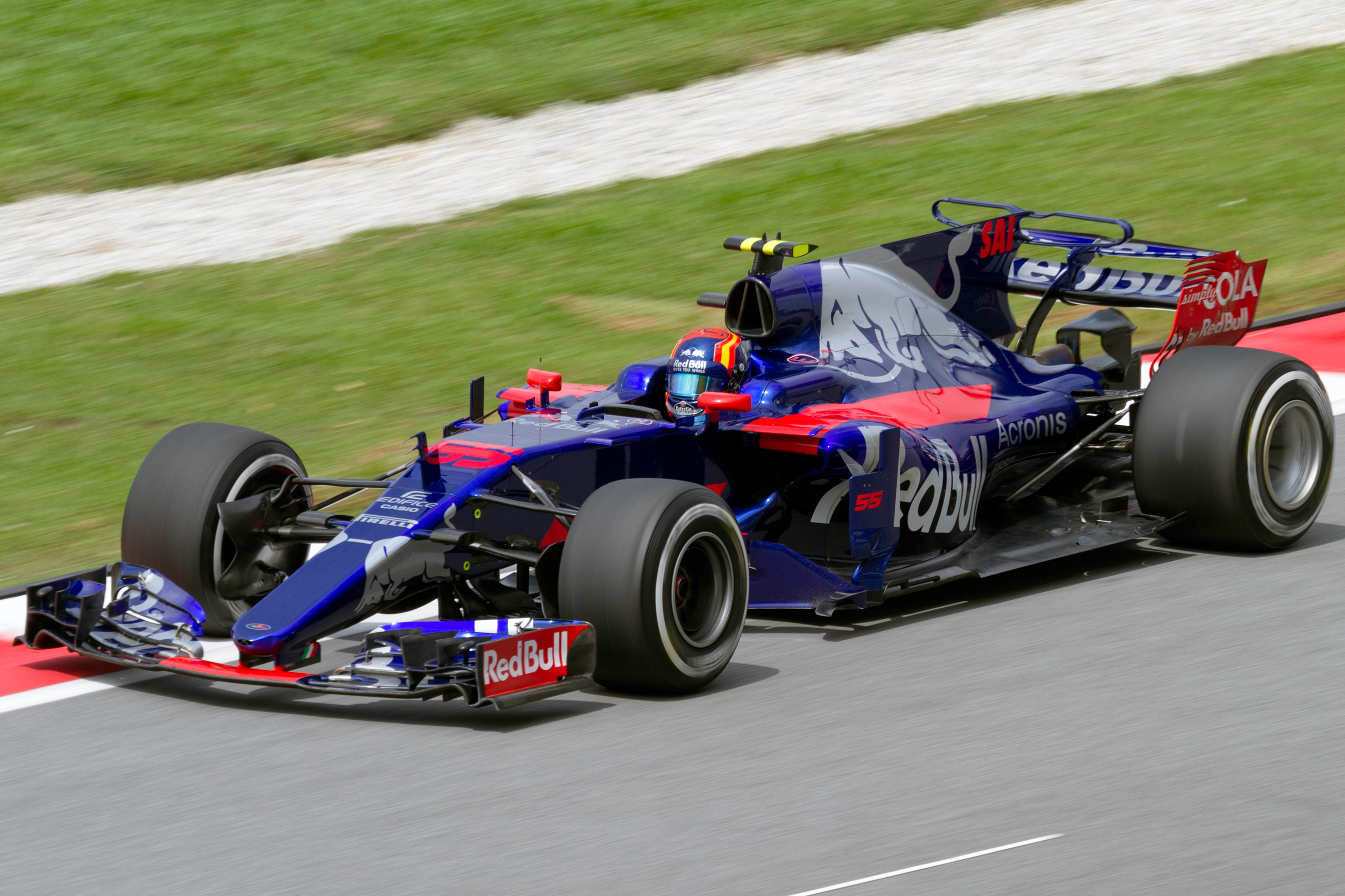
Sainz at the 2017 Malaysian Grand Prix

Sainz and Kvyat remained with Toro Rosso for the 2017 season. Sainz scored points in the opening two races, but a collision with Lance Stroll eliminated him from the Bahrain Grand Prix. Both drivers blamed each other for the incident, but Sainz was handed a grid penalty for the next race. Three points finishes followed including sixth place at the Monaco Grand Prix. Sainz was again handed a grid penalty for a first-lap collision with Romain Grosjean and Felipe Massa at the Canadian Grand Prix. Sainz spun on the first lap of the Azerbaijan Grand Prix, attempting to avoid a collision with teammate Kvyat, and recovered to finish eighth.

Prior to the Austrian Grand Prix, Sainz commented that it was "unlikely" he would remain with Toro Rosso for a fourth year. Red Bull team principal Christian Horner rejected this, stating that Sainz would race for Toro Rosso in 2018. Sainz retired from the Austrian Grand Prix with an engine problem and was eliminated on the first lap of the British Grand Prix after a collision with Kvyat. Prior to the Singapore Grand Prix it was announced that Sainz would join Renault for 2018, on loan from Red Bull. He finished the race in a career-best fourth place, in what he described as his "best day in Formula One". He was joined at Toro Rosso by Pierre Gasly for the Malaysian Grand Prix after Kvyat was dropped by the team. Sainz retired from the race due to an engine problem. He crashed in practice for the Japanese Grand Prix and again on the opening lap of the race. At this stage of the season, Sainz had scored 48 of Toro Rosso's 52 points.

=== Renault (2017–2018) ===
==== 2017 ====
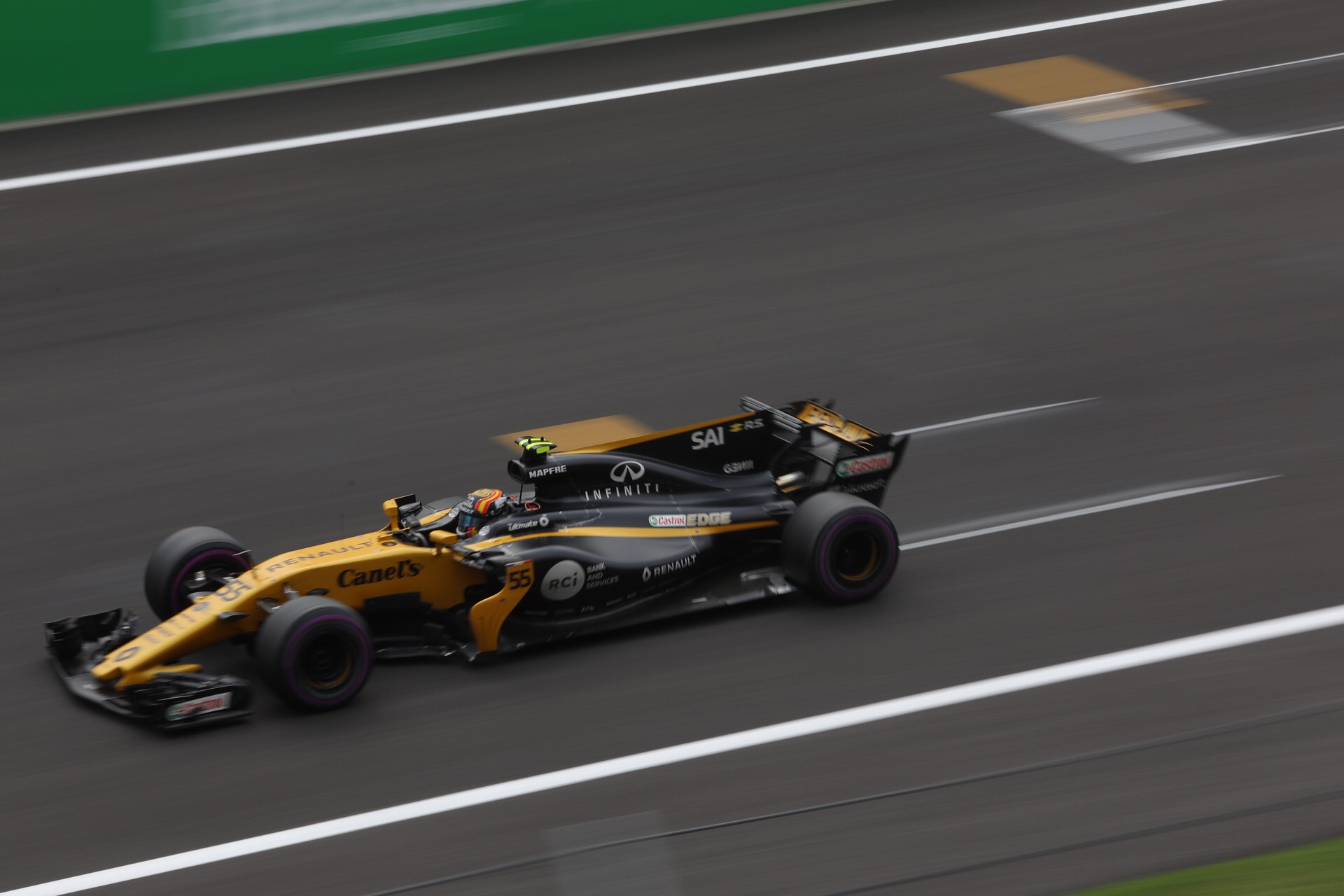
Sainz at the 2017 Mexican Grand Prix

Sainz's move to Renault was brought forward and he replaced Jolyon Palmer and partnered Nico Hülkenberg at the team for the final four races of 2017, beginning with the United States Grand Prix where he started and finished seventh. Sainz made his way from eighth to fifth place on the first lap of the Mexican Grand Prix but then spun and had to pit for new tyres. He later retired from the race with steering problems. He failed to finish the season-ending Abu Dhabi Grand Prix after he was released from a pit stop with a loose wheel. Sainz ended the 2017 season ninth in the Drivers' Championship, scoring 54 points.

==== 2018 ====
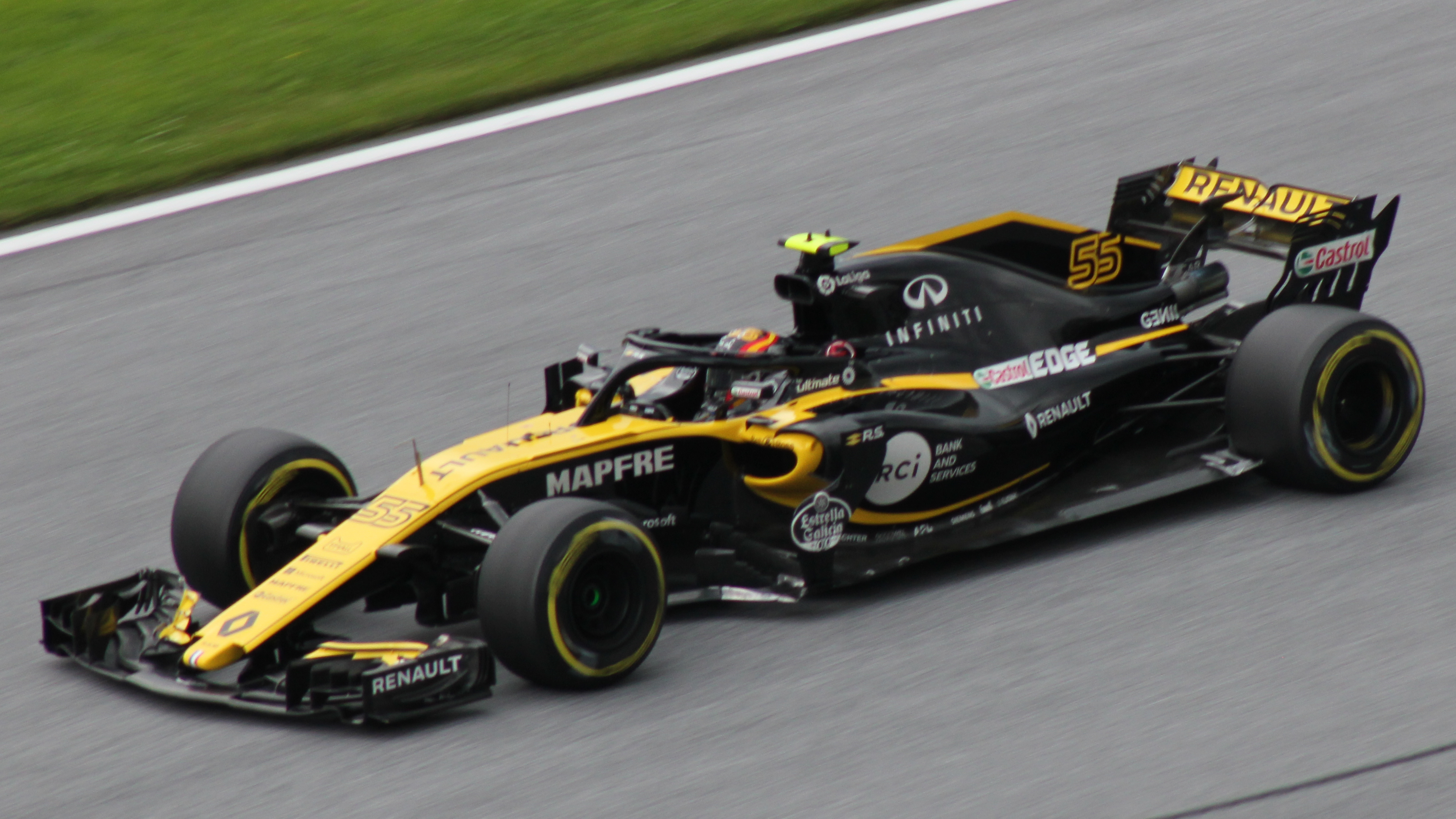
Sainz at the 2018 Austrian Grand Prix

Over the first eight races of 2018, Sainz qualified in the top ten at each of them and scored points in all but one, finishing eleventh at the Bahrain Grand Prix. These results included the Azerbaijan Grand Prix where he took advantage of a collision between Red Bull teammates Max Verstappen and Daniel Ricciardo to finish a season-high position of fifth. Sainz described his Monaco Grand Prix as a "disaster" and criticised the team's tyre strategy having started eighth and finished tenth. He had run in sixth place for much of the French Grand Prix but dropped to eighth place at the finish after his MGU-K failed. Three races without points followed, including a race-ending crash with Romain Grosjean at the British Grand Prix and a penalty for overtaking during safety car conditions at the German Grand Prix.

Sainz scored points at five of the next seven races, including a season's-best qualifying performance of fifth place at the Hungarian Grand Prix. Damage received from contact with Sergey Sirotkin on the first lap of the Russian Grand Prix resulted in a seventeenth-place finish. Battery issues caused Sainz's retirement from the Mexican Grand Prix. He ended the season with a drive from eleventh on the grid to sixth place at the Abu Dhabi Grand Prix. Sainz finished the season tenth in the Drivers' Championship, three places behind teammate Hülkenberg, scoring 53 points to Hülkenberg's 69. Sainz scored points in thirteen out of the nineteen races he finished. Sainz was replaced by Daniel Ricciardo at Renault for the following season, with the team opting to keep Hülkenberg on instead of Sainz.

=== McLaren (2019–2020) ===
==== 2019: Maiden podium ====
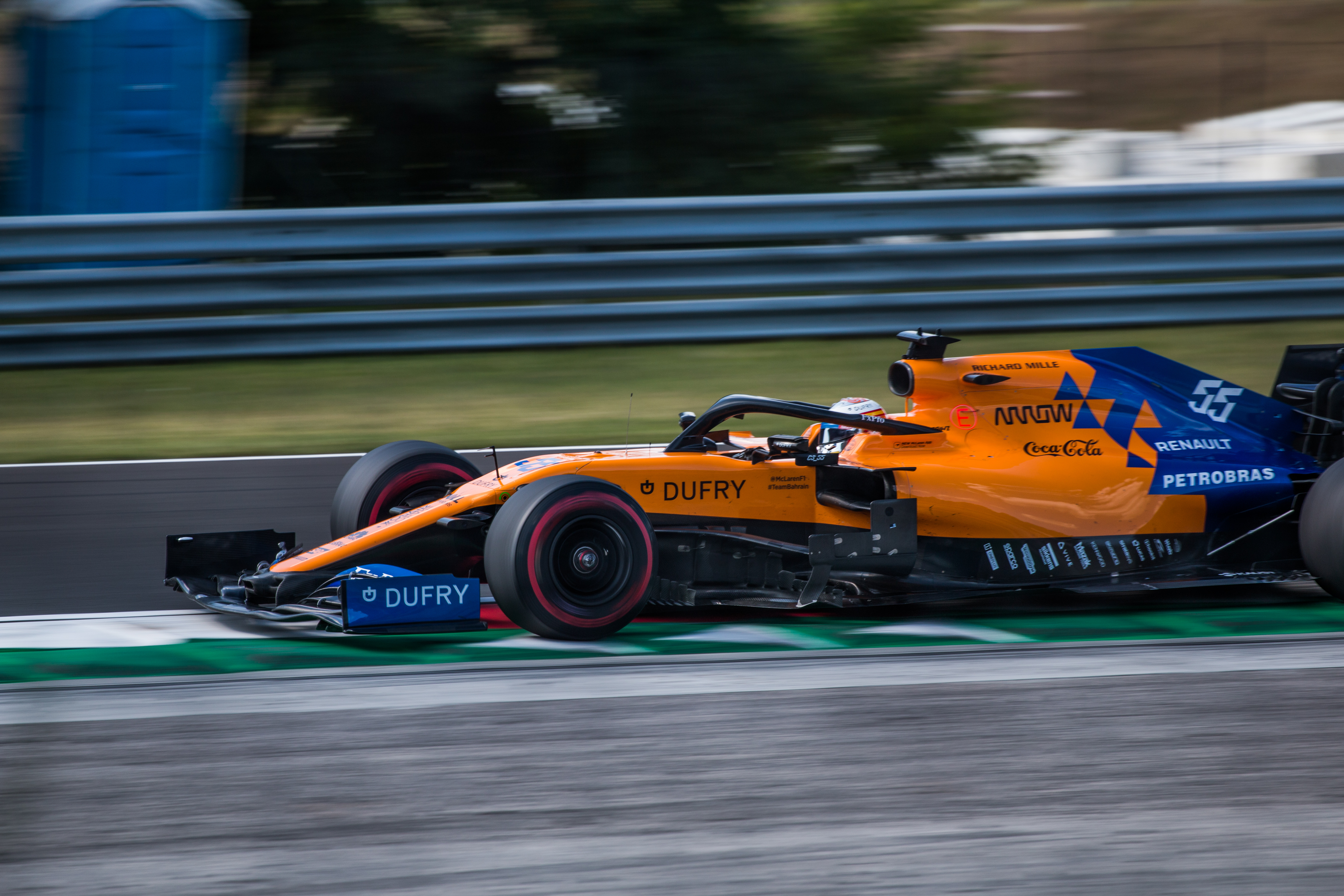
Sainz at the 2019 Hungarian Grand Prix

Sainz moved to McLaren for the 2019 season, ending his association with Red Bull. He replaced Fernando Alonso and partnered rookie Lando Norris. Sainz had an unlucky start to the season with no points in the first three races due to an engine fire at the Australian Grand Prix and first-lap collisions at the Bahrain and Chinese Grands Prix. Sainz consistently scored points thereafter, often finishing as the highest-placed driver behind the top three teams of Mercedes, Ferrari and Red Bull. He scored points at eight of the next nine races; notable results were finishing eighth at the Austrian Grand Prix having started nineteenth, and fifth place at the German Grand Prix despite an incident where he spun and stopped on a wet section of the track.

Sainz encountered power issues and retired on the second lap of the Belgian Grand Prix. At the subsequent Italian Grand Prix, he was forced to retire when a wheel was fitted incorrectly during a pit stop. Then at the Singapore Grand Prix, a collision with Nico Hülkenberg and a long pit stop caused him to finish outside the points positions. At the Brazilian Grand Prix, Sainz started in twentieth and last place following an engine problem in qualifying. He had made his way to fifth place by the penultimate lap, which became fourth place when Alex Albon was spun around by Lewis Hamilton ahead. Sainz was later elevated to third place after Hamilton received a penalty, earning him his first podium in Formula One. At the season-ending Abu Dhabi Grand Prix, Sainz passed Hülkenberg on the final lap to take tenth place, scoring one point and earning sixth place in the drivers' championship, one point ahead of Pierre Gasly and four ahead of Albon, both of whom spent part of the season in the superior Red Bull. Sainz scored 96 points over the season, compared to 49 for teammate Norris.

==== 2020 ====
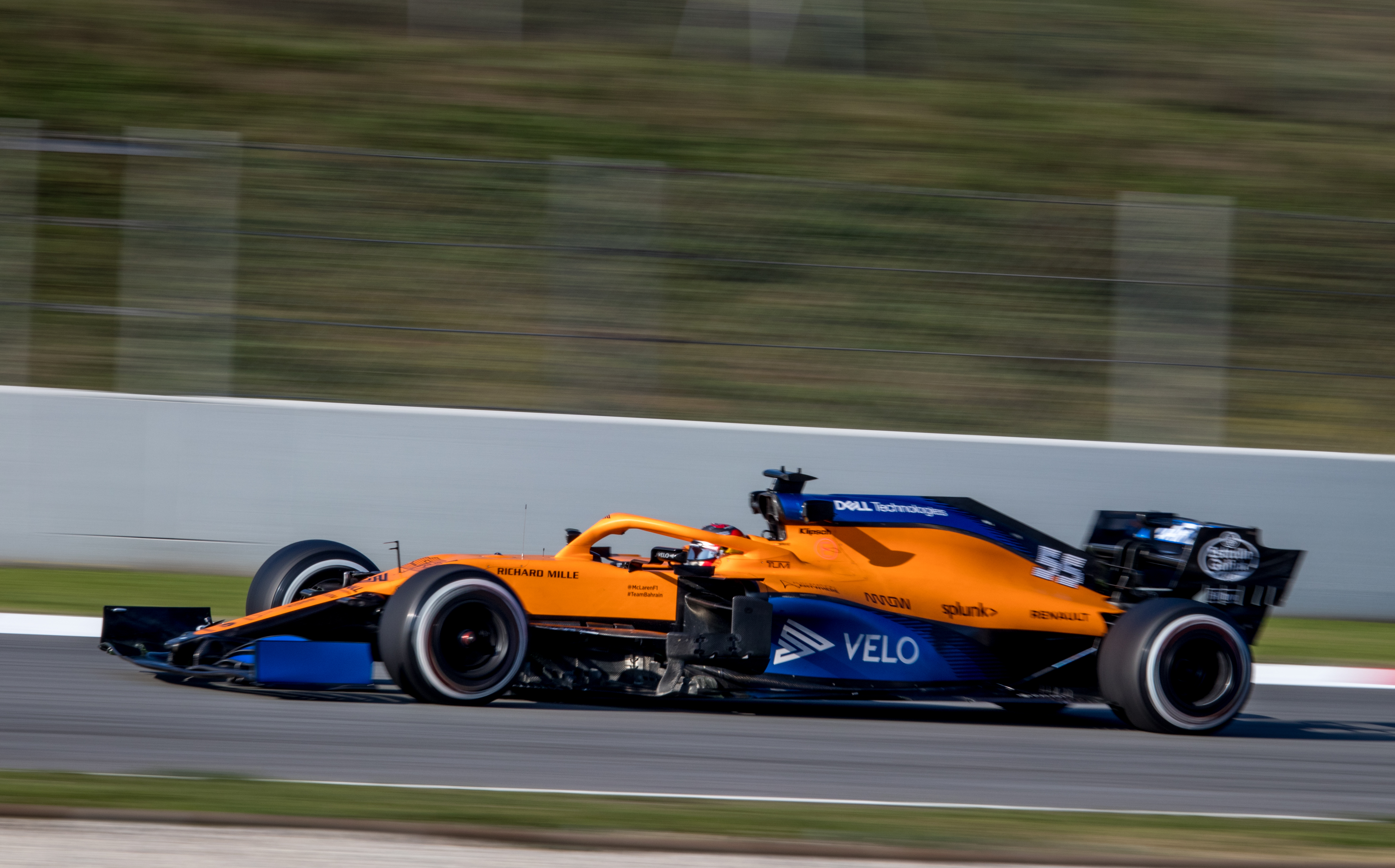
Sainz at pre-season testing in 2020

Sainz remained at McLaren alongside Norris for 2020, and began the season with a fifth-place finish at the Austrian Grand Prix. He qualified third for the Styrian Grand Prix, his best career qualifying result at that time. A slow pit stop contributed to him dropping to ninth place by the finish, however Sainz achieved his first fastest lap in Formula One and in doing so set a new Red Bull Ring track record. Sainz was in fourth place with two laps of the British Grand Prix remaining but suffered a tyre puncture and was ultimately classified thirteenth. He started the 70th Anniversary Grand Prix outside the top ten, but had progressed to fourth place when he entered the pits. A slow pit stop then dropped him back and he went on to finish thirteenth. He finished his home race, the Spanish Grand Prix, in sixth place, but then failed to start the Belgian Grand Prix due to a power unit issue on a reconnaissance lap.

At the Italian Grand Prix, Sainz qualified third behind the two Mercedes drivers. He lost places during the pit stops and was in sixth place when the race was red-flagged for Charles Leclerc's accident. He passed three cars and benefited from Lewis Hamilton's penalty to move up to second place behind Pierre Gasly with twenty laps remaining. He ultimately finished 0.4 seconds behind Gasly to take his second podium and what was at the time his career best race finish. Sainz retired from the next two races; he was involved in a multi-car start-line accident at the Tuscan Grand Prix and then crashed into a wall on the first lap of the Russian Grand Prix. Seven consecutive points finishes then followed. He finished sixth at the Portuguese Grand Prix having briefly led the race after gaining six positions in the first two laps. He started the Turkish Grand Prix in fifteenth place due to a penalty for impeding Sergio Pérez in qualifying, but gained six positions on the first lap and went on to finish fifth. A brake failure in qualifying at the Bahrain Grand Prix caused him to qualify fifteenth, but he progressed to fifth place by the end of the race.

Sainz finished the 2020 season sixth in the Drivers' Championship for the second consecutive year. He accumulated 105 points to Norris's 97 and claimed six top-five finishes which, at the time, were both career highs.

=== Ferrari (2021–2024) ===
==== 2021: First season at Ferrari ====
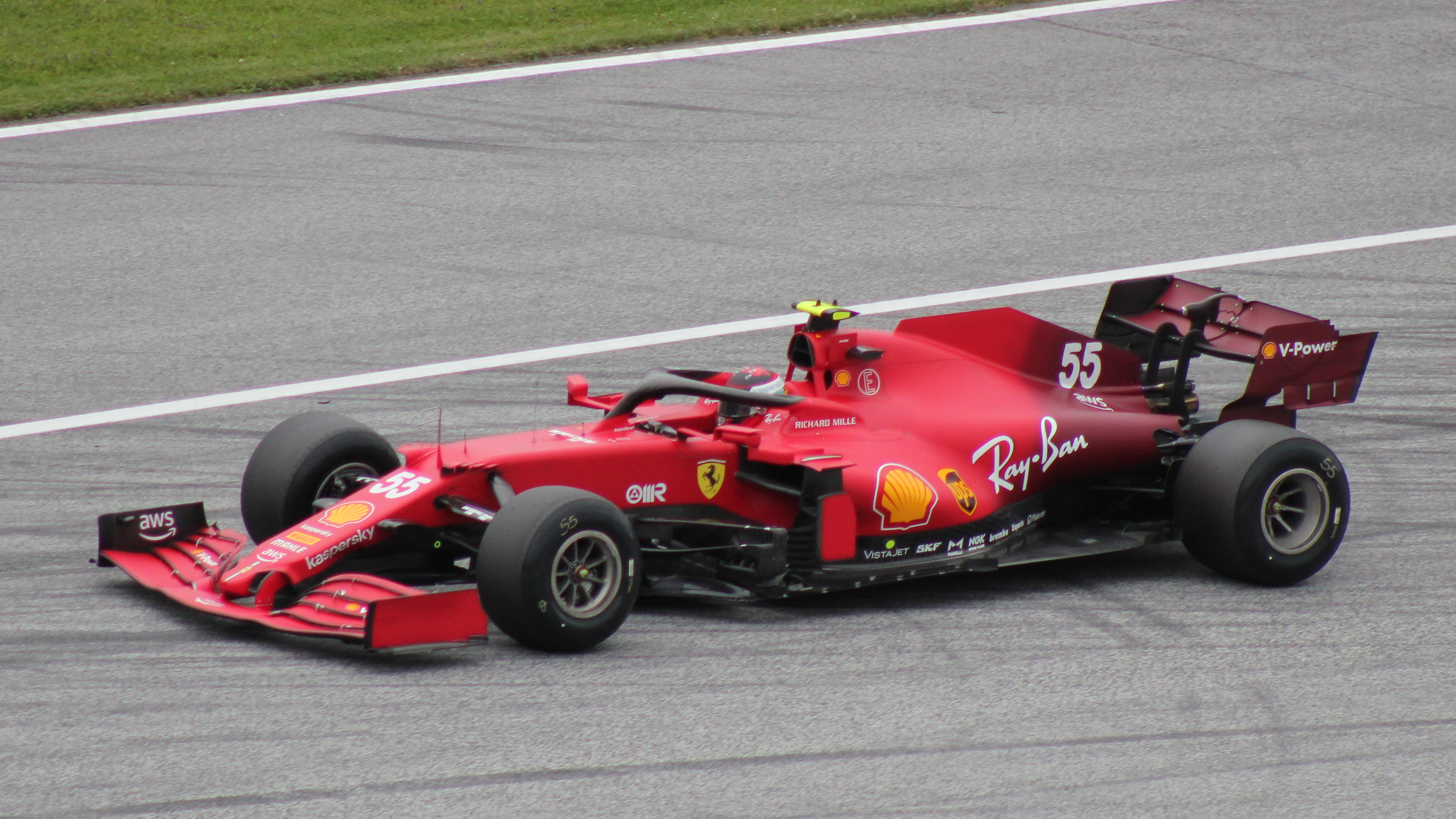
Sainz at the 2021 Austrian Grand Prix

Sainz joined Scuderia Ferrari on a two-year contract from the 2021 season partnering Charles Leclerc and replacing Sebastian Vettel. He qualified and finished in eighth place at the Bahrain Grand Prix, his first race for the team. He started eleventh at the Emilia Romagna Grand Prix but progressed to fifth place by the end of the race. He failed to score points at the Portuguese Grand Prix despite starting fifth, stating "we got it wrong with strategy". He took his third career podium and first with Ferrari at the Monaco Grand Prix, where he benefited from Leclerc's failure to start and a pit stop issue for Valtteri Bottas to finish second. Tyre wear issues meant neither Ferrari driver scored points at the French Grand Prix. Sainz recovered from a twelfth-place start at the Styrian Grand Prix to finish sixth. A collision with George Russell on the first lap of sprint qualifying at the British Grand Prix dropped Sainz to the back of the field, but he recovered places in sprint qualifying and in the race to finish sixth.

Sainz crashed in qualifying for the Hungarian Grand Prix and started fifteenth. He finished fourth on track, but claimed his fourth career podium finish after Sebastian Vettel's disqualification. He achieved his then-career-best qualifying position at the Russian Grand Prix, starting second, and took the lead from former teammate Lando Norris on the first lap. Sainz went on to finish the race third. He recovered to eighth place at the Turkish Grand Prix having started from the back of the grid due to engine component penalties. Sainz achieved his fourth podium of the season at the Abu Dhabi Grand Prix, but criticised the handling of the final-lap restart as being positioned behind lapped cars "nearly cost [him his] podium".

Sainz ended the season fifth in the Drivers' Championship with 164.5 points, two positions and 5.5 points ahead of teammate Leclerc. His ability to adapt quickly to Ferrari and his performances relative to Leclerc were widely praised.

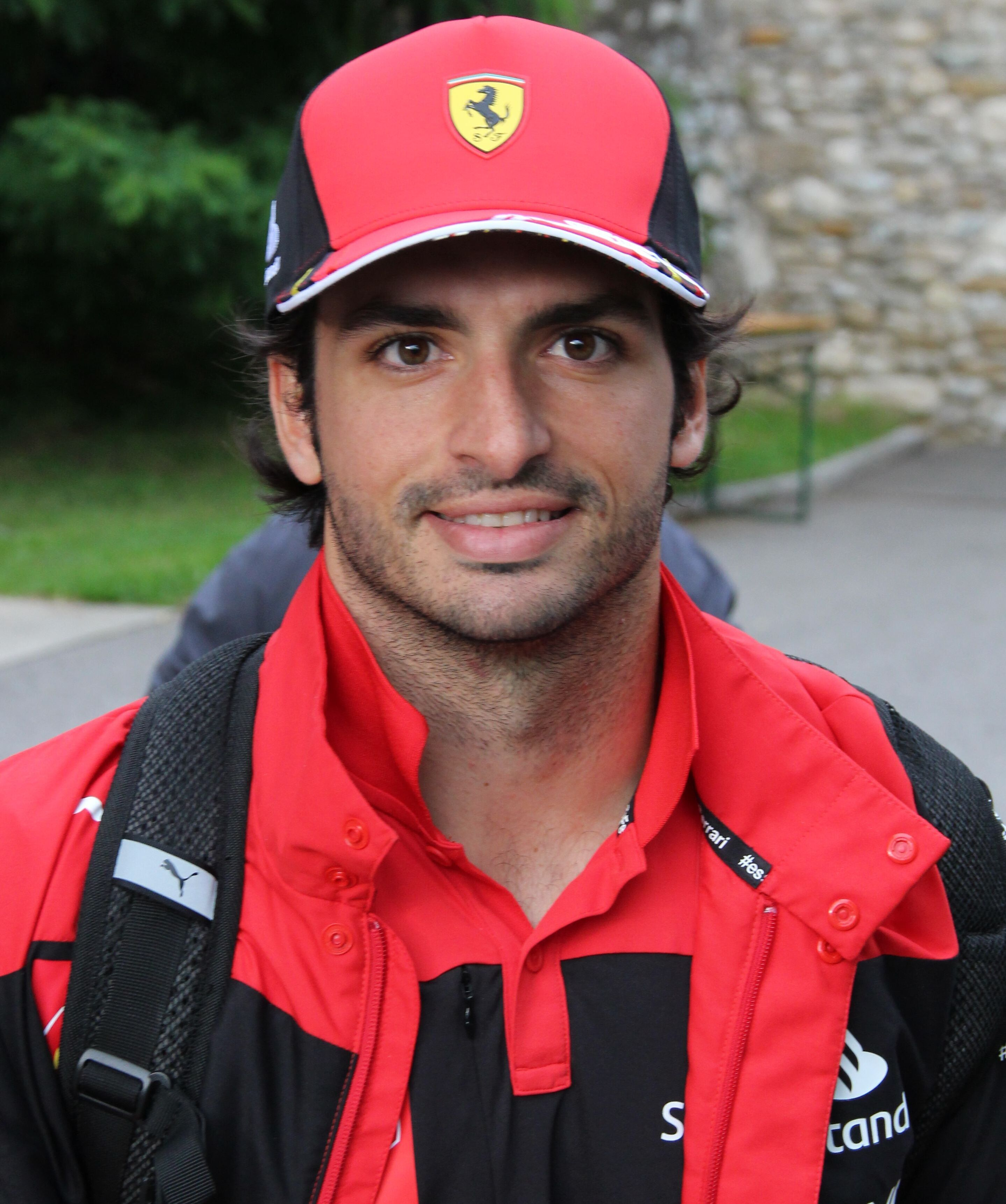
Sainz in 2022

==== 2022: Maiden win and pole position ====
Sainz continued at Ferrari alongside Leclerc for 2022. He qualified third for the season-opening Bahrain Grand Prix. He ran in third place until Max Verstappen's retirement, allowing him into second place behind Leclerc to claim a Ferrari 1–2 finish and an early lead in the Constructors' Championship. A mistake and then a red flag in qualifying at the Australian Grand Prix meant he started in ninth place. He dropped places at the start and then spun into the gravel, ending his race on lap two. He crashed in qualifying for the Emilia Romagna Grand Prix and then a collision with Daniel Ricciardo ended his race at the first corner. He finished fourth at the Spanish Grand Prix, his best ever result at his home race, despite having earlier spun and dropped to eleventh. Sainz qualified and finished second at the Monaco Grand Prix, but a hydraulics issue caused his third retirement of the year at the Azerbaijan Grand Prix. He was runner-up at the Canadian Grand Prix, less than a second behind Verstappen.

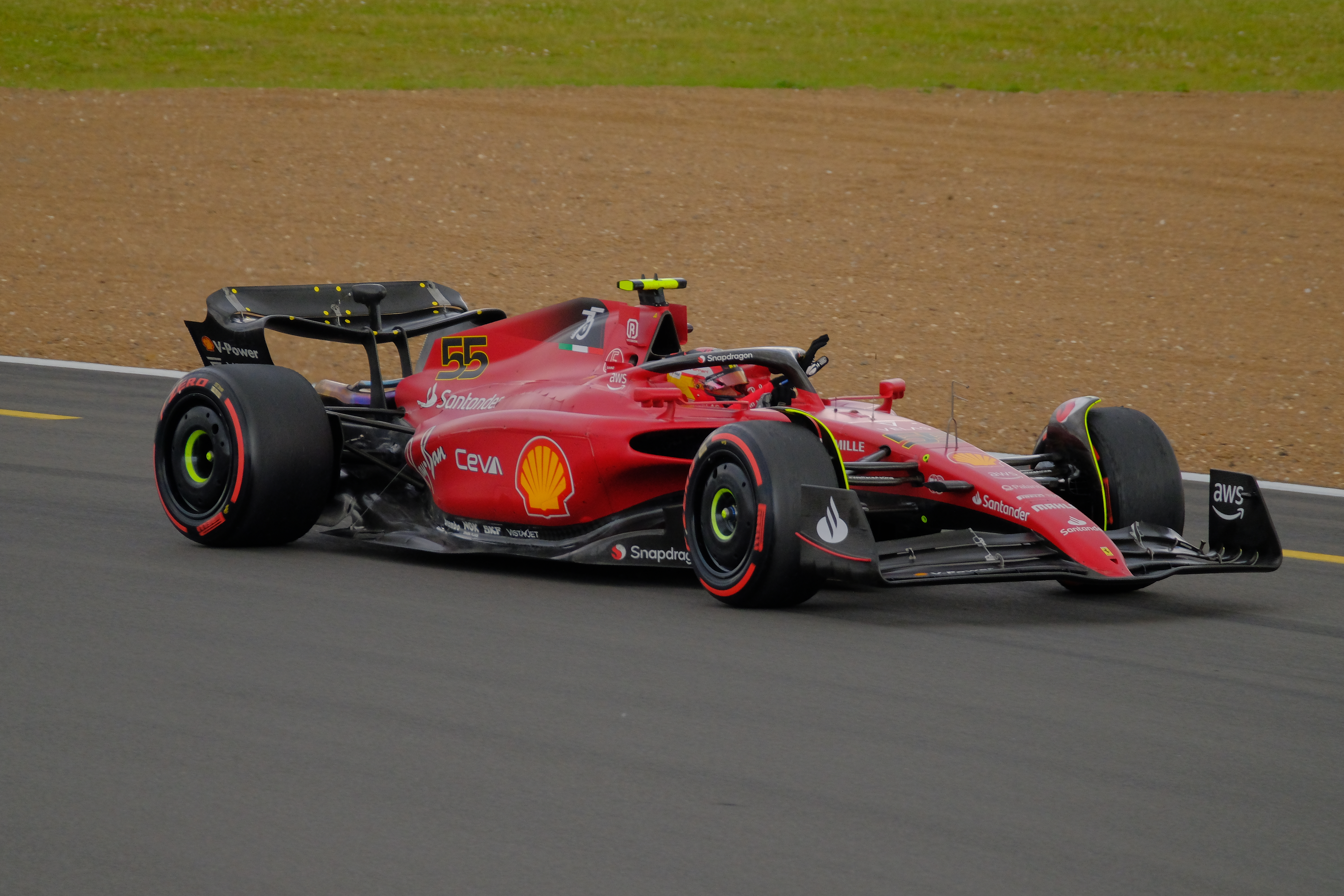
Sainz after claiming his first race win at the 2022 British Grand Prix

For his 150th Formula One race start, the British Grand Prix, Sainz took his first Formula One pole position in a wet qualifying session, beating Verstappen by 0.034 seconds. He was overtaken in the race by Verstappen, but regained the lead when Verstappen slowed with damage. He pitted for soft tyres in the closing laps and passed Leclerc to claim his maiden win in Formula One. Sainz was running third at the Austrian Grand Prix when an engine failure ended his race. He started at the back of the grid at the French Grand Prix after taking new engine components and finished fifth despite a time penalty for an unsafe pit release. He took his second pole position at the Belgian Grand Prix, promoted to the front as Verstappen took an engine penalty, but dropped behind both Red Bulls to finish third.

Sainz finished fifth at the Dutch Grand Prix but was demoted to eighth by a penalty for an unsafe pit release. He started eighteenth at the Italian Grand Prix with an engine component penalty but recovered to finish fourth. At the rain-affected Japanese Grand Prix, he crashed out from third place on the opening lap. He claimed his third pole position at the United States Grand Prix, but retired with damage after being hit by George Russell at the first corner. After the final race, Sainz had matched his 2021 position with fifth in the Drivers' Championship and scored 246 points to Leclerc's 308.

Sainz signed a contract extension until the end of 2024.

==== 2023: Only non Red Bull winner ====
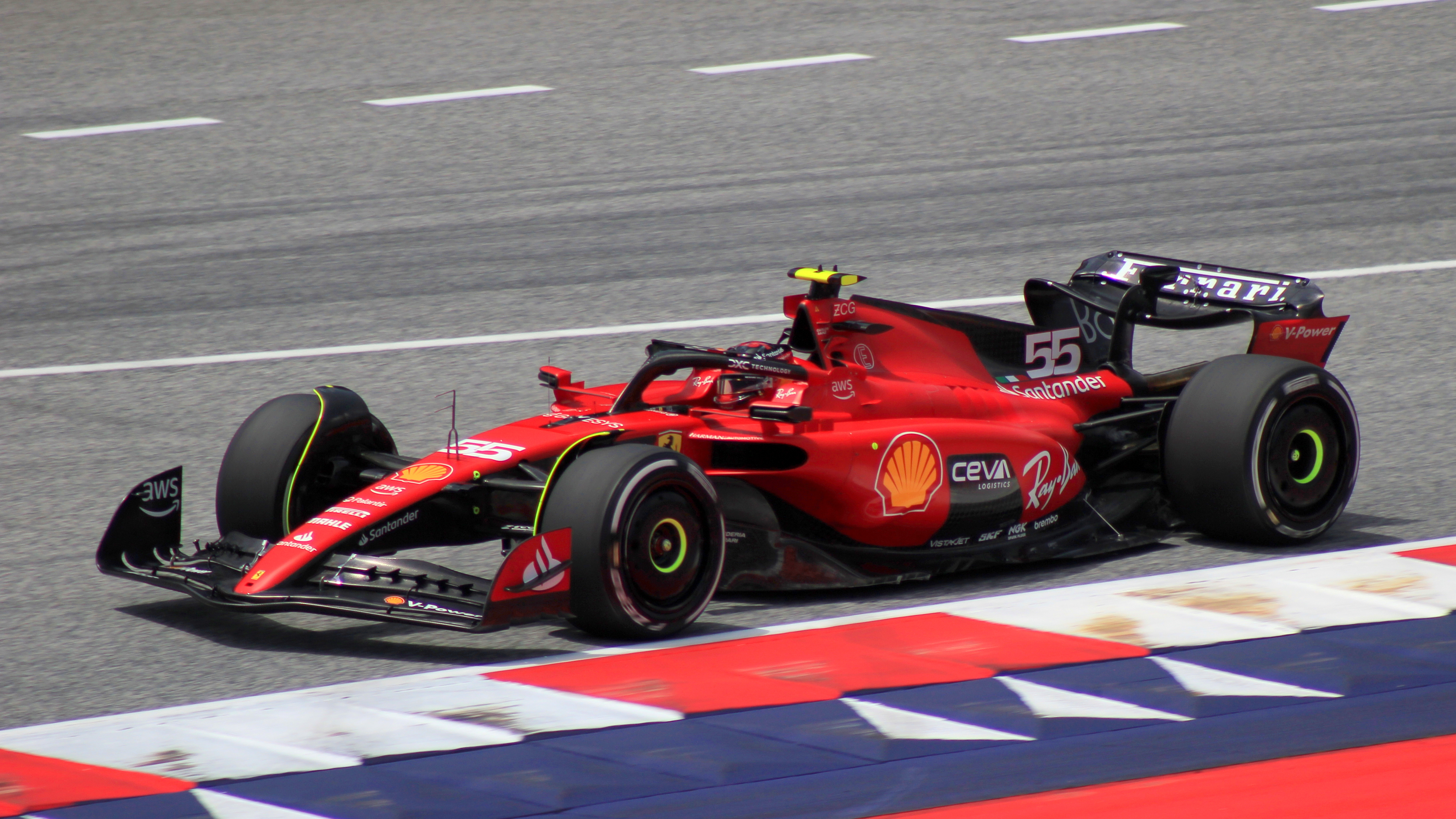
Sainz at the 2023 Austrian Grand Prix

Sainz began the 2023 season by qualifying and finishing fourth at the Bahrain Grand Prix. He finished fourth at the Australian Grand Prix but was penalised and demoted to twelfth place for making contact with Fernando Alonso at the second restart. Sainz criticised the penalty as being "unfair" and Alonso agreed that it was too harsh; Ferrari lodged a formal protest against the decision but were unsuccessful. Sainz qualified third at the Miami Grand Prix but finished fifth. He crashed in practice at the Monaco Grand Prix and spun during the race, dropping him from fourth at the start to eighth at the finish. He qualified second at his home race, the Spanish Grand Prix, behind Max Verstappen. He was unable to hold off the Mercedes cars or Verstappen's teammate Sergio Pérez and finished the race fifth, later commenting that tyre degradation was a weakness of his team's car.

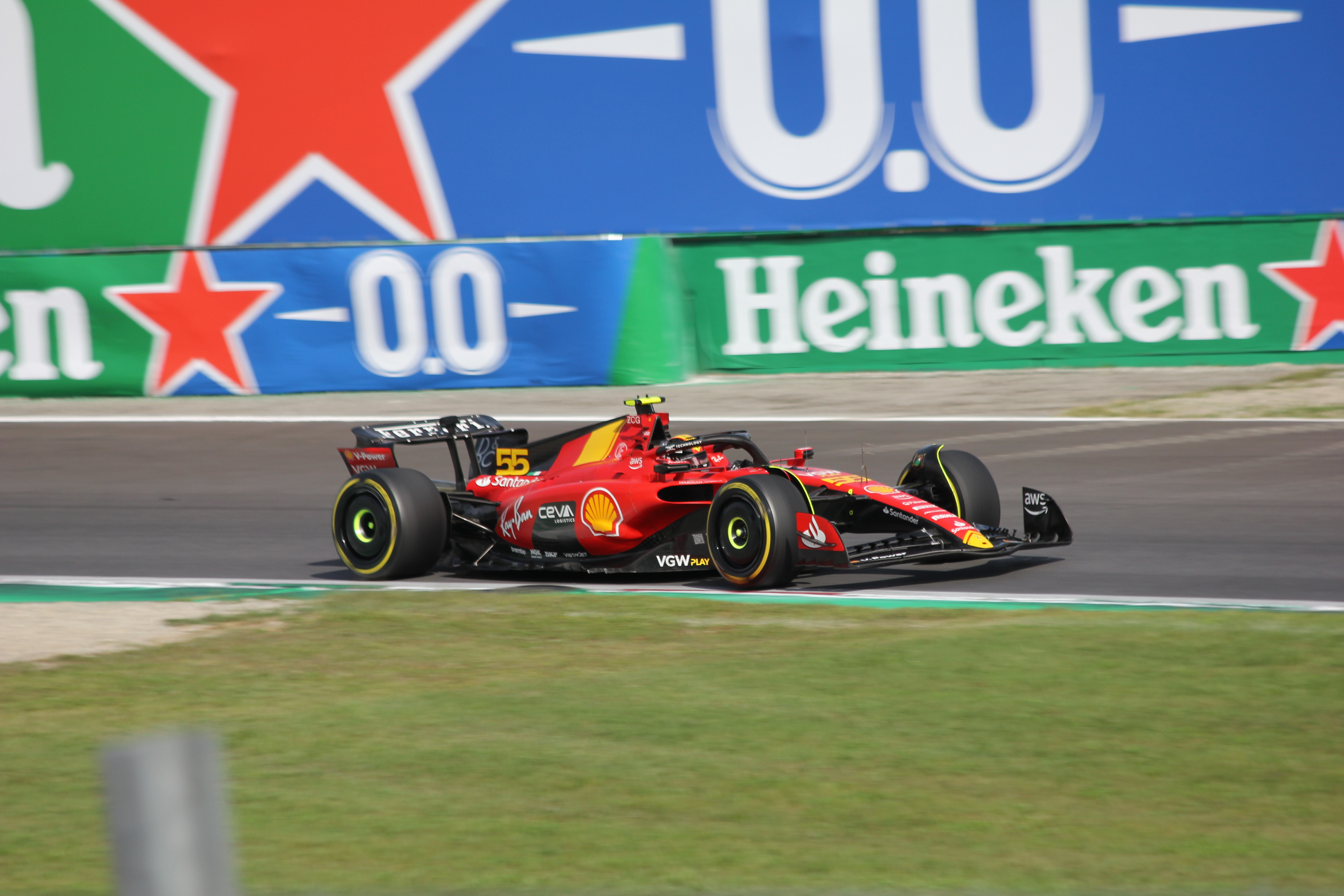
Sainz at the 2023 Italian Grand Prix

Sainz crashed in practice at the Canadian Grand Prix and was then penalised for impeding Pierre Gasly in qualifying, causing him to start the race eleventh. He recovered to finish fifth. He started the British Grand Prix fifth, however both Ferrari drivers made pit stops prior to a safety car period that other drivers took advantage of, dropping Sainz to tenth place at the finish line. At the Hungarian Grand Prix, he crashed in practice and then qualified eleventh. He scored points by finishing the race eighth. He scored points again by finishing fourth in the Belgian Grand Prix sprint, but retired from the main race due to damage from a first-lap collision with Oscar Piastri. He achieved his first pole position of the year at the Italian Grand Prix, 0.013 seconds ahead of Verstappen. He was passed by both Red Bulls during the race but defended from teammate Leclerc to finish third, his first podium of the season. He took pole position again at the next race, the Singapore Grand Prix, and converted this into his second Formula One victory. This ended Red Bull's streak of fifteen consecutive wins and Max Verstappen's win streak of ten, and marked the only race of 2023 not won by Red Bull. Sainz led the entire race distance and he and former teammate Lando Norris held off Mercedes drivers George Russell and Lewis Hamilton in the closing laps.

Sainz scored points in the Qatar Grand Prix sprint, but qualified twelfth for the main race and then failed to start due to a fuel leak. He finished fourth at the United States Grand Prix but was promoted to the podium after Hamilton's disqualification. He qualified second at the Mexico City Grand Prix to make an all-Ferrari front row, but both cars were overtaken by Verstappen and Hamilton in the race. At the inaugural Las Vegas Grand Prix, Sainz hit a loose manhole cover in practice, causing the first practice session to be cancelled and the second to be delayed so that officials could inspect the rest of the track. He went on to qualify second behind Leclerc, but the damage to his car had required Ferrari to replace components and resulted in a ten-place grid penalty, which Ferrari team principal Frédéric Vasseur described as "unacceptable". Sainz finished the race sixth. He crashed in practice at the season-ending Abu Dhabi Grand Prix and placed sixteenth in qualifying, after which he accused other drivers of deliberately impeding him. Ferrari left him out on track until the final lap in the hope of a safety car, but with no chance of scoring points, the team retired his car in the pits. Sainz described the result, which dropped him from fourth in the Drivers' Championship before the race to seventh, as "very disappointing". He ended his third season with Ferrari on 200 points to Leclerc's 206.

==== 2024: Final season at Ferrari ====
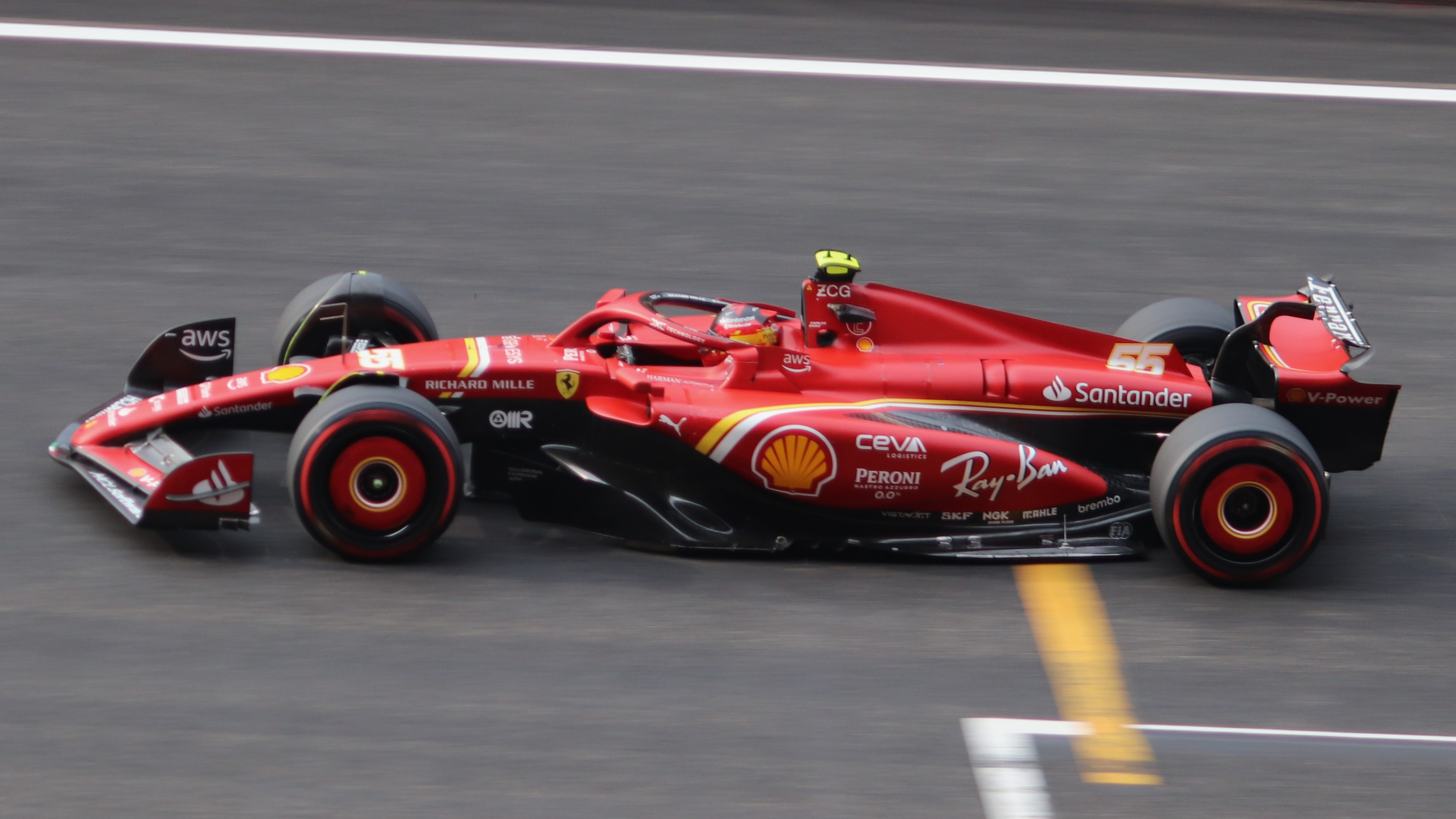
Sainz at the 2024 Chinese Grand Prix

At the Bahrain Grand Prix, Sainz began the 2024 season by qualifying fourth and finishing on the podium in third, ahead of teammate Charles Leclerc. During the Saudi Arabian Grand Prix weekend, Sainz fell ill with appendicitis and was unable to participate. While he took part in FP1 and FP2, he missed the rest of the weekend to undergo surgery; he was replaced by reserve driver Oliver Bearman. Having recovered from his surgery, Sainz returned at the Australian Grand Prix, qualifying second. He capitalised on Max Verstappen's retirement to win the race ahead of Leclerc, marking Sainz's third Formula One race victory and the first Ferrari one-two finish since the 2022 Bahrain Grand Prix. He took another podium finish at the Japanese Grand Prix, passing Leclerc to finish third.

After three races without a podium, Sainz finished third at the Monaco Grand Prix with teammate Leclerc securing race victory. However, a mid-season slump due to Ferrari's failed upgrades began at the Canadian Grand Prix after he spun into Alex Albon in a weather-affected Grand Prix. Sainz then finished a frustrating 6th at his home grand prix, then third at the Austrian Grand Prix by benefitting from Max Verstappen and Lando Norris' collision to get the final podium place. Sainz's next three races consisted of fifth at the British Grand Prix, sixth at the Hungarian Grand Prix and sixth at the Belgian Grand Prix meaning at the summer break Sainz sat fifth in the championship with 162 points.

Upon return from the mid-season break, Sainz finished fifth in Zandvoort, and fourth in Monza as he helped teammate Leclerc to a Ferrari home victory. The Azerbaijan Grand Prix saw Sainz challenge Sergio Pérez for the podium, though their battle resulted in both drivers crashing into the wall on the back straight.

However, following 7th in Singapore, Sainz scored a second-place at the United States Grand Prix and won the Mexico City Grand Prix from pole position in an upturn in form. However, he crashed out of the rain-affected São Paulo Grand Prix. He recorded a third-place at the Las Vegas Grand Prix and sixth in Qatar despite suffering damage on his car. At the season-ending Abu Dhabi Grand Prix, he finished on the podium in second to clinch fifth-place in the championship on a career-best 290 points.

Sainz left Ferrari after the 2024 season and was replaced by Lewis Hamilton for 2025. After his departure, Ferrari rewarded him with his race-winning F1-75 chassis from 2022.

=== Williams (2025–present) ===
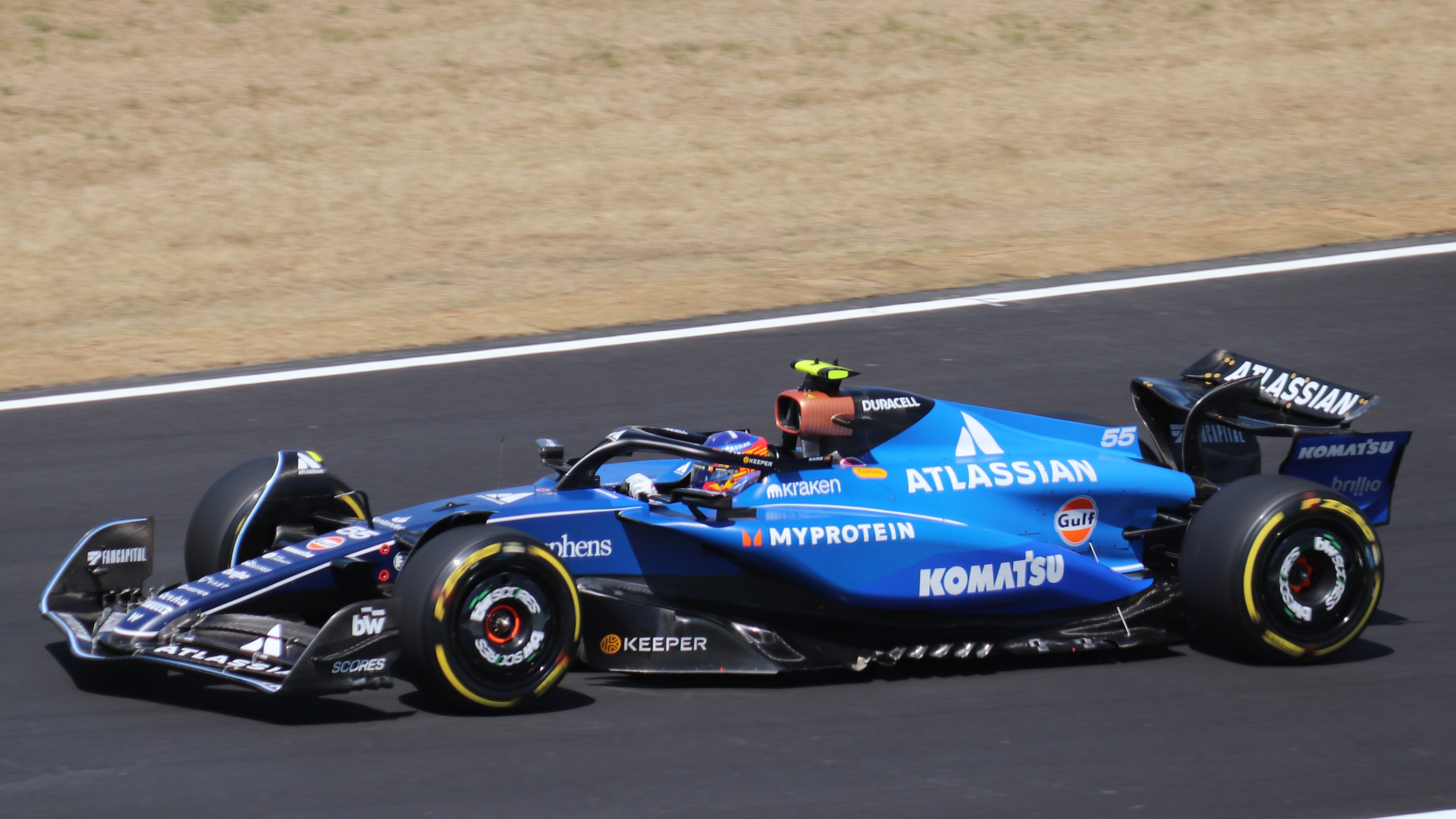
Sainz at the 2025 Japanese Grand Prix

==== 2025: Debut season with Williams ====
Replaced by Lewis Hamilton at Ferrari, Sainz joined Williams from 2025 onwards on a two-year deal, partnered by Alexander Albon. He crashed on the first lap of the rain-affected Australian Grand Prix under safety car conditions. In China, Sainz finished seventeenth in the sprint and tenth in the main race after disqualifications for Charles Leclerc, Lewis Hamilton, and Pierre Gasly. He finished outside of the points at the Japanese Grand Prix, having accrued a grid penalty for impeding Hamilton in qualifying and a €20,000 fine for missing the national anthem due to illness. Sainz started eighth in Bahrain, engaging in close battles with Yuki Tsunoda and Andrea Kimi Antonelli; he sustained race-ending sidepod damage with the former and received a penalty for forcing the latter off-track. At the Saudi Arabian Grand Prix, he qualified sixth and finished eighth. Sainz obtained his first podium with Williams at the Azerbaijan Grand Prix, qualifying second and finishing third, marking a season best performance. He joined Alain Prost as only the second driver ever to win podiums for all three of the Ferrari, McLaren, and Williams teams. Sainz would later score his second podium for Williams at the Qatar Grand Prix, that helped him secure ninth in the drivers' championship, just nine points behind teammate Albon who outqualified Sainz 8 times this season.

==== 2026 ====
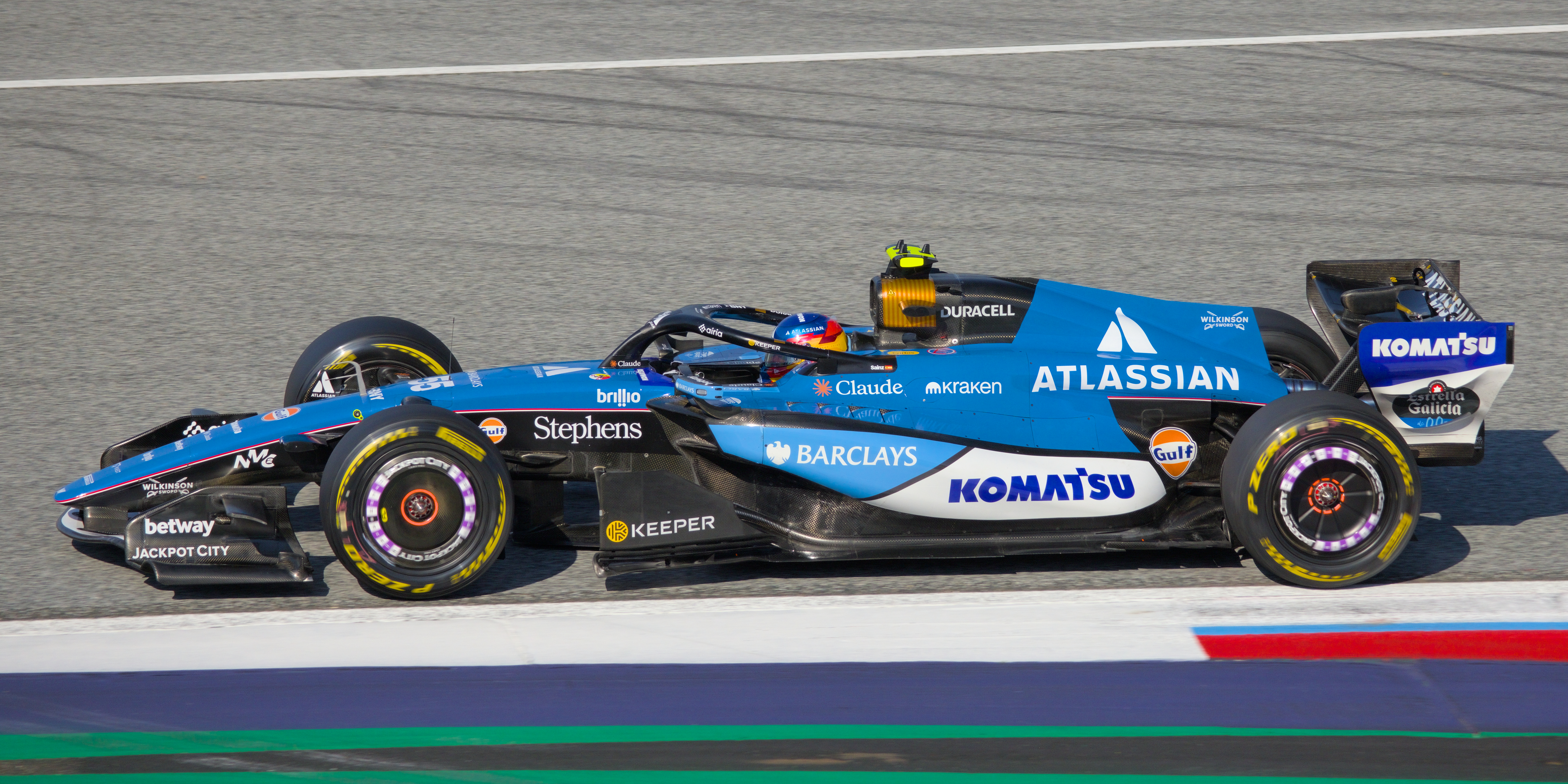
Sainz at the 2026 Austrian Grand Prix

Sainz remained with Williams for 2026, which saw the introduction of new regulations. The Williams FW48 was an immediate step back from its predecessor; he scored his first points of the season in China. Two consecutive points finishes followed in Miami and Canada. He retired in Monaco during the safety car restart, and again in Austria with an electrical issue. In Hungary, Sainz made contact with Oscar Piastri while being lapped, causing Piastri to lose time. Sainz received a five second penalty for the incident.

==== 2027 ====
On 19 August 2026, it was announced that Sainz signed a multi-year contract with Williams.

== Other ventures ==
In February 2025, Sainz was appointed as a director of the Grand Prix Drivers' Association (GPDA), the Formula One drivers' trade union. He replaced Sebastian Vettel, who retired from Formula One at the end of 2022. As a director, Sainz's primary role is to relay the paddock's concerns about safety, racing quality, and the junior driver pipeline to the GPDA's full-time personnel.

Sainz owns a hamburger restaurant in Madrid named Boogie Burger which he started in June 2023 with a group of friends.

== Personal life ==
Sainz was in a relationship with fellow Spaniard Isabel Hernáez from 2017 until 2023. He is dating Scottish model Rebecca Donaldson since mid 2023.

Sainz has lived in both Madrid and in London. He also maintains a residence in Monaco. Sainz was robbed of his watch, a Richard Mille worth a reported €315,000, in Milan in 2023 but he ran and captured his assailant.

Sainz's personal car collection includes several Ferraris: the F8 Tributo, 812 Competizione, and Daytona SP3.

== Karting record ==
=== Karting career summary ===
Season	Series	Team	Position
2006	Torneo Industrie — Minikart		3rd
2006	Copa de Campeones — Cadet		2nd
2007	Spanish Championship — KF3		11th
2007	Torneo Industrie — KF3		12th
2007	Copa de Campeones — KF3		6th
2007	CIK-FIA Asia-Pacific Championship — KF3		3rd
2008	South Garda Winter Cup — KF3		NC
2008	Andrea Margutti Trophy — KF3		7th
2008	CIK-FIA European Championship — KF3		NC
2008	WSK International Series — KF3		16th
2008	Monaco Kart Cup — KF3	Genikart-LTP	12th
2008	CIK-FIA Asia-Pacific Championship — KF3	Genikart-LTP	1st
2009	South Garda Winter Cup — KF3	Tony Kart Junior Racing Team	5th
2009	Andrea Margutti Trophy — KF3	Genikart-LTP	7th
2009	Spanish Championship — KF3		2nd
2009	German Karting Championship — Junior	KSM Racing Team	12th
2009	CIK-FIA European Championship — KF3	Tony Kart Junior Racing Team	2nd
2009	CIK-FIA World Cup — KF3	Tony Kart Junior Racing Team	24th
2009	WSK International Series — KF3	Tony Kart Junior Racing Team	3rd
2009	Monaco Kart Cup — KF3	Genikart-LTP	1st

== Racing record ==
=== Racing career summary ===
Season	Series	Team	Races	Wins	Poles	F/Laps	Podiums	Points	Position
2010	Formula BMW Europe	EuroInternational	16	1	2	2	5	227	4th
2010	Formula BMW Pacific	EuroInternational	9	2	3	2	5	N/A	NC†
2010	Eurocup Formula Renault 2.0	Epsilon Euskadi	2	0	0	2	1	N/A	NC†
2010	Eurocup Formula Renault 2.0	Tech 1 Racing	2	0	0	0	0	N/A	NC†
2010	European F3 Open	De Villota Motorsport	4	0	0	0	1	N/A	NC†
2010	Formula Renault UK Winter Series	Koiranen Bros. Motorsport	2	0	0	0	0	18	18th
2011	Eurocup Formula Renault 2.0	Koiranen Motorsport	14	2	4	5	10	200	**2nd**
2011	Formula Renault 2.0 NEC	Koiranen Motorsport	20	10	8	12	17	489	**1st**
2011	Formula 3 Euro Series	Signature	3	0	0	0	0	N/A	NC†
2011	Macau Grand Prix	Signature	1	0	0	0	0	N/A	17th
2012	British Formula 3 Championship	Carlin	26	4	1	2	9	224	6th
2012	Formula 3 Euro Series	Carlin	24	0	2	0	2	112	9th
2012	FIA Formula 3 European Championship	Carlin	20	1	2	1	5	161	5th
2012	Masters of Formula 3	Carlin	1	0	0	0	0	N/A	4th
2012	Macau Grand Prix	Carlin	1	0	0	0	0	N/A	7th
2013	GP3 Series	MW Arden	16	0	1	2	2	66	10th
2013	Formula Renault 3.5 Series	Zeta Corse	9	0	0	1	0	22	19th
2013	Macau Grand Prix	Carlin	1	0	0	0	0	N/A	7th
2013	Formula One	Red Bull Racing	Test driver						
2013	Formula One	Scuderia Toro Rosso	Test driver						
2014	Formula Renault 3.5 Series	DAMS	17	7	7	6	7	227	**1st**
2015	Formula One	Scuderia Toro Rosso	19	0	0	0	0	18	15th
2016	Formula One	Scuderia Toro Rosso	21	0	0	0	0	46	12th
2017	Formula One	Scuderia Toro Rosso	16	0	0	0	0	54	9th
2017	Formula One	Renault Sport F1 Team	4	0	0	0	0	54	9th
2018	Formula One	Renault Sport F1 Team	21	0	0	0	0	53	10th
2019	Formula One	McLaren F1 Team	21	0	0	0	1	96	6th
2020	Formula One	McLaren F1 Team	17	0	0	1	1	105	6th
2021	Formula One	Scuderia Ferrari Mission Winnow	22	0	0	0	4	164.5	5th
2022	Formula One	Scuderia Ferrari	22	1	3	2	9	246	5th
2023	Formula One	Scuderia Ferrari	22	1	2	0	3	200	7th
2024	Formula One	Scuderia Ferrari	24	2	1	1	9	290	5th
2025	Formula One	Atlassian Williams Racing	24	0	0	0	2	64	9th
2026	Formula One	Atlassian Williams F1 Team	20	0	0	0	0	7*	18th*

^{†} As Sainz was a guest driver, he was ineligible for points.
* Season still in progress.

=== Complete Formula BMW Europe results ===
(key) (Races in bold indicate pole position; races in italics indicate fastest lap)

Year	Entrant	1	2	3	4	5	6	7	8	9	10	11	12	13	14	15	16	D.C.	Points
2010	EuroInternational	CAT; 1; 3	CAT; 2; 6	ZAN; 1; 5	ZAN; 2; 2	VAL; 1; 7	VAL; 2; 10	**SIL**; **1**; 3	**SIL**; **2**; 1	HOC; 1; 11	HOC; 2; 6	HUN; 1; 4	HUN; 2; 3	SPA; 1 Ret	SPA; 2 Ret	MNZ; 1; 8	MNZ; 2; 6	4th	227

=== Complete Eurocup Formula Renault 2.0 results ===
(key) (Races in bold indicate pole position; races in italics indicate fastest lap)

Year	Entrant	1	2	3	4	5	6	7	8	9	10	11	12	13	14	15	16	D.C.	Points
2010	Epsilon Euskadi	ALC	ALC	SPA	SPA	BRN	BRN	MAG	MAG	HUN	HUN	HOC	HOC	SIL; 1; 3	SIL; 2; 18			NC	0
2010	Tech 1 Racing															CAT; 1 Ret	CAT; 2; 5	NC	0
2011	Koiranen GP	ALC; 1; 1	ALC; 2; 2	SPA; 1; 1	**SPA**; **2**; 3	NÜR; 1; 2	NÜR; 2; 2	HUN; 1; 8	HUN; 2; 14	**SIL**; **1**; 27	SIL; 2; 6	LEC; 1; 3	**LEC**; **2**; 2	**CAT**; **1**; 2	CAT; 2; 2			2nd	200

=== Complete Formula Renault 2.0 Northern European Cup results ===
(key) (Races in bold indicate pole position; races in italics indicate fastest lap)

Year	Entrant	1	2	3	4	5	6	7	8	9	10	11	12	13	14	15	16	17	18	19	20	D.C.	Points
2011	Koiranen GP	**HOC**; **1**; 3	**HOC**; **2**; 1	HOC; 3; 1	SPA; 1; 1	**SPA**; **2**; 3	**NÜR**; **1**; 1	NÜR; 2; 1	**ASS**; **1**; 1	ASS; 2; 8	ASS; 3; 2	OSC; 1; 3	OSC; 2; 1	**ZAN**; **1**; 1	**ZAN**; **2**; 1	MST; 1; 2	**MST**; **2**; 1	MST; 3; 2	MNZ; 1; 18	MNZ; 2; 2	MNZ; 3; 8	1st	489

=== Complete Formula 3 Euro Series results ===
(key) (Races in bold indicate pole position; races in italics indicate fastest lap)

Year	Entrant	Engine	1	2	3	4	5	6	7	8	9	10	11	12	13	14	15	16	17	18	19	20	21	22	23	24	25	26	27	D.C.	Points
2011	Signatech	Volkswagen	LEC; 1	LEC; 2	LEC; 3	HOC; 1	HOC; 2	HOC; 3	ZAN; 1	ZAN; 2	ZAN; 3	RBR; 1	RBR; 2	RBR; 3	NOR; 1	NOR; 2	NOR; 3	NÜR; 1	NÜR; 2	NÜR; 3	SIL; 1	SIL; 2	SIL; 3	VAL; 1	VAL; 2	VAL; 3	HOC; 1 Ret	HOC; 2 Ret	HOC; 3; 5	NC*	N/A
2012	Carlin	Volkswagen	**HOC**; **1**; 2	HOC; 2; 5	**HOC**; **3**; 2	BRH; 1; 4	BRH; 2; 6	BRH; 3; 4	RBR; 1; 16†	RBR; 2; 7	RBR; 3; 5	NOR; 1 Ret	NOR; 2; 25†	NOR; 3; 19	NÜR; 1; 7	NÜR; 2; 15	NÜR; 3; 10	ZAN; 1; 11	ZAN; 2; 9	ZAN; 3; 5	VAL; 1 Ret	VAL; 2; 10	VAL; 3; 6	HOC; 1 Ret	HOC; 2; 13	HOC; 3; 11				9th	112

^{†} Driver did not finish the race but was classified as he completed over 90% of the race distance.

=== Complete British Formula Three Championship results ===
(key) (Races in bold indicate pole position; races in italics indicate fastest lap)

Year	Entrant	Chassis	Engine	1	2	3	4	5	6	7	8	9	10	11	12	13	14	15	16	17	18	19	20	21	22	23	24	25	26	27	28	29	D.C.	Points
2012	Carlin	Dallara F312	Volkswagen	OUL; 1; 3	OUL; 2; 5	OUL; 3; 4	MNZ; 1; 1	MNZ; 2; 8	**MNZ**; **3**; 1	PAU; 1; 6	PAU; 2; 2	ROC; 1; 10	ROC; 2; 12	ROC; 3; 3	BRH; 1; 4	BRH; 2; 4	BRH; 3 Ret	NOR; 1 Ret	NOR; 2; 25	NOR; 3; 19	SPA; 1; 3	SPA; 2 C	SPA; 3; 1	SNE; 1 Ret	SNE; 2; 11	SNE; 3; 1	SIL; 1; 2	SIL; 2; 7	SIL; 3; 5	DON; 1	DON; 2	DON; 3	6th	224

=== Complete GP3 Series results ===
(key) (Races in bold indicate pole position; races in italics indicate fastest lap)

Year	Entrant	1	2	3	4	5	6	7	8	9	10	11	12	13	14	15	16	D.C.	Points
2013	MW Arden	CAT; FEA; 15	CAT; SPR; DSQ	VAL; FEA; 5	VAL; SPR; 3	SIL; FEA; 13	SIL; SPR; 13	NÜR; FEA; 6	NÜR; SPR; 5	HUN; FEA; 5	HUN; SPR; 2	**SPA**; **FEA**; Ret	SPA; SPR; 13	MNZ; FEA; 9	MNZ; SPR; 9	YMC; FEA; DSQ	YMC; SPR; 18	10th	66

=== Complete Formula Renault 3.5 Series results ===
(key) (Races in bold indicate pole position; races in italics indicate fastest lap)

Year	Team	1	2	3	4	5	6	7	8	9	10	11	12	13	14	15	16	17	Pos.	Points
2013	Zeta Corse	MNZ; 1	MNZ; 2	ALC; 1	ALC; 2	MON; 1; 6	SPA; 1 Ret	SPA; 2; 18†	MSC; 1	MSC; 2	RBR; 1	RBR; 2	HUN; 1; 7	HUN; 2; 22	LEC; 1; 16†	LEC; 2 Ret	CAT; 1 Ret	CAT; 2; 6	19th	22
2014	DAMS	**MNZ**; **1**; 18	**MNZ**; **2**; 1	**ALC**; **1**; 1	ALC; 2; 4	MON; 1; 4	**SPA**; **1**; 1	**SPA**; **2**; 1	MSC; 1; 14	MSC; 2; 6	**NÜR**; **1**; 1	NÜR; 2 Ret	HUN; 1; 4	HUN; 2; 6	**LEC**; **1**; 1	LEC; 2; 1	JER; 1; 15	JER; 2; 11	**1st**	**227**

^{†} Did not finish, but was classified as he had completed more than 90% of the race distance.

=== Complete Formula One results ===
(key) (Races in bold indicate pole position; races in italics indicates fastest lap)

Year	Entrant	Chassis	Engine	1	2	3	4	5	6	7	8	9	10	11	12	13	14	15	16	17	18	19	20	21	22	23	24	WDC	Points
2015	Scuderia Toro Rosso	Toro Rosso STR10	Renault Energy F1‑2015 1.6 V6 t	AUS; 9	MAL; 8	CHN; 13	BHR; Ret	ESP; 9	MON; 10	CAN; 12	AUT; Ret	GBR; Ret	HUN; Ret	BEL; Ret	ITA; 11	SIN; 9	JPN; 10	RUS; Ret	USA; 7	MEX; 13	BRA; Ret	ABU; 11						15th	18
2016	Scuderia Toro Rosso	Toro Rosso STR11	Ferrari 060 1.6 V6 t	AUS; 9	BHR; Ret	CHN; 9	RUS; 12	ESP; 6	MON; 8	CAN; 9	EUR; Ret	AUT; 8	GBR; 8	HUN; 8	GER; 14	BEL; Ret	ITA; 15	SIN; 14	MAL; 11	JPN; 17	USA; 6	MEX; 16	BRA; 6	ABU; Ret				12th	46
2017	Scuderia Toro Rosso	Toro Rosso STR12	Toro Rosso 1.6 V6 t	AUS; 8	CHN; 7	BHR; Ret	RUS; 10	ESP; 7	MON; 6	CAN; Ret	AZE; 8	AUT; Ret	GBR; Ret	HUN; 7	BEL; 10	ITA; 14	SIN; 4	MAL; Ret	JPN; Ret									9th	54
2017	Renault Sport F1 Team	Renault R.S.17	Renault R.E.17 1.6 V6 t																	USA; 7	MEX; Ret	BRA; 11	ABU; Ret					9th	54
2018	Renault Sport F1 Team	Renault R.S.18	Renault R.E.18 1.6 V6 t	AUS; 10	BHR; 11	CHN; 9	AZE; 5	ESP; 7	MON; 10	CAN; 8	FRA; 8	AUT; 12	GBR; Ret	GER; 12	HUN; 9	BEL; 11	ITA; 8	SIN; 8	RUS; 17	JPN; 10	USA; 7	MEX; Ret	BRA; 12	ABU; 6				10th	53
2019	McLaren F1 Team	McLaren MCL34	Renault E-Tech 19 1.6 V6 t	AUS; Ret	BHR; 19^{†}	CHN; 14	AZE; 7	ESP; 8	MON; 6	CAN; 11	FRA; 6	AUT; 8	GBR; 6	GER; 5	HUN; 5	BEL; Ret	ITA; Ret	SIN; 12	RUS; 6	JPN; 5	MEX; 13	USA; 8	BRA; 3	ABU; 10				6th	96
2020	McLaren F1 Team	McLaren MCL35	Renault E-Tech 20 1.6 V6 t	AUT; 5	STY; 9	HUN; 9	GBR; 13	70A; 13	ESP; 6	BEL; DNS	ITA; 2	TUS; Ret	RUS; Ret	EIF; 5	POR; 6	EMI; 7	TUR; 5	BHR; 5	SKH; 4	ABU; 6								6th	105
2021	Scuderia Ferrari Mission Winnow	Ferrari SF21	Ferrari 065/6 1.6 V6 t	BHR; 8	EMI; 5	POR; 11	ESP; 7	MON; 2	AZE; 8	FRA; 11	STY; 6	AUT; 5	GBR; 6	HUN; 3	BEL; 10‡	NED; 7	ITA; 6	RUS; 3	TUR; 8	USA; 7	MXC; 6	SAP; 6^{3}	QAT; 7	SAU; 8	ABU; 3			5th	164.5
2022	Scuderia Ferrari	Ferrari F1-75	Ferrari 066/7 1.6 V6 t	BHR; 2	SAU; 3	AUS; Ret	EMI; Ret^{4}	MIA; 3	ESP; 4	MON; 2	AZE; Ret	CAN; 2	**GBR**; 1	AUT; Ret^{3}	FRA; 5	HUN; 4	**BEL**; 3	NED; 8	ITA; 4	SIN; 3	JPN; Ret	**USA**; Ret	MXC; 5	SAP; 3^{2}	ABU; 4			5th	246
2023	Scuderia Ferrari	Ferrari SF-23	Ferrari 066/10 1.6 V6 t	BHR; 4	SAU; 6	AUS; 12	AZE; 5^{5}	MIA; 5	MON; 8	ESP; 5	CAN; 5	AUT; 6^{3}	GBR; 10	HUN; 8	BEL; Ret^{4}	NED; 5	**ITA**; 3	**SIN**; 1	JPN; 6	QAT; DNS^{6}	USA; 3^{6}	MXC; 4	SAP; 6^{8}	LVG; 6	ABU; 18†			7th	200
2024	Scuderia Ferrari	Ferrari SF-24	Ferrari 066/12 1.6 V6 t	BHR; 3	SAU; WD	AUS; 1	JPN; 3	CHN; 5^{5}	MIA; 5^{5}	EMI; 5	MON; 3	CAN; Ret	ESP; 6	AUT; 3^{5}	GBR; 5	HUN; 6	BEL; 6	NED; 5	ITA; 4	AZE; 18†	SIN; 7	USA; 2^{2}	**MXC**; 1	SAP; Ret^{5}	LVG; 3	QAT; 6^{4}	ABU; 2	5th	290
2025	Atlassian Williams Racing	Williams FW47	Mercedes-AMG F1 M16 V6 t	AUS; Ret	CHN; 10	JPN; 14	BHR; Ret	SAU; 8	MIA; 9	EMI; 8	MON; 10	ESP; 14	CAN; 10	AUT; DNS	GBR; 12	BEL; 18^{6}	HUN; 14	NED; 13	ITA; 11	AZE; 3	SIN; 10	USA; Ret^{3}	MXC; 17†	SAP; 13	LVG; 5	QAT; 3^{8}	ABU; 13	9th	64
2026	Atlassian Williams F1 Team	Williams FW48	Mercedes-AMG F1 M17 V6 t	AUS; 15	CHN; 9	JPN; 15	MIA; 9	CAN; 9	MON; 16†	BCN; 12	AUT; Ret	GBR; 17	BEL; 16	HUN; 18	NED; 16	ITA; 13	ESP; Ret	AZE; 10	BHR; 17	SIN; 14	USA; 18	MXC; 12	SAP; 19	LVG	QAT	ABU		18th*	7*

^{†} Did not finish, but was classified as he had completed more than 90% of the race distance.
^{‡} Half points awarded as less than 75% of race distance was completed.
* Season still in progress.

== Notes ==
Sporting positions
Preceded by Ludwig Ghidi	Formula Renault 2.0 NEC; Champion; 2011	Succeeded by Jake Dennis
Preceded by Kevin Magnussen	Formula Renault 3.5 Series; Champion; 2014	Succeeded by Oliver Rowland
