= Angelos Tsiaparas =

Greek Motorsports Engineer

- Education: National Technical University of Athens
- Occupation: Engineer
- Employer: Williams Racing
- Known for: Formula One engineer
- Title: Chief engineer

Angelos Tsiaparas (Greek: Άγγελος Τσιαπάρας) is a Greek Formula One and motorsports engineer. He is currently the Chief Engineer for the Williams Racing Formula One team.

== Career ==
Tsiaparas studied Mechanical Engineering at the National Technical University of Athens, where he completed a Master of Engineering Science (MSc) degree specialising in air and ground vehicles between 2009 and 2016. He began his motorsport career with Manor Racing in 2016 as a Design Engineer in the team's Advanced Projects Group, working on future car conceptual engineering, engineering analysis and suspension design. In 2017, Tsiaparas joined Red Bull Racing as a Design Engineer, contributing to future car conceptual design studies, suspension systems development, component analysis and research and development projects.

In 2022, he was promoted to Senior Design Engineer at Red Bull, focusing on suspension systems design and development, future car conceptual design and advanced R&D activities. Alongside his role at Red Bull, he also worked part-time as a Performance Engineer at Eurotech Racing Limited in 2018, supporting chassis parameter analysis, car set-up optimisation and suspension kinematics simulation.

Tsiaparas joined Williams Racing in 2023 as Head of Concept Design, where he led conceptual development for the team's Formula One cars. In July 2024, he was appointed Chief Engineer for the FW48 project, leading the cross-departmental development of Williams’ 2026 Formula One car.
