= Williams Racing =

British Formula One motor racing team and constructor

(United Kingdom) Atlassian Williams-Mercedes
- Full name: Atlassian Williams F1 Team
- Base: Grove, Oxfordshire, England
- Team principal(s): Matthew Savage (Chairman); James Vowles (Team Principal)
- Chief Technical Officer: Pat Fry
- Founder(s): Frank Williams; Patrick Head
- Website: williamsf1.com

2026 Formula One World Championship
- Race drivers: 23. (Thailand) Alexander Albon; 55. (Spain) Carlos Sainz Jr.
- Test driver(s): (United Kingdom) Luke Browning (France) Victor Martins
- Chassis: FW48
- Engine: Mercedes
- Tyres: Pirelli

Formula One World Championship career
- First entry: As a team 1977 Spanish Grand Prix; As a constructor 1978 Argentine Grand Prix
- Last entry: 2026 São Paulo Grand Prix
- Races entered: As a team: 882 entries (878 starts); As a constructor: 871 entries (870 starts)
- Engines: Ford, Honda, Judd, Renault, Mecachrome, Supertec, BMW, Cosworth, Toyota, Mercedes
- Constructors' Championships: 9 (1980, 1981, 1986, 1987, 1992, 1993, 1994, 1996, 1997)
- Drivers' Championships: 7 (1980, 1982, 1987, 1992, 1993, 1996, 1997)
- Race victories: 114
- Podiums: 315
- Points: 3780 (3786)
- Pole positions: 128
- Fastest laps: 134
- 2025 position: 5th (137 pts)

Williams Grand Prix Engineering Limited, competing in 2026 as Atlassian Williams F1 Team, is a British Formula One team and constructor. It was founded by Frank Williams and Patrick Head. The team was formed in 1977 after Frank Williams's earlier unsuccessful F1 operation, Frank Williams Racing Cars (which later became Wolf–Williams Racing in 1976). The team is based in Grove, Oxfordshire, on a 60-acre (24 ha) site.

The team's first race was the 1977 Spanish Grand Prix, where the new team ran a March chassis for Patrick Nève. Williams started manufacturing its own cars the following year, and Clay Regazzoni won Williams's first race at the 1979 British Grand Prix. At the 1997 British Grand Prix, Jacques Villeneuve scored the team's 100th race victory, making Williams one of only five teams in Formula One, alongside Ferrari, McLaren, Mercedes, and Red Bull Racing to win 100 races. Williams won nine Constructors' Championships between 1980 and 1997. This was a record until Ferrari won its tenth championship in 2000.

Notable drivers for Williams include: Alan Jones, Clay Regazzoni, Carlos Reutemann, Keke Rosberg, Nelson Piquet, Nigel Mansell, Riccardo Patrese, Thierry Boutsen, Damon Hill, Alain Prost, Ayrton Senna, David Coulthard, Jacques Villeneuve, Heinz-Harald Frentzen, Ralf Schumacher, Jenson Button, Juan Pablo Montoya, Mark Webber, Nick Heidfeld, Nico Rosberg, Pastor Maldonado, Valtteri Bottas, George Russell, Carlos Sainz Jr., Alex Albon and Felipe Massa.

Of these drivers, Jones, Keke Rosberg, Mansell, Hill, Piquet, Prost, and Villeneuve won the Drivers' title with the team. Of those who have won the championship with Williams, only Jones, Keke Rosberg and Villeneuve defended their title while still with the team; as Piquet moved to Lotus after winning the 1987 championship; Mansell left F1 to compete in the CART series after winning the 1992 championship, Prost retired after winning the 1993 championship, and Hill moved to Arrows after winning the 1996 championship. None of Williams's Drivers' Champions went on to win another championship after their success with Williams (although Mansell won the CART championship in his first season there).

Williams have worked with many engine manufacturers, most successfully with Renault, winning five of their nine Constructors' titles with the company. Along with Ferrari, McLaren, and Renault (formerly Benetton), Williams is one of a group of "Big Four" teams that won every Constructors' Championship between 1979 and 2008 and every Drivers' Championship from 1984 to 2008. Williams also has business interests beyond Formula One. They have established Williams Advanced Engineering and Williams Hybrid Power, who take technology originally developed for Formula One and adapt it for commercial applications. In April 2014, Williams Hybrid Power was sold to GKN. In August 2020, Williams was acquired by Dorilton Capital, and Frank and his daughter Claire Williams stepped down from the team's management.

== Origins ==
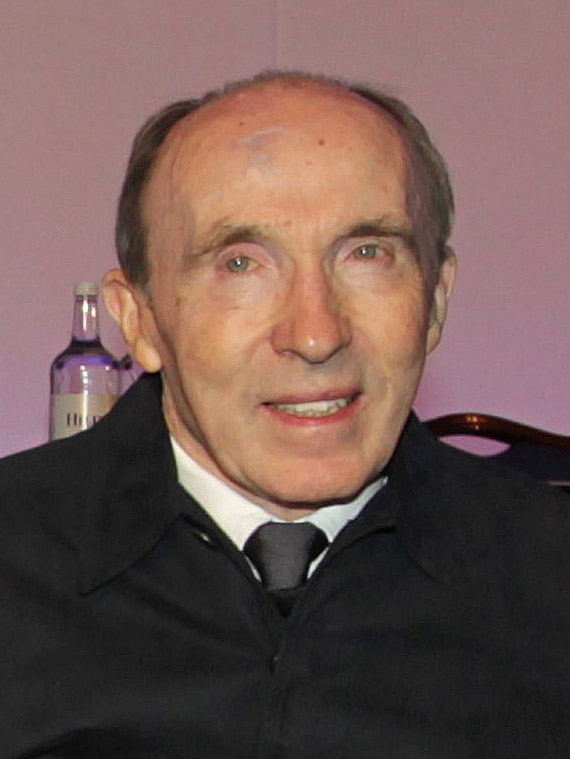
Frank Williams, founder of Williams Racing

Frank Williams founded Williams in 1977 after his previous team, Frank Williams Racing Cars, failed to achieve the success he desired. Despite the promise of a new owner, Canadian millionaire Walter Wolf, and the team's rebranding as Wolf–Williams Racing in 1976, the cars still were not competitive. Eventually, Williams left the rechristened Walter Wolf Racing and moved to Didcot, Oxfordshire to rebuild his team as Williams Grand Prix Engineering. Frank recruited Patrick Head to work for the team, creating the Williams–Head partnership.

== Racing history – Formula One ==
=== Ford-Cosworth engines (1977–1983) ===
The original Williams logo

==== 1977 season ====
Williams entered a March 761 for the 1977 season. Lone driver Patrick Nève competed in 11 races that year, starting with the Spanish Grand Prix. The new team failed to score a point, achieving a best finish of 7th at the Italian Grand Prix.

==== 1978 season ====
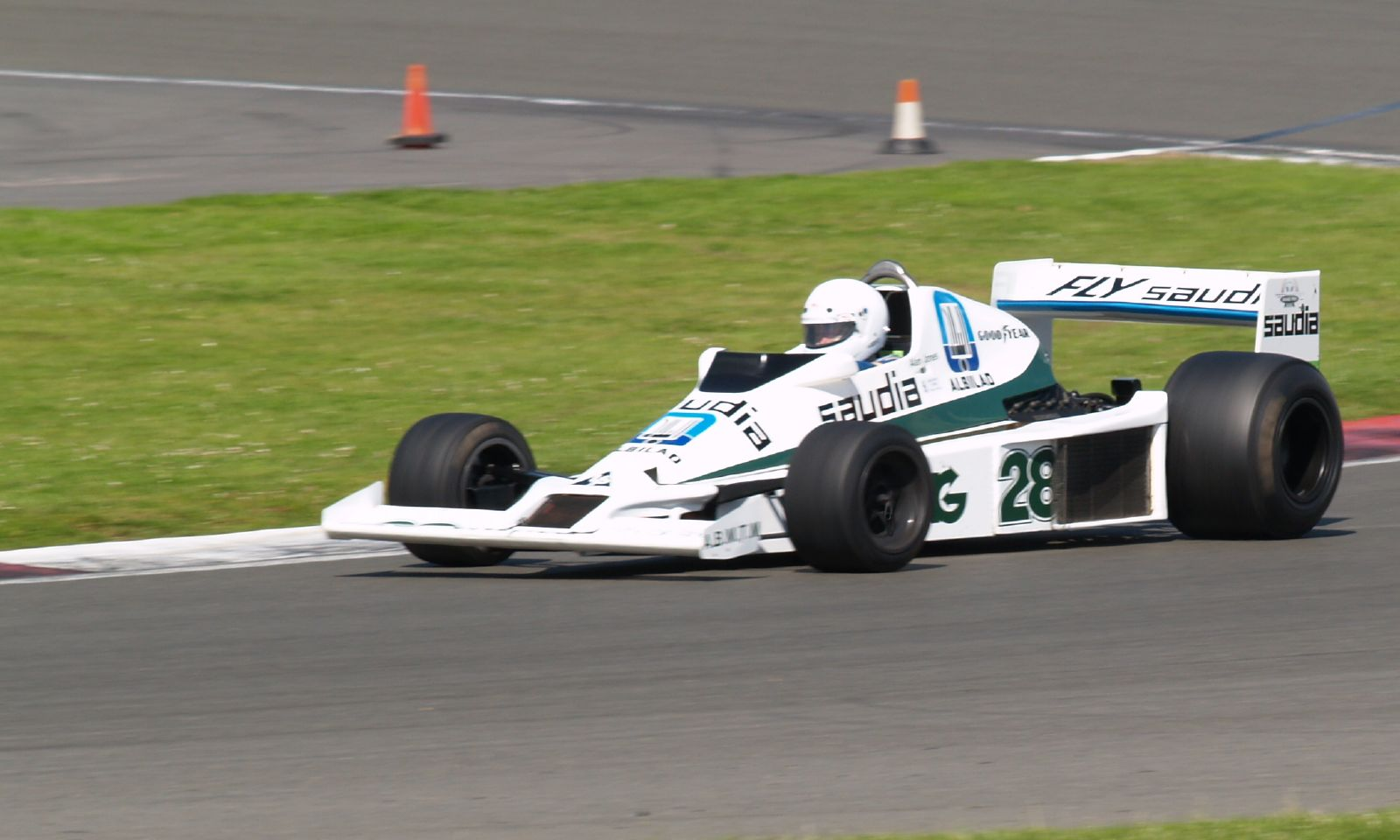
The 1978 Williams FW06 at Silverstone in 2007

For the 1978 season, Patrick Head designed the first Williams car: the FW06. Williams signed Alan Jones, who had won the Austrian Grand Prix the previous season for a devastated Shadow team following the death of their lead driver, Tom Pryce. Jones's first race for the team was the Argentine Grand Prix where he qualified in 14th position but retired after 36 laps due to a fuel system failure. The team scored its first championship points two races later at the South African Grand Prix when Jones finished in fourth. Williams earnt their first podium at the United States Grand Prix, where Jones came second, 20 seconds behind the Ferrari of Carlos Reutemann. Williams finished the season in ninth place in the Constructors' Championship, with a respectable 11 points, while Alan Jones finished 11th in the Drivers' Championship. Towards the end of 1978, Frank Williams recruited Frank Dernie to join Patrick Head in the design office.

==== 1979 season ====
Head designed the FW07 chassis and gearbox for the 1979 season with Frank Dernie picking up the suspension, aerodynamic development and skirt design. This was the team's first ground effect car, a technology that was first introduced by Colin Chapman and Team Lotus. Williams also obtained membership of the Formula One Constructors' Association (FOCA) which expressed a preference for teams to run two cars, so Jones was joined at the team by Clay Regazzoni. It was not until the seventh round of the championship, the Monaco Grand Prix, that they finished in the points. Regazzoni came close to taking the team's first win but finished second, less than a second behind race winner Jody Scheckter. The next race, the French Grand Prix, is remembered for the final lap battle between René Arnoux and Gilles Villeneuve, but also saw both cars finish in the points for the first time; as Jones was fourth with Regazzoni in sixth. The team's first win came at the British Grand Prix (their home Grand Prix) when Regazzoni finished 25 seconds ahead of second place.

Greater success followed when Williams got a 1-2 finish at the next round in Germany, Jones in first with Regazzoni two seconds behind in second. Jones then made it three wins in a row at the Austrian Grand Prix, finishing half a minute ahead of Gilles Villeneuve's Ferrari. Three wins in a row became four two weeks later at the Dutch Grand Prix, with Alan Jones winning yet again by a comfortable margin over Jody Scheckter's Ferrari. Scheckter ended Williams's winning streak when he won the Italian Grand Prix; with Regazzoni finishing third behind Scheckter and Villeneuve. Alan Jones managed another win at the penultimate race in Canada to cap off a great season.

Williams had greatly improved their Constructors' Championship position, finishing seven places higher than the previous year and scoring 59 more points. Alan Jones was the closest driver to the Ferrari duo of Villeneuve and 1979 champion Jody Scheckter. Jones scored 43 points, 17 points behind Scheckter, while Regazzoni was two places behind him with 32 points.

==== 1980 season ====
Before the start of the 1980 season, Regazzoni left the team and was replaced by Carlos Reutemann. Williams started strong in the championship, with Jones winning the first race of the season in Argentina. Jones won four more races: the French Grand Prix, the British Grand Prix, the Canadian Grand Prix and, the last race of the season, the United States Grand Prix. Jones became the first of seven Williams drivers to win the Drivers' Championship, 17 points ahead of Nelson Piquet's Brabham. Williams also won its first Constructors' Championship, scoring 120 points, almost twice as many as second-placed Ligier.

==== 1981 season ====
Williams won four races in 1981. Alan Jones won the first race of the season, the United States West Grand Prix, and the final race of the season, the Caesars Palace Grand Prix. Meanwhile, Carlos Reutemann won the Brazilian Grand Prix and the Belgian Grand Prix. Williams won the Constructors' title for the second year in a row, scoring 95 points, 34 points more than second-placed Brabham.

==== 1982 season ====
Keke Rosberg's FW08 used during the 1982 season when Rosberg won the Drivers' Championship recording only a single win during the season

This season, Alan Jones retired from Formula One (though he would come back a year later for a single race with the Arrows team). The Australian was replaced by Keke Rosberg, who had left Fittipaldi where he failed to score a point the previous season. He won the Drivers' title that year despite winning only one race, the Swiss Grand Prix. Rosberg's teammate, Reutemann, finished in 15th place having quit Formula One after just two races of the new season. His seat was filled by Mario Andretti for the United States Grand Prix West; before Derek Daly took over for the rest of the year. Williams finished fourth in the Constructors' Championship that year, 16 points behind first-place Ferrari.

=== Honda engines (1983–1987) ===
==== 1983 season ====
Frank Williams looked towards Honda, who was developing a turbocharged V6 engine with Spirit. A deal between Honda and Williams was settled early in 1983, with the team set to begin using the engines in 1984. Keke Rosberg won at Monaco Grand Prix, marking Williams' last victory with Ford. The team debuted its Honda engine at the series finale in South Africa, with Rosberg running fifth.

Rosberg was unable to defend his championship, which was won by Nelson Piquet for Brabham, and finished in fifth with 29 points. Williams signed Jacques Lafitte, who had previously raced for Frank Williams' original team, away from Ligier to replace Derek Daly. Laffite finished eleventh in the points with a best finish of fourth, achieved twice at Brazil and Long Beach. Because they did not contest the entire season with one manufacturer, Williams made two entries in the constructor's standings. The Fords garnered a total of 36 points, leaving the team a distant fourth behind champion Ferrari, Renault, and Brabham; the two points Rosberg earned in the Honda at South Africa was enough to place it eleventh in the constructor's standings, just ahead of Theodore and Lotus, which each garnered one point.

==== 1984 season ====
For the 1984 season, the team ran an FW09. Keke Rosberg won the Dallas Grand Prix and finished in second at the opening race in Brazil, coming in eighth in the championship as Lafitte came in fourteenth with five total points and a best finish of fourth in Dallas. Williams again struggled in the constructor's championship, finishing with 25.5 points to place them sixth, 8.5 behind fifth place Renault. This was the last year that Williams raced with backing from Saudia Airlines.

==== 1985 season ====
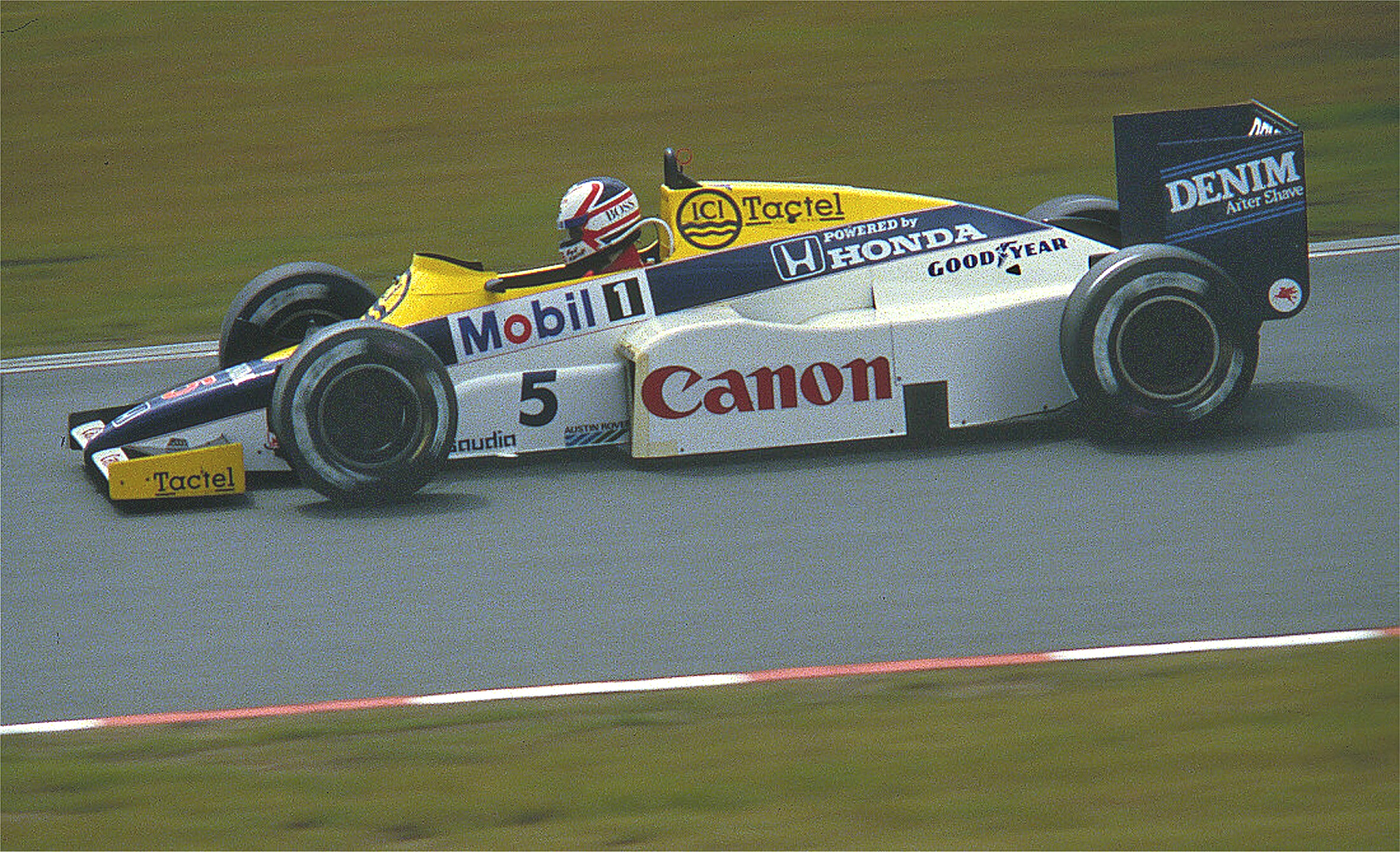
Nigel Mansell's Williams FW10 chassis used during the 1985 season

In 1985, Head designed the FW10, the team's first chassis to employ the carbon-fibre composite technology pioneered by McLaren. Nigel Mansell, who was pushed out of his ride at Lotus after they were able to convince Ayrton Senna to leave Toleman after his rookie year, joined the team to partner with Rosberg after Lafitte chose to return to Ligier after two seasons with Williams. Dernie produced another competitive aerodynamic package. The team scored four wins with Rosberg winning the Detroit and Australian Grands Prix, and Mansell won the European Grand Prix and the South African Grand Prix. Williams finished in third in the Constructors' Championship, scoring 71 points.

During qualifying for the British Grand Prix, Rosberg completed a lap of the circuit in 1:05.591. The lap's average speed was 160.938 mph (259.005 km/h). This was the fastest recorded lap in Formula One history to that point.

1985 was the first year of Williams' long term relationship with Canon Inc. as its backer; the relationship would continue for nine seasons.

==== 1986 season ====
In March 1986, Frank Williams faced the most serious challenge of his life. While returning to the airport at Nice, France, after pre-season testing, he was involved in a road accident that left him paralysed. He did not return to the pit lane for almost a year.

Williams again found itself with a new driver for one of its Hondas as former world champion Keke Rosberg left to replace the retiring Niki Lauda at McLaren alongside defending world champion Alain Prost. Nelson Piquet, who was two years removed from his world championship with Brabham, came aboard to partner with a returning Nigel Mansell.

Despite the lack of Frank Williams' trackside presence, the team had one of its best seasons to date. Piquet won four times and Mansell five, propelling Williams to an easy constructors' championship win dethroning McLaren. Piquet and Mansell were two of three drivers that year to win at least four Grands Prix, with Prost being the other.

The driver's championship came down to the Australian Grand Prix at the end of the season. Both Mansell, the points leader, and Piquet had the chance to leave the circuit as world champion. If Mansell finished in fourth or higher, he would clinch the championship no matter what. Piquet's path was slightly more complicated. Entering the weekend, he was tied with Prost for second in the points, eight behind Mansell; if Mansell finished fifth or worse, Piquet would take the championship with a victory. Prost, meanwhile, would need to win and have Mansell finish sixth or worse as the first tiebreaker, wins, would go to Mansell as he had recorded two more victories to that point than Prost.

Running in third with nineteen laps left to be run, Mansell suffered a tyre failure on the main straight and was forced to retire. This left Piquet with an opportunity to win the championship as he was leading, but out of concern that he might also suffer the same fate, he was called into the pits. Prost took what would prove to be an insurmountable lead, winning the race and finishing with two more points than Mansell. Piquet finished in second place and third in the final standings, one point behind his teammate.

==== 1987 season ====
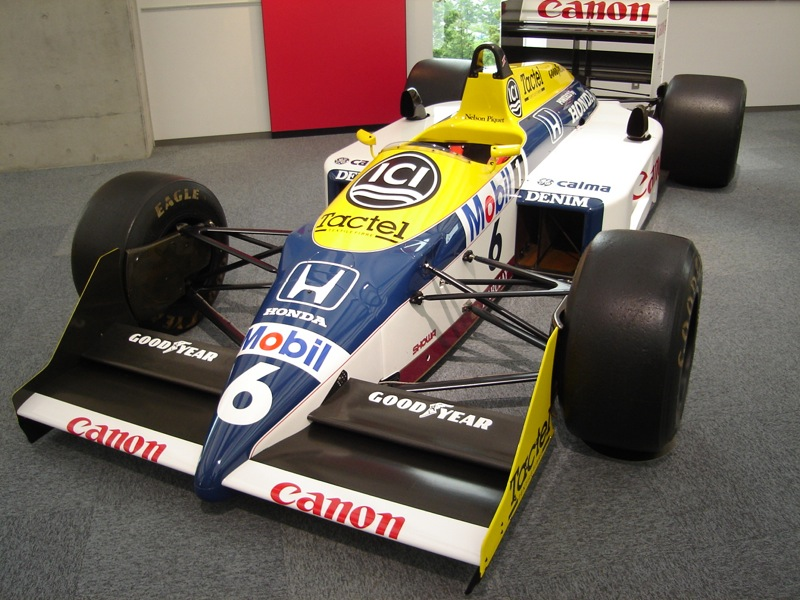
Nelson Piquet's championship-winning FW11B from 1987 was the only Honda-powered Williams to win a Drivers' Championship.

The 1987 season brought the Williams-Honda partnership its first and only Drivers' Championship title in the hands of Nelson Piquet. Piquet won three races and scored 73 points in the Drivers' Championship. His teammate Mansell came in second place with six victories, but missed the final two races due to an injury suffered in Japan in the penultimate race. Williams won the Constructors' Championship for the second year in a row, scoring 137 points, 61 points ahead of their nearest rivals, McLaren. Despite this success, Honda ended their partnership with Williams at the end of the year.

=== Judd engines (1988) ===
==== 1988 season ====
Unable to make a deal with another major engine manufacturer, Williams used naturally aspirated Judd engines for the 1988 season. This left them with a significant performance deficit compared with their turbo-powered rivals. Piquet left Williams to join Lotus to replace Ayrton Senna. Senna, meanwhile, was headed to McLaren to replace Stefan Johansson alongside Alain Prost. In addition, McLaren replaced its TAG-branded Porsche engines that had taken them to multiple world championships with the same Honda works engines Williams had been receiving. Furthermore, Piquet convinced Frank Dernie to join him at Lotus, which was also running Honda engines.

Williams brought in Riccardo Patrese from Brabham to replace Piquet. The team did not win a race that season and finished seventh in the Constructors' Championship, scoring 20 points. The highlights of the season for the team were two second-place finishes by Mansell. When Mansell was forced to miss two races due to illness, he was replaced by Martin Brundle for Belgium and Jean-Louis Schlesser for Italy. Schlesser's collision with Senna in that race would deny McLaren a clean sweep of race wins that season.

=== Renault engines (1989–1997) ===
The team secured Renault as their engine supplier in 1989. Renault engines subsequently powered Williams's drivers to another four Drivers' and five Constructors' Championships up until Renault's departure from Formula One at the end of 1997. The team brought in Adrian Newey to replace Frank Dernie. The combination of Renault's powerful engine and Adrian Newey's designing expertise led to the team dominating the sport in the mid-1990s alongside McLaren. Mansell had a record-breaking 1992 season, winning the title in record time and leading numerous races from pole to finish.

==== 1989 season ====
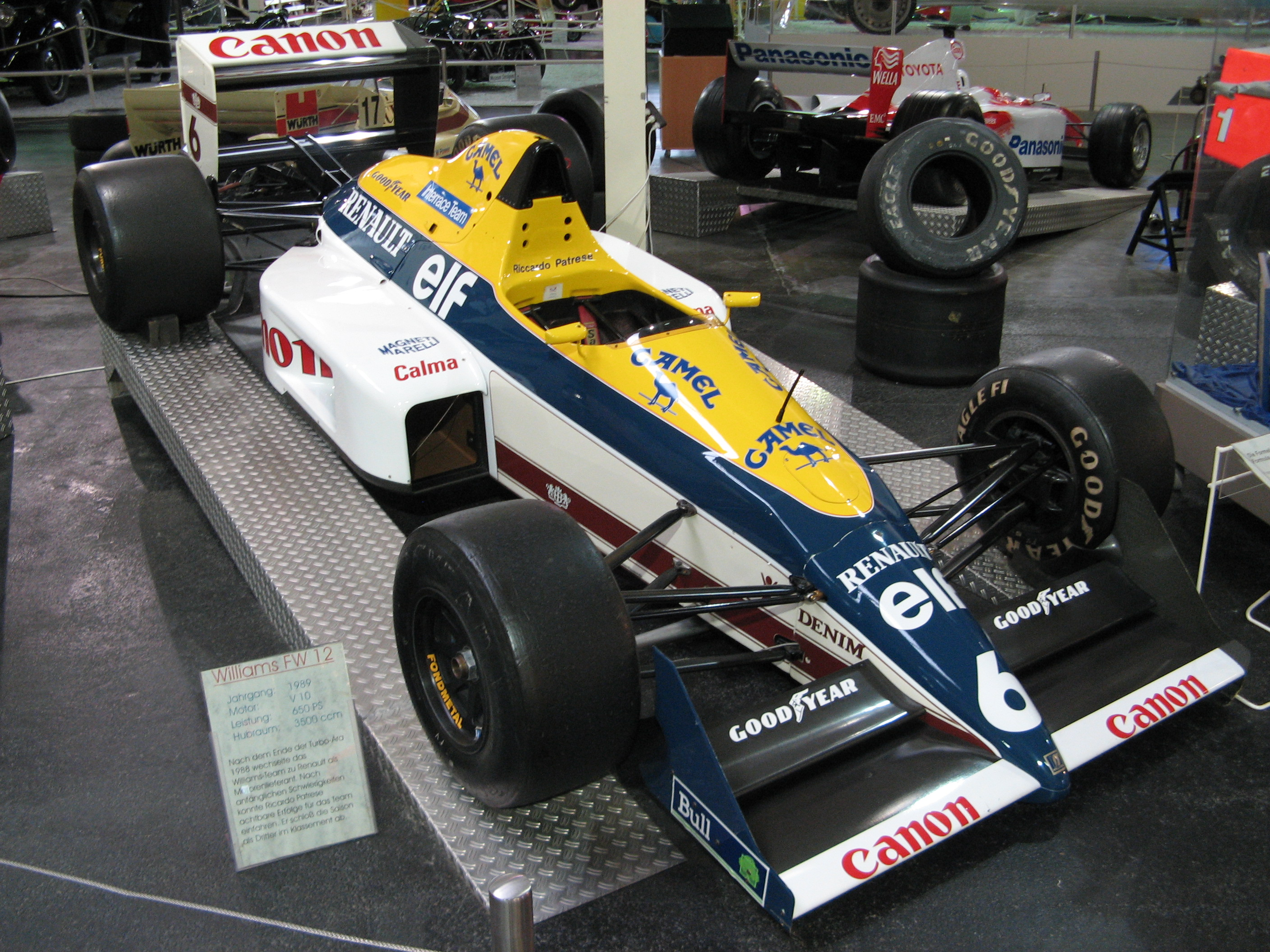
Williams FW12C, the first powered by a Renault engine

The Renault era started in 1989, with the team signing Thierry Boutsen away from Benetton to pair with a returning Patrese as Mansell left to join Ferrari. The engine's first Grand Prix in Brazil was one that the team would prefer to forget: Boutsen retired with an engine failure and Patrese with an alternator failure. Williams managed to get back on track with Boutsen finishing in fourth at the next race in Italy; winning the team three points. Two races later at the Mexican Grand Prix, the team managed to achieve their first podium with the Renault engine, as Patrese finished second, 15 seconds behind Ayrton Senna in first. The next race saw Patrese finish second again, having started from 14th on the grid, with Boutsen finishing in 6th. At the sixth round in Canada, Williams not only scored their first win with the Renault engine but also their first one-two: with Boutsen finishing in first followed by Patrese in second. This won the team 15 points. Williams came second in the Constructors' Championship, scoring 77 points, 64 points behind McLaren. Patrese finished 3rd in the Drivers' Championship with 40 points, 41 points behind first-placed Alain Prost. Boutsen finished 5th in the championship with 37 points after also winning in Australia. Boutsen's win gave Williams the distinction of having won both the first and last Grand Prix of the 1980s.

==== 1990 season ====
In the 1990 season, Williams kept Patrese and Boutsen as the team's drivers. The team scored 20 fewer points than the previous year and finished fourth in the Constructors' Championship two positions lower than in 1989. In the Drivers' Championship, Boutsen finished sixth with 34 points and Patrese in seventh with 23 points. After the season, Boutsen left to drive for Ligier.

==== 1991 season ====
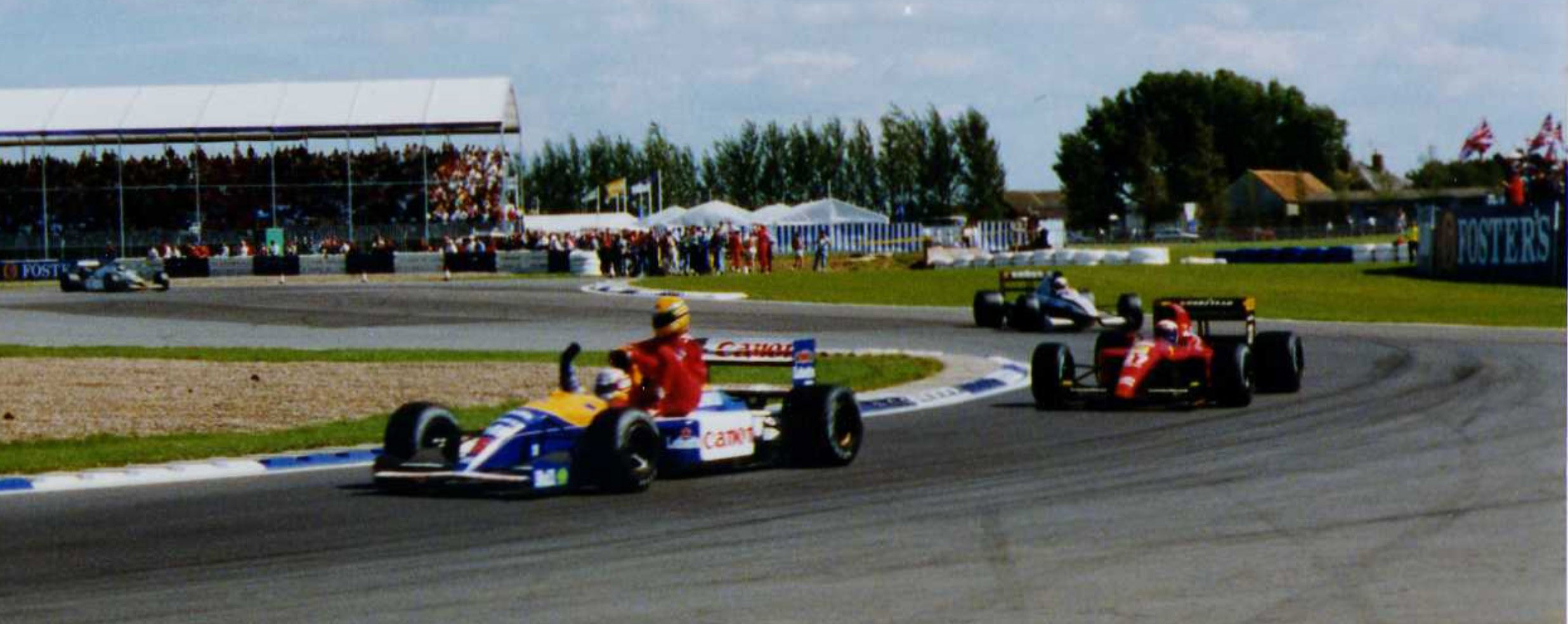
1991 British Grand Prix winner Nigel Mansell giving Ayrton Senna a lift back to the Silverstone paddock after Senna had run out of fuel

For 1991, Williams looked to a familiar face to fill the seat left by Boutsen. In fact, they were able to fill it with the man that Boutsen had been brought in to replace. After being personally selected by Enzo Ferrari to drive for the Italian team, and becoming the last driver to receive such an honor, Nigel Mansell's term at Ferrari had not gone particularly as well as he had hoped. After recording two wins in his first campaign, Mansell was paired alongside Alain Prost for 1990 after he had left his world championship winning ride at McLaren. Prost was immediately given the position of lead driver, which infuriated Mansell, and he had decided to retire from the sport altogether at the end of the season. Frank Williams appealed to Mansell to reconsider, and Mansell agreed to return to pilot one of the two Williams-Renaults. Patrese was retained to drive the other, and Damon Hill joined the team as its test driver.

Williams failed to finish the first Grand Prix of the season, the US Grand Prix, with both drivers retiring due to gearbox problems. Patrese got back on track for the team in the next Grand Prix at Interlagos, coming second behind McLaren's Ayrton Senna. The 1991 San Marino Grand Prix saw both cars retiring yet again: with Mansell crashing and Patrese suffering from an electrical failure. The Monaco Grand Prix saw Mansell finish in the points, coming in second. At the next race, the Canadian Grand Prix, Williams locked out the front row only for Patrese to drop back with gearbox problems and Mansell to retire from the lead on the final lap due to an electrical fault. At the following race in Mexico, Williams achieved a 1–2 finish, with Patrese finishing in first and Mansell finishing in second. Williams then ran a streak of victories, with Mansell winning the French Grand Prix, five seconds ahead of Prost's Ferrari. Mansell then won again at the British Grand Prix; it had been four years since a Briton had won the Grand Prix, Mansell having won it in 1987. Three consecutive victories became four when Mansell won again in Germany, with Patrese about 10 seconds behind him in second place. Senna ended Williams's run of victories by winning in Hungary, finishing five seconds ahead of Mansell. Mansell later won the Italian Grand Prix and the Spanish Grand Prix, while Patrese won the Portuguese Grand Prix after Mansell's race was ruined by a botched pitstop in which only three wheel nuts were fitted. Williams finished second in the Constructors' Championship, scoring 125 points in total, 14 points behind McLaren. Mansell finished second in the Drivers' Championship with 72 points, 24 points behind Senna.

==== 1992 season ====
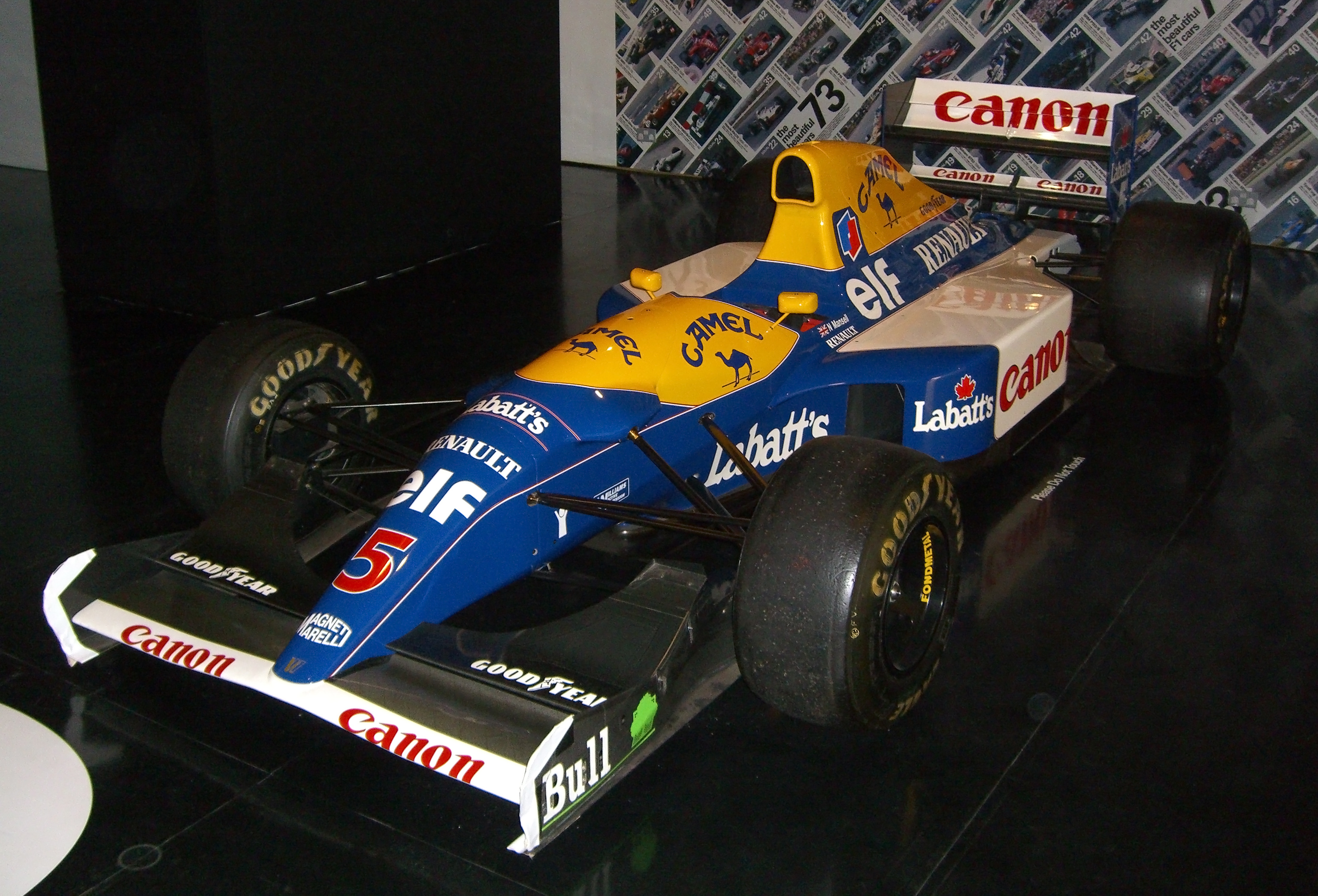
Nigel Mansell's Williams FW14B used for the 1992 season when he won the Drivers' Championship and the team won the Constructors' Championship

Williams took a step up for the 1992 season, keeping their 1991 driver line-up of Patrese and Mansell. Mansell dominated the first round in South Africa, qualifying in pole position and winning the race by 24 seconds from his teammate, Patrese. Nigel Mansell won the next four rounds for Williams, at Mexico City, Interlagos, Catalunya and Imola, Patrese coming second in all but one (the Spanish Grand Prix at Catalunya, where he retired after spinning off). Mansell's five victories in the opening five races was a new record in Formula One. Senna won the next race in Monaco, ahead of both Williams cars, which finished second and third. In the next race, in Canada, both Williams cars retired: Mansell spun off on entering the final corner (he claimed that Senna pushed him off) and Patrese had a gearbox failure. Mansell went on to record four more Grand Prix wins, including at the British Grand Prix. (In the final round, in Adelaide, the two Williams cars again retired, Mansell after Senna violently crashed into the back of him, and Patrese with electrical problems.) Williams won the Constructors' Championship with 164 points, 65 points more than second-place McLaren. Mansell became World Champion, scoring 108 points, with Patrese finishing second with 56 points. Placing first in nine races, Mansell had set a new record for the most wins by a single driver in one year. Despite this, there looked to be significant upheaval at Williams for 1993; what followed led to a domino effect that had not only effects on the World Championship, but also the CART-sanctioned PPG IndyCar Series.

===== 1992 off-season =====
Perhaps the hottest free agent on the drivers' market for 1993 was the former world champion Alain Prost. After being sacked by Ferrari during the 1991 campaign, Prost took a sabbatical and did not race in 1992 at all. Now that he was looking to return to F1, Williams was looking to bring him in to drive one of its two Renault-powered cars. Although he had been driving for the team since 1987, Riccardo Patrese figured that he would have likely been the one driver sacked to make room for Prost at Williams, seeing as Mansell had just won the world championship. He decided to make a preemptive move and join Benetton, where he would replace Martin Brundle alongside Michael Schumacher in the team's Camel-backed Fords.

Mansell, meanwhile, was not pleased with the idea of having Prost at Williams after all that had happened between the two drivers at Ferrari when they were teammates. Rather than go through that again, Mansell left F1 for the CART IndyCar Series and joined Newman/Haas Racing, taking over the Kmart/Texaco-Havoline Lola-Ford that had been driven by Michael Andretti; Andretti, whose father Mario became Mansell's teammate, was leaving Indy racing to join up with McLaren, taking Gerhard Berger's place alongside Ayrton Senna.

Senna, however, was not certain to be a part of the McLaren team as 1993 began. Honda, which had been their engine supplier since 1988 and had won several world championships with both Senna and Prost, had decided to pull out of F1 following a downturn in the Japanese economy the previous year. Senna began exploring his options outside of McLaren, especially after they were unable to strike a deal with Renault to supply their engines, and one of them involved him potentially moving to Williams. Senna was so intent on driving for the defending world championship constructor that he offered to do so without collecting a salary.

However, Prost's relationship with Senna was significantly more testy than his with Mansell, and friction between the two had played a significant role in Prost's departure from McLaren after 1989. Having agreed to a two-year contract, and being well aware of Senna's desires, Prost negotiated veto power into his contract for 1993. This enabled him to decide whether or not Williams could hire a driver to pair with him; owing to their rivalry, Prost used that power to freeze Senna out of the second seat. Damon Hill, who had made his debut for Brabham in 1992 while still serving as Williams' test driver, was promoted to the vacant second seat; Senna instead signed a race-to-race contract to return to McLaren, driving with customer Ford engines that were not the same quality as the ones at Benetton. Berger would return to Ferrari while Brundle joined Ligier.

==== 1993 season ====
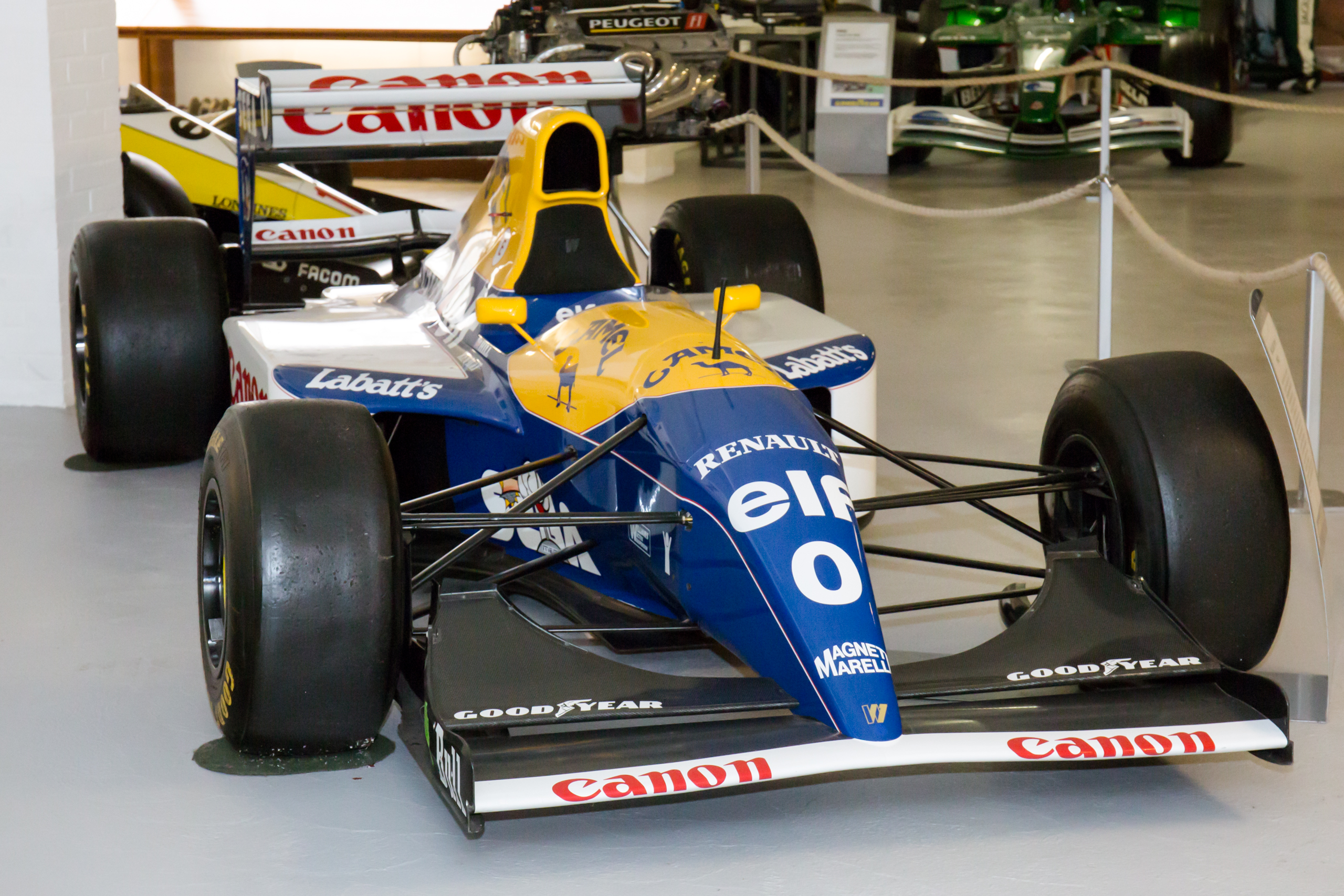
Damon Hill's Williams FW15C used for the 1993 season on display at the Donington Grand Prix Collection

The Williams FW15C was an extremely dominant car, with active suspension and traction control systems beyond anything available to the other teams. Prost won on his debut for the team in South Africa and, like Mansell, dominated the weekend, taking pole position and finishing a minute ahead of Senna, who was second. The next Grand Prix in Brazil saw Prost collide with Christian Fittipaldi's Minardi in the rain on lap 29, while Hill went on to his first podium finish: second, 16 seconds behind Senna. Prost won three of the next four Grands Prix for Williams, Senna winning the other race. Prost and Hill later scored a 1–2 in France: the only 1–2 of the season for Williams. Prost won the next two Grands Prix at Silverstone and Hockenheim. Hill proved competitive especially in the second half of the season. Mechanical problems cost Hill leads in Britain and Germany, but he went on to win the next three Grands Prix at Hungary, Belgium and Italy which moved him to second in the standings, as well as giving him a chance of taking the Drivers' title. After Italy, Williams would not win a Grand Prix for the rest of the season, as a young Michael Schumacher won the following race in Portugal, and Senna took Japan and Australia to overtake Hill in the points. Williams retained their Constructors' title, 84 points ahead of second-placed McLaren. Prost clinched the Drivers' Championship in Portugal and finished the season 26 points ahead of second-placed Senna.

Based on his victory in the 1992 World Championship, Mansell would have been issued car number 1 for the 1993 season, and his teammate issued number 2. However, Mansell's move to the IndyCar series meant that number 1 was not issued; instead, the team was issued the number 0, which was placed on Hill's car, while Prost was issued number 2.

1993 marked the final season that Williams ran with Canon as its primary backer.

==== 1994 season ====
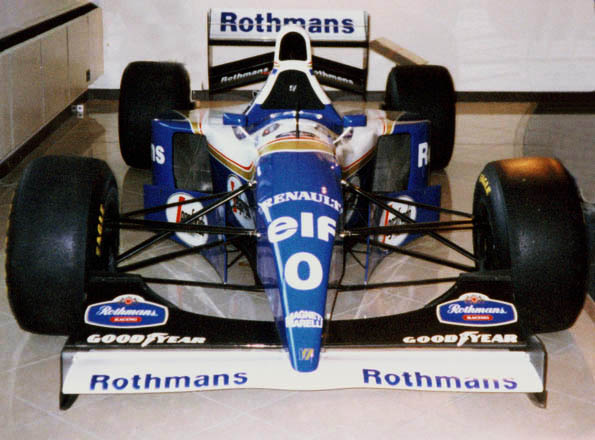
Williams FW16B used in the second half of the 1994 season when Rothmans debuted as the team's primary backer

During the 1994 season, Williams used FW16 (developed during the pre-season) and FW16B (with shorter sidepods and optimised for the revised floor regulations which were introduced during the season).

Needing a new backer once Canon withdrew at the end of 1993, Williams approached Rothmans International about signing on. The tobacco company agreed to do so, and pushed for the team to make an offer to Ayrton Senna to drive for them. Senna had been in negotiations with both Williams and Ferrari while continuing to drive for McLaren, but after Ferrari boss Jean Todt told him that he would not dismiss either Gerhard Berger or Jean Alesi from the team to free a space for him, any hope of a deal between them vanished. Alain Prost still was not interested in racing with Senna again, but he no longer would have veto power after 1993.

Therefore, on the weekend of the Portuguese Grand Prix, a series of announcements was made. First, Prost would be retiring at the end of the 1993 campaign regardless of the circumstances. Second, Senna and Williams had agreed to terms on a contract, which would see him take Prost's place as the lead driver. (A third announcement was also made involving the promotion of future world champion Mika Häkkinen to team with Senna for the rest of 1993, as Michael Andretti was sacked due to poor performance.)

Given this was the same team that had won the previous two World Championships with vastly superior cars, Senna was a natural and presumptive pre-season title favourite, with second-year driver Damon Hill intended to play the supporting role. Between them, Prost, Senna, and Hill had won every race in 1993 but one, which was taken by Benetton's Michael Schumacher. As with 1993, Williams's cars were issued numbers 0 and 2, following Prost's victory in the 1993 championship and subsequent retirement; Hill once again received the 0 while Senna ran with the 2.

Pre-season testing showed the FW16 had speed but was difficult to drive. The Fédération Internationale de l'Automobile (FIA) had banned electronic driver's aids, such as active suspension, traction control and ABS, to make the sport more "human". It was these technological advancements that the Williams chassis of the previous years had been built around. With their removal in 1994, the Williams had not been a good-handling car, as observed by other F1 drivers, having been seen to be very loose at the rear. Senna himself had made numerous comments that the Williams FW16 had quirks that needed to be ironed out. It was obvious that the FW16, after the regulation changes banning active suspension and traction control, exhibited none of the superiority of the FW15C and Williams FW14B cars that had preceded it. The surprise of testing was Benetton-Ford which was less powerful but more nimble than the Williams. This all would be reflected on the track when the season began; Senna managed to put the FW16 on the pole in the first two events, but retired from both while Schumacher brought his Benetton to the top of the podium.

Then, at Imola in the third race, everything changed. Qualifying on the pole for a third consecutive race, Senna was leading on Lap 7 when his car left the track at the high speed Tamburello corner; the accident proved fatal, and Senna became the first driver to be killed in a race since Riccardo Paletti crashed at Montreal during the 1982 Canadian Grand Prix. The repercussions of Senna's fatal accident were severe for the team itself, as the Italian prosecutors tried to charge the team and Frank Williams with manslaughter, an episode which was not over until 2005. At the next race in Monaco, Damon Hill was the only Williams on the grid, as a mark of respect to Senna, and retired on the first lap. After Senna's death, every Williams F1 car carried a Senna 'S' on its livery in his honour and to symbolise the team's ongoing support of the Instituto Ayrton Senna until the permanent removal starting in 2022, with then Williams CEO Jost Capito stating it was time to "move on".

At the next race in Spain, Williams brought in test driver David Coulthard as Hill's new teammate. Hill took the team's first victory of the season, by almost half a minute over Schumacher's Benetton, while Coulthard would retire due to an electrical problem. In Montreal, both Williams cars finished in the points for the first time that season, with Hill finishing second and Coulthard finishing fifth. At Silverstone, Damon Hill accomplished what had eluded his father, twice Formula One World Champion Graham Hill, by winning the British Grand Prix. Hill closed the points gap with Schumacher, who was disqualified from first at Spa after the Stewards found floorboard irregularities on his Benetton. He was banned for the next two races, and Hill capitalised on this with wins in Italy and a Williams 1–2 in Portugal.

The season also saw the return of Nigel Mansell to F1. After winning the CART championship in 1993, Mansell had struggled in his second and final season in the series and had also had a falling out with his teammate Mario Andretti. After the 1994 season had concluded, Mansell returned to Williams for a three-race appearance deal for £900,000 per race, while Hill was paid £300,000 for the entire season, though Hill remained as lead driver. Mansell also ran the French Grand Prix in a one-off at the behest of Renault.

Schumacher came back after his suspension for the European Grand Prix, which he won by about 25 seconds, to take a lead of 5 points into the penultimate round in Japan. The race in Japan was held in torrential rain, with Hill managing to win the restarted race by three seconds on aggregate over Schumacher who finished second. Going into the final round at Adelaide, Schumacher led Hill by a single point. Mansell took pole for Williams but had a poor start which let Hill and Schumacher through to fight for the lead and the 1994 title. Midway through the race, Schumacher's perceived need for a low downforce setup cost him, as he lost control and clipped the outside wall at the 5th corner (out of sight of Hill). As Schumacher recovered, Hill came around the corner and attempted to overtake into the next corner. Schumacher turned in and the resulting contact (Schumacher in the wall and Hill retiring with bent suspension) meant that Schumacher was the champion. This collision has been controversial with some, such as Williams's Patrick Head, have suggesting that this was a deliberate attempt by Schumacher to take Hill out of the race. Others, such as then BBC commentator Murray Walker, defended Schumacher, calling the accident a "racing incident". Meanwhile, Nigel Mansell won the last Grand Prix of his career here, driving the second Williams car.

Williams would end the season as Constructors' Champion for the third consecutive year, scoring 118 points, while Hill finished second in the Drivers' Championship with 91 points.

==== 1995 season ====
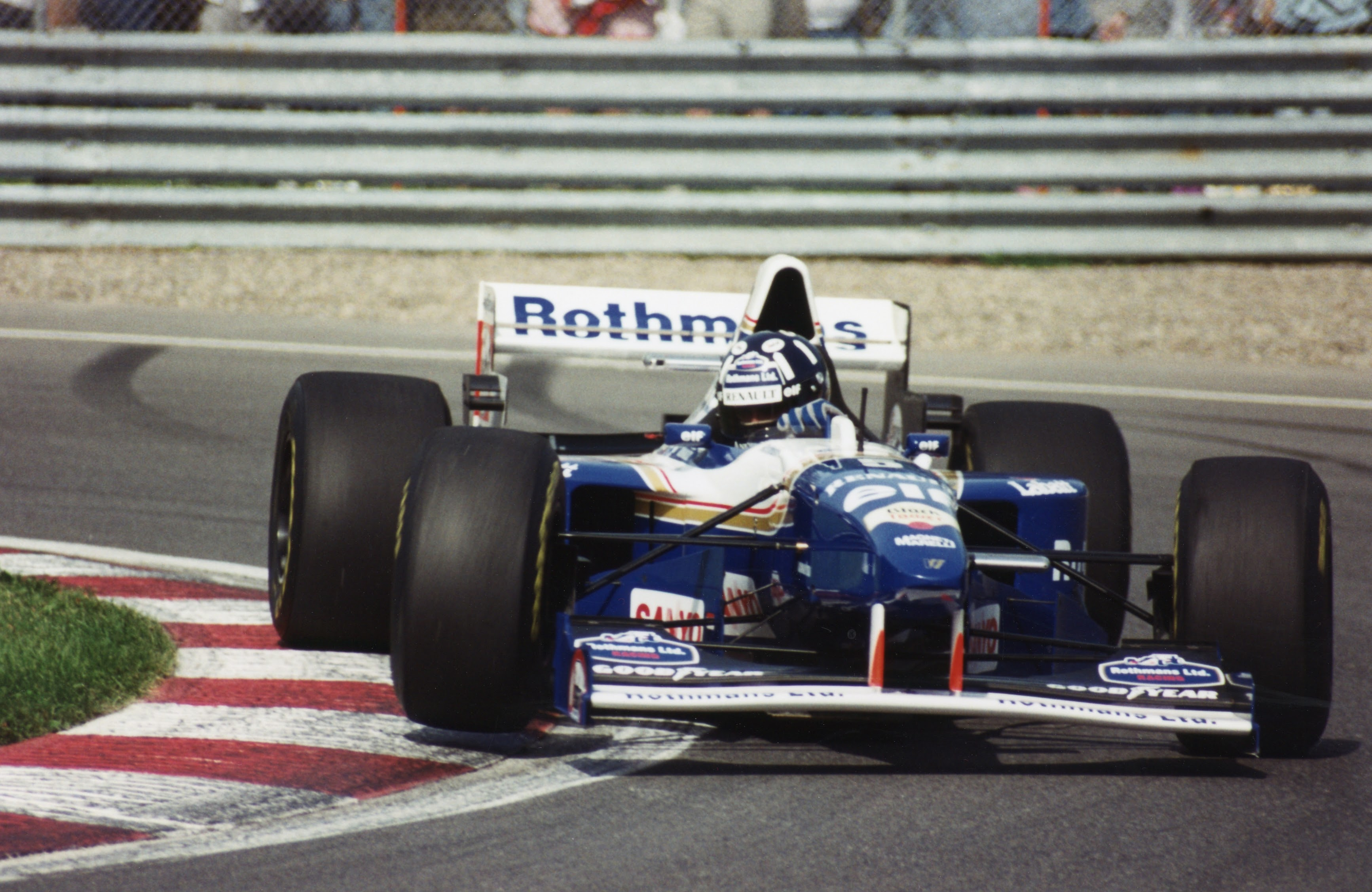
Damon Hill in the FW17 at Montreal in 1995 when he qualified second but retired after 50 race laps due to a gearbox problem

In July 2018, former Mercedes-Benz Motorsport Vice President Norbert Haug stated that before the 1995 season, Williams was close to a deal to secure Ilmor-built Mercedes-Benz factory engines. However, Mercedes eventually went on to partner with McLaren and thus Williams stayed with Renault engines instead. Prior to the season, the only other team that had been running Renault engines was Ligier, which had received the same works status as Williams had enjoyed despite its struggles. However, Benetton principal Flavio Briatore had purchased a stake in the French team in 1994; this gave him access to the engines and Renault moved its factory support from Ligier to Benetton as a result. This meant that defending world champion Michael Schumacher would be running the same engines as the dominant Williams teams of the previous several years had been, and the move would have a significant effect on the standings for Williams in 1995.

Despite the great strain the team had gone to in order to bring Nigel Mansell back to the team for his four-race stint in 1994, Williams elected not to return him to a full-time position and he departed for McLaren to pair with Mika Hakkinen in place of Martin Brundle. David Coulthard was instead given the full-time position in the car left vacant after Ayrton Senna's fatal crash, with Damon Hill being retained for the other car.

Schumacher won the first round in Brazil, with Coulthard taking second. However, both were disqualified from the race after it was found that Elf supplied their teams with a type of fuel for which samples had not been provided to the FIA. Thus, Gerhard Berger and Ferrari were declared winners. Schumacher and Coulthard had their positions reinstated after appeal, though Benetton and Williams were not awarded their constructors' points. Hill won the next two races in Argentina and San Marino and would later win races at The Hungaroring and in Adelaide. Hill won two laps ahead of the field at Adelaide in one of F1's most dominating victories. Coulthard recorded his only 1995 win for the Williams team at Estoril.

Williams lost both the driver's and constructor's championships to Benetton, finishing 29 points behind their new stablemates in the Renault lineup. Hill finished second behind Schumacher in the points, 33 behind, while Coulthard finished in fourth, 47 points behind Schumacher.

==== 1996 season ====
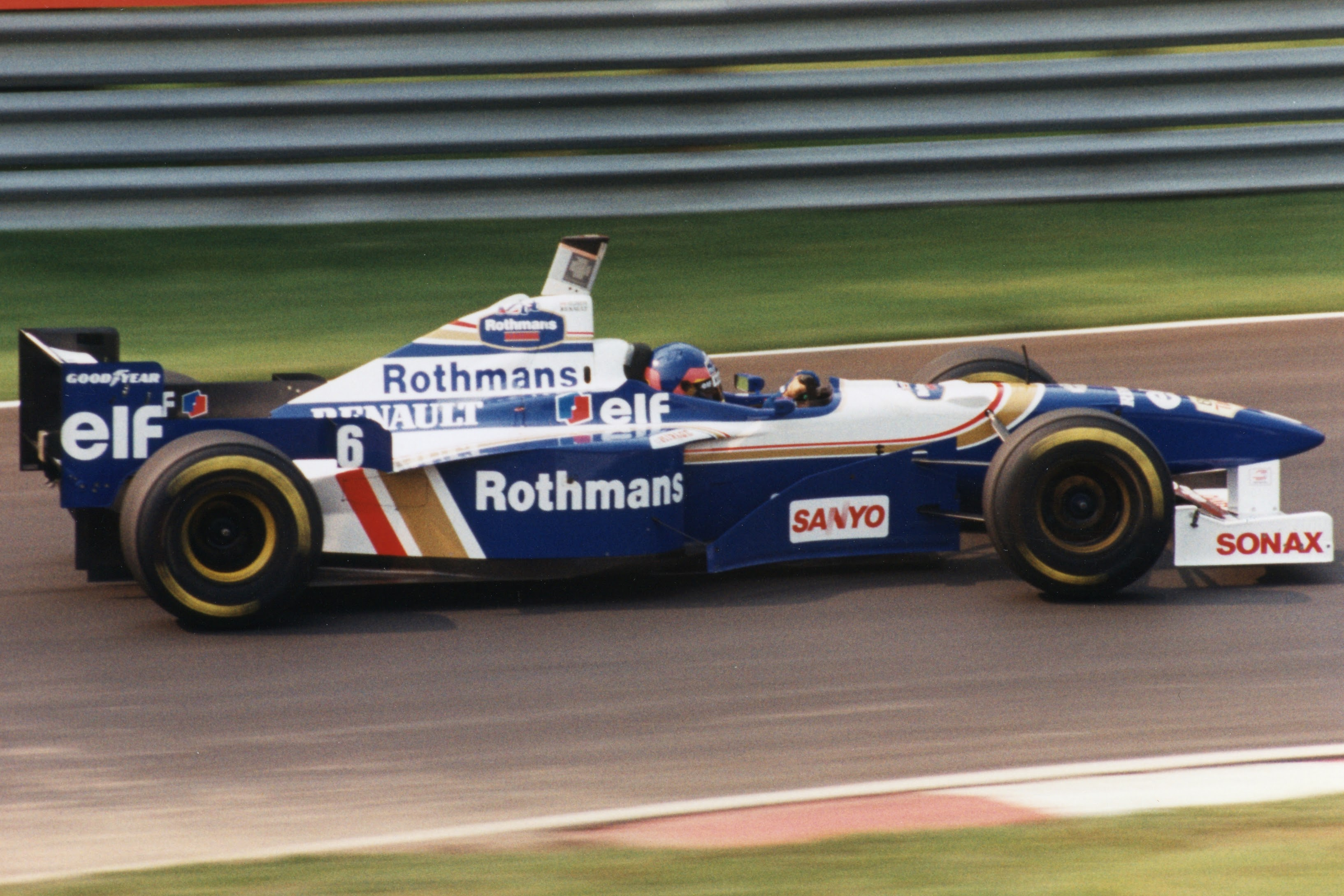
Jacques Villeneuve in the FW18 at the 1996 Canadian Grand Prix

For 1996, Williams again found itself replacing one of its drivers as David Coulthard left the team to pilot the second McLaren alongside Mika Häkkinen. They looked to the Indy ranks and signed Jacques Villeneuve, son of former Ferrari driver Gilles, who had just won both the Indianapolis 500 and the CART World Series in 1995. Damon Hill returned for a fourth full season, and with defending world champion Michael Schumacher now driving for the struggling Scuderia Ferrari, Williams was looking to return to championship form.

As luck would have for them, Williams had the quickest and most reliable car, the FW18. Williams won five of the first six Grands Prix, with the only other win in that span coming from Ligier's Olivier Panis in Monaco in a race where neither Hill nor Villeneuve finished. Between them, Hill and Villeneuve won twelve of the sixteen events (Schumacher won the other three besides Monaco), which helped Williams regain the constructor's championship early; they also were so dominant that as the season neared its end, only they could mathematically win the driver's championship. Hill clinched the championship with a win in the season finale at Suzuka, with Villeneuve retiring. Hill finished with 97 points, 19 more than Villeneuve.

Despite his championship run, Hill's contract was expiring and Frank Williams announced that it would not be renewed. At the end of the season, Adrian Newey also left the team despite still being under contract as he felt he was never going to become the team's technical director. Hill joined up with Arrows for 1997, while Newey joined McLaren after sitting out a period of garden leave.

In the middle of the 1996 season, Williams moved from its longtime Didcot headquarters to Grove, 15 kilometers away. Before the move, the racing press occasionally referred to Williams as "the Didcot team."

==== 1997 season ====
For what would be the final season of Williams-Renault and a car designed with Newey's input, Frank Williams brought in German Heinz-Harald Frentzen, who had created a good impression on Williams during his first few seasons in Formula One. Frentzen proved to be a disappointment though, and won only one race in two years with Williams, the 1997 San Marino Grand Prix. Jacques Villeneuve won seven races during 1997, compared to five wins by his main rival, Michael Schumacher of a resurgent Ferrari. Williams also achieved the 100-race-win milestone at the British Grand Prix. Coming to the final round of the season at Jerez, Schumacher led Villeneuve by 1 point; however, on lap 48, Schumacher and Villeneuve collided. Schumacher was disqualified from second place in the championship as the accident was deemed by the FIA as "avoidable". Williams won the Constructors' title for the second time in a row, scoring 123 points. Jacques Villeneuve won the Drivers' Championship by three points to Michael Schumacher, who kept his points total despite being removed from second place; thus, runner-up went to Frentzen with 42 points.

=== Mecachrome engines (1998) ===
==== 1998 season ====
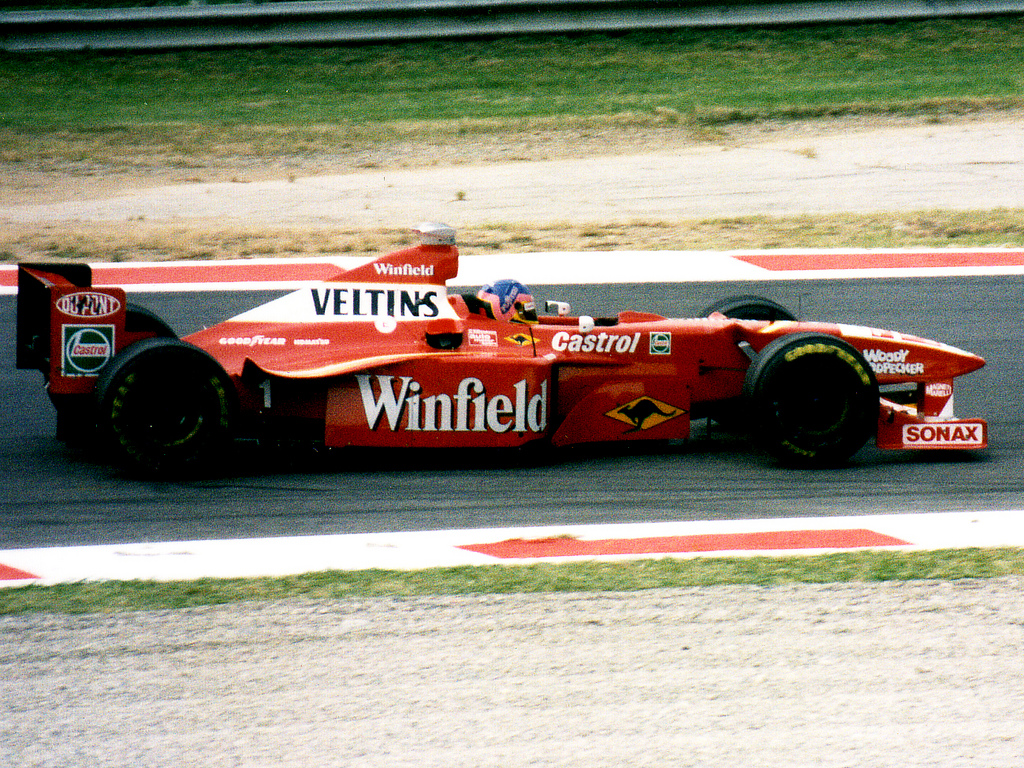
Jacques Villeneuve in the FW20 at the 1998 Italian Grand Prix

After 1997, the team was unable to maintain their dominance in Formula 1. In addition to the departure of Newey, Williams lost its engine supplier after Renault decided to pull out of F1, leading them to partner with Mecachrome for 1998 to provide them with what were essentially the same engines, just rebadged. This, coupled with the design of the FW20, led some to comment that they ran what was virtually the same car, adjusted for the 1998 regulations.

A further change involved the team's livery. For most of the existence of the Williams team as it was constructed, and especially since 1985, the team's colors featured some shade of blue, such as the violet-blue from their years with Canon and their current lighter navy color since taking on Rothmans as a backer. However, for 1998, Rothmans had decided to use the Williams machines to promote one of their other tobacco brands in Winfield. As such, the Mecachromes were painted with red and white to represent the brand; this would be the first time a Frank Williams-produced car would carry a red livery since his original team, Frank Williams Racing Cars, ran with backing from Marlboro in the early 1970s. For 1998,

Williams kept both drivers from the previous season, the first time since 1983 that a reigning world champion remained driving for the team and also the first time since Nigel Mansell returned to the team for 1991 that they had retained the same drivers for consecutive seasons. However, as mentioned, they struggled mightily while both Ferrari and McLaren battled for the Constructors' and Drivers' titles. Williams fell to the middle of the field.

The team won no races and took only 3 podiums during the season, with a best finish of third by both drivers. Frentzen finishing in third at the first round in Australia and Villeneuve finishing third in Germany and Hungary. Williams finished third in the Constructors' Championship, scoring 38 points, while Villeneuve finished fifth in the Drivers' Championship with 21 points, and his German teammate, Frentzen, finished 4 points behind him in seventh.

=== Supertec engines (1999) ===
==== 1999 season ====
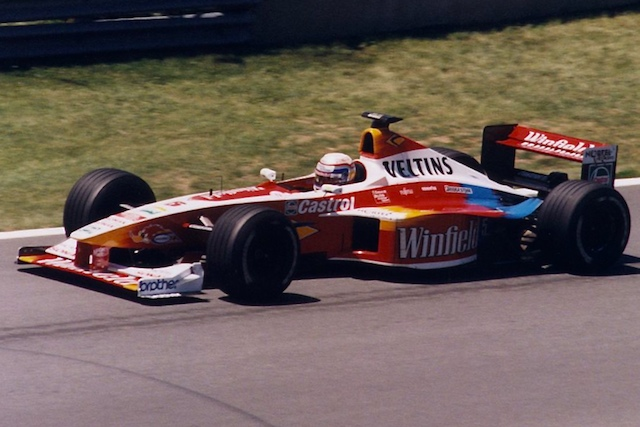
Alessandro Zanardi in the FW21 at the 1999 Canadian Grand Prix

For the first time since 1993, Williams replaced both of its drivers for 1999. Jacques Villeneuve was lured away from Williams by the new British American Racing, which had been formed by British American Tobacco and Craig Pollock, Villeneuve's manager, after their purchase of the financially strapped former world champion in Tyrrell Racing. Heinz-Harald Frentzen, meanwhile, was sacked after his struggles and he signed with Jordan to pair with former world champion Damon Hill, who had joined Jordan after a disastrous campaign with Arrows.

In what would amount to two driver swaps, Frentzen's replacement would be Ralf Schumacher. who had been driving for Jordan but had left under acrimonious terms following an incident where he was ordered to run behind teammate Damon Hill at Spa. An angry Michael Schumacher, Ralf's brother, went to Eddie Jordan after the race and told him that his brother would never be driving for him again once the season was over; Jordan said he would only let Ralf out of his contract if a $2 million buyout was paid, which Michael paid out on behalf of his brother.

Meanwhile, the second swap involved Chip Ganassi Racing in the CART series. At the time, Williams employed young Colombian Juan Pablo Montoya as its test driver. Meanwhile, in CART, Alex Zanardi had been putting on a series of outstanding performances. Since joining the series for 1996, he had finished in the top three in series points all three years, had won the series championship twice, and recorded fifteen victories in fifty-one starts. During his first championship season, Zanardi had actually contacted Frank Williams to inform him of his interest in driving for the team. Williams reciprocated the interest, and a deal was worked out between the sides. In July of 1998, Zanardi signed a three-year contract to join Williams, and Montoya signed a three-year contract to replace him at Ganassi. This marked a return to F1 for the Italian, who had previously raced in the series from 1991 through 1994 with very little success. It was hoped that, having done so well in the CART series in the interim, that he would be able to build on that success and become a dominant F1 driver for a team that was looking to regain its championship form.

However, if 1998 was a struggle, 1999 proved even more so. Running another series of rebadged Renault engines, this time under the Supertec branding, Williams finished with a total of 35 points and once again failed to win a Grand Prix. Furthermore, all of those points were scored with Schumacher, who took a third place in Australia and Britain and a second place in Italy. Zanardi, meanwhile, struggled mightily in his return to F1 and retired from eleven events, finishing eighth twice; he was one of six drivers, including former world champion Villeneuve, to not record a single point for the season. Schumacher's point total left him sixth in the final standings, finishing behind brother Michael who missed most of the season after breaking his leg in a crash at Silverstone.

After the season, Williams and Zanardi agreed to terminate their contract after one season. Zanardi took a sabbatical for the 2000 season, returning to CART for 2001 with Mo Nunn Racing. After struggling to regain his form, Zanardi would find himself leading at the Lausitzring in September of that year when he spun out onto the track and was violently struck by another car; he suffered a traumatic amputation of both of his legs, which ended his open-wheel racing career. Zanardi would return to racing in touring cars and eventually became a successful paracyclist, passing on in 2026 at the age of 59.

=== BMW engines (2000–2005) ===
Team logo during partnership with BMW

In 1998, the team signed a long-term agreement with German manufacturer BMW to supply engines and expertise for a period of 6 years. As part of the deal, BMW expected at least one driver to be German, which led to the team's signing of Ralf Schumacher for the subsequent season. In 1999, the team had a Williams car with a BMW engine testing at circuits, in preparation for a debut in the 2000 season.

There were major sponsorship changes for 2000–2005, as Rothmans International had been purchased in 1999 by British American Tobacco (BAT), which owned British American Racing and chose not to renew Rothmans's contract with Williams. BMW paid for Williams cars to be entirely in blue and white – unlike the standard motorsport livery scheme, dominated by the colours of the team or major sponsors with the logos of minor sponsors in their own colour schemes. Williams's second major sponsor became Compaq, and following Compaq's acquisition the team debuted Hewlett-Packard (HP) sponsorship at the 2002 British Grand Prix. In a cross-promotion of this technological partnership, a worldwide television commercial featured drivers Ralf Schumacher and Juan Pablo Montoya seemingly driving their BMW Williams cars around a track by radio control from a grandstand.

The new "clean" image allowed Williams to sign a cigarette anti-craving brand, Niquitin, and Anheuser-Busch, alternating with the Budweiser beer brand and SeaWorld Adventure Parks, in compliance with trademark disputes or alcohol bans.

==== 2000 season ====
To replace Zanardi, Britain's Jenson Button made his series debut. The first season of Williams's partnership with BMW did not yield a single victory, but they managed to get on the podium three times, with Ralf Schumacher responsible for all three. Williams finished third in the Constructors' Championship, with 36 points, one more than the prior year. Ralf Schumacher finished fifth in the Drivers' Championship, while Button, in his debut season, finished in eighth. Button made scrappy mistakes in early races (Monaco, Europe), but overall made an impressive debut in Melbourne, and continued to impress, notably at Silverstone, Spa, and Suzuka.

==== 2001 season ====
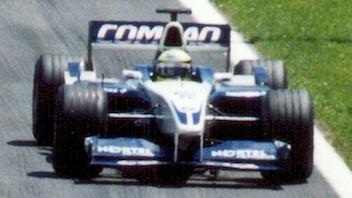
Williams returned to the winner's rostrum in 2001 with four Grands Prix victories including one for Ralf Schumacher in Montreal.

In 2001, the arrangement between Williams and Ganassi came to an end, and thus Williams was able to bring Juan Pablo Montoya back to drive full-time for the team. He was returning after two successful years in CART, where he succeeded Zanardi as champion for 1999 and won ten races total; he also had become the first CART driver since the infamous 1996 split of American open-wheel racing to win the Indianapolis 500, doing so in 2000.

Since Montoya was returning to Williams, this left Jenson Button as the odd man out. He would move over to Benetton, which was still running rebadged Renault engines, for what was the team's final season under that name.

The FW23 won four races, three by Ralf Schumacher at Imola, Montreal, and his home Grand Prix in Germany. His teammate, Montoya, was victorious at Monza, and would have won a few more races if not for the FW23's unreliability and pit crew blunders. The car proved to be quicker than the Ferrari and McLaren counterparts in several races, but Williams's 2001 campaign only yielded third place in the Constructors' Championship.

==== 2002 season ====
Williams maintained their driver line-up for the 2002 season. The team only won one race, which was at Malaysia, one of only 2 races not won by Ferrari in a year dominated by the Ferraris of Michael Schumacher and Rubens Barrichello. Despite Montoya qualifying on pole for 7 races, he ended up having a winless season. Williams did improve on their Constructors' Championship position, finishing in second. Montoya finished third in the Drivers' Championship, eight points ahead of Ralf Schumacher, who finished fourth.

In qualifying for the Italian Grand Prix at the 5.793 km (3.600 mi) Monza circuit, Montoya lapped his Williams FW24 in 1:20.264 for an average speed of 161.449 mph (259.827 km/h), breaking the speed record of 160.938 mph (259.005 km/h) set by Keke Rosberg in a Honda turbo-powered Williams FW10 at Silverstone for the 1985 British Grand Prix.

==== 2003 season ====
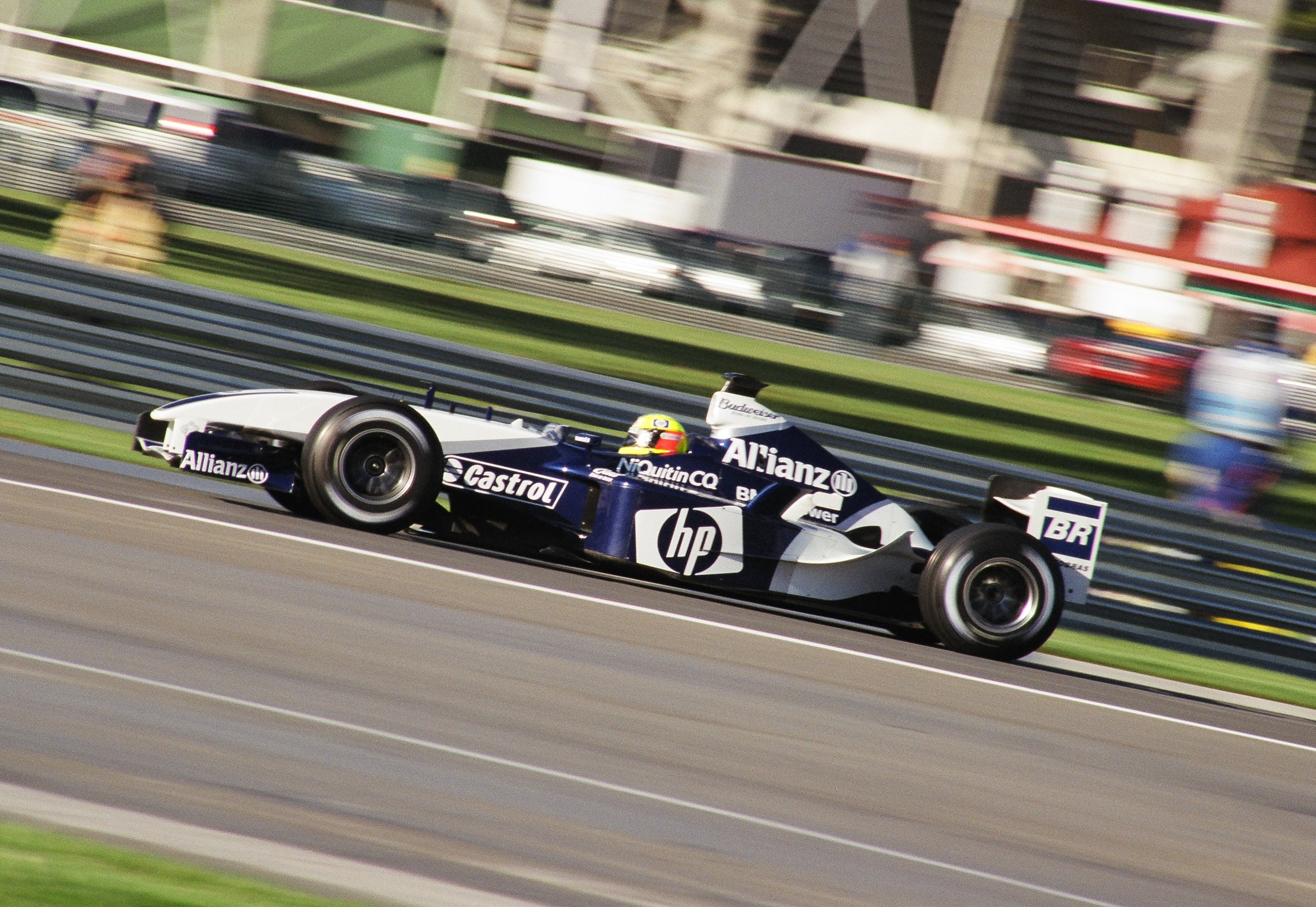
Schumacher in the FW25 at the 2003 United States Grand Prix where he qualified fifth before retiring after 21 race laps

2003 would see Williams come closest to winning its first title since 1997. During pre-season, Frank Williams was very confident that the FW25 would challenge for the title. The team won four races, with Montoya winning at Monaco and Germany, while Ralf Schumacher won at the Nürburgring and the following race at Magny-Cours. Montoya stayed in contention for the Drivers' Championship during the season, and finished third, 11 points behind Michael Schumacher, while Ralf Schumacher finished fifth, 24 points behind Montoya. Williams finished second in the Constructors' Championship, two points ahead of McLaren.

==== 2004 season ====
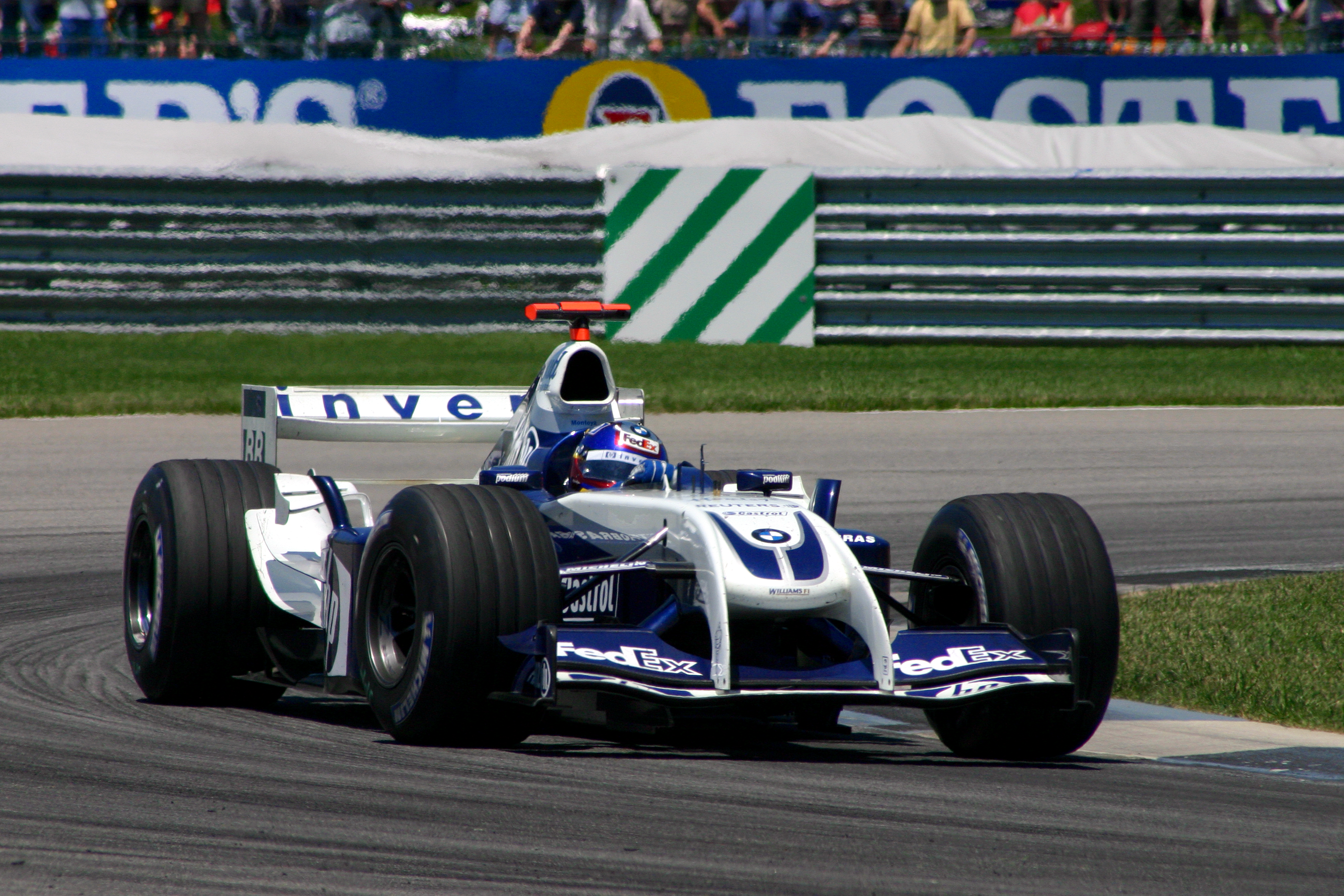
Juan Pablo Montoya in the "Walrus-Nose" designed Williams FW26 during the 2004 United States Grand Prix when he qualified fifth for the race but was disqualified for illegally using the spare car

At the start of the 2004 season, it was announced that Montoya would be moving to McLaren in 2005. The team began the season with a radical nose-cone design, known as the "Walrus-Nose", that proved uncompetitive and was replaced by a more conventional assembly in Hungary. Ferrari dominated for a third consecutive season, winning 15 of the 18 races. Williams picked up a win at the final race in Brazil, with Juan Pablo Montoya finishing one second ahead of Kimi Räikkönen's McLaren; this remained Williams's last F1 win until the 2012 Spanish Grand Prix. Another low part of the season was when both Williams and Toyota were disqualified from the Canadian Grand Prix after it was discovered that both cars had brake irregularities, the brake ducts seemingly not conforming to regulations. Williams finished the season in fourth, scoring 88 points and finishing on the podium six times, while Montoya was the highest-placed Williams driver that year, scoring 58 points to finish in fifth position.

==== 2005 season ====
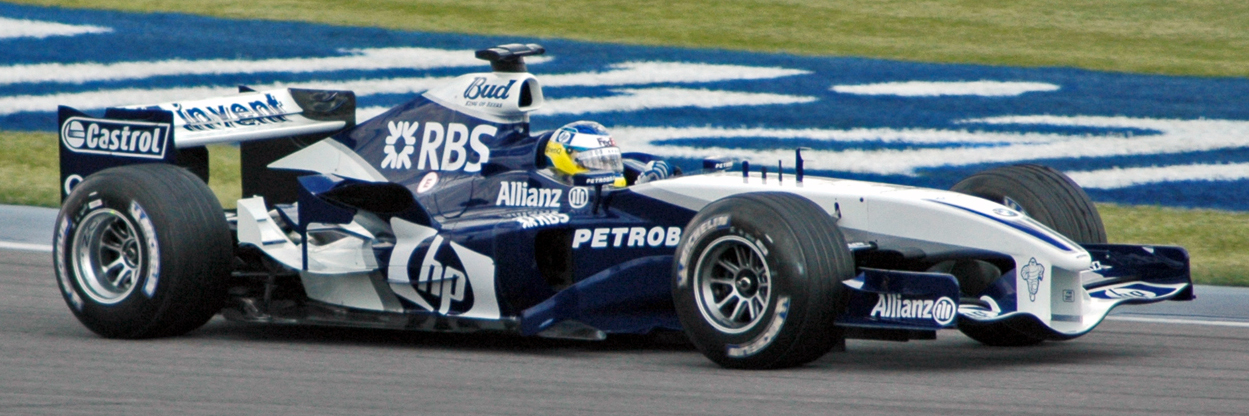
Nick Heidfeld in the FW27 during practice for the 2005 United States GP

For the 2005 season, Schumacher moved to Toyota, while Montoya moved to McLaren. Taking their places were Australian Mark Webber and German Nick Heidfeld. Jenson Button was to have driven for Williams in 2005, but an FIA ruling forced Button to remain with his current team, BAR. Antônio Pizzonia served as the test driver for the team during the 2005 season. Meanwhile, Button signed a contract to drive for Williams in 2006.

Although there was some positive moments, such as a double podium finish in Monaco and Heidfeld qualifying on pole position at the Nürburgring, Williams slipped further back down the field in 2005, due in part to the return to form of rivals McLaren and the emergence of Toyota as a front-running team. Williams failed to win a race for the first time since 2000, and only registered four podium finishes over the course of the season, finishing fifth in the Constructors' Championship with 66 points. Heidfeld was replaced by Pizzonia for the last five races of the season after the former suffered firstly a testing accident, and then was hit by a motorbike when out cycling prior to the race in Brazil. Pizzonia could only contribute two points towards the team's tally.

During the course of the 2004 and 2005 F1 seasons, BMW Motorsport and director Mario Theissen increasingly became publicly critical of the Williams F1 team's inability to create a package capable of winning the Constructors' Championship, or even multiple victories within a single season. Williams, on the other hand, blamed BMW for not producing a good enough engine. Williams's failed attempt to prise Jenson Button out of his BAR contract may also have been an issue with Theissen. Despite Frank Williams's rare decision to capitulate to commercial demands by employing German driver Nick Heidfeld when he allegedly preferred Antônio Pizzonia, the fallout between Williams and BMW continued through the 2005 Formula One season. Despite BMW's contract with Williams to supply engines until 2009, this public deterioration of the relationship between Williams and BMW was a factor in the decision by BMW Motorsport to buy Sauber and rebrand that team to feature the BMW name.

=== Cosworth engines (2006) ===
==== 2006 season ====
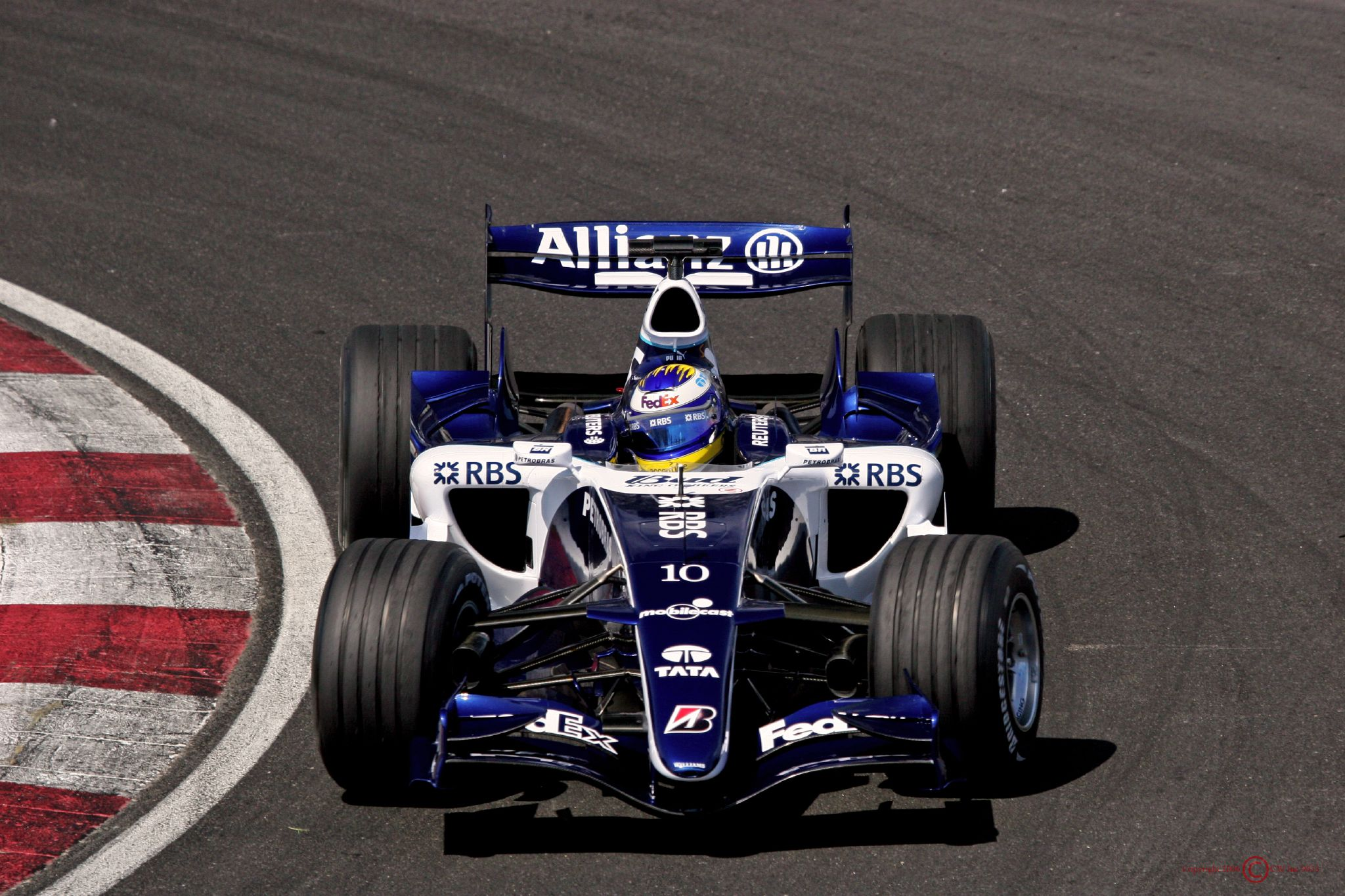
Nico Rosberg in the FW28-Cosworth at the 2006 Canadian Grand Prix

Williams opted for Cosworth V8 engines for the 2006 which saw Nico Rosberg replace Nick Heidfeld, who departed for BMW Sauber, while Mark Webber stayed on with the team. Despite having signed a contract to race for Williams, Jenson Button decided to stay with BAR for 2006 as it was to become a Honda works team. In September 2005 a deal was reached to allow Button to remain with BAR, with Williams receiving around £24m, some of it paid by Button himself, to cancel this contract.

Williams and Cosworth entered a partnership agreement where Cosworth would supply engines, transmissions and associated electronics and software for the team. Major sponsors Hewlett-Packard concluded sponsorship agreements one year before their official end of contract. The Williams team also switched to Bridgestone tyres.

The season started well, with both drivers scoring points in the opening race of the season, and Nico Rosberg setting the fastest lap at the Bahrain Grand Prix. The rest of the season was disappointing for Williams, with 20 retirements out of 36 starts for the two cars. The team failed to finish on the podium all season, the first time this had happened since Williams's debut season in 1977. The team eventually finished eighth in the Constructors' Championship, with only 11 points.

=== Customer Toyota engines (2007–2009) ===
==== 2007–2009 seasons ====
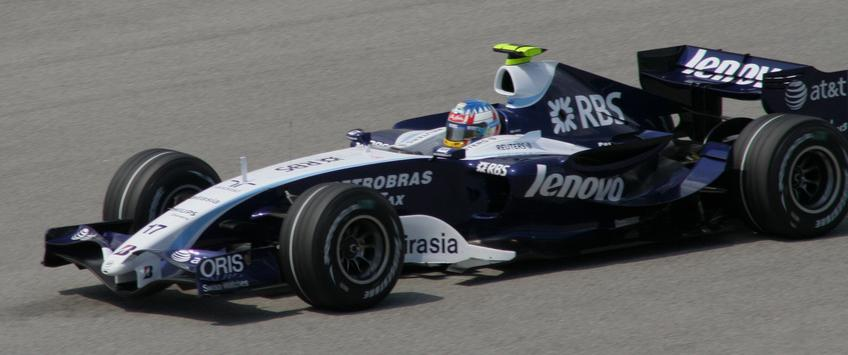
Alexander Wurz at the 2007 Malaysian Grand Prix

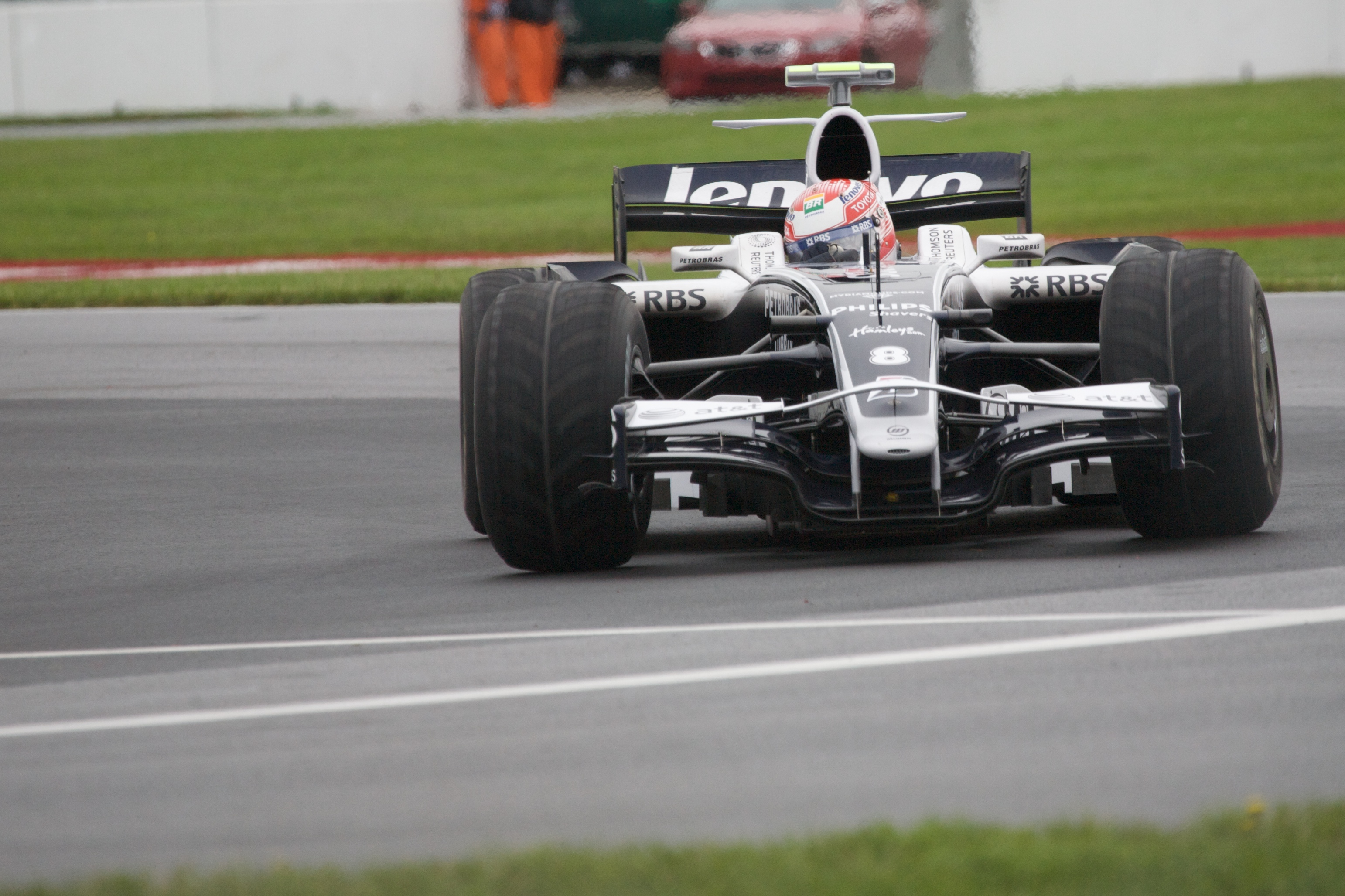
Kazuki Nakajima at the 2008 Canadian Grand Prix

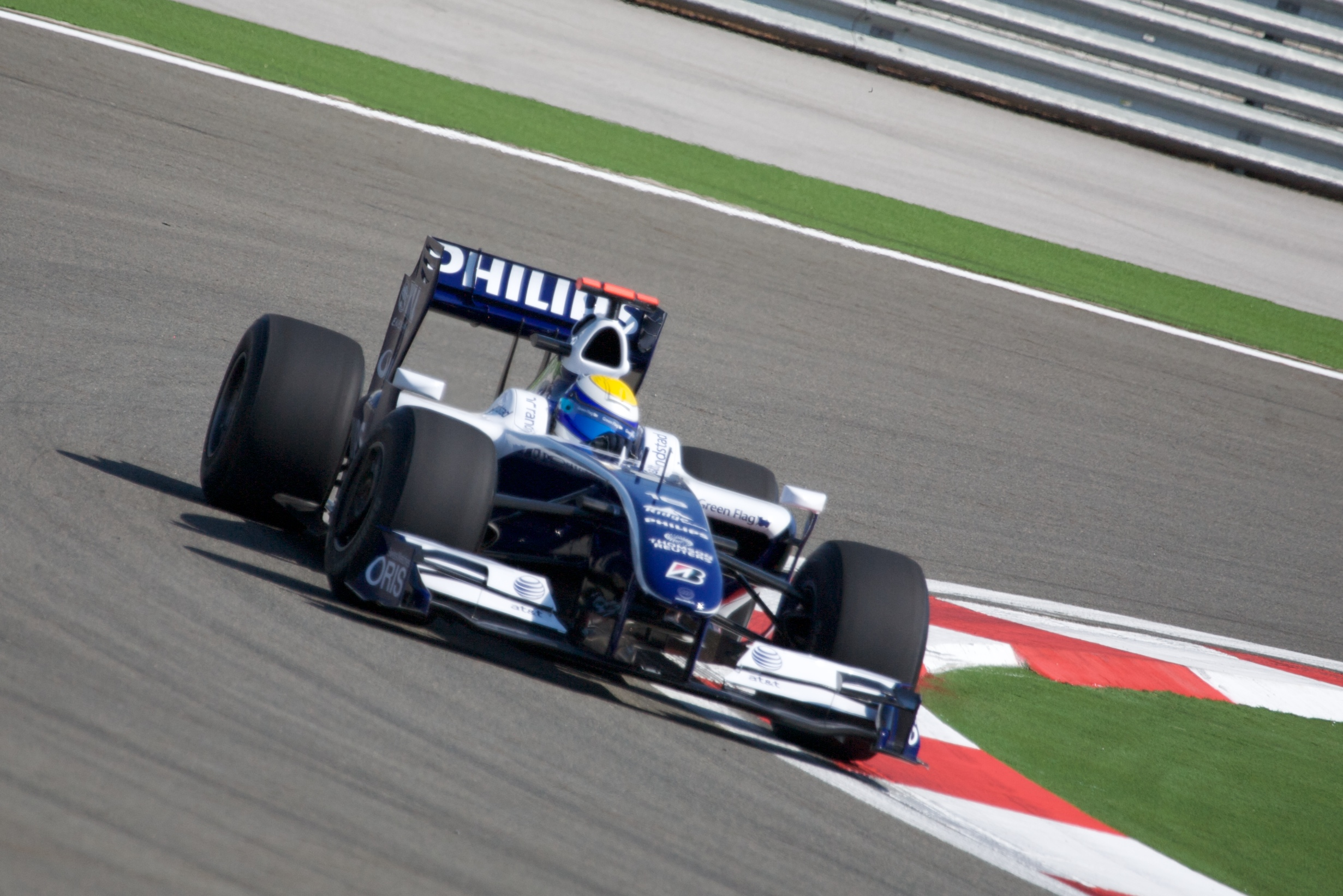
Nico Rosberg at the 2009 Turkish Grand Prix

Following Williams's worst points tally since 1978, the team announced that they would be switching from Cosworth to Toyota as their engine supplier for the 2007 season. In addition, the Toyota engine customer deal also included Magneti Marelli Step 11 engine control unit (ECU) systems and Panasonic battery package as it was used by the manufacturer's works team. A number of other changes were announced for 2007: Alexander Wurz, who had been a test driver at Williams since 2006, became the team's second driver to replace the outgoing Mark Webber; Japanese driver Kazuki Nakajima, son of Satoru, replaced Wurz as a test driver alongside Karthikeyan. Sponsorship saw a change in 2007, as it was announced that AT&T would become the title sponsors for the team from the upcoming season. AT&T was previously involved as minor sponsors with the Jaguar and McLaren teams but moved to Williams following McLaren's announcement of a title sponsorship deal with Vodafone, a competitor of AT&T. On 2 February, the new FW29 was presented to the media in the UK. Soon afterwards, the team secured a sponsorship deal with Lenovo who built the team's new supercomputer.

Rosberg and Wurz gave Williams a more productive season in terms of points and, in Montreal, Wurz scored the team's first podium finish since Nick Heidfeld's second-place at the 2005 European Grand Prix. Over the course of the year, Rosberg was consistently in the points, scoring 20 during the season; in comparison, teammate Wurz finished in the points three times. Following the announcement that Wurz would be retiring from the sport, Williams brought in their young test driver Nakajima to drive the second car for them in the final race in Brazil. The Japanese driver finished in tenth despite starting from near the back of the grid, while Rosberg enjoyed his best race of the season, finishing in fourth. Williams finished fourth in the Constructors' Championship that year.

For the 2008 season, Williams confirmed Nico Rosberg and Kazuki Nakajima as their race drivers. Rosberg was confirmed as staying with Williams until the end of 2009 on 9 December 2007, ending speculation that he could take Fernando Alonso's vacated seat at McLaren. During the Winter testing sessions, the team ran six different liveries to celebrate their 30th year in the sport and their 500th Grand Prix.

The 2008 season was a mixture of success and disappointment for Williams. While Rosberg managed to obtain 2 podiums in Australia and Singapore, the team struggled at circuits with high-speed corners. The fact that the team was one of the first to switch development to their 2009 car (when new regulations came in) also hindered their season and Williams finished a disappointing 8th in the Constructors' Championship. Rosberg stated that unless the team was more competitive in the near future, he would look to drive elsewhere. Williams retained Rosberg and Nakajima for the 2009 season.

Frank Williams had admitted that he had regretted parting with BMW but stated that Toyota had a tremendous ability to become a top engine supplier. Speculation had been surrounding Toyota's future on the Formula 1 grid. This was due to the fact that for a big-budget team, Toyota had only managed second place as their best result. In December 2008, Williams confirmed their commitment to F1 following the Honda withdrawal announcement.

Ahead of the 2009 Brazilian Grand Prix, Williams announced that it would be ending its three-year partnership with Toyota and finding a new engine supplier for 2010; Toyota would ultimately pull out of Formula 1 altogether at the end of the season.

=== Return to Cosworth engines (2010–2011) ===
==== 2010–2011 seasons ====
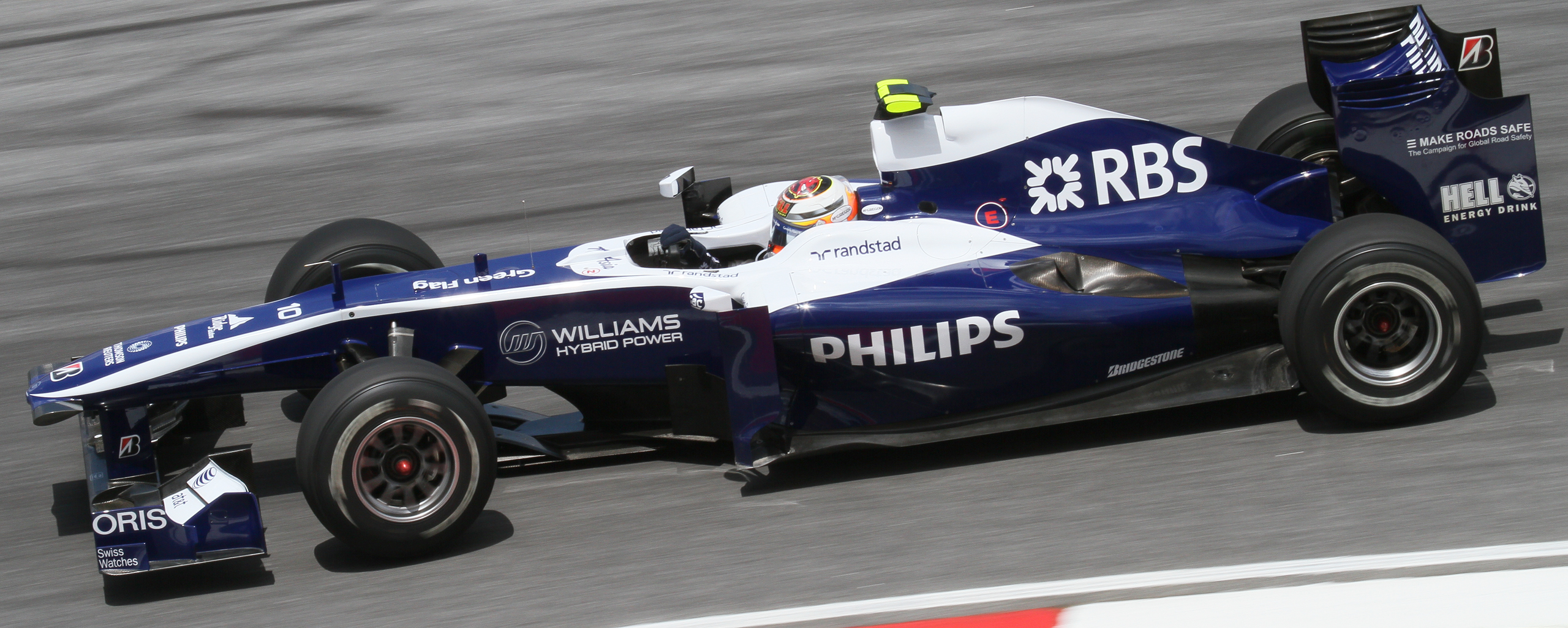
Nico Hülkenberg at the 2010 Malaysian Grand Prix

After the termination of their Toyota contract, Williams announced that from the 2010 season they were to enter into a "long-term partnership" with Cosworth, and would be using an updated version of the CA V8 engine which powered their cars in 2006. Williams also announced a complete driver change for the 2010 season. Rubens Barrichello joined from 2009 Constructors' Champion Brawn GP, whilst GP2 champion Nico Hülkenberg graduated from the test driver seat. Replacing Hülkenberg in the test seat was Finland's Valtteri Bottas, who finished third in the 2009 Formula Three Euroseries as well as winning the non-championship Masters of Formula 3 event at Zandvoort.

Their new 2010 car, the Williams FW32, was unveiled for the first time at a shakedown test at Silverstone. Its first official test was on 1 February at Circuit Ricardo Tormo in Valencia. Hülkenberg took the team's first pole position in over five years, in variable conditions at the Brazilian Grand Prix. Hülkenberg was dropped from the team ahead of the 2011 season, and replaced by Venezuelan newcomer and reigning GP2 Series champion Pastor Maldonado. The combination of Barrichello and Maldonado meant that 2011 would be the first time since 1981 that Williams would start a season without a European driver in their line-up.

At the second pre-season test in Jerez, Barrichello posted the fastest time of the week on the last day. That was to no avail as Williams endured one of their worst seasons to date: two ninth places for Barrichello and one tenth place for Maldonado were their best results during the entire year. After Brazil, the team ended with a ninth place in the Constructors' Championship.

=== Return to Renault engines (2012–2013) ===
==== 2012–2013 seasons ====
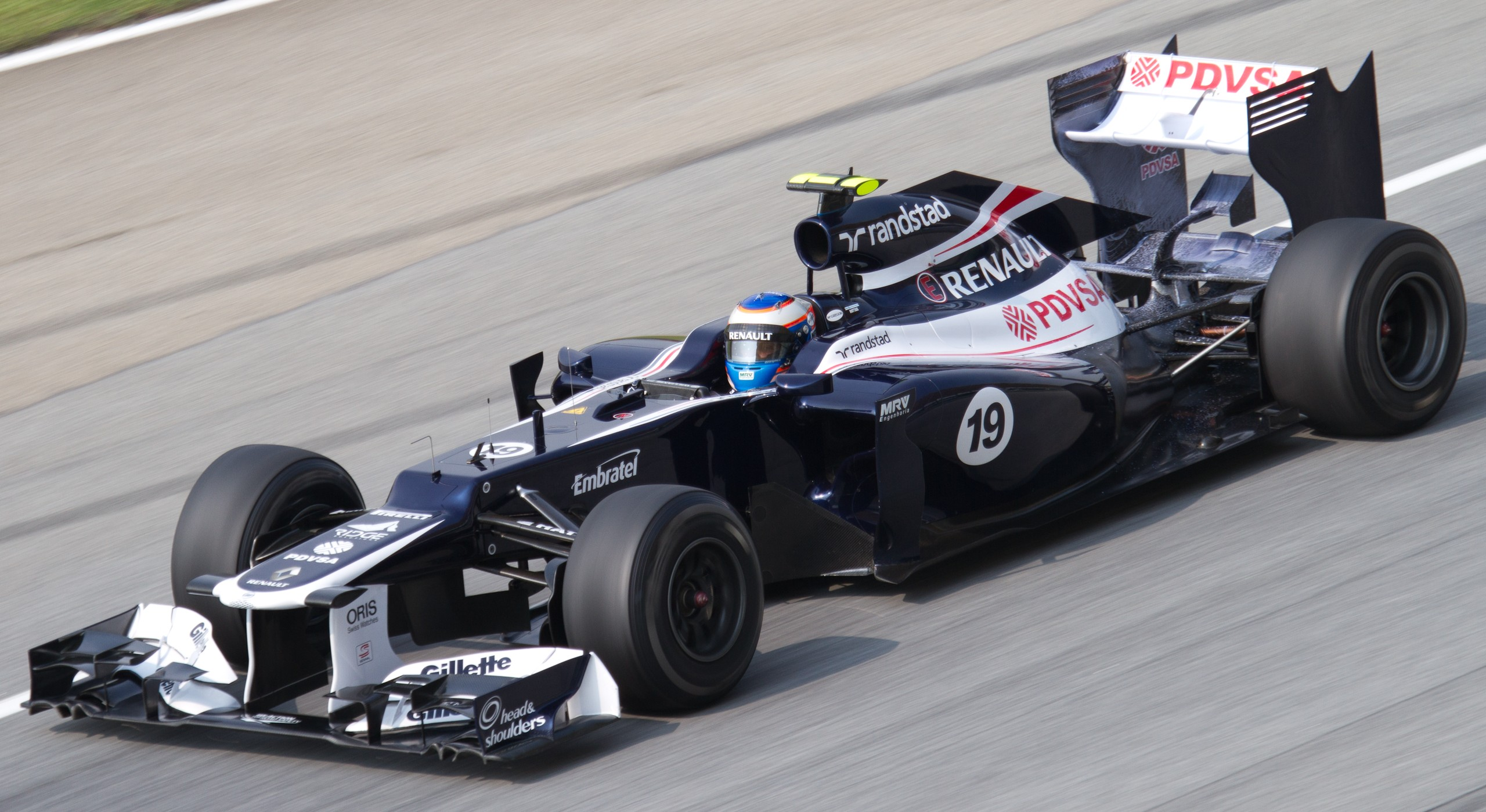
Valtteri Bottas, the team's 2012 reserve driver, participated in 15 free practice sessions including at the Malaysian Grand Prix then was promoted to a race seat for the 2013 season.

On 4 July 2011, Williams announced they would be reuniting with engine-supplier Renault who were to supply the team's engines from 2012 onwards. On 1 December 2011, it was confirmed that Maldonado would be retained for the 2012 season, along with reserve driver Valtteri Bottas, who took part in 15 Friday practice sessions. In January 2012, it was confirmed that Bruno Senna would be the driver to partner Maldonado, effectively ending Rubens Barrichello's F1 career.

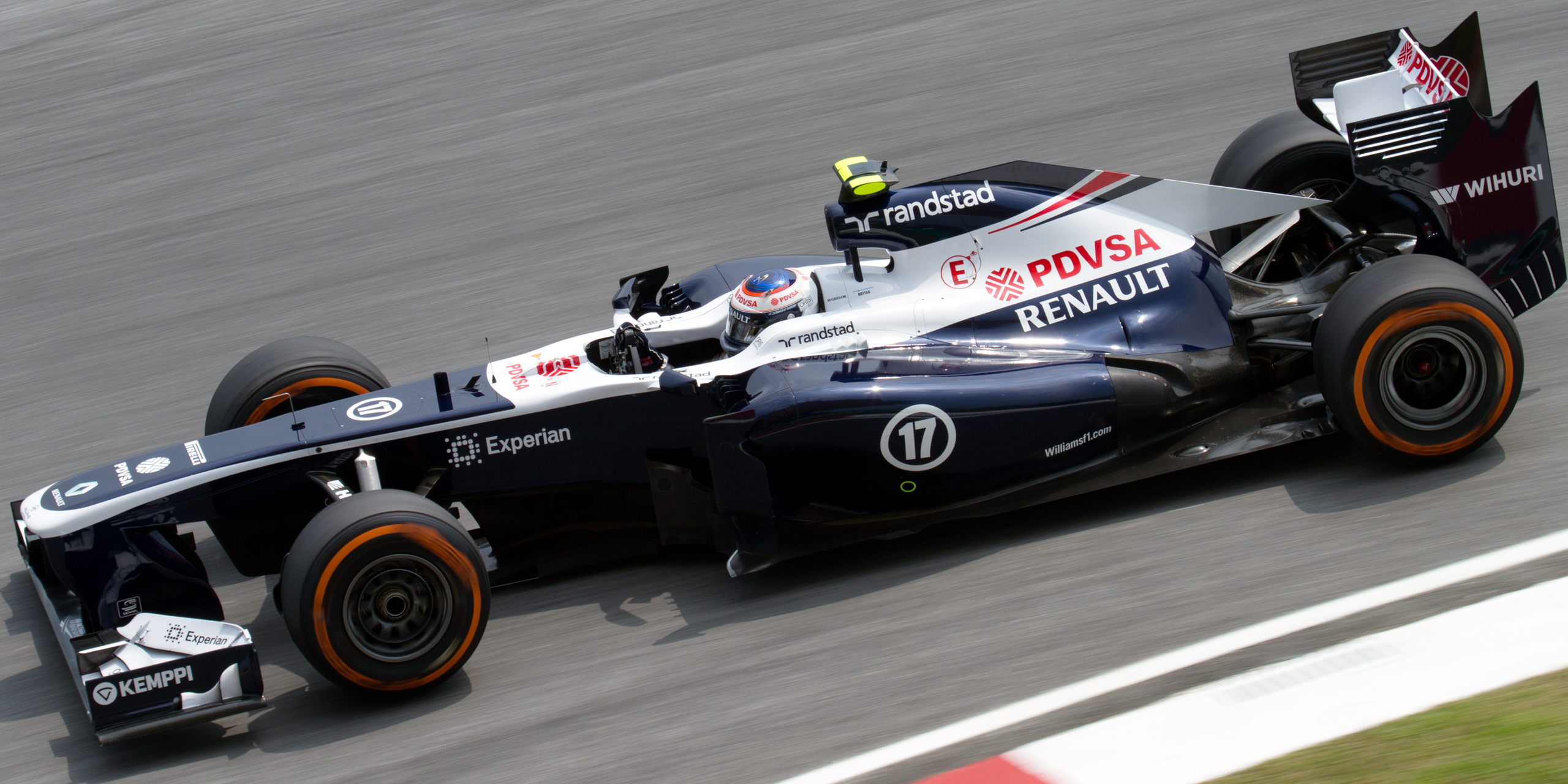
Valtteri Bottas at the 2013 Malaysian Grand Prix

Prior to the 2012 season, Patrick Head moved from the Williams F1 team to Williams Hybrid Power Limited, another subsidiary of Williams Grand Prix Holdings. The team also announced that its relationship with AT&T ended by mutual agreement, and there were negotiations with another telecommunications company for team's title sponsorship. At the 2012 Spanish Grand Prix, Pastor Maldonado took his only Grand Prix victory, which was also Williams's first race victory since 2004 Brazilian Grand Prix. Around 90 minutes after celebrating this win, a fire broke out in the garage of the Williams team, damaging the FW34 of Bruno Senna and leaving several injured. The team eventually achieved eighth position in the Formula One World Constructors' Championship.

Claire Williams, the daughter of team principal Frank Williams, was appointed deputy principal in March 2013. Maldonado was retained by the team for 2013 and was joined by Bottas, promoted from his role as test driver. The team struggled throughout the season, despite a good qualifying session at the Canadian Grand Prix and a place in the top 10 at the United States Grand Prix, scoring only five points in the World Constructors' Championship.

While Williams enjoyed a victory in the 2012 season and occasional points finishes, they did not reach the same heights as was achieved during their domination of Formula One during the 1990s. This, combined with an absolutely dismal 2013 season, prompted Williams to look for a new engine supplier from the 2014 season onwards.

=== Mercedes power units (2014–present) ===
The Williams Martini Racing logo (2014–2018)

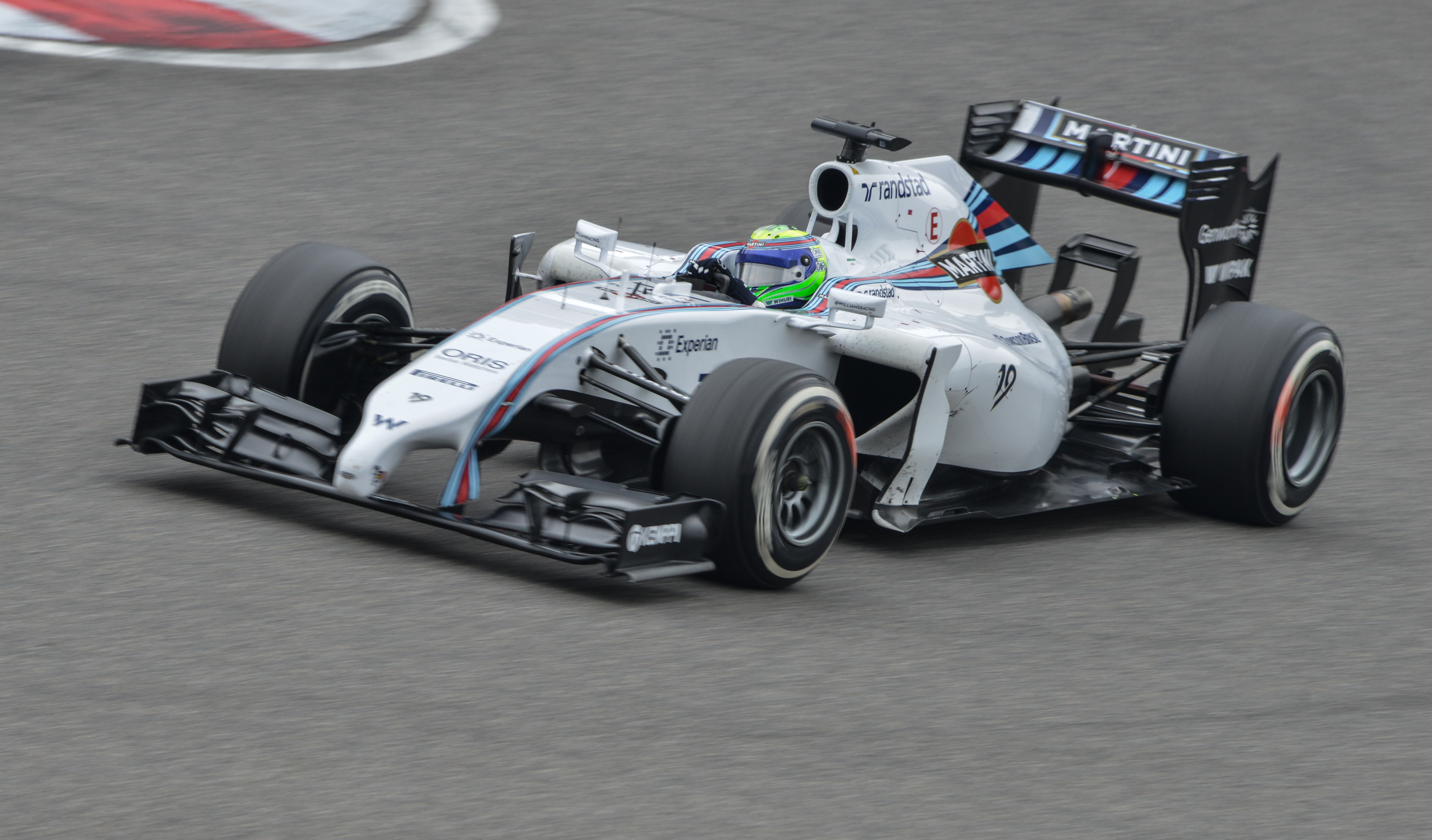
Felipe Massa at the 2014 Chinese Grand Prix

==== 2014–2017 seasons: Initial highs followed by the start of another decline ====
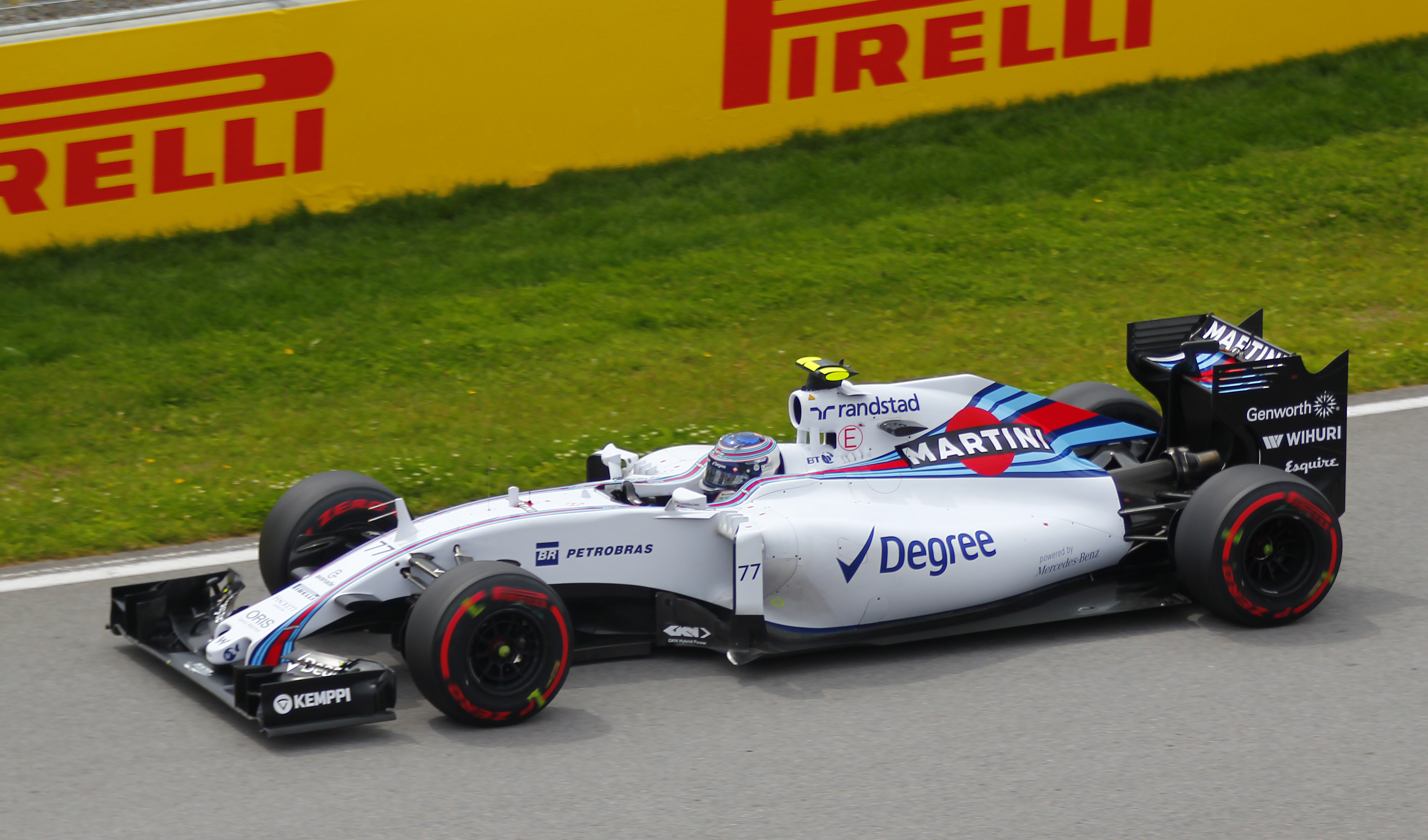
Valtteri Bottas at the 2015 Canadian Grand Prix

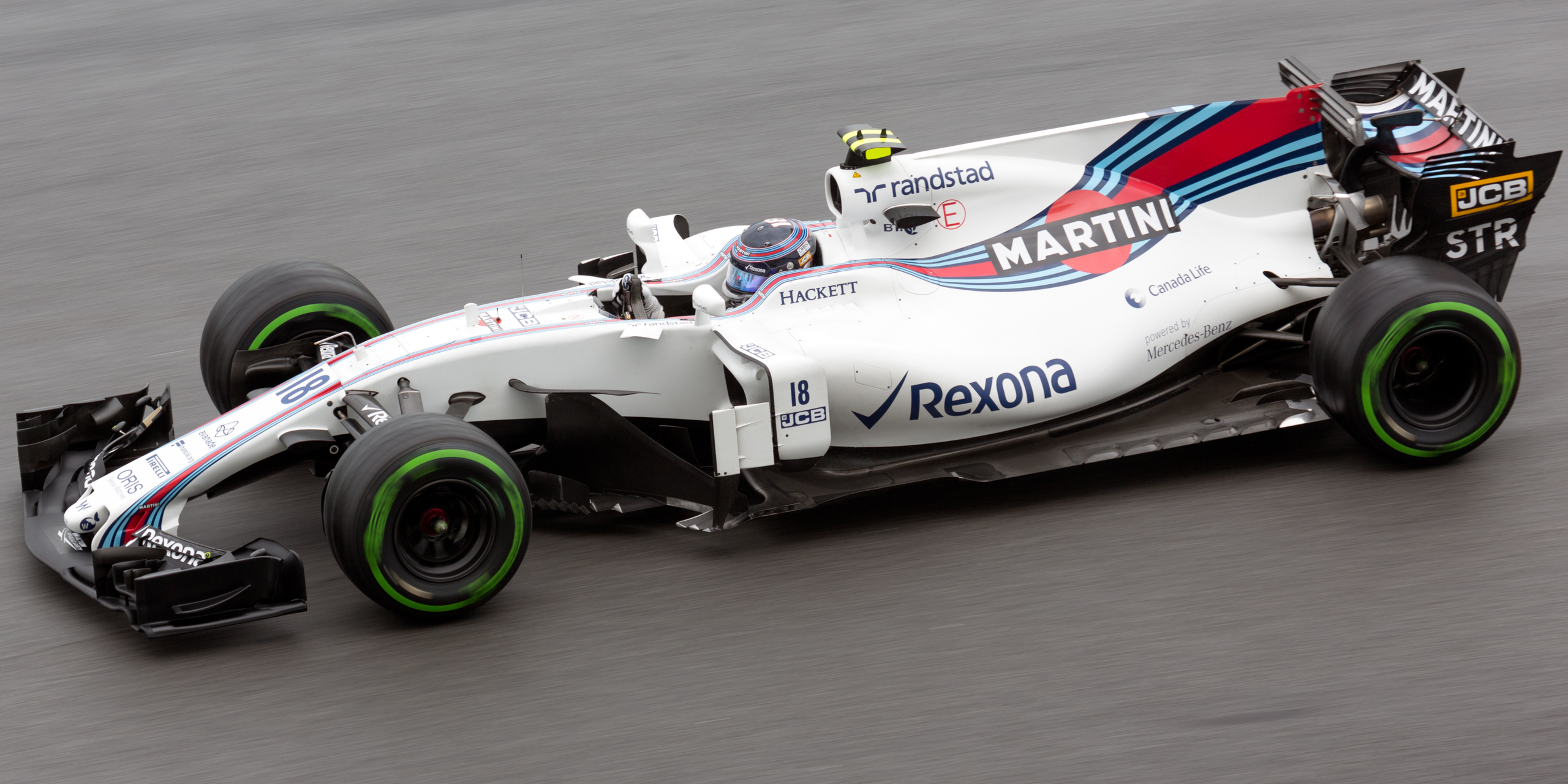
Lance Stroll at the 2017 Malaysian Grand Prix

In May 2013, Williams signed a long-term contract with Mercedes to supply engines for the team, the German manufacturer providing 1.6-litre V6 turbo engines from the start of the 2014 season. Bottas was retained as driver for 2014, and Felipe Massa was signed from Ferrari to replace Maldonado. The team also unveiled a new, multi-year title sponsorship deal with drinks brand Martini.

The team won its first pole position since 2012, courtesy of Massa at the Austrian Grand Prix; it was the only time that Mercedes would be beaten to pole position over the course of the 2014 season. With Bottas qualifying alongside Massa, it was also the first time the team had locked out the front row since the 2003 German Grand Prix. The team enjoyed an upturn in performance, including a double podium in Abu Dhabi, resulting in them taking third place in the Constructors' Championship. They repeated this feat in the 2015 season, despite a low-key season owing to the resurgence of Ferrari.

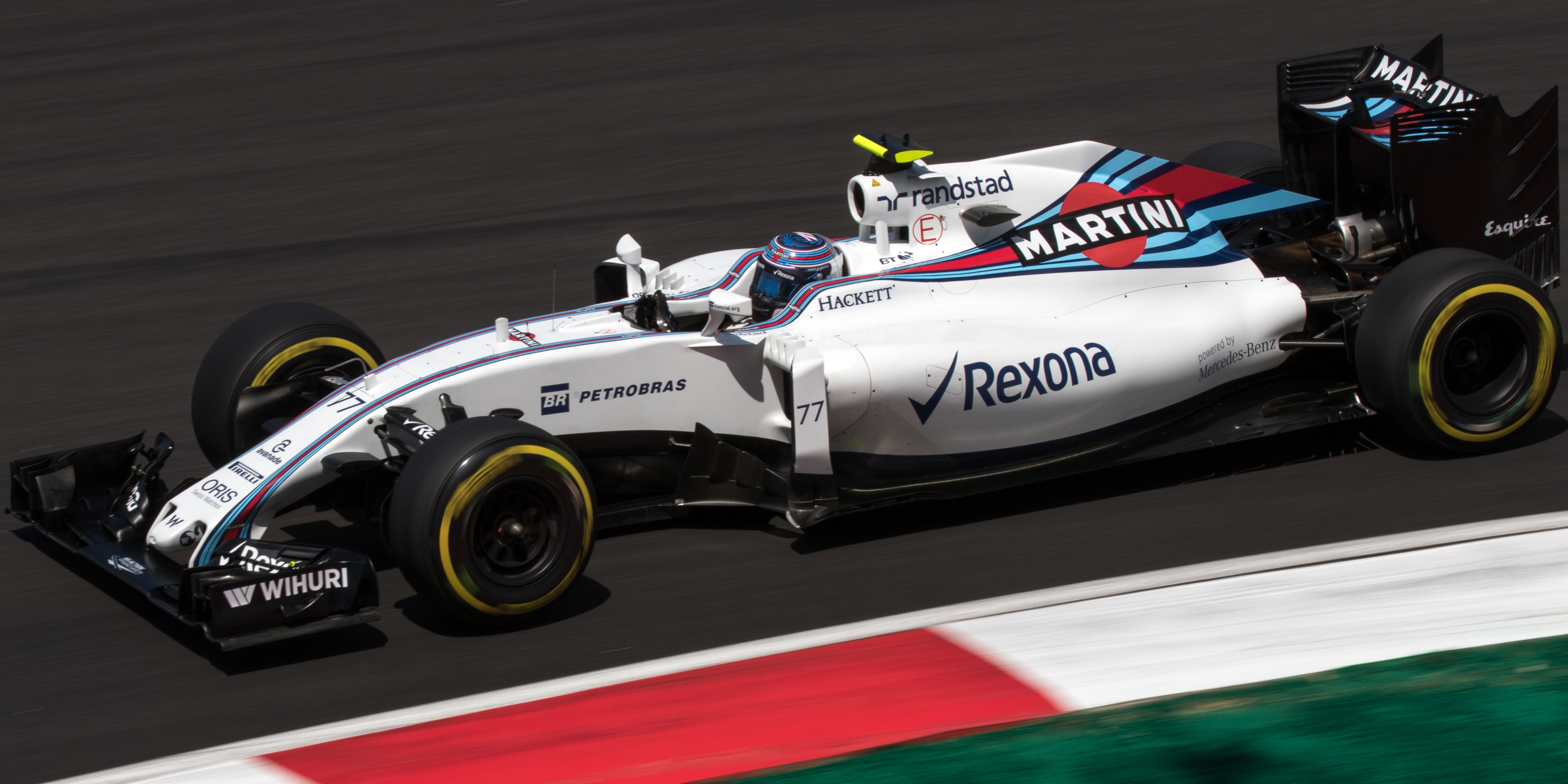
Valtteri Bottas at the 2016 Malaysian Grand Prix

The team went into the 2016 season with Bottas and Massa retained. Former Ferrari Driver Academy member Lance Stroll joined the team as a development driver; Alex Lynn became a reserve driver with Paul di Resta who was announced on 13 March, following Susie Wolff's retirement from motorsport.

In September 2016, Massa announced his intentions to retire from Formula One, with Stroll later announced as his replacement for 2017. Following Nico Rosberg's decision to retire, the team released Bottas from his contract to allow him to take his place at Mercedes, with Massa returning to the team on a one-year deal.

Massa was forced to withdraw from the 2017 Hungarian Grand Prix due to illness; the team then announced that Paul di Resta would be racing alongside Stroll instead.

==== 2018–2019: Continued decline ====
On 4 November 2017, Felipe Massa announced his decision to retire from F1. Renault reserve driver and 2016 GP2 Series 3rd-place finisher Sergey Sirotkin was signed as his replacement for 2018, with Robert Kubica joining the team as a reserve and development driver.

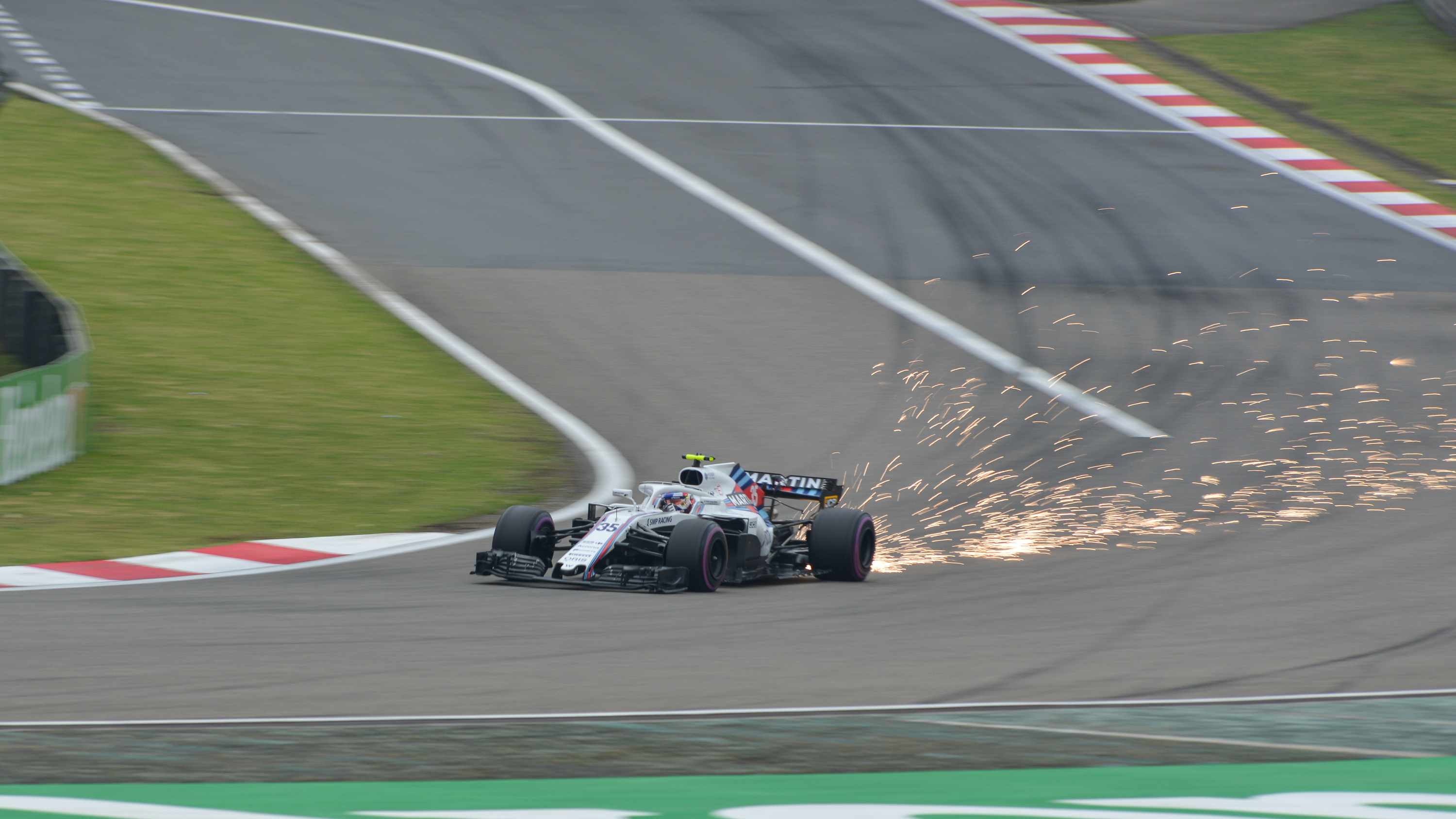
Sergey Sirotkin driving the Williams FW41 at the 2018 Chinese Grand Prix

Williams struggled over the course of the 2018 season, scoring only 7 points and finishing last in the Constructors' Championship standings. Although the FW41 rarely suffered from reliability issues, it was significantly off the pace; the team's highest finish was Stroll's 8th-place finish in Azerbaijan. The team's only other points finish was at the Italian Grand Prix, with Stroll finishing 9th and Sirotkin scoring his first championship point in 10th. This was also the only Grand Prix of the season in which the team reached the third qualifying session, with Stroll starting 10th on the grid.

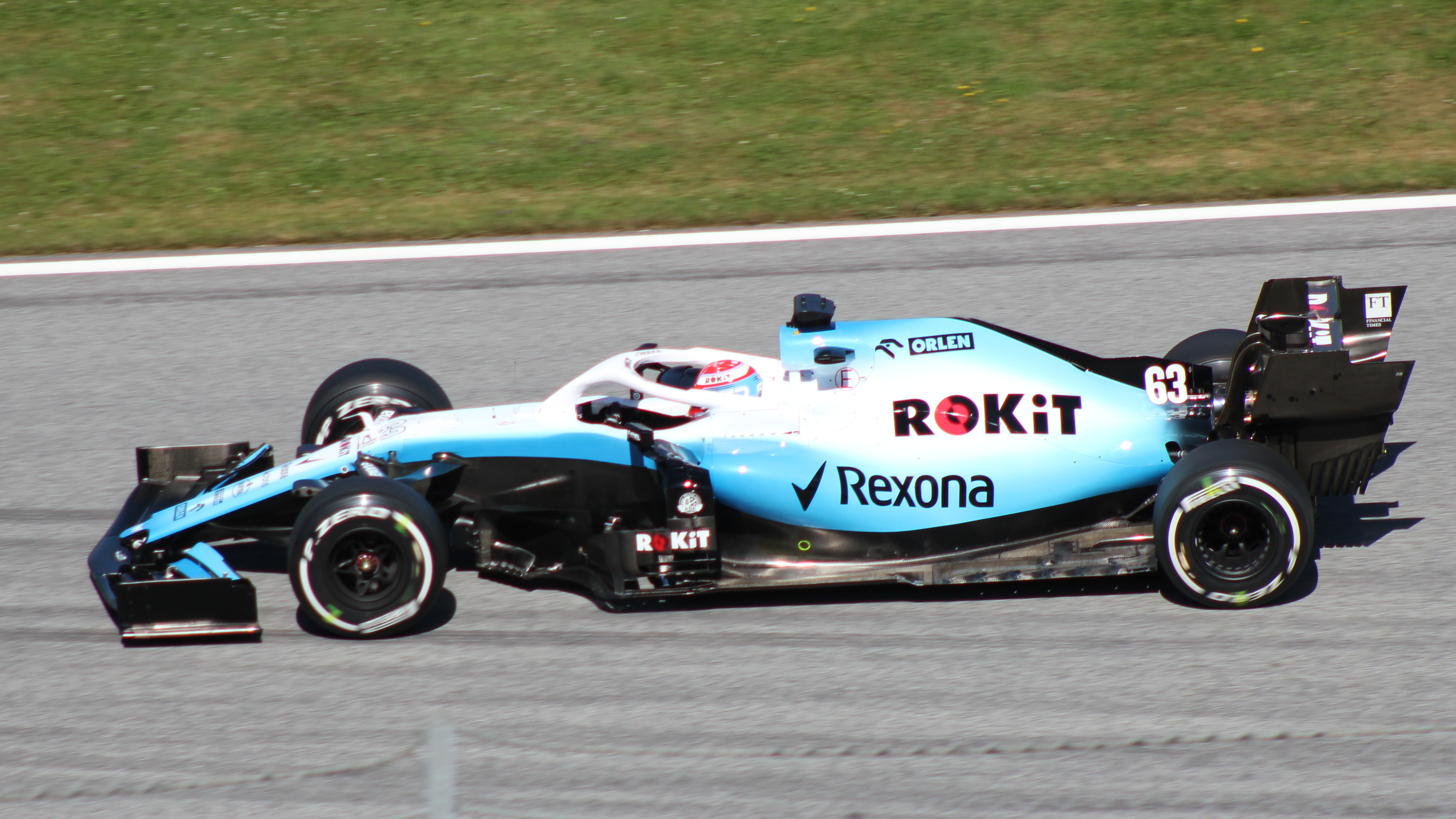
George Russell at the 2019 Austrian Grand Prix

On 27 February 2018, Martini announced that they would leave Williams and Formula One at the end of the 2018 season.

On 12 October 2018, the team announced that reigning Formula 2 champion George Russell would be joining the team for the 2019 season. On 22 November 2018 it was announced that reserve driver Robert Kubica would be promoted to the other seat, marking his return to Formula One after eight years away from the sport due to injury. For the 2019 season, the team entered into a partnership with Polish petroleum company PKN Orlen and a multi-year title sponsorship arrangement with telecommunications company ROKiT.

Williams missed the first two-and-a-half days of pre-season testing in Barcelona due to the FW42 not yet being ready, the only team to suffer such a setback. Williams began the season out of reach from being competitive. During qualifying at the season-opener in Australia, their fastest time was almost 1.3 seconds slower than the nearest competitor. In the race, Russell and Kubica finished two and three laps behind the leader respectively. The team's best result of the season came in Germany, where Kubica was classified 10th, the team's only points finish that season. However, this result only came after post-race penalties for other drivers. Upgrades came during the season with which the FW42 began to catch up to its competitors; Russell came within 0.1 seconds of reaching Q2 in qualifying for the Hungarian Grand Prix and finished close to the points with 12th in Brazil. However, both cars would be eliminated in Q1 at every race of the season. Despite the team's lack of performance in comparison to 2014–2017, it was confirmed that Williams have extended their engine supplier partnership with Mercedes until 2025.

On 19 September 2019, Williams announced that Kubica had decided to leave the team at the end of the 2019 season; he would go on to join Alfa Romeo as a reserve driver. 2019 Formula 2 Championship runner-up Nicholas Latifi was promoted from his role of reserve driver to replace Kubica for the 2020 season. Jack Aitken replaced Latifi as reserve driver. In May 2020, following publication of significant losses in 2019, Williams announced the immediate termination of its title sponsorship deal with ROKiT.

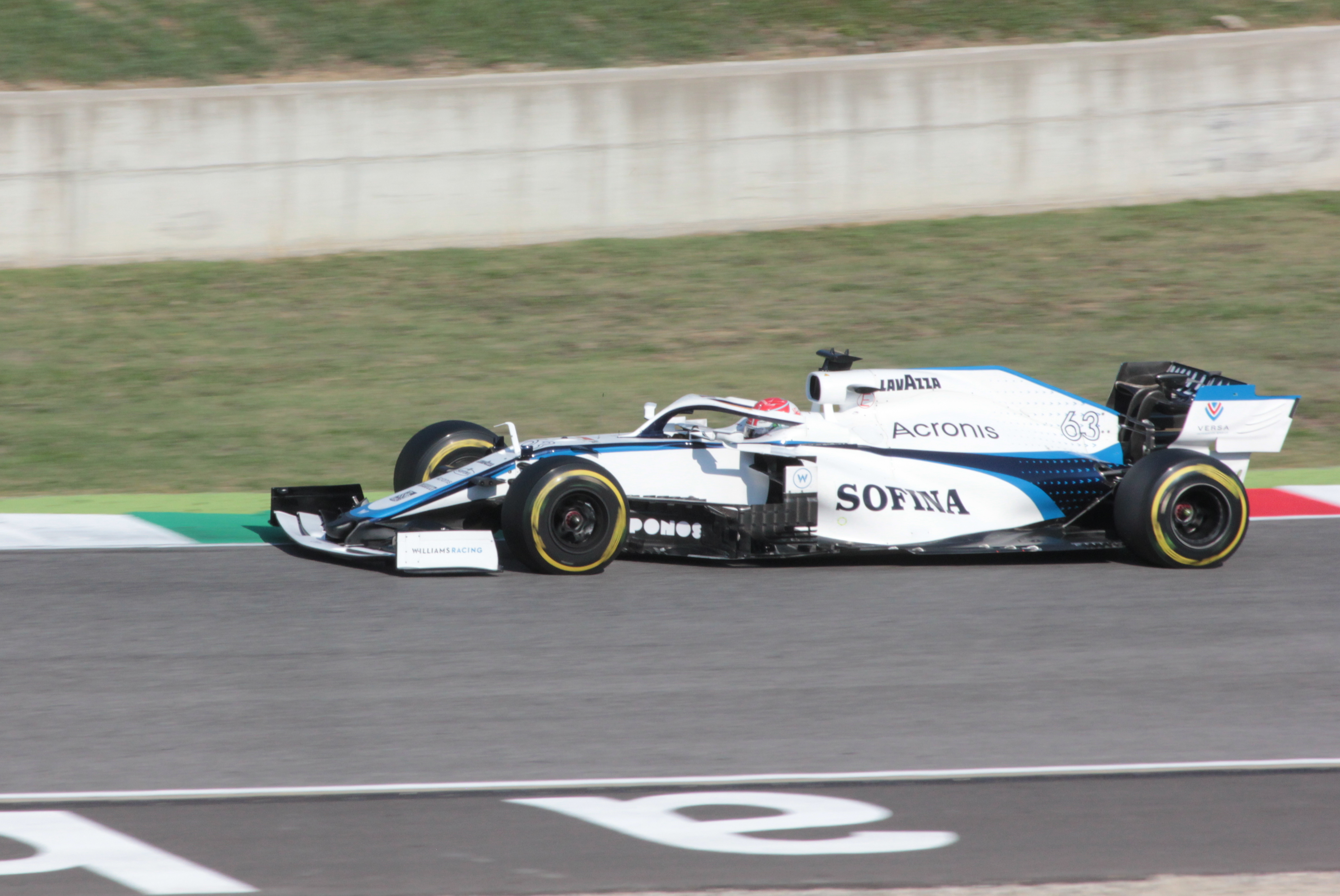
George Russell driving the Williams FW43 at the 2020 Tuscan Grand Prix

==== 2020–2022: Team sale to Dorilton Capital and Capito era ====
In the opening race of 2020, the 2020 Austrian Grand Prix, Latifi reached 11th place, just outside the points, whereas in qualifying Russell was only 0.15 seconds away from reaching Q2 (Russell retired in the race with a fuel pressure issue). In the wet qualifying for the next race, the Styrian Grand Prix, Russell succeeded in making it out of Q1, the first time a Williams driver had done so since the 2018 Brazilian Grand Prix, and, in the slippery conditions, qualified in 12th. Russell started the race in 11th, following the application of penalties for other drivers.

At the 2020 Hungarian Grand Prix, both drivers made it out of Q1 for the first time since the 2018 Italian Grand Prix. It was Russell's second time getting out of Q1, and Latifi's first time getting out of Q1.

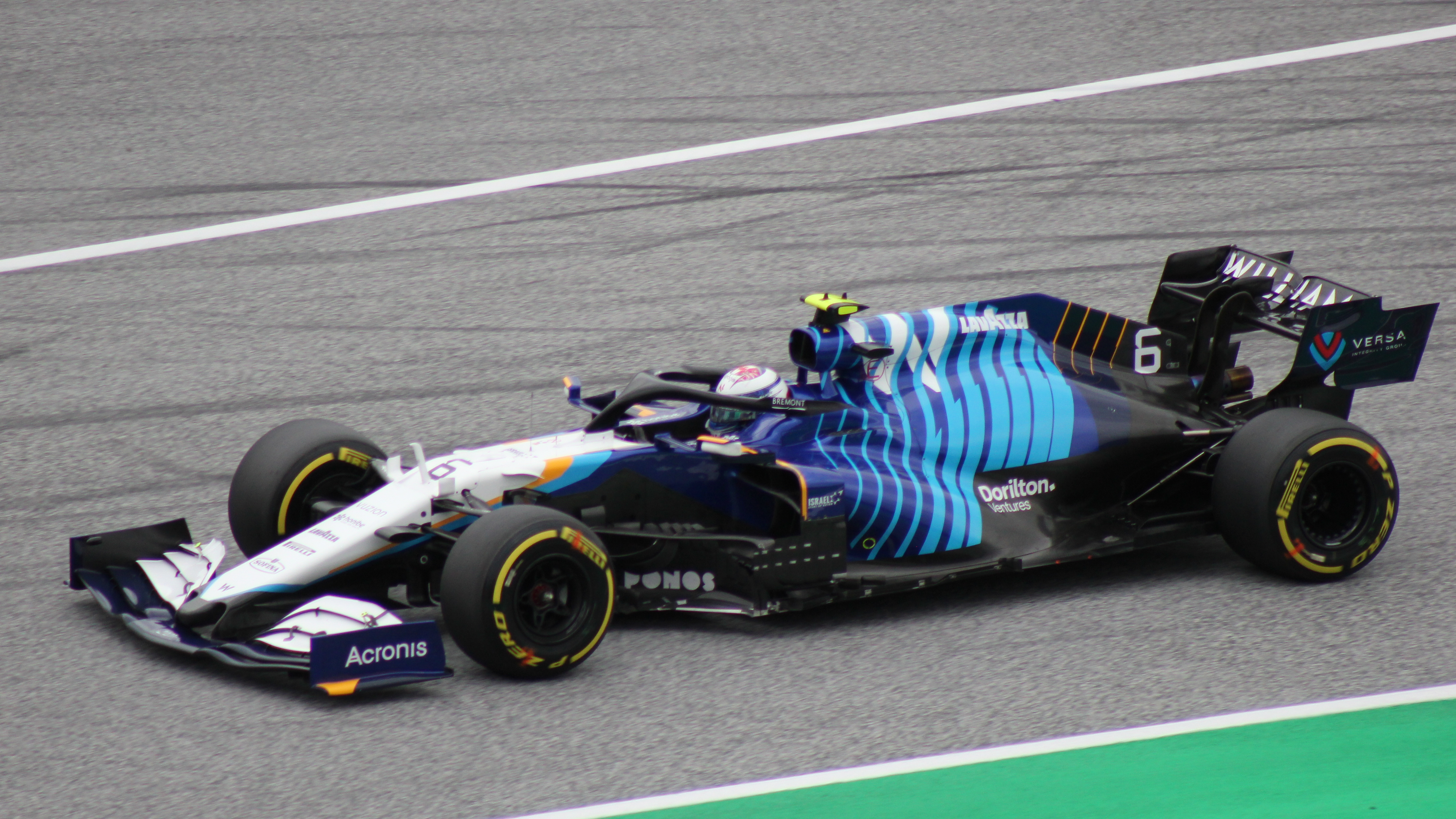
Nicholas Latifi driving Williams FW43B at the 2021 Austrian Grand Prix

On 21 August 2020, Williams was acquired by US investment group Dorilton Capital for €152 million. The amount includes settling the debt of the company and it will continue to run under the Williams name and keep its UK base.

Despite being offered the chance to stay on as Team Principal, Claire Williams announced her departure from the team effective after the weekend of the 2020 Italian Grand Prix. Following this announcement, it will be the first time Williams F1 Team has not been under the leadership of the Williams family since its inception 43 years prior. Simon Roberts, who joined Williams from McLaren in May 2020, became the acting team principal of the team. In December 2020, Williams announced Jost Capito will be joining Williams as the new CEO, with Roberts becoming team principal and reporting to Capito. Williams failed to score a point in the 2020 season that had been disrupted and shortened by the COVID-19 pandemic, making it their first pointless season in 44 years.

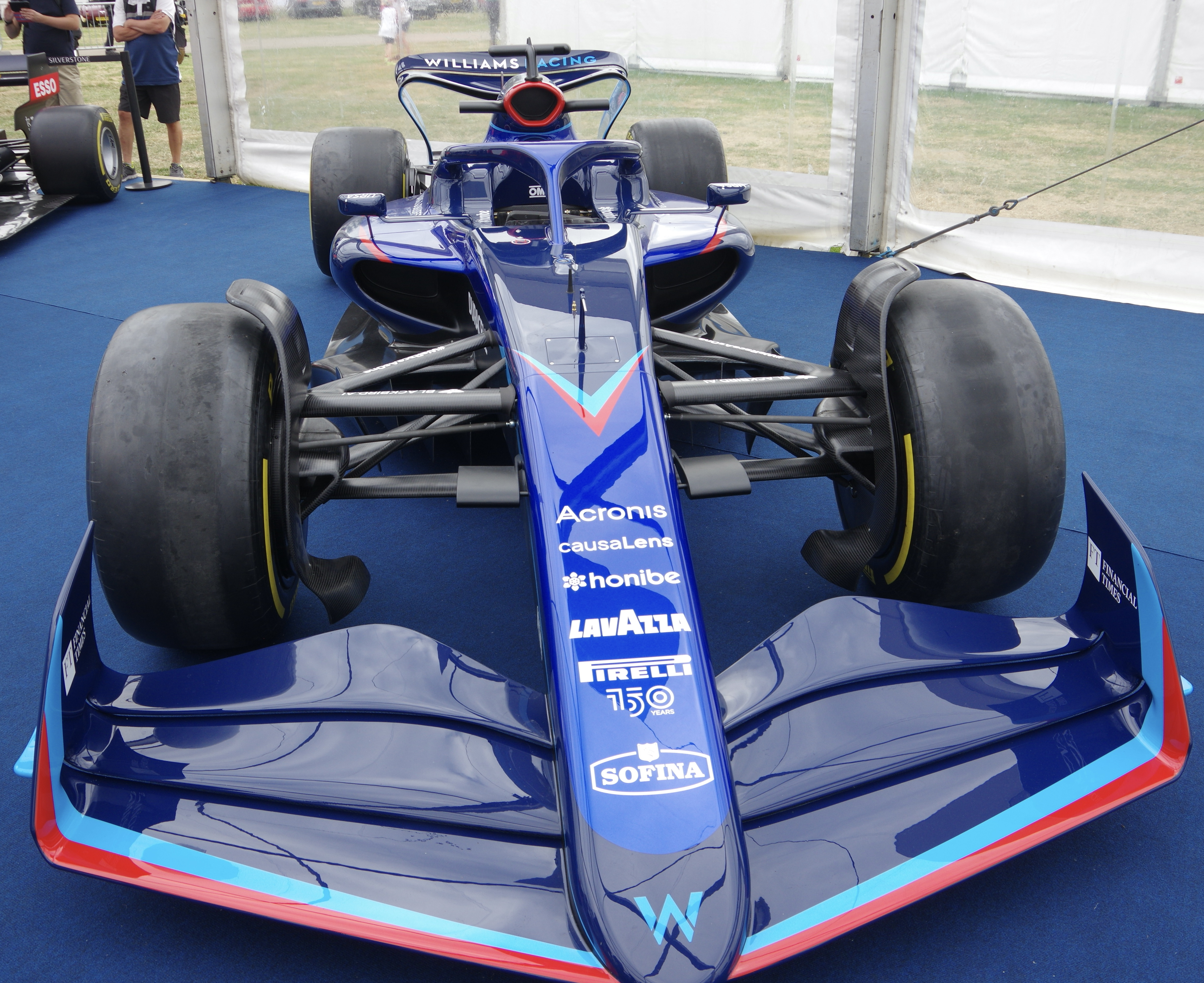
The Williams FW44 at 'The Silverstone Classic'. This car was driven in the 2022 season by Alexander Albon, Nicholas Latifi and Nyck de Vries.

During the 2021 Monaco Grand Prix, Williams celebrated their 750th Grand Prix start. To celebrate the occasion, Williams launched a competition where the names of 100 Williams supporters were featured on their car, the Williams FW43B, together with the number of races since they started supporting Williams. In June 2021, Roberts left the team. Most of his responsibilities were taken over by Capito, with François-Xavier Demaison taking his trackside leadership duties. The 2021 Hungarian Grand Prix saw Williams score their first points since the 2019 German Grand Prix with Robert Kubica, and their first double points finish since the 2018 Italian Grand Prix. At the 2021 Belgian Grand Prix, Russell qualified in 2nd place and scored Williams's first podium since the 2017 Azerbaijan Grand Prix, as the race was stopped after only two laps under safety car conditions were completed, allowing most drivers to retain their qualifying position. The team also achieved a second consecutive double points finish, as Latifi finished 9th. Russell scored back-to-back points at the 2021 Italian Grand Prix and at the 2021 Russian Grand Prix (9th and 10th respectively; in the latter he qualified 3rd, behind Carlos Sainz Jr. and pole-sitter Lando Norris). Williams finished in 8th place in the Constructors' Championship with 23 points, 10 points ahead of Alfa Romeo, which finished in 9th place.

For the 2022 season, Russell left Williams to join the Mercedes works team, whose junior team he had been a part of. Ex-Red Bull driver, Alex Albon, was signed to replace Russell. Latifi retained his spot in the team. Prior to the season, Williams announced a partnership deal with the battery manufacturer Duracell. Albon scored the team's first points of the season in the Australian Grand Prix, where he pitted only once on the last lap and finished tenth. Albon also finished ninth in the Miami Grand Prix. Latifi achieved his first ever Q3 appearance at the British Grand Prix, though he dropped out of the points and finished in twelfth. Following a number of penalties for other drivers at the Belgian Grand Prix, Albon qualified ninth and started sixth. Albon went on to score Williams's third point position finish by ending the race in tenth. Prior to the third practice session at the Italian Grand Prix, Albon withdrew after feeling ill and suffering from appendicitis. Williams announced Nyck de Vries as the replacement. In his first ever qualifying session, de Vries qualified thirteenth, but started eighth after penalties. de Vries went on to finish ninth, scoring points on his debut.

==== 2023–present: Improvements under James Vowles ====
Preceding the start of the 2023 race year, Mercedes ex-chief strategist James Vowles was announced to take over as the Team's new Principal, following the resignation of former Team Principal Jost Capito in 2022.

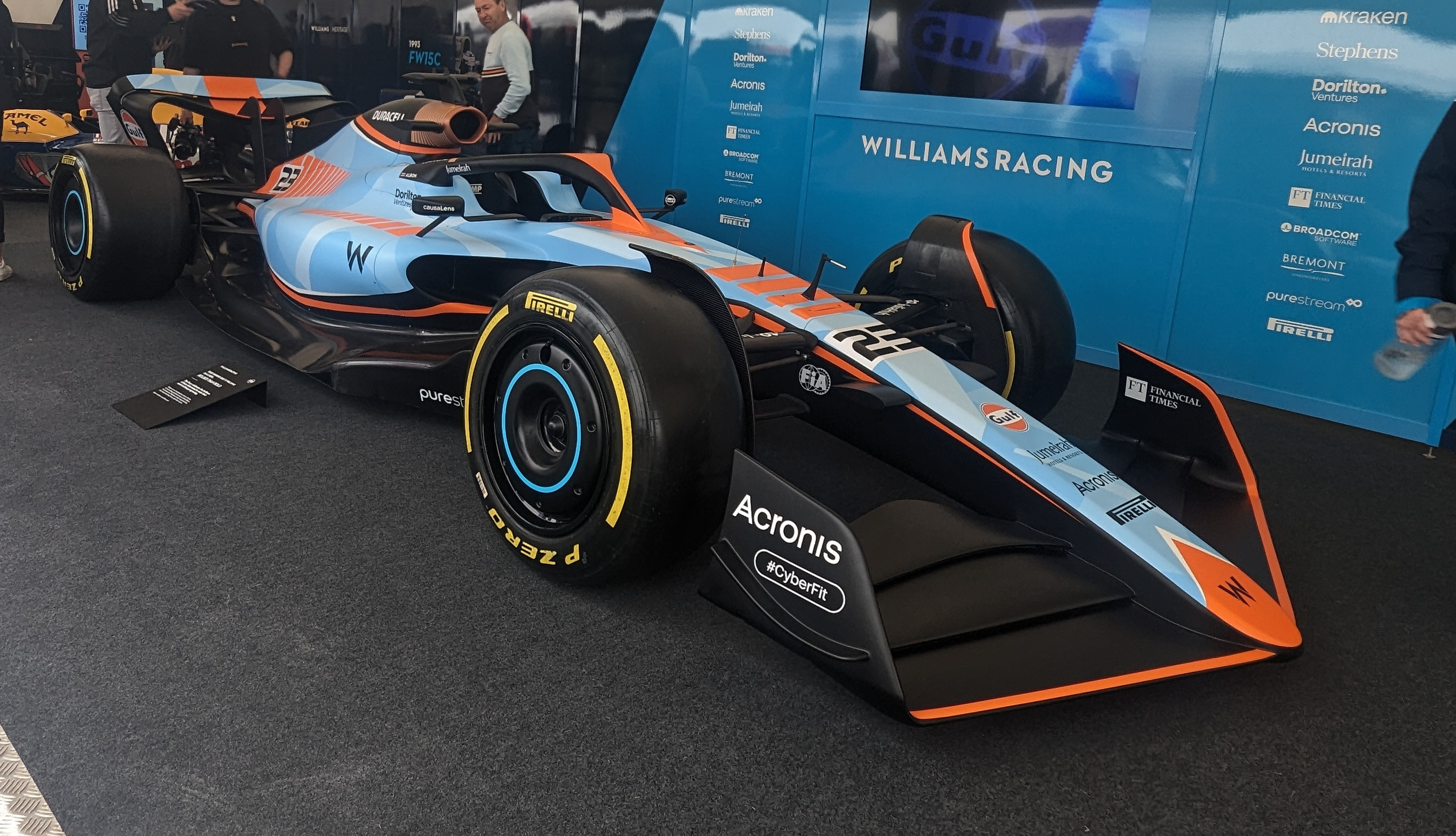
The Williams FW45 featured a special Gulf Oil livery, here displayed on a show car, in 2023. Williams finished 2023 in seventh, finding themselves outside the points in most of the races.

For the 2023 season, Williams announced a long-term partnership with Gulf Oil. Albon's contract had been extended, partnering rookie Logan Sargeant; Sargeant, who replaced the departing Nicholas Latifi, was the first American driver to race in Formula One since Alexander Rossi drove for the former Marussia F1 team for five races in 2015. Sargeant scored his first, and ultimately only, point at the 2023 United States Grand Prix, attributed to two disqualifications. The season-opener of the Bahrain Grand Prix saw Albon score one point in tenth ahead of Sargeant, who finished twelfth. Albon retired at the following race at the Saudi Arabian Grand Prix due to a brake failure with Sargeant placing sixteenth after he failed to set a time within the 107% rule in qualification due to mechanical issues. In the Australian Grand Prix, Albon retired again after losing control of his car and crashing heavily early into the race, causing a red flag. Sargeant, meanwhile, crashed with AlphaTauri driver Nyck de Vries during lap 56 of 58 after a restart. However, Sargeant was classified as having finished 16th, given that he had completed more than 90% of the race distance.

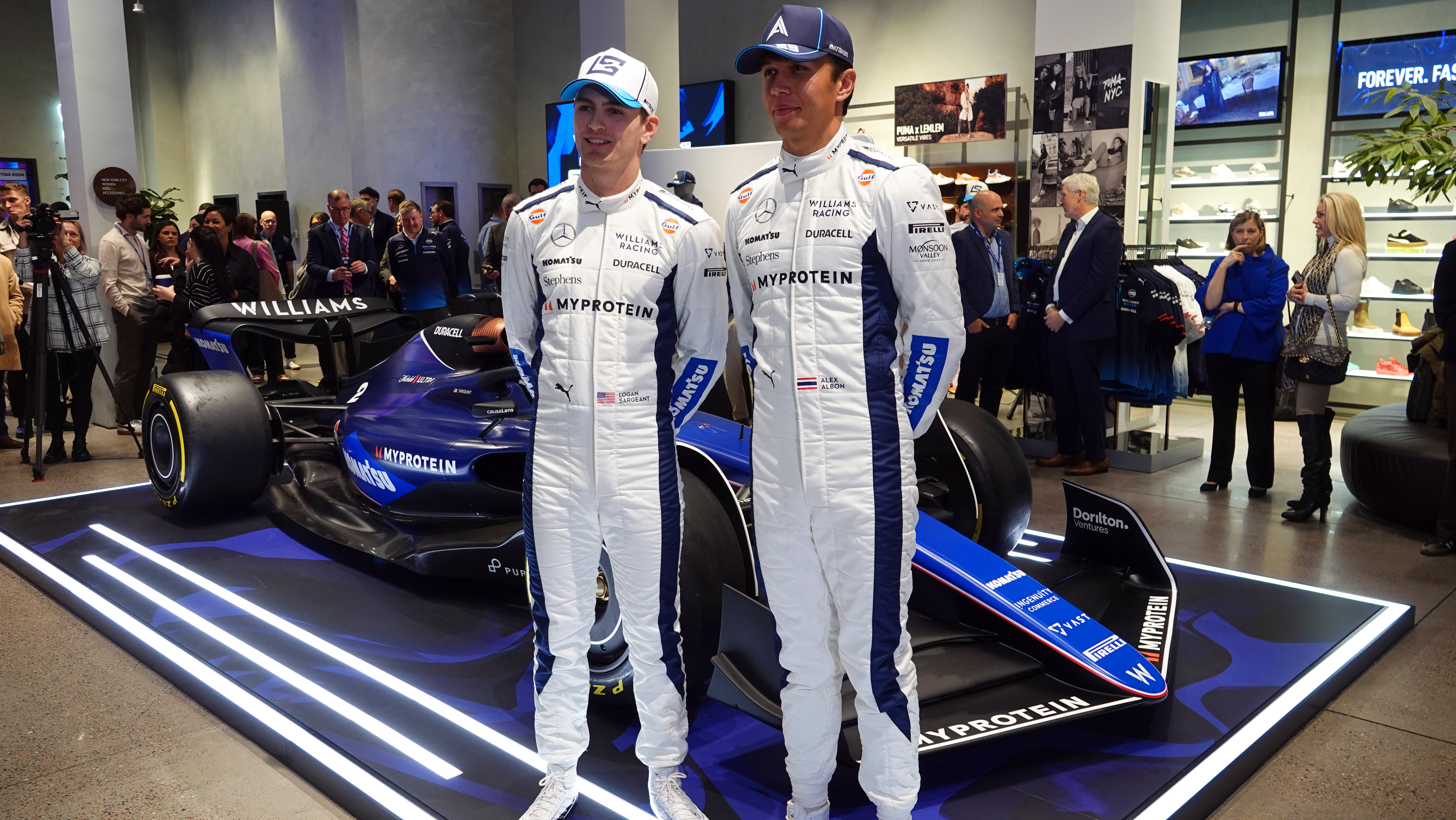
Williams Racing's Alex Albon and Logan Sargeant at the 2024 season launch at the Puma Flagship Store in New York City. Sargeant was dropped mid-season after prolonged underperformance.

Albon and Sargeant were retained for the 2024 season. The latter was due to be replaced by Carlos Sainz Jr. in the 2025 season. However, Sargeant was released after the 2024 Dutch Grand Prix due to his underperformances and his crash in the third practice section. His replacement, from the 2024 Italian Grand Prix to the end of the season, was current Formula 2 driver and Williams Driver Academy member Franco Colapinto, who would become the first Argentine driver to compete in F1 since Gastón Mazzacane in 2001. Following the conclusion of the 2024 season, Colapinto returned to his role as reserve driver, until he was signed by Alpine in 2025.

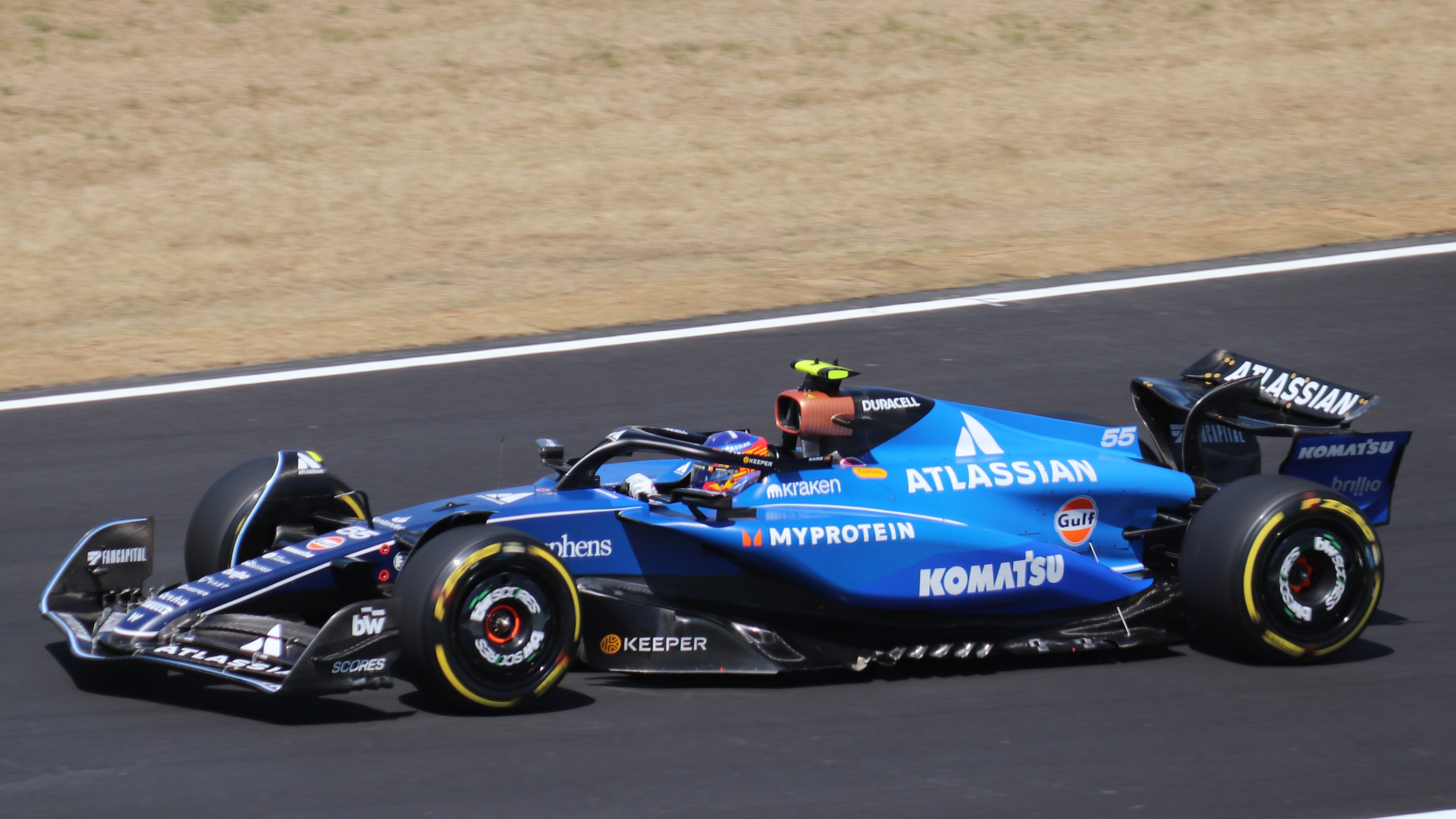
Carlos Sainz Jr. drives the Williams FW47 at the 2025 Japanese Grand Prix. The Williams package was vastly improved compared to previous seasons, and the team finished fifth in the Constructors' Championship.

In February 2025, Williams announced a record multi-year title sponsorship with Atlassian and have entered the 2025 season as Atlassian Williams Racing. Williams found themselves much more competitive than other seasons, with new signee Sainz scoring Williams' first podium since 2021 at the Azerbaijan Grand Prix, and the team's first sprint race podium at the United States Grand Prix.

Logo set to be used from the 2026 season

Near the end of the season, the team announced it will rebrand as Atlassian Williams F1 Team from the 2026 season onwards. According to Head of Creative Design Ed Scott, the rebranding was partially due to the Williams Racing name being confused for horse racing. In January 2026, Williams announced that they will miss the pre-season shakedown test due to delays completing the FW48 with the new regulations.

== Williams Group ==
Williams Grand Prix Holdings is the public company of Williams Group, which includes the Formula One Team and others like Williams Heritage, Williams Grand Prix Technologies (WGPT), and collaborations with other brands. It was also the former parent company of Williams Hybrid Power & Williams Advanced Engineering. Both of these businesses took technology developed for F1 and adapted it for multiple commercial applications. Williams Hybrid Power was sold to GKN in March 2014 and Williams Advanced Engineering was sold to Fortescue in February 2022.

Williams Grand Prix Holdings is currently owned by Dorilton Capital who purchased the team on 21 August 2020. With the acquisition, Claire Williams was offered the chance to stay on as a team principal but that offer was declined. The 2020 Italian Grand Prix in Monza was the last race where the Williams family led the team.

The sale happened after years of financial difficulties. Reuters reported on 20 November 2009 that founders Sir Frank Williams and Patrick Head had sold a minority stake in the team to an investment company led by Toto Wolff. In February 2011, Williams F1 announced plans to raise capital through an initial public offering (IPO) on the Frankfurt Stock Exchange (FWB) in March 2011, with Sir Frank Williams remaining the majority shareholder and team principal after the IPO.

In December 2017 Sir Frank Williams owned 51.3% of the company, with 24.1% on the public marketplace, Brad Hollinger owning 11.7%, Patrick Head 9.3%, and 3.6% is held by an employee trust fund. However, in May 2020, Williams was put up for sale after posting a £13 million loss in the previous year.

=== Williams Heritage ===
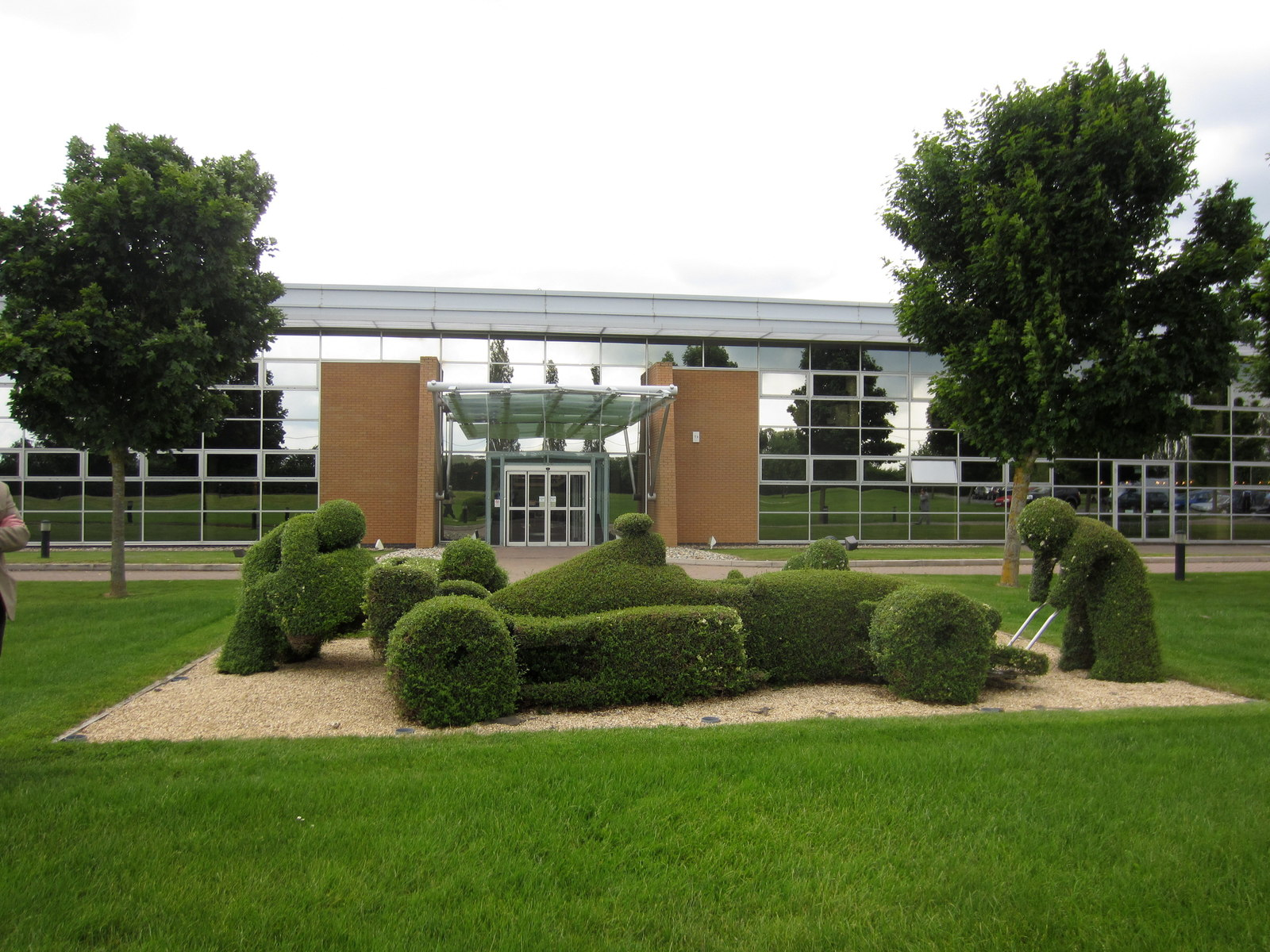
Williams Conference Centre in Grove

Williams Heritage (WH) is the retired chassis and restoration division of Williams F1 (similar to Ferrari F1 Clienti and Classic Team Lotus) that keeps and maintains old retired Williams Formula One chassis that are no longer in racing use. The division's headquarters are located at the Formula One team's site in Grove, Oxfordshire. Williams Heritage manage the restorations, maintenance and on-track activities of the entire Williams collection, as well as privately owned Williams cars. The division was created by Jonathan Williams and the current Heritage Director is Jonathan Kennard.

=== Williams Grand Prix Technologies ===
Williams Grand Prix Technologies (WGPT) was launched in April 2024, and the company applies the innovation and technologies of F1 to tackling clients' engineering challenges in other sectors. Services, capabilities and assets originally developed for and used by the Williams race team are offered by WGPT to a range of sectors that include the wider motorsport sector, premium automotive, aerospace, defence, marine, energy, sport and lifestyle.

Services offered by WGPT include F1 standard platform dynamics, advanced materials, simulation and modelling, and instrument and data analytics. These core engineering services are supported by a range of in-house prototype testing and evaluation resources that include a wind tunnel, a driver-in-the-loop simulator, single-axis testing machines, an 8-post rig, chassis rig, and bedplate testing.

=== Williams Driver Academy ===
Like most F1 teams, Williams operates its own driver academy. As of 2025, the Williams Driver Academy's roster is Jamie Chadwick and Luke Browning.

Former drivers include Franco Colapinto, Logan Sargeant, Lance Stroll, Oliver Rowland, Nicholas Latifi, Dan Ticktum, and Jack Aitken. Both Colapinto and Stroll are driving in Formula One as of the 2026 season, while Sargeant, Latifi, and Aitken are the other four members to drive in the sport.

=== Williams Experience Centre ===
The Williams Experience Centre is located at the home of the Williams Formula 1 team in Grove, Oxfordshire. Originally the base of BMW's Le Mans project, the building was converted in 2002.

== Other motorsports activities ==
=== Formula Two ===
Williams developed the car for the revived Formula Two championship, beginning in 2009. The design was originally created for a new, more-powerful offshoot of the Formula Palmer Audi series, however the car was re-purposed when Jonathan Palmer's MotorSport Vision successfully bid for the rights to run the new Formula Two series.

=== Group B rallying (1985–1986) ===
The MG Metro 6R4 rally car was developed by Williams in 1984 on commission from Rover. The rally car was a MG Metro with a completely new V6 engine (mid-engined) and four-wheel drive, developed to the international Group B rallying regulations. Williams developed the car in just six months.

=== British Touring Car Championship (1995–1999) ===
Williams entered the British Touring Car Championship in 1995, taking over the works Renault programme. Alain Menu transferred from Renault Dealer Racing, with Will Hoy signed to partner him. Williams employed Ian Harrison, future director of Triple Eight Racing as team manager. While Menu was a championship contender, Hoy had constant failures and bad luck during the first half of the season. However, Hoy's luck changed and he won three races and scored several podium finishes in the second half of the year, eventually taking fourth in the championship while Menu finished second in the championship with seven wins. Renault won the manufacturers championship. 1996 was a more difficult year with the front-wheel-drive cars outclassed by the 4WD Audi A4s of Frank Biela and John Bintcliffe. Menu was second in the championship again, while Hoy finished a lowly ninth. 1997 was a breakthrough year for Williams, winning the drivers' championship with Menu, the manufacturers' trophy and teams' award. Other changes for the team saw Jason Plato replacing Hoy, taking third in the championship. The team won 15 races out of 24 in 1997. It also competed in the 1997 Bathurst 1000 with Menu and Plato leading for much of the early part of the race. Alan Jones drove the second car, his first appearance for Williams since 1981.

1998 saw few changes to the Williams team: the driver line-up was unchanged with Menu to defend his title alongside Plato, but the main sponsor for 1998 was Nescafé, with Renault still putting sponsorship in for the team. While the Renaults had a new look for 1998, the opposition had caught up after 1997, and both Menu and Plato had a more difficult season, finishing fourth and fifth in the championship. In the final round of 1998 at Silverstone, a third car was entered for Independents Champion Tommy Rustad. Renault ultimately finished third in the manufacturers trophy and second in the teams championship. 1999 was the most difficult season for Williams, as Menu left Renault after racing with the manufacturer since 1993. Plato was joined by Jean-Christophe Boullion. Nescafé were again the main sponsor for the Williams team in 1999. Renault did not have much luck in 1999 with engine failures haunting the team during the mid-part of the season. One win for Plato was the only success for the season, and Renault pulled out of the BTCC at the end of the season.

=== Le Mans 24 Hours and Sportscars (1998–2000) ===
Prior to their F1 partnership, Williams Motorsport built Le Mans Prototypes for BMW, known as the V12 LM and V12 LMR. The V12 LMR won the 24 Hours of Le Mans in 1999. The car was driven by Pierluigi Martini, Yannick Dalmas and Joachim Winkelhock, and operated by Schnitzer Motorsport under the name of BMW Motorsport.

=== Formula E ===
Williams's Advanced Engineering division collaborated with Jaguar Racing in its debut season. Williams had a contract to supply the battery system for the Gen3 Car from the 2021–22 Formula E World Championship.

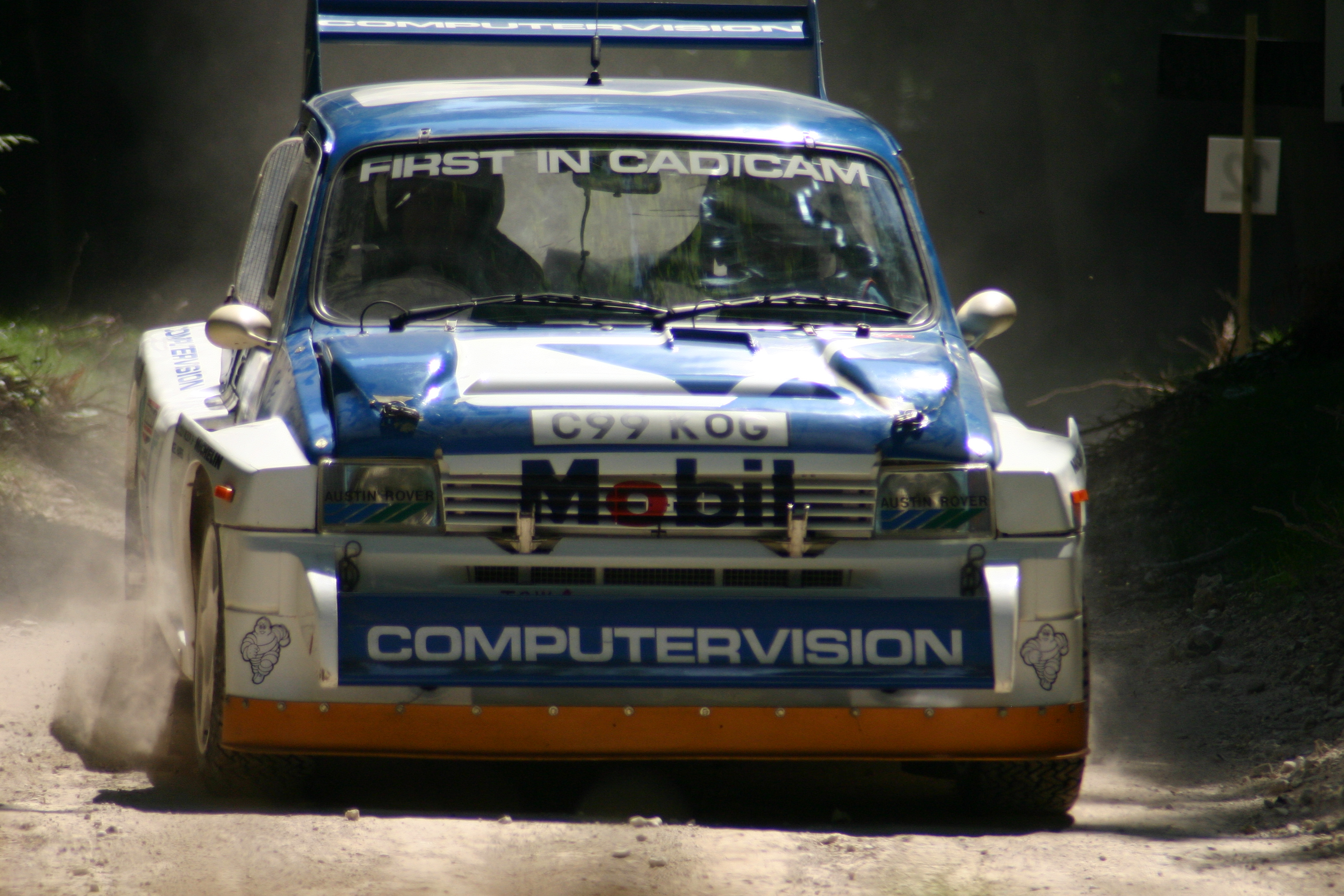
The MG Metro 6R4 was developed by Williams for the 1986 World Rally Championship.

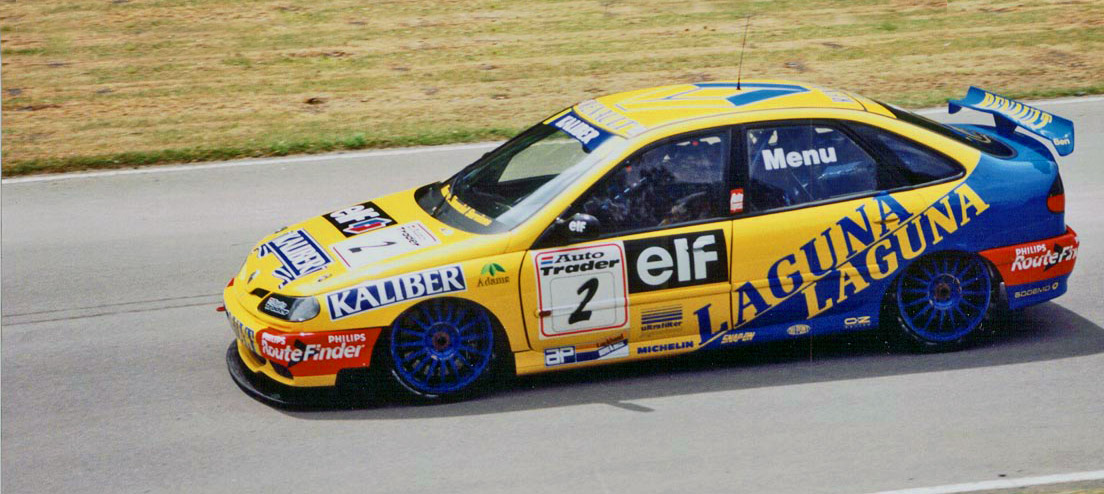
The Williams-engineered Renault Laguna BTCC car ran between 1995 and 1999 and won two manufacturers' titles and one drivers' title.

== Automobile activities ==
=== Jaguar C-X75 ===
In May 2011 Jaguar announced a limited production of the C-X75 from 2013 to 2015, with a compact, forced induction petrol engine combined with electric motors instead of the micro gas turbines in the concept car. A maximum of 250 cars were planned to be built in partnership with Williams Advanced Engineering. The Jaguar C-X75 is a hybrid-electric, 2-seat, concept car produced by British automobile manufacturer Jaguar Cars in partnership with the derivative of the Formula One team, Williams Advanced Engineering which debuted at the 2010 Paris Motor Show.

=== Renault Clio Williams ===
The Williams name and logo were used on the Renault Clio Williams, a limited sports model of the production supermini, which was Formula One's safety car at the 1996 Argentine Grand Prix. However, no input was provided by Williams into the development of the car.

=== Porsche 911 GT3R Hybrid ===
In 2010, through subsidiary Williams Hybrid Power, the company developed and supplied a flywheel-based kinetic-energy storage system for a variant of the Porsche 911 GT3 R, entered in various GT racing series. The car achieved its first victory on 28 May 2011 at the 4th round of the VLN Endurance Racing Championship held at the Nürburgring.

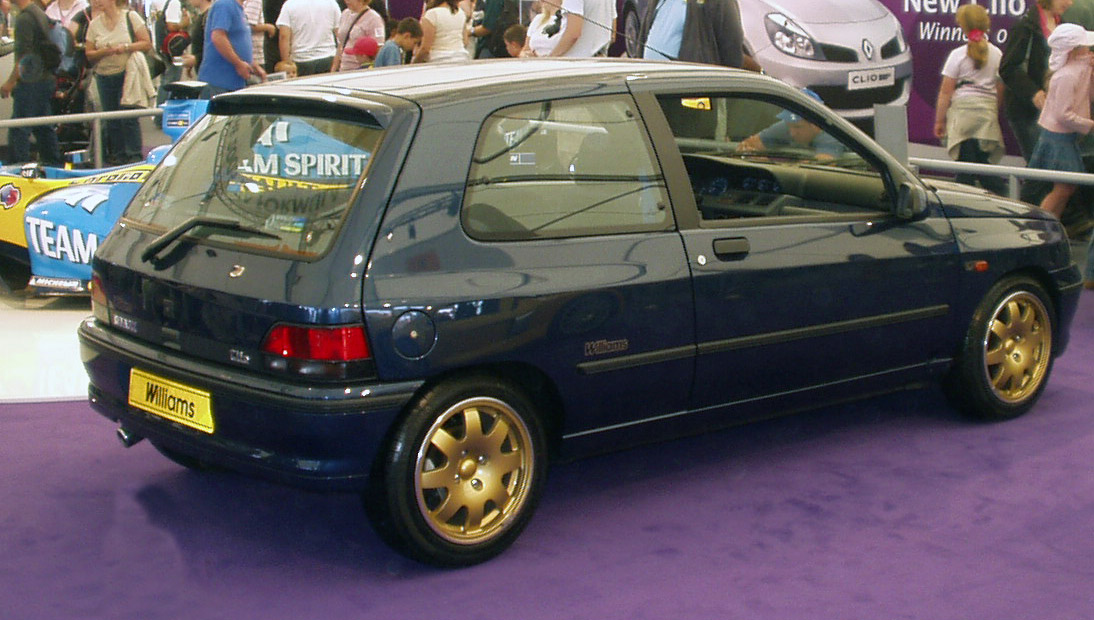
The Renault Clio Williams

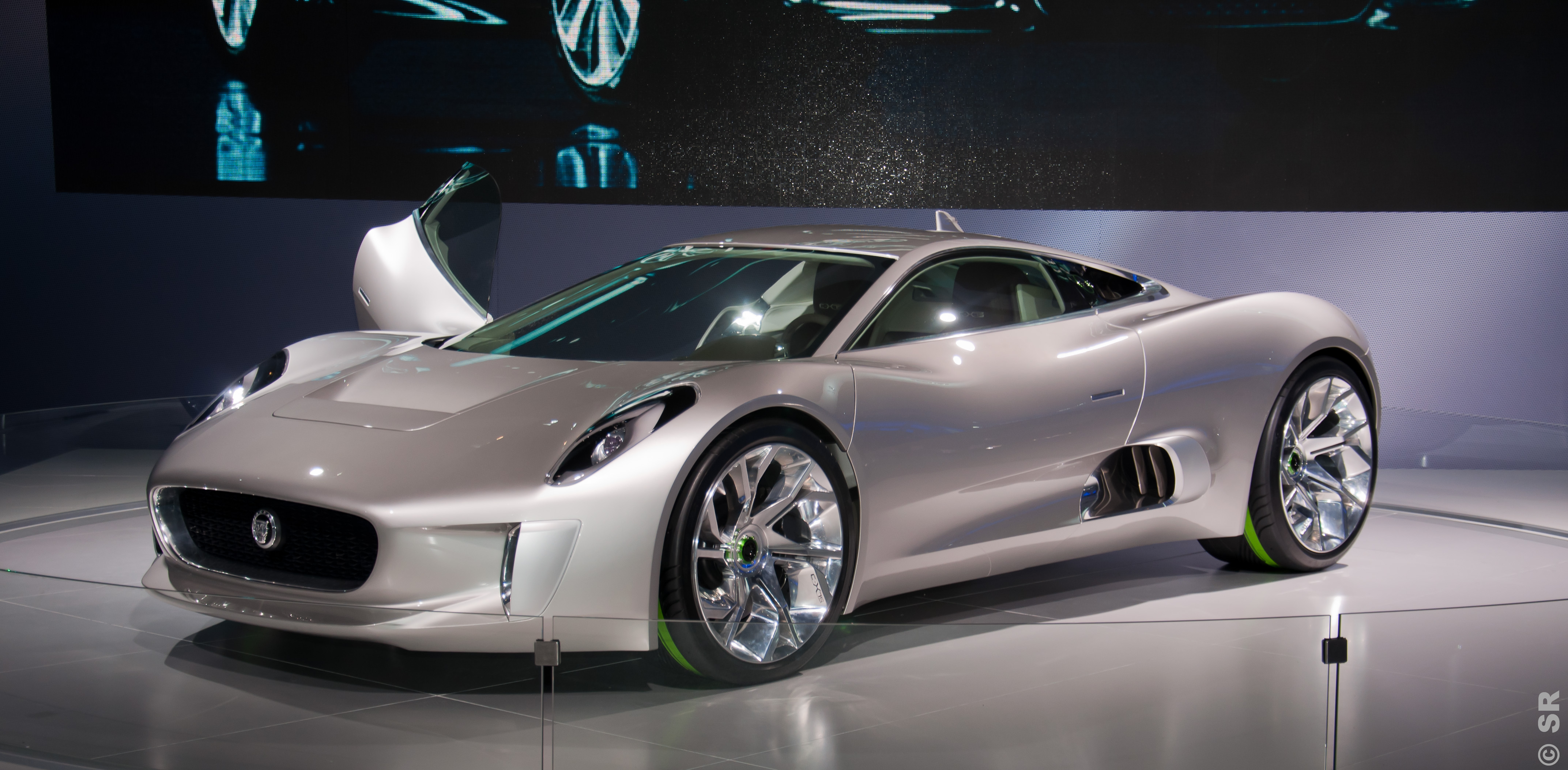
Jaguar C-X75

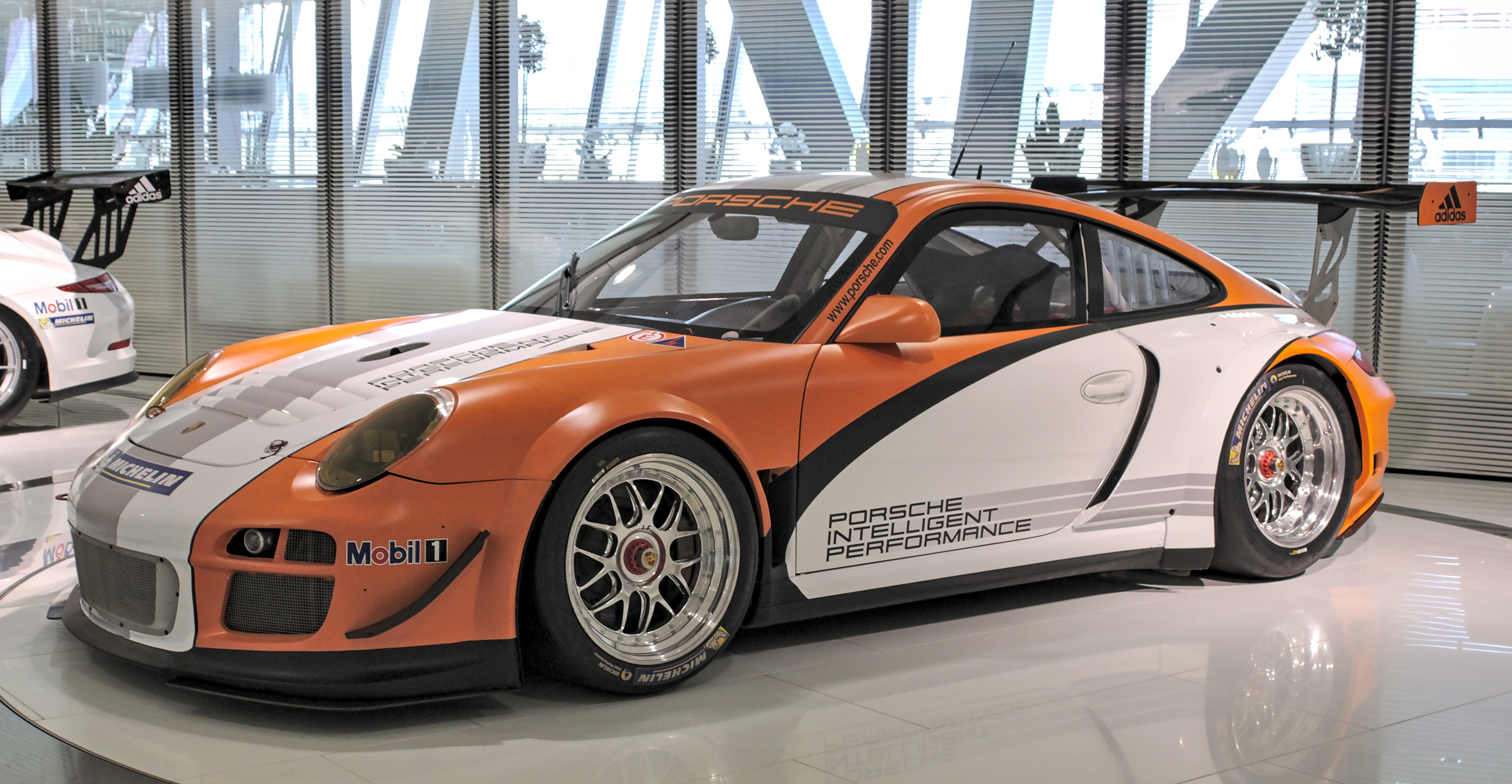
Porsche 911 GT3 R Hybrid

== Former subsidiaries ==
=== WAE Technologies ===
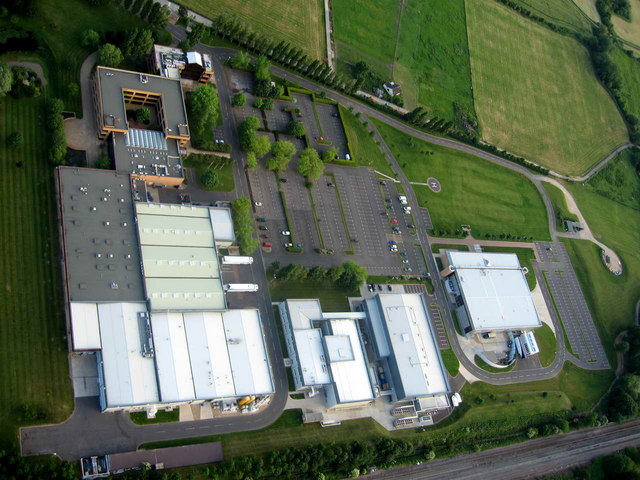
Aerial view of the Williams F1 factory in Grove, Oxfordshire, England

WAE Technologies, formerly known as Williams Advanced Engineering (WAE), was the technology and engineering services business of the Williams Group. Based in the United Kingdom, it is located in a dedicated facility of 3,800 square metres (41,000 sq ft), adjacent to Williams Formula One facilities.

The company provides the battery technology used in Formula E and Extreme E, and has assisted the development of the electric Vanda Electric Dendrobium car from Singapore. It has worked with Jaguar to create the C-X75 hybrid supercar. WAE partnered once again with Jaguar to build new stunt C-X75s for the 24th James Bond film, Spectre.

WAE announced in June 2013 a new collaboration with Nismo, the performance-orientated brand of Nissan, to partner in the development of high-performance road cars.

WAE generated revenues of £10.9m in fiscal year 2014–15, with profits of £1m.

The company announced in August 2017 a collaboration with Singer Vehicle Design. The initial work is a modified, naturally aspirated, air-cooled, flat-six Porsche 911 engine with a 4.0L capacity, four valves per cylinder and four camshafts, rated at 500HP.

On 1 May 2019, Williams Advanced Engineering announced their partnership with the FIA sanctioned electric off-road racing series, Extreme E. Williams Advanced Engineering will supply the batteries for the first two seasons of Extreme E, which began in 2021.

On 2 May 2019, it was announced that Williams Advanced Engineering will supply the batteries for the multi-make ETCR series that is due to launch in 2020.

On 24 January 2022, the Australian mining firm Fortescue announced it had purchased Williams Advanced Engineering for £164m in an effort to meet its carbon neutral targets for 2030. In January 2023, the company was renamed WAE Technologies. In June 2024, the company was renamed again as Fortescue Zero.

=== Williams Hybrid Power ===
Williams Hybrid Power (WHP) was the division of Williams F1 that developed electromechanical flywheels for mobile applications such as buses, trams and high-performance endurance-racing cars. A hybrid system that uses a spinning composite rotor to store energy, these flywheels help a vehicle save fuel and ultimately reduce its CO_{2} emissions.

WHP was first established in 2008 and immediately set about developing a new flywheel energy-recovery system for the Williams F1 Team after the introduction of Kinetic Energy Recovery Systems (KERS) into Formula One for the 2009 season. While other teams were pouring their efforts into electric battery systems, Williams F1 opted to go down the flywheel route because of a strong belief in the technology's wider applications. While it was never raced in Formula One due to technical changes, WHP has since seen its technology adapted for a range of applications. For example, the Audi R18 hybrid car that won the 2012 Le Mans 24 Hours used a WHP flywheel. WHP has also seen its flywheel technology introduced into a series of buses as part of a deal with the Go-Ahead Group, one of the UK's biggest transport operators. In April 2014, Williams Hybrid Power was sold to GKN.

== Race cars ==
While the team has entered customer cars into Formula One races since 1974 (running as the predecessor Frank Williams Racing Cars before 1978), the first being the Williams FW (the FW standing for team founder Frank Williams), Williams has built and entered their own cars since their first season as a constructor in 1978. All of their cars are named after founder Frank Williams.

Overview of Williams race cars
Year	Car	Image	Category
1978	Williams FW06		Formula One
1979	Williams FW07		Formula One
1980	Williams FW07B		Formula One
1981	Williams FW07C		Formula One
1981	Williams FW07D		Formula One
1982	Williams FW08		Formula One
1982	Williams FW08B		Formula One
1983	Williams FW08C		Formula One
1983	Williams FW09		Formula One
1984	Williams FW09B		Formula One
1985	Williams FW10		Formula One
1986	Williams FW11		Formula One
1987	Williams FW11B		Formula One
1988	Williams FW12		Formula One
1989	Williams FW12C		Formula One
1989	Williams FW13		Formula One
1990	Williams FW13B		Formula One
1991	Williams FW14		Formula One
1992	Williams FW14B		Formula One
1993	Williams FW15C		Formula One
1993	Williams FW15D		Formula One
1994	Williams FW16		Formula One
1994	Williams FW16B		Formula One
1994	Williams FW16C		Formula One
1995	Williams FW17		Formula One
1995	Williams FW17B		Formula One
1996	Williams FW18		Formula One
1997	Williams FW19		Formula One
1998	Williams FW20		Formula One
1999	Williams FW21		Formula One
2000	Williams FW22		Formula One
2001	Williams FW23		Formula One
2002	Williams FW24		Formula One
2003	Williams FW25		Formula One
2004	Williams FW26		Formula One
2005	Williams FW27		Formula One
2006	Williams FW28		Formula One
2007	Williams FW29		Formula One
2008	Williams FW30		Formula One
2009	Williams FW31		Formula One
2009	Williams JPH1		Formula Two
2010	Williams FW32		Formula One
2010	Williams JPH1B		Formula Two
2011	Williams FW33		Formula One
2012	Williams FW34		Formula One
2013	Williams FW35		Formula One
2014	Williams FW36		Formula One
2015	Williams FW37		Formula One
2016	Williams FW38		Formula One
2017	Williams FW40		Formula One
2018	Williams FW41		Formula One
2019	Williams FW42		Formula One
2020	Williams FW43		Formula One
2021	Williams FW43B		Formula One
2022	Williams FW44		Formula One
2023	Williams FW45		Formula One
2024	Williams FW46		Formula One
2025	Williams FW47		Formula One
2026	Williams FW48		Formula One

== Formula One results ==
- Constructors' Championships winning percentage: 18.4%
- Drivers' Championships winning percentage: 14.3%
- Winning percentage: 13.1%

Formula One results
(italics indicates non-works entries; **bold** indicates championships won)
Year	Name	Car	Engine	Tyres	No.	Drivers	Points	WCC
1977	(United Kingdom) Williams Grand Prix Engineering	March 761	Ford-Cosworth DFV 3.0 V8	**G**	27.	(Belgium) Patrick Nève	—N/a	
1978	(United Kingdom) Williams Grand Prix Engineering	FW06	Ford-Cosworth DFV 3.0 V8	**G**	27.	(Australia) Alan Jones	11	9th
1979	(United Kingdom) Albilad-Saudia Racing Team	FW06; FW07	Ford-Cosworth DFV 3.0 V8	**G**	27. 28.	(Australia) Alan Jones (Switzerland) Clay Regazzoni	75	2nd
1980	(United Kingdom) Albilad Williams Racing Team	FW07; FW07B	Ford-Cosworth DFV 3.0 V8	**G**	27. 28.	(Australia) **Alan Jones** (Argentina) Carlos Reutemann	**120**	**1st**
1980	(United Kingdom) Brands Hatch Racing	FW07; FW07B	Ford-Cosworth DFV 3.0 V8	**G**	43.	(South Africa) Desiré Wilson	**120**	**1st**
1980	(United Kingdom) RAM – Penthouse Rizla Racing (United Kingdom) RAM – Rainbow Jeans Racing (United Kingdom) RAM Theodore – Rainbow Jeans Racing	FW07; FW07B	Ford-Cosworth DFV 3.0 V8	**G**	50. 51. 51.	(United Kingdom) Rupert Keegan (United States) Kevin Cogan (United Kingdom) Geoff Lees	**120**	**1st**
1981	(United Kingdom) Albilad Williams Racing Team	FW07C	Ford-Cosworth DFV 3.0 V8	**M** **G**	1. 2.	(Australia) Alan Jones (Argentina) Carlos Reutemann	**95**	**1st**
1981	(United Kingdom) TAG Williams Racing Team	FW07C	Ford-Cosworth DFV 3.0 V8	**M** **G**	1. 2.	(Australia) Alan Jones (Argentina) Carlos Reutemann	**95**	**1st**
1982	(United Kingdom) TAG Williams Racing Team	FW07C; FW08	Ford-Cosworth DFV 3.0 V8	**G**	5. 5. 5. 6.	(Argentina) Carlos Reutemann (United States) Mario Andretti (Republic of Ireland) Derek Daly (Finland) **Keke Rosberg**	58	4th
1983	(United Kingdom) TAG Williams Racing Team	FW08C	Ford-Cosworth DFV 3.0 V8	**G**	1. 2. 42.	(Finland) Keke Rosberg (France) Jacques Laffite (United Kingdom) Jonathan Palmer	36	4th
1983	(United Kingdom) TAG Williams Racing Team	FW09	Honda RA163E 1.5 V6 t	**G**	1. 2. 42.	(Finland) Keke Rosberg (France) Jacques Laffite (United Kingdom) Jonathan Palmer	2	11th
1984	(United Kingdom) Williams Grand Prix Engineering	FW09; FW09B	Honda RA163E 1.5 V6 t Honda RA164E 1.5 V6 t	**G**	5. 6.	(France) Jacques Laffite (Finland) Keke Rosberg	25.5	6th
1985	(United Kingdom) Canon Williams Honda Team	FW10; FW10B	Honda RA164E 1.5 V6 t	**G**	5. 6.	(United Kingdom) Nigel Mansell (Finland) Keke Rosberg	71	3rd
1986	(United Kingdom) Canon Williams Honda Team	FW11	Honda RA166E 1.5 V6 t	**G**	5. 6.	(United Kingdom) Nigel Mansell (Brazil) Nelson Piquet	**141**	**1st**
1987	(United Kingdom) Canon Williams Honda Team	FW11B	Honda RA167E 1.5 V6 t	**G**	5. 5. 6.	(United Kingdom) Nigel Mansell (Italy) Riccardo Patrese (Brazil) **Nelson Piquet**	**137**	**1st**
1988	(United Kingdom) Canon Williams Team	FW12	Judd CV 3.5 V8	**G**	5. 5. 5. 6.	(United Kingdom) Nigel Mansell (United Kingdom) Martin Brundle (France) Jean-Louis Schlesser (Italy) Riccardo Patrese	20	7th
1989	(United Kingdom) Canon Williams Team	FW12C; FW13	Renault RS1 3.5 V10	**G**	5. 6.	(Belgium) Thierry Boutsen (Italy) Riccardo Patrese	77	2nd
1990	(United Kingdom) Canon Williams Team	FW13B	Renault RS2 3.5 V10	**G**	5. 6.	(Belgium) Thierry Boutsen (Italy) Riccardo Patrese	57	4th
1991	(United Kingdom) Canon Williams Team	FW14	Renault RS3 3.5 V10	**G**	5. 6.	(United Kingdom) Nigel Mansell (Italy) Riccardo Patrese	125	2nd
1992	(United Kingdom) Canon Williams Team	FW14B	Renault RS3C 3.5 V10; Renault RS4 3.5 V10	**G**	5. 6.	(United Kingdom) **Nigel Mansell** (Italy) Riccardo Patrese	**164**	**1st**
1993	(United Kingdom) Canon Williams Team	FW15C	Renault RS5 3.5 V10	**G**	0. 2.	(United Kingdom) Damon Hill (France) **Alain Prost**	**168**	**1st**
1994	(United Kingdom) Rothmans Williams Renault	FW16; FW16B	Renault RS6 3.5 V10	**G**	0. 2. 2. 2.	(United Kingdom) Damon Hill (Brazil) Ayrton Senna (United Kingdom) David Coulthard (United Kingdom) Nigel Mansell	**118**	**1st**
1995	(United Kingdom) Rothmans Williams Renault	FW17; FW17B	Renault RS7 3.0 V10	**G**	5. 6.	(United Kingdom) Damon Hill (United Kingdom) David Coulthard	112	2nd
1996	(United Kingdom) Rothmans Williams Renault	FW18	Renault RS8 3.0 V10	**G**	5. 6.	(United Kingdom) **Damon Hill** (Canada) Jacques Villeneuve	**175**	**1st**
1997	(United Kingdom) Rothmans Williams Renault	FW19	Renault RS9 3.0 V10	**G**	3. 4.	(Canada) **Jacques Villeneuve** (Germany) Heinz-Harald Frentzen	**123**	**1st**
1998	(United Kingdom) Winfield Williams	FW20	Mecachrome GC37-01 3.0 V10	**G**	1. 2.	(Canada) Jacques Villeneuve (Germany) Heinz-Harald Frentzen	38	3rd
1999	(United Kingdom) Winfield Williams	FW21	Supertec FB01 3.0 V10	**B**	5. 6.	(Italy) Alessandro Zanardi (Germany) Ralf Schumacher	35	5th
2000	(United Kingdom) BMW WilliamsF1 Team	FW22	BMW E41 3.0 V10	**B**	9. 10.	(Germany) Ralf Schumacher (United Kingdom) Jenson Button	36	3rd
2001	(United Kingdom) BMW WilliamsF1 Team	FW23	BMW P80 3.0 V10	**M**	5. 6.	(Germany) Ralf Schumacher (Colombia) Juan Pablo Montoya	80	3rd
2002	(United Kingdom) BMW WilliamsF1 Team	FW24	BMW P82 3.0 V10	**M**	5. 6.	(Germany) Ralf Schumacher (Colombia) Juan Pablo Montoya	92	2nd
2003	(United Kingdom) BMW WilliamsF1 Team	FW25	BMW P83 3.0 V10	**M**	3. 4. 4.	(Colombia) Juan Pablo Montoya (Germany) Ralf Schumacher (Spain) Marc Gené	144	2nd
2004	(United Kingdom) BMW WilliamsF1 Team	FW26	BMW P84 3.0 V10	**M**	3. 4. 4. 4.	(Colombia) Juan Pablo Montoya (Germany) Ralf Schumacher (Spain) Marc Gené (Brazil) Antônio Pizzonia	88	4th
2005	(United Kingdom) BMW WilliamsF1 Team	FW27	BMW P84/5 3.0 V10	**M**	7. 8. 8.	(Australia) Mark Webber (Germany) Nick Heidfeld (Brazil) Antônio Pizzonia	66	5th
2006	(United Kingdom) WilliamsF1 Team	FW28	Cosworth CA2006 2.4 V8	**B**	9. 10.	(Australia) Mark Webber (Germany) Nico Rosberg	11	8th
2007	(United Kingdom) AT&T Williams	FW29	Toyota RVX-07 2.4 V8	**B**	16. 17. 17.	(Germany) Nico Rosberg (Austria) Alexander Wurz (Japan) Kazuki Nakajima	33	4th
2008	(United Kingdom) AT&T Williams	FW30	Toyota RVX-08 2.4 V8	**B**	7. 8.	(Germany) Nico Rosberg (Japan) Kazuki Nakajima	26	8th
2009	(United Kingdom) AT&T Williams	FW31	Toyota RVX-09 2.4 V8	**B**	16. 17.	(Germany) Nico Rosberg (Japan) Kazuki Nakajima	34.5	7th
2010	(United Kingdom) AT&T Williams	FW32	Cosworth CA2010 2.4 V8	**B**	9. 10.	(Brazil) Rubens Barrichello (Germany) Nico Hülkenberg	69	6th
2011	(United Kingdom) AT&T Williams	FW33	Cosworth CA2011K 2.4 V8	**P**	11. 12.	(Brazil) Rubens Barrichello (Venezuela) Pastor Maldonado	5	9th
2012	(United Kingdom) Williams F1 Team	FW34	Renault RS27-2012 2.4 V8	**P**	18. 19.	(Venezuela) Pastor Maldonado (Brazil) Bruno Senna	76	8th
2013	(United Kingdom) Williams F1 Team	FW35	Renault RS27-2013 2.4 V8	**P**	16. 17.	(Venezuela) Pastor Maldonado (Finland) Valtteri Bottas	5	9th
2014	(United Kingdom) Williams Martini Racing	FW36	Mercedes PU106A Hybrid 1.6 V6 t	**P**	19. 77.	(Brazil) Felipe Massa (Finland) Valtteri Bottas	320	3rd
2015	(United Kingdom) Williams Martini Racing	FW37	Mercedes PU106B Hybrid 1.6 V6 t	**P**	19. 77.	(Brazil) Felipe Massa (Finland) Valtteri Bottas	257	3rd
2016	(United Kingdom) Williams Martini Racing	FW38	Mercedes PU106C Hybrid 1.6 V6 t	**P**	19. 77.	(Brazil) Felipe Massa (Finland) Valtteri Bottas	138	5th
2017	(United Kingdom) Williams Martini Racing	FW40	Mercedes M08 EQ Power+ 1.6 V6 t	**P**	18. 19. 40.	(Canada) Lance Stroll (Brazil) Felipe Massa (United Kingdom) Paul di Resta	83	5th
2018	(United Kingdom) Williams Martini Racing	FW41	Mercedes M09 EQ Power+ 1.6 V6 t	**P**	18. 35.	(Canada) Lance Stroll (Russia) Sergey Sirotkin	7	10th
2019	(United Kingdom) ROKiT Williams Racing	FW42	Mercedes M10 EQ Power+ 1.6 V6 t	**P**	63. 88.	(United Kingdom) George Russell (Poland) Robert Kubica	1	10th
2020	(United Kingdom) Williams Racing	FW43	Mercedes M11 EQ Performance 1.6 V6 t	**P**	6. 63. 89.	(Canada) Nicholas Latifi (United Kingdom) George Russell (United Kingdom) Jack Aitken	0	10th
2021	(United Kingdom) Williams Racing	FW43B	Mercedes M12 E Performance 1.6 V6 t	**P**	6. 63.	(Canada) Nicholas Latifi (United Kingdom) George Russell	23	8th
2022	(United Kingdom) Williams Racing	FW44	Mercedes M13 E Performance 1.6 V6 t	**P**	6. 23. 45.	(Canada) Nicholas Latifi (Thailand) Alexander Albon (Netherlands) Nyck de Vries	8	10th
2023	(United Kingdom) Williams Racing	FW45	Mercedes M14 E Performance 1.6 V6 t	**P**	2. 23.	(United States) Logan Sargeant (Thailand) Alexander Albon	28	7th
2024	(United Kingdom) Williams Racing	FW46	Mercedes M15 E Performance 1.6 V6 t	**P**	2. 23. 43.	(United States) Logan Sargeant (Thailand) Alexander Albon (Argentina) Franco Colapinto	17	9th
2025	(United Kingdom) Atlassian Williams Racing	FW47	Mercedes M16 E Performance 1.6 V6 t	**P**	23. 55.	(Thailand) Alexander Albon (Spain) Carlos Sainz Jr.	137	5th
2026	(United Kingdom) Atlassian Williams F1 Team	FW48	Mercedes 1.6 V6 t	**P**	23. 55.	(Thailand) Alexander Albon (Spain) Carlos Sainz Jr.	12*	9th*
* Season still in progress.

=== Drivers' Champions ===
The following drivers won the Formula One Drivers' Championship for Williams:

- (Australia) Alan Jones (1980)
- (Finland) Keke Rosberg (1982)
- (Brazil) Nelson Piquet (1987)
- (United Kingdom) Nigel Mansell (1992)
- (France) Alain Prost (1993)
- (United Kingdom) Damon Hill (1996)
- (Canada) Jacques Villeneuve (1997)

=== Esports ===
Year	Name	Car	Engine	Tyres	No.	Drivers	Points	WCC
2018	(United Kingdom) Williams Esports	FW41	Mercedes M09 EQ Power+ 1.6 V6 t	P	93. 42. 96.	(Spain) Álvaro Carretón (Finland) Tino Naukkarinen (Germany) Alex Hanses	69	7th
2019	(United Kingdom) Williams Esports	FW42	Mercedes M10 EQ Power+ 1.6 V6 t	P	93. 42. N.A.	(Spain) Álvaro Carretón (Finland) Tino Naukkarinen (United Kingdom) Issac Price	105	5th
2020	(United Kingdom) Williams Esports	FW43	Mercedes M11 EQ Performance 1.6 V6 t	P	21. 88. 53.	(Spain) Álvaro Carretón (Turkey) Salih Saltunç (Greece) Michael Romanidis	45	8th
2021	(United Kingdom) Williams Esports	FW43B	Mercedes M12 E Performance 1.6 V6 t	P	21. 53. 23.	(Spain) Álvaro Carretón (Greece) Michael Romanidis (Italy) Alessio di Capua	46	8th
2022	(United Kingdom) Williams Esports	FW44	Mercedes M13 E Performance 1.6 V6 t	P	21. 92. 79.	(Spain) Álvaro Carretón (Italy) Daniele Haddad (United Kingdom) Shanaka Clay	8	10th
2023-24	(United Kingdom) Williams Esports	FW45	Mercedes M14 E Performance 1.6 V6 t	P	9. 73. 54.	(Spain) Álvaro Carretón (United Kingdom) Will Lewis (Spain) Ismael Fahssi	81	7th
2025	(United Kingdom) Atlassian Williams Sim Racing	FW46	Mercedes M16 E Performance 1.6 V6 t	P	9. 93. 54.	(Spain) Álvaro Carretón (Spain) Rubén Pedreño (Spain) Ismael Fahssi	153	4th
2026	(United Kingdom) Atlassian Williams F1 Team Gaming	FW48	Mercedes M17 E Performance 1.6 V6 t	P	21. 40. 62.	(Spain) Álvaro Carretón (France) Nicolas Longuet (Hungary) Itsván Puki	144	4th

=== Complete F1 Esports Series results ===
(key (results in bold indicate pole position; results in italics indicate fastest lap)

Year	Chassis	Drivers	1	2	3	4	5	6	7	8	9	10	11	12	Points	WCC
2018	Williams FW41		AUS	CHN	AZE	FRA	GBR	BEL	GER	SIN	USA	ABU			69	7th
2018	Williams FW41	(Spain) Álvaro Carretón	7	13	16	7	13	12	5	2	18	17			69	7th
2018	Williams FW41	(Finland) Tino Naukkarinen	2	15	11	13	6	9	10	15	11	16			69	7th
2018	Williams FW41	(Germany) Alex Hanses													69	7th
2019	Williams FW42		BHR	CHN	AZE	CAN	RBR	GBR	GER	BEL	ITA	JPN	USA	BRA	105	5th
2019	Williams FW42	(Spain) Álvaro Carretón	18	15	6	10	17	4	12	7		**5**	7	3	105	5th
2019	Williams FW42	(Finland) Tino Naukkarinen			2	**6**	8	20	20	8	4	16	10		105	5th
2019	Williams FW42	(United Kingdom) Isaac Price	17	14							15			20	105	5th
2020	Williams FW43		BHR	VIE	CHN	NED	CAN	RBR	GBR	BEL	ITA	JPN	MEX	BRA	45	8th
2020	Williams FW43	(Spain) Álvaro Carretón	9	12	4	9		**4**	17	18	6	20	9	13	45	8th
2020	Williams FW43	(Turkey) Salih Saltunç	15		12		14	16	15					14	45	8th
2020	Williams FW43	(Greece) Michael Romanidis		11		15	7			10	12	12	16		45	8th
2021	Williams FW43B		BHR	CHN	RBR	GBR	ITA	BEL	POR	NED	USA	EMI	MEX	BRA	46	8th
2021	Williams FW43B	(Spain) Álvaro Carretón	3	Ret	6	20	10	12	19	19	8	19	16	8	46	8th
2021	Williams FW43B	(Greece) Michael Romanidis	20	9			16	14	8		18	6	12		46	8th
2021	Williams FW43B	(Italy) Alessio di Capua			13	15				13				16	46	8th
2022	Williams FW44		BHR	EMI	GBR	RBR	BEL	NED	ITA	MEX	USA	JPN	BRA	UAE	8	10th
2022	Williams FW44	(Spain) Álvaro Carretón	12	10	15	12		12			8	18	13	13	8	10th
2022	Williams FW44	(Italy) Daniele Haddad		13			18	15	10	16	20	Ret		11	8	10th
2022	Williams FW44	(United Kingdom) Shanaka Clay													8	10th
2023–24	Williams FW45		BHR	JED	RBR	GBR	BEL	NED	USA	MEX	BRA	LVG	QAT	UAE	81	7th
2023–24	Williams FW45	(Spain) Álvaro Carretón	18	18	11			12	6	6	15	8	8	8	81	7th
2023–24	Williams FW45	(United Kingdom) Will Lewis				16	Ret								81	7th
2023–24	Williams FW45	(Spain) Ismael Fahssi	8	3	3	4	8	9	20	Ret	11	12	14	Ret	81	7th
2025	Williams FW46		AUS	CHN	BHR	SAU	GBR	BEL	NED	USA	MXC	SAP	QAT	ABU	153	4th
2025	Williams FW46	(Spain) Álvaro Carretón	18	12		8	14	Ret		7	12	7		Ret	153	4th
2025	Williams FW46	(Spain) Rubén Pedreño			14				12				11		153	4th
2025	Williams FW46	(Spain) Ismael Fahssi	**1**	4	**2**	**6**	11	17	2	6	7	4	3	5	153	4th
2026	Williams FW48		CHN	JPN	BHR	SAU	CAT	GBR	BEL	NED	USA	MXC	SAP	ABU	144	4th
2026	Williams FW48	(Spain) Álvaro Carretón		Ret				5		11	14		4		144	4th
2026	Williams FW48	(France) Nicolas Longuet	8	4	2	4	4	18	16	4	**3**	15	10	4	144	4th
2026	Williams FW48	(Hungary) Itsván Puki	Ret		6	15	17		6			7		16	144	4th

* Season still in progress

Achievements
Preceded by Ferrari	Formula One Constructors' Champion; 1980–1981	Succeeded by Ferrari
Preceded by McLaren	Formula One Constructors' Champion; 1986–1987	Succeeded by McLaren
Preceded by McLaren	Formula One Constructors' Champion; 1992–1993–1994	Succeeded by Benetton
Preceded by Benetton	Formula One Constructors' Champion; 1996–1997	Succeeded by McLaren
