= Williams FW44 =

2022 Formula One racing car

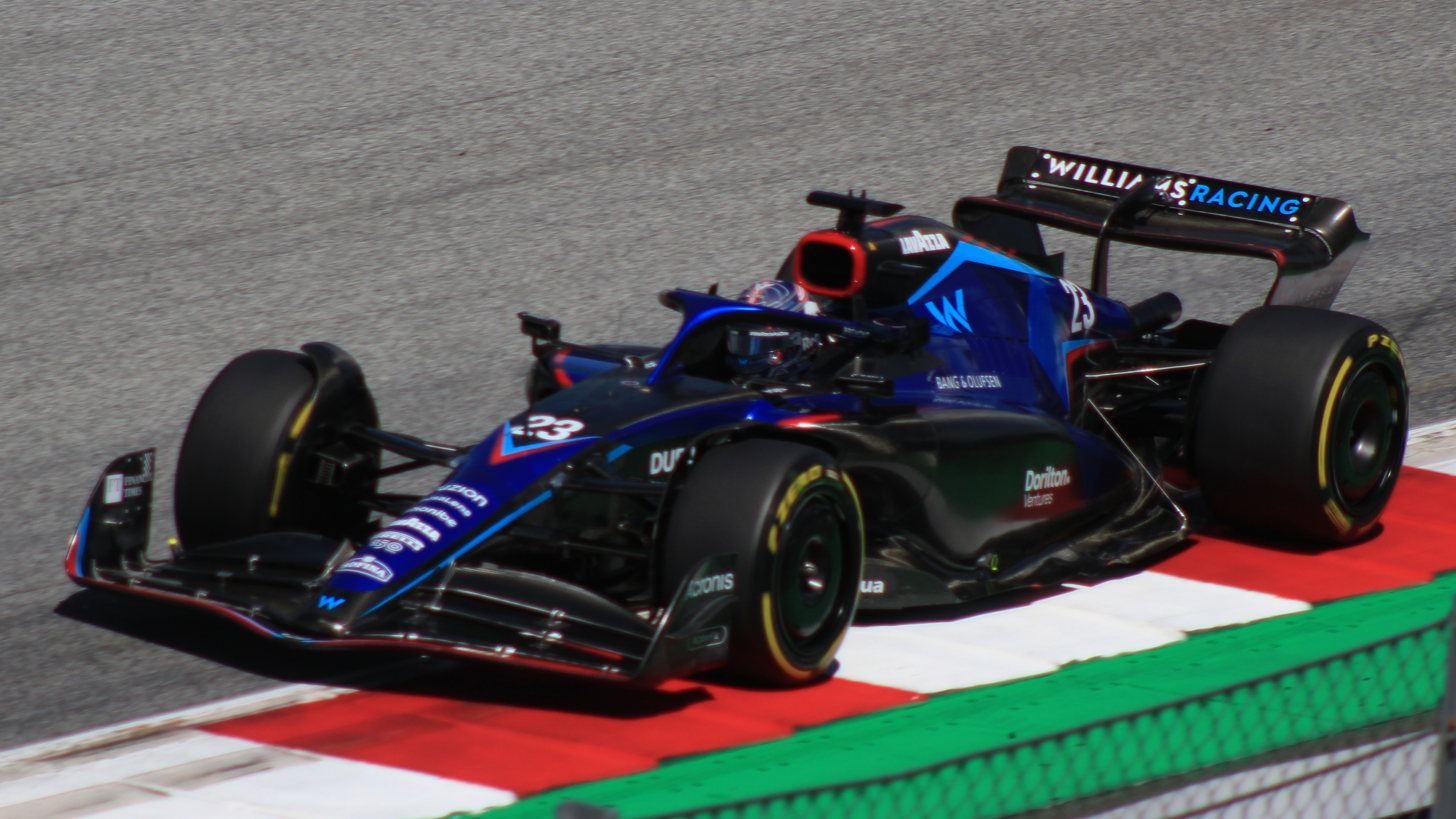
- Alexander Albon in the Williams FW44 during free practice at the Austrian Grand Prix
- Category: Formula One
- Constructor: Williams
- Designers: François-Xavier Demaison (Technical Director); Adam Carter (Engineering Director); David Wheater (Aerodynamics Director); David Worner (Design Director); Jonathan Carter (Head of Design); Dave Robson (Head of Vehicle Performance); Adam Kenyon (Head of Aerodynamic Science)
- Predecessor: Williams FW43B
- Successor: Williams FW45

Technical specifications
- Chassis: Carbon-fibre monocoque, laminated from carbon epoxy and honeycomb
- Suspension (front): Double wishbone, push-rod activated springs and anti-roll bar
- Suspension (rear): Double wishbone, pull-rod activated springs and anti-roll bar
- Width: 2000mm
- Height: 970 mm
- Engine: Mercedes-AMG M13 E Performance 1.6 L (98 cu in) direct injection V6 turbocharged engine limited to 15,000 RPM in a mid-mounted, rear-wheel drive layout
- Electric motor: Kinetic and Thermal energy recovery systems
- Transmission: Mercedes-AMG 8 forward + 1 reverse gear seamless sequential semi-automatic shift plus reverse gear, gear selection electro-hydraulically actuated
- Battery: Lithium-ion battery
- Weight: 798 kg (1759 lbs)
- Fuel: Petronas Primax
- Tyres: Pirelli P Zero (dry); Pirelli Cinturato (wet)

Competition history
- Notable entrants: Williams Racing
- Notable drivers: 6. (Canada) Nicholas Latifi; 23. (Thailand) Alexander Albon; 45. (Netherlands) Nyck de Vries
- Debut: 2022 Bahrain Grand Prix
- Last event: 2022 Abu Dhabi Grand Prix
Races	Wins	Podiums	Poles	F/Laps
22	0	0	0	0

The Williams FW44 is a Formula One racing car designed and constructed by Williams that competed in the 2022 Formula One World Championship. The car was driven by Nicholas Latifi and Alexander Albon, who were in their third and first years with the team respectively. Nyck de Vries participated in the Italian Grand Prix in the FW44, replacing Albon due to the Thai driver suffering appendicitis. The chassis is Williams' first car under the 2022 technical regulations, and their first to be developed wholly under new owners, Dorilton Capital, with Jost Capito at the helm.

== Design and development ==
The FW44 was first revealed on 15 February 2022 with a shakedown at Silverstone Circuit. Both Albon and Latifi drove the car. On the same day, Williams launched their new livery for 2022 which was a darker blue design compared to the previous predominantly white cars.

With 2022 featuring new technical regulations, the FW44 is a significantly different design to the FW43. With a notably tight design around the sidepod radiators, aerodynamics from the front pushing air to the floor which will be generating ground effect. The FW44 once again utilised Mercedes AMG engines, however it is the first Williams to also utilise their gearbox.

During the first rounds of the season, paint was gradually removed from the FW44 to save weight. Discussions about removing the paint happened, however it did not materialise due to the marketing and sponsorship requirements of the team.

At the British Grand Prix, a major update for the FW44 was revealed with a new floor, sidepod design and rear wing. The design was similar to that of the Red Bull. At the following Grand Prix in Austria, Williams added further revisions to the front suspension of the FW44.

== Racing performance ==
At the first round of the season in Bahrain, both Latifi and Albon were able to complete the race. In Saudi Arabia, both cars were involved in collisions but Albon was classified 14th due to the amount of race distance completed. At the third round of the season in Australia, the FW44 picked up its first point with Albon finishing in 10th. In Miami, Albon would finish in 9th place adding two more points to the team total.

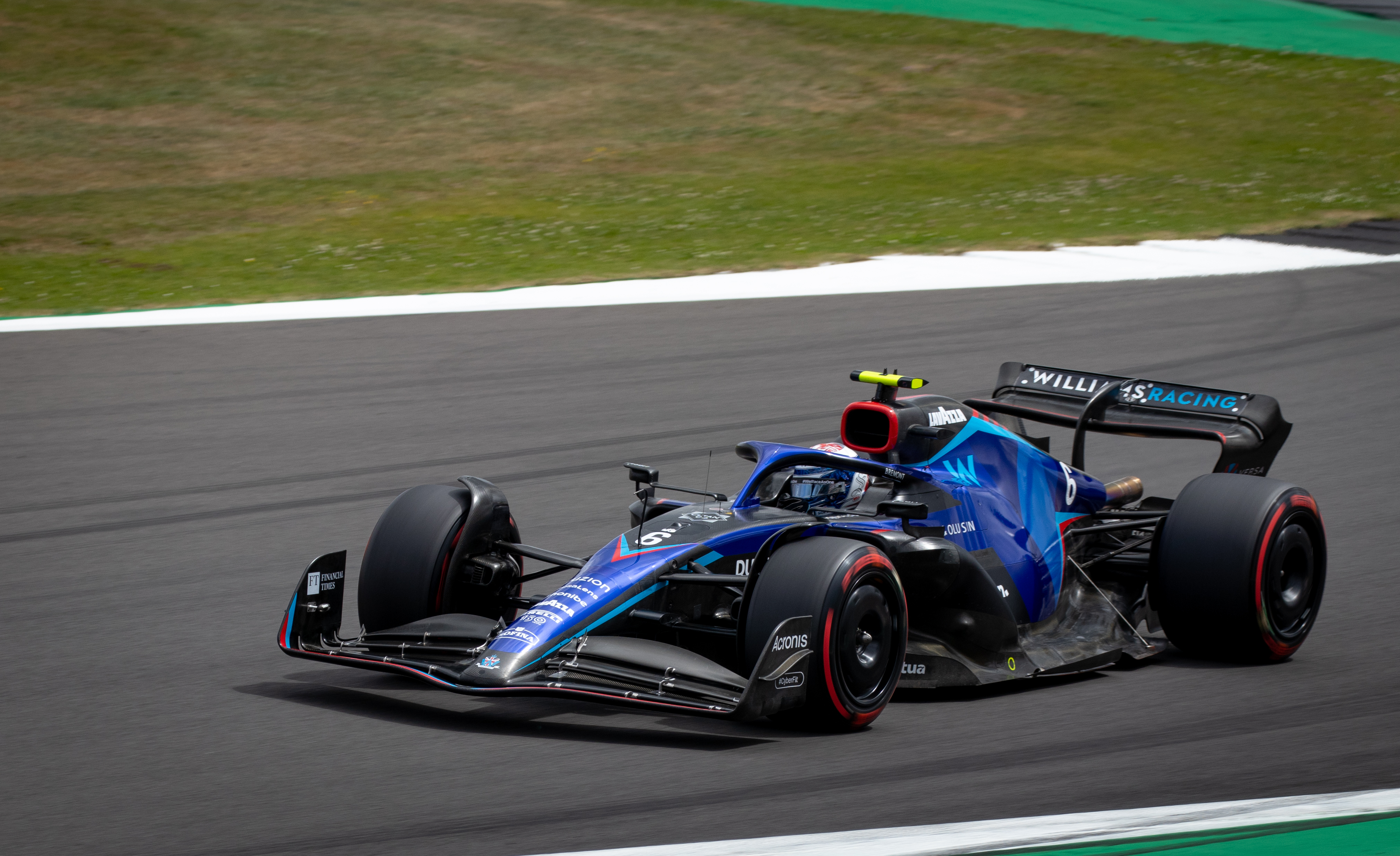
Latifi during the British Grand Prix

Ahead of the Spanish Grand Prix, Nyck De Vries took the wheel of the FW44 in FP1. He completed 28 laps, and was classified in 18th position ahead of regular driver Nicholas Latifi.

At Silverstone, Albon was involved in a major incident at the first corner involving Zhou Guanyu, George Russell and Pierre Gasly. Zhou's Alfa Romeo flipped over the top of Albon's Williams before launching over the tyre wall into the catch fencing. Albon was sent to University Hospital Coventry for checks after the crash, however was released on the same day.

== Livery ==
This was the first Williams car to not feature the Ayrton Senna tribute logo. Capito said that "the decision was that we want to move on in the future".

== Complete Formula One results ==
Key

Key
Colour	Result
Gold	Winner
Silver	Second place
Bronze	Third place
Green	Other points position
Blue	Other classified position
Blue	Not classified, finished (NC)
Purple	Not classified, retired (Ret)
Red	Did not qualify (DNQ)
Black	Disqualified (DSQ)
White	Did not start (DNS)
White	Race cancelled (C)
Blank	Did not practice (DNP)
Blank	Excluded (EX)
Blank	Did not arrive (DNA)
Blank	Withdrawn (WD)
Blank	Did not enter (empty cell)
Annotation	Meaning
P	Pole position
F	Fastest lap
Superscript number	Points-scoring position in sprint

Year	Entrant	Power unit	Tyres	Driver name	Grands Prix																						Points	WCC pos.
Year	Entrant	Power unit	Tyres	Driver name	BHR	SAU	AUS	EMI	MIA	ESP	MON	AZE	CAN	GBR	AUT	FRA	HUN	BEL	NED	ITA	SIN	JPN	USA	MXC	SAP	ABU	Points	WCC pos.
2022	Williams Racing	Mercedes-AMG F1 M13	P	(Thailand) Alexander Albon	13	14†	10	11	9	18	Ret	12	13	Ret	12	13	17	10	12	WD	Ret	Ret	13	12	15	13	8	10th
2022	Williams Racing	Mercedes-AMG F1 M13	P	(Canada) Nicholas Latifi	16	Ret	16	16	14	16	15	15	16	12	Ret	Ret	18	18	18	15	Ret	9	17	18	16	19†	8	10th
2022	Williams Racing	Mercedes-AMG F1 M13	P	(Netherlands) Nyck de Vries																9							8	10th
