= Williams FW45 =

2023 Formula One car

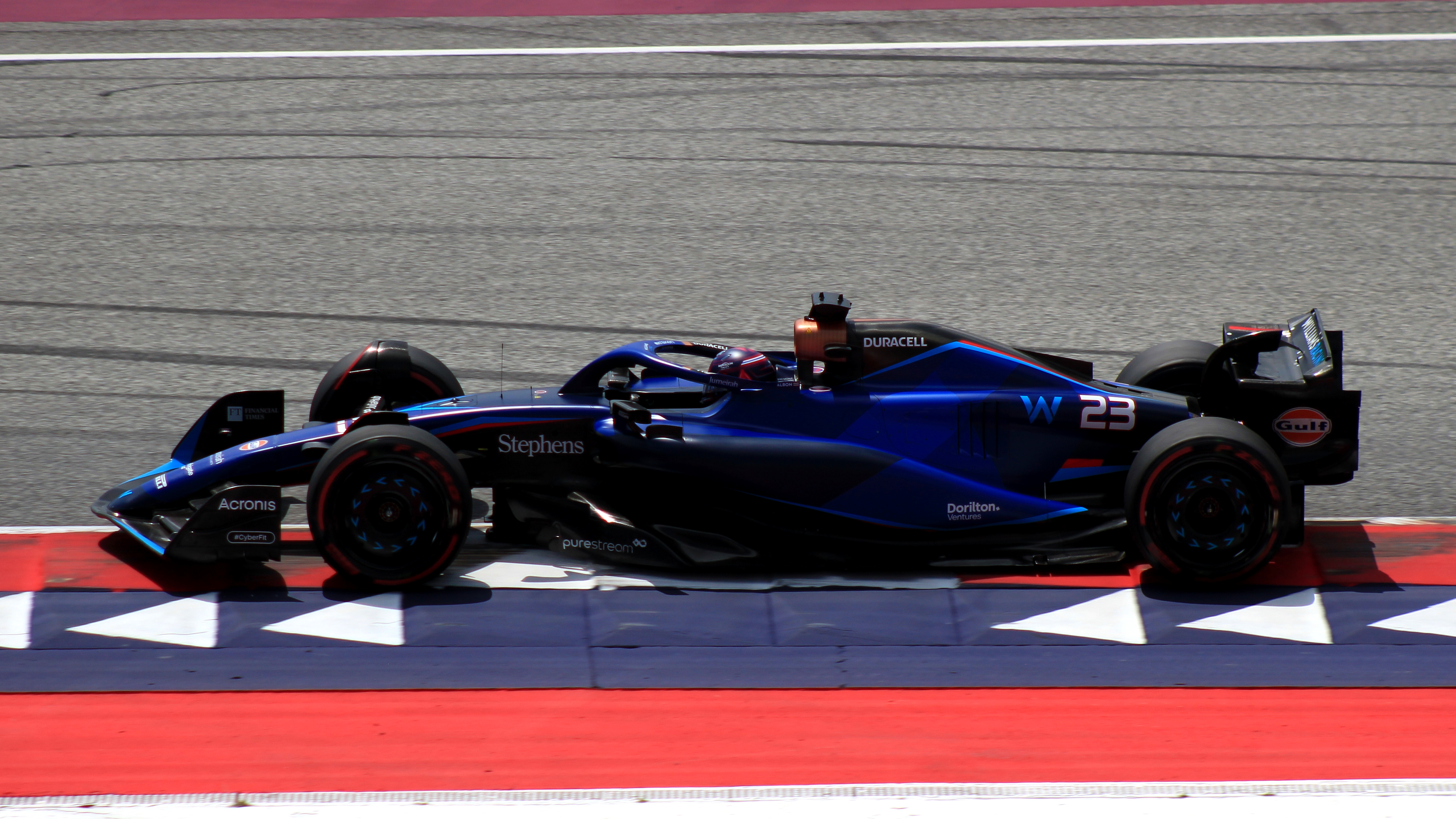
- Alex Albon driving an FW45 during the Austrian Grand Prix.
- Category: Formula One
- Constructor: Williams
- Designers: François-Xavier Demaison (Technical Director); David Worner (Design Director); Jonathan Carter (Deputy Chief Designer); David Wheater (Aerodynamics Director); Dave Robson (Head of Vehicle Performance); Adam Kenyon (Chief Aerodynamicist)
- Predecessor: Williams FW44
- Successor: Williams FW46

Technical specifications
- Chassis: Carbon-fibre monocoque, laminated from carbon epoxy and honeycomb
- Suspension (front): Double wishbone, push-rod activated springs and anti-roll bar
- Suspension (rear): Double wishbone, pull-rod activated springs and anti-roll bar
- Engine: Mercedes-AMG M14 E Performance 1.6 L (98 cu in) direct injection V6 turbocharged engine limited to 15,000 RPM in a mid-mounted, rear-wheel drive layout
- Electric motor: Kinetic and thermal energy recovery systems
- Transmission: Mercedes-AMG 8 forward + 1 reverse gear seamless sequential semi-automatic shift plus reverse gear, gear selection electro-hydraulically actuated
- Battery: Lithium-ion battery
- Fuel: Gulf
- Lubricants: Gulf
- Tyres: Pirelli P Zero (dry); Pirelli Cinturato (wet)

Competition history
- Notable entrants: Williams Racing
- Notable drivers: 2. (United States) Logan Sargeant; 23. (Thailand) Alexander Albon
- Debut: 2023 Bahrain Grand Prix
- Last event: 2023 Abu Dhabi Grand Prix
Races	Wins	Podiums	Poles	F/Laps
22	0	0	0	0

The Williams FW45 is a Formula One racing car designed and constructed by Williams to compete in the 2023 Formula One World Championship. The car was driven by Logan Sargeant and Alexander Albon in their first and second years with the team respectively.

The FW45 is among the first Mercedes-AMG powered F1 car to utilize non Petronas-branded fuel and lubricants since 2016 along with the Aston Martin AMR23.

== Design and development ==
The FW45 was first revealed on 6 February 2023.

== Season summary ==
=== First 10 races ===
Albon qualified 15th for the season opener at Bahrain with Sargeant qualifying 16th. Sargeant was knocked out in Q1 due to setting his lap time later than Lando Norris despite both drivers setting the same time. Sargeant moved up 4 places at the start into 12th place where he would finish the race whilst Albon went on a brilliant strategy to finish 10th, holding off AlphaTauri's Yuki Tsunoda to score the team's first point of the season meaning the team left Bahrain 6th in the constructors' championship with 1 point.

Sargeant failed to set a time in qualifying in Jeddah due to having his first lap deleted, spinning on his second and being forced to stop with mechanical problems on his third but he was given permission to race by the stewards. Albon qualified 17th for the race. Albon was forced to retire on lap 28 due to brake failure whilst Sargeant tried to fight for points but his tyres went off and he slipped back to 16th at the flag. Williams left Jeddah 9th in the championship level with Haas but behind on countback.

Albon qualified an impressive 8th for the Australian Grand Prix with Sargeant qualifying 18th. Albon was running in 6th place early on in the race but had a heavy crash on lap 7 which bought out the red flag. Sargeant ran out of the points for most of the race but another late red flag gave him a chance for points, however at the restart Sargeant crashed into the back of Nyck de Vries at turn 1 taking both himself and the AlphaTauri driver out of the race with Sargeant lucky not to receive a penalty for the collision. Due to Nico Hülkenberg finishing 7th and Yuki Tsunoda finishing 10th, Williams slipped to 10th and last in the constructors' championship, level with AlphaTauri but behind on countback and 6 points behind Haas.

Albon qualified 13th for the first sprint race of the season in Baku with Sargeant qualifying 15th. For the first ever sprint qualifying session Sargeant made it into SQ2 but crashed heavily in SQ1 meaning he could only start a minimum of 15th on the grid whilst Albon qualified a brilliant 7th. The team later withdraw Sargeant from the sprint as his car was too damaged to be repaired in time for the shorter race. Albon fought for points in the sprint slipped back to 9th place at the flag. Albon finished the main race 12th with Sargeant finishing 16th. But due to Yuki Tsunoda scoring another point, Williams fell 1 point behind the Italian team meaning they were now right at the bottom of the constructors' championship in 10th.

Albon qualified 11th for the Miami Grand Prix with Sargeant qualifying 20th and last for the first of his three home Grands Prix. Albon finished the race 14th with Sargeant finishing 20th and last, one lap down. Albon qualified 13th for the Monaco Grand Prix with Sargeant qualifying 16th. Sargeant was hit by Nico Hülkenberg on lap 1 at Mirabeau which damaged his car. This ended his chance for points meaning he finished 18th and last of the runners, 2 laps down. Albon finished 14th, one lap down.

Qualifying for the Spanish Grand Prix was a disaster with Albon qualifying 18th and Sargeant 20th. Sargeant finished the race 20th, one lap down with Albon finishing 16th. Sargeant qualified 19th for the Canadian Grand Prix but Albon had a brilliant session qualifying 10th and also finishing fastest in Q2. Sargeant retired from the race due to an oil leak on lap 6. Albon had a brilliant race, pitting under the safety car caused by George Russell's crash on lap 12. Albon then took his hard tyres to the end of the race, holding off faster cars like Alpine's Esteban Ocon, Aston Martin's Lance Stroll, Alfa Romeo's Valtteri Bottas and old F2 rival Lando Norris to finish in 7th the team's first points since Bahrain. Albon's driving was so good he received the driver of the day award. The 7th place finish moved Williams from 10th to 9th in the constructors' championship with 7 points, 5 ahead of AlphaTauri, 1 behind Haas and 3 behind Alfa Romeo.

Sargeant during the Austrian Grand Prix, where he finished 13th.

Albon qualified 10th for the Austrian Grand Prix with Sargeant qualifying 18th. Albon qualified 11th for the sprint with Sargeant qualifying 20th. Albon finished the sprint 13th with Sargeant 18th. Albon finished the main race 11th with Sargeant two places behind in 13th. With Nico Hülkenberg's 6th in the sprint, the team now sat 4 points behind Haas in the fight for 7th in the constructors' championship.

Albon qualified 8th for the team's home race at Silverstone with Sargeant qualifying 14th. Albon overtook the two Ferraris late on in the race to finish 8th with Sargeant just missing out on scoring his first points by finishing 11th.

After the first ten races, Williams sat 8th in the constructors' championship with 11 points, level with Haas but behind on countback. Albon was 13th in the drivers' championship with 11 points whilst Sargeant was 19th in the drivers' championship with 0 points.

=== Hungary to Japan ===
Albon qualified 16th for the Hungarian Grand Prix with Sargeant qualifying 20th and last. Albon finished 11th, just missing out on points whilst Sargeant retired on lap 67 after a spin whilst running 17th that caused his car to start overheating. Qualifying for the Belgian Grand Prix, a track where Williams expected their car to have pace, was disappointing, with Albon qualifying 16th and Sargeant qualifying 18th. Sprint qualifying went better with Albon and Sargeant qualifying 12th and 13th respectively. Albon finished the sprint 12th with Sargeant finishing 16th. Albon finished the main race 14th with Sargeant finishing 17th.

Williams entered the summer break 8th in the constructors' championship, still level with Haas but still behind on countback with Albon remaining 13th in the drivers' championship with 11 points and Sargeant was still 19th in the drivers' championship without having scored a single point all season.

Both cars made it into Q3 at Zandvoort, the team's first double Q3 appearance in 2023, but Sargeant crashed at the start of Q3 limiting himself to 10th on the grid, but it still marked the first time Sargeant had qualified in the top 10 during his rookie season. Albon meanwhile qualified in an impressive 4th place, earning a second row start for the Thai driver. Sargeant crashed out of the race on lap 16 due to a hydraulic failure spinning him into the barriers. Albon ran in the points the whole race, finishing 8th and scoring more points for the team. This moved Williams up to 7th in the constructors' championship, 4 points ahead of Haas.

Sargeant qualified 15th for the Italian Grand Prix, a track where Williams expected their cars to have pace, which Albon showed by qualifying 6th. Sargeant was running in 11th before getting a penalty for colliding with Bottas at turn 4 late in the race dropping him down to 13th. As in Canada, Albon defended against faster cars, holding off drivers like Fernando Alonso, Lando Norris and Oscar Piastri to take 7th. Albon had a chance to take 6th when Lewis Hamilton received a penalty for colliding with Oscar Piastri but Hamilton had enough of a gap to avoid dropping behind Albon at the flag. Still, Albon's 7th place allowed Williams to move 10 points ahead of Haas in the fight for 7th in the constructors' championship, handing the team control of that battle.

Sargeant qualified 18th for the Singapore Grand Prix with Albon qualifying 14th. On lap 20 Sargeant hit the wall, damaging his front wing, forcing it to be changed, which ended his chance for points. He just about held Fernando Alonso off to finish 14th. Albon was running in the top 10 until Sergio Pérez hit him late on, damaging his car costing him a possible 10th place. Albon finished 12th. After the race Albon was furious with Pérez, calling him desperate and dirty.

Sargeant crashed in qualifying for the Japanese Grand Prix, forcing him to ask the stewards for permission to race. Due to the team having to rebuild the chassis with parts not from the original car it was deemed to be a third car, forcing Sargeant to start from the pit lane and to serve a ten second time penalty at his first pitstop. Albon qualified 13th. Albon received damage at the start after Bottas pushed him on the grass before turn 1, causing his car to flip onto two wheels before smashing back down again. The impact damaged the car, forcing Albon to pit at the beginning of lap 1. Sargeant receive a penalty for a collision with Bottas on lap 5. The team retired him due to the damage from the collision with Bottas. Albon also retired due to damage from the lap 1 incident which ended a very disappointing race for Williams.

Williams left Japan 7th in the constructors' championship with 21 points. Albon was 13th in the drivers' championship having scored all 21 of those points with Sargeant 20th in the championship, still without a point in his rookie season.

=== Qatar to Abu Dhabi ===
Albon qualified 14th for the Qatar Grand Prix with Sargeant qualifying 16th. Albon qualified 17th for the sprint with Sargeant failing to set a time due to both his lap times being deleted for track limits. Sargeant retired from the sprint race after spinning off into the gravel on lap 5 whilst Albon finished 7th scoring 2 points for the team. Albon finished the race 13th despite two 5 second penalties for track limit violations whilst Sargeant retired due to the extreme conditions giving him heat stroke forcing him to go to the medical centre for checks after he retired despite his best efforts to continue. The team still told him they were proud of him for trying to finish the race under the extreme illness he was feeling.

Albon and Sargeant qualified 18th and 20th respectively for the United States Grand Prix. Sargeant also qualified last for the sprint but Albon qualified 9th for the shorter race. Albon finished 9th in the sprint, just missing out on points whilst Sargeant finished 19th. Albon and Sargeant originally finished the main race 11th and 12th respectively but when Lewis Hamilton and Charles Leclerc were disqualified for plank wear violations both drivers went up two positions. The final classification had Albon finish 9th and Sargeant finish 10th. Sargeant's 10th place marked his first career point and the first points for an American driver since Michael Andretti at the 1993 Italian Grand Prix. Williams left Austin 7th in the constructors' championship with 26 points, with Albon 13th in the drivers' championship with 25 points and Sargeant 20th in the drivers' championship with 1 point.

Albon qualified 14th for the Mexico City Grand Prix whilst Sargeant failed to set a time, forcing him to ask the stewards for permission to race. Sargeant retired due to a fuel pump failure late in the race but Albon benefitted from the red flag after Kevin Magnussen's heavy crash to restart in the top 10 where he stayed, finishing in 9th place. But AlphaTauri had scored big points from Daniel Ricciardo and had closed the gap to Williams in the previous two races meaning Williams' 7th in the constructors' championship was not guaranteed yet.

Sargeant qualified 19th for the São Paulo Grand Prix with Albon qualifying 15th. For the sprint Albon qualified 19th with Sargeant qualifying 20th and last. Albon finished the sprint 15th with Sargeant finishing the shorter race 20th and last. At the start of the main race Albon got a good start but sandwiched Nico Hülkenberg between him and his teammate Kevin Magnussen. Albon collided with Hülkenberg's right front tyre which spun him into Magnussen sending both cars heavily into the barrier at turn 1 causing a red flag. Albon was out on the spot leaving Sargeant to defend Williams' honour. Sargeant fought hard all race for points but just missed out finished 11th. With more points coming from Yuki Tsunoda, AlphaTauri were now 7 points behind Williams, with two races to go setting up a fight for 7th between the two teams. For the first ever Las Vegas Grand Prix, both cars made it into Q3 with Albon qualifying 6th and Sargeant qualifying 7th. But in the race both cars went backwards with Albon finishing 12th and Sargeant finishing 16th. Fortunately for the team, AlphaTauri did not score, leaving the gap between the two teams at 7 points going into the final race.

Albon qualified 14th for the season finale in Abu Dhabi with Sargeant failing to set a time due to repeated track limits violations meaning he would start 20th and last. With this qualifying result Albon became the first driver since Max Verstappen in 2020 to outqualify his teammate at every race during a season. Albon finished the race 14th with Sargeant finishing 16th. Despite neither driver scoring, AlphaTauri could not pass Williams in the constructors' championship as Tsunoda finished in 8th place. Even though the Japanese driver led the race for three laps, his one stop strategy failed to work and he slipped back to 8th place, just missing out on the points required to overtake Williams in the championship.

Williams finished 2023, 7th in the constructors' championship with 28 points, 3 places higher than in 2022. Albon finished 13th in the drivers' championship with 27 points whilst Sargeant finished 21st in the drivers' championship with 1 point. The improved finish is seen as a result of the car's great straight line speed which meant even cars with DRS could not pass the FW45 in a straight line. Examples of this include Albon's brilliant defending in Canada despite being on 49 lap old tyres and Monza where Albon defended from much faster cars like the McLarens to secure 7th in both races. Albon was viewed as essential to Williams' 2023 season with many fans being impressed about how he rebuilt himself after his struggles at Red Bull. Sargeant however had a hard rookie season with the American constantly being under pressure, especially from Zandvoort to Japan where he had multiple crashes that hurt the team's development. There were even reports of Sargeant being dropped and replaced by drivers like Mick Schumacher and Frederik Vesti. Sargeant however, with the point in Austin and fewer crashes from Qatar to Abu Dhabi, convinced the team they could rely on him which in the end got him a contract extension for 2024.

== Sponsorship and livery ==
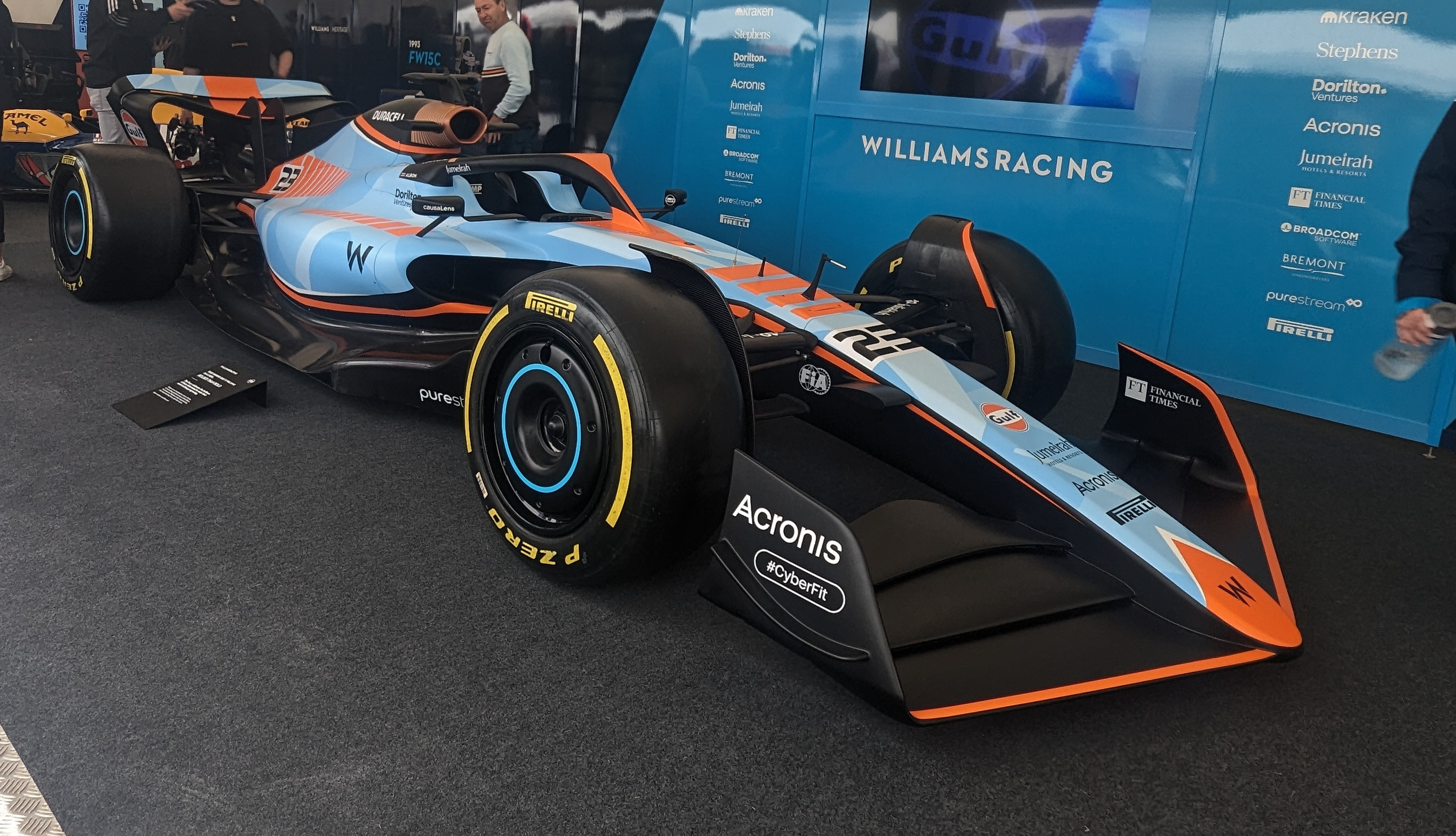
The special Gulf Oil livery used for the Singapore, Japanese and Qatar Grands Prix, pictured on a show car

The livery of the FW45 appears as an evolution of the FW44's, retaining the basic scheme while altering certain decorative elements. The wings are entirely black, with the exception of two stripes adorning the main plane of the front wing. This motif is echoed by a "V" shape on the nose—a feature that, on the 2022 car, was rendered in two colors: red and light blue. The same dual-colored detailing that appeared on the sidepods and engine cover of the FW44 remains, though the shapes and positioning have been adjusted; an additional instance of this design also appears on the sides of the survival cell. The air intake—styled to resemble a Duracell battery (a Williams sponsor) which was featured only during the North American Grands Prix in 2022, was used throughout the entire 2023 season.

For the British Grand Prix, the two FW45 cars featured a special livery to commemorate Williams' 800th Formula 1 Grand Prix entry. This version differs from the standard design by incorporating a reference to the United Kingdom flag on the engine cover, along with commemorative logos on the sidepods and nose. Furthermore, the outer surfaces of the rear wing endplates are finished in white.

For the Singapore, Japanese, and Qatar Grands Prix, the two FW45 cars sported a special livery created in collaboration with sponsor Gulf Oil a design chosen by fans from four different options. It incorporates the classic colors of the American oil company: a light blue base, accented with orange seen in a stripe running along the bottom of the car, on the leading edge of the front wing, and beneath the air intake—as well as dashed orange stripes on the nose, sidepods, and engine cover, along with further detailing on the rear wing and the halo.

== Complete Formula One results ==
Key

Key
Colour	Result
Gold	Winner
Silver	Second place
Bronze	Third place
Green	Other points position
Blue	Other classified position
Blue	Not classified, finished (NC)
Purple	Not classified, retired (Ret)
Red	Did not qualify (DNQ)
Black	Disqualified (DSQ)
White	Did not start (DNS)
White	Race cancelled (C)
Blank	Did not practice (DNP)
Blank	Excluded (EX)
Blank	Did not arrive (DNA)
Blank	Withdrawn (WD)
Blank	Did not enter (empty cell)
Annotation	Meaning
P	Pole position
F	Fastest lap
Superscript number	Points-scoring position in sprint

Year	Entrant	Power unit	Tyres	Driver name	Grands Prix																						Points	WCC pos.
Year	Entrant	Power unit	Tyres	Driver name	BHR	SAU	AUS	AZE	MIA	MON	ESP	CAN	AUT	GBR	HUN	BEL	NED	ITA	SIN	JPN	QAT	USA	MXC	SAP	LVG	ABU	Points	WCC pos.
2023	Williams Racing	Mercedes-AMG F1 M14	P	(Thailand) Alexander Albon	10	Ret	Ret	12	14	14	16	7	11	8	11	14	8	7	11	Ret	13^{7}	9	9	Ret	12	14	28	7th
2023	Williams Racing	Mercedes-AMG F1 M14	P	(United States) Logan Sargeant	12	16	16†	16	20	18	20	Ret	13	11	18†	17	Ret	13	14	Ret	Ret	10	16†	11	16	16	28	7th
