= Williams FW43 =

2020–2021 Formula One racing car

Williams FW43 Williams FW43B
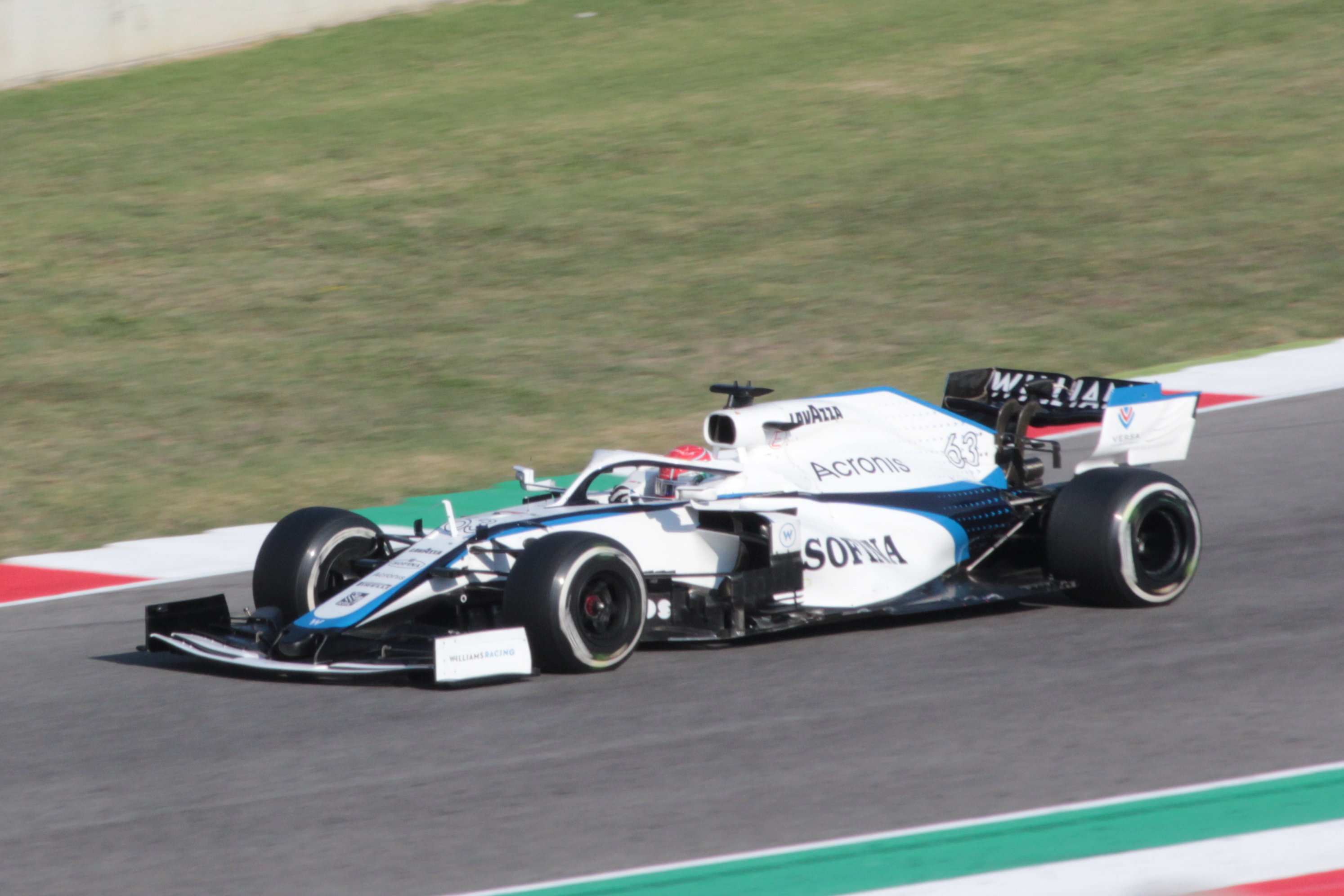
- The Williams FW43 in its updated livery, driven by George Russell during the Tuscan Grand Prix
- Category: Formula One
- Constructor: Williams
- Designers: Doug McKiernan (Design and Development Director); David Wheater (Aerodynamics Director); Adam Carter (Chief Engineer); David Worner (Chief Designer); Jonathan Carter (Head of Design); Dave Robson (Head of Vehicle Performance)
- Predecessor: Williams FW42
- Successor: Williams FW44

Technical specifications
- Engine: Mercedes M11 EQ Performance (2020); Mercedes-AMG F1 M12 E Performance (2021) 1.6 L (98 cu in) direct injection V6 turbocharged engine limited to 15,000 RPM in a mid-mounted, rear-wheel drive layout
- Transmission: eight forward and 1 reverse gear seamless sequential semi-automatic shift plus reverse gear, gear selection electro-hydraulically actuated
- Fuel: Petronas Primax
- Tyres: Pirelli P Zero (dry); Pirelli Cinturato (wet)

Competition history
- Notable entrants: Williams Racing
- Notable drivers: 6. (Canada) Nicholas Latifi; 63. (United Kingdom) George Russell; 89. (United Kingdom) Jack Aitken
- Debut: 2020 Austrian Grand Prix
- Last event: 2021 Abu Dhabi Grand Prix
Races	Wins	Podiums	Poles	F/Laps
39	0	1	0	0

The Williams FW43 is a Formula One car constructed by Williams to compete in the 2020 Formula One World Championship. The car was driven by Nicholas Latifi and George Russell, who were in their first and second year with the team respectively. Jack Aitken, Roy Nissany, Jamie Chadwick and Dan Ticktum acted as reserve and development drivers for the team.

One of these reserve drivers, Jack Aitken, made his Grand Prix debut in the FW43 at the 2020 Sakhir Grand Prix, replacing George Russell who was called up by Mercedes for the same event after Mercedes' regular driver, Lewis Hamilton, tested positive for coronavirus and was forced to miss the event as a result. Russell returned to Williams for the season finale in Abu Dhabi after Hamilton was cleared to race for Mercedes in that event with Aitken returning to reserve driver.

The car was designed by Doug McKiernan and Dave Wheater with new recruits David Worner and Jonathan Carter acting as Chief Designer and Deputy Chief Designer respectively. The car was planned to make its competitive debut at the 2020 Australian Grand Prix, but this was delayed when several races were postponed or cancelled in response to the COVID-19 pandemic. The FW43 made its debut at the 2020 Austrian Grand Prix.

The pandemic also prompted the delay of technical regulations that had been planned for introduction in 2021. Under an agreement reached between teams and the Fédération Internationale de l'Automobile, 2020-specification cars—including the FW43—saw their lifespan extended to compete in 2021. Williams introduced the FW43B for use in 2021.

== Initial design ==
The car was designed by David Worner and Jonathan Carter, both of whom are in their first year in the team having previously worked with Red Bull and Renault respectively. Williams have described the FW43 as being an evolution of its predecessor, believing the FW42 was a good basis on which to design the FW43.

Several major changes were made regarding the side pods. Firstly the car introduced a steep slope from the top of the side pod to the floor to encourage the air to reach the floor of the car. This has drawn parallels with the side pod designs seen on the Red Bull RB8 and Sauber C31 seen in 2012. Williams have also reduced the size of the air inlets on the front of the side pods and have flattened the outer surface of the side pod. The wing mirror and wing mirror supports have also seen aerodynamic refinement.

== 2020 pre-season ==
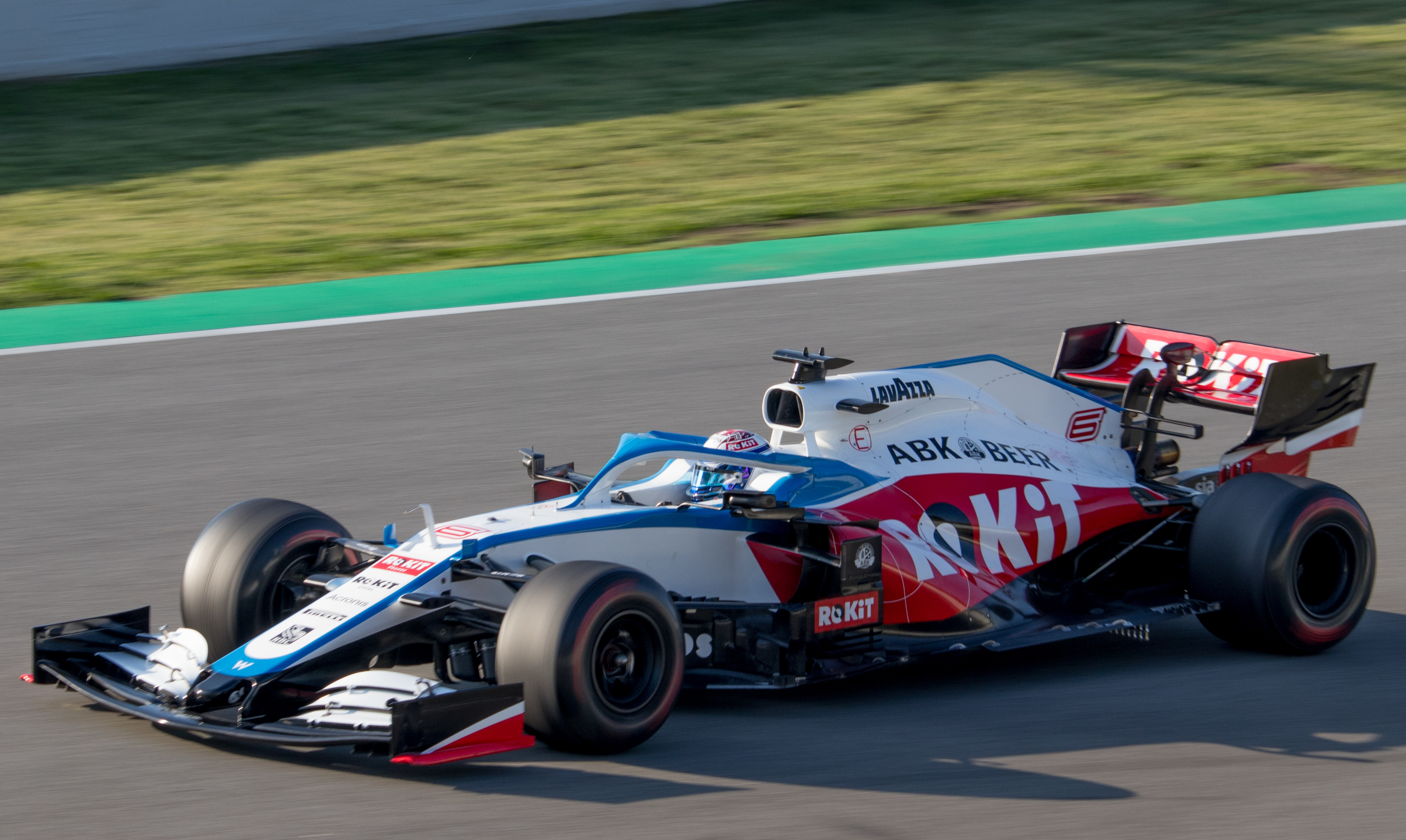
An FW43 in its original livery, driven by Latifi during pre-season testing.

After experiencing their worst season in the team's history, which included missing the first two days of pre-season testing in 2019, testing for the 2020 season went much more smoothly for Williams. George Russell commented that he believed that Williams still had the slowest car after the team finished last in the preceding season, but that it was an improvement on its predecessor, the FW42.

The FW43 appeared in pre-season testing with a red, white and blue livery branded with the logo of the team's title sponsor, telecommunications company ROKiT. However, in late May, prior to the start of the delayed 2020 season, the team announced that the title sponsorship arrangement with ROKiT had been terminated and that a new livery would be revealed before the first race.

== Competition history ==
=== FW43 ===
Russell and Latifi qualified 17th and 20th respectively for the season-opening Austrian Grand Prix. Russell retired from the race with a fuel pressure issue, having been running in 13th place, whilst Latifi finished last of the running cars in 11th. Deputy team principal Claire Williams remarked that the team's performance marked a "turning point" in comparison to their difficult 2019 campaign. Russell started 11th at the Styrian Grand Prix after a rain-affected qualifying session, narrowly missing out on Q3. This marked Williams' first Q2 appearance since the 2018 Brazilian Grand Prix and the team's best starting grid position since the 2018 Italian Grand Prix. Although the car was an improvement in pace over the FW42, Williams failed to score a single point in a season primarily due to its high sensitivity while running behind other cars. Russell had good opportunities to score points, most notably at the Tuscan Grand Prix where Russell was running in 9th for long periods before ultimately finishing 11th and the Emilia Romagna Grand Prix, where he crashed under the safety car whilst running 10th and in the points. In the end Williams finished in 11th place in 4 races: the Austrian, Italian, Tuscan and Emilia Romagna GPs, 3 courtesy of Latifi, and 1 from Russell. This would be the first time since 1976 where Williams finished pointless in an F1 season.

=== FW43B ===
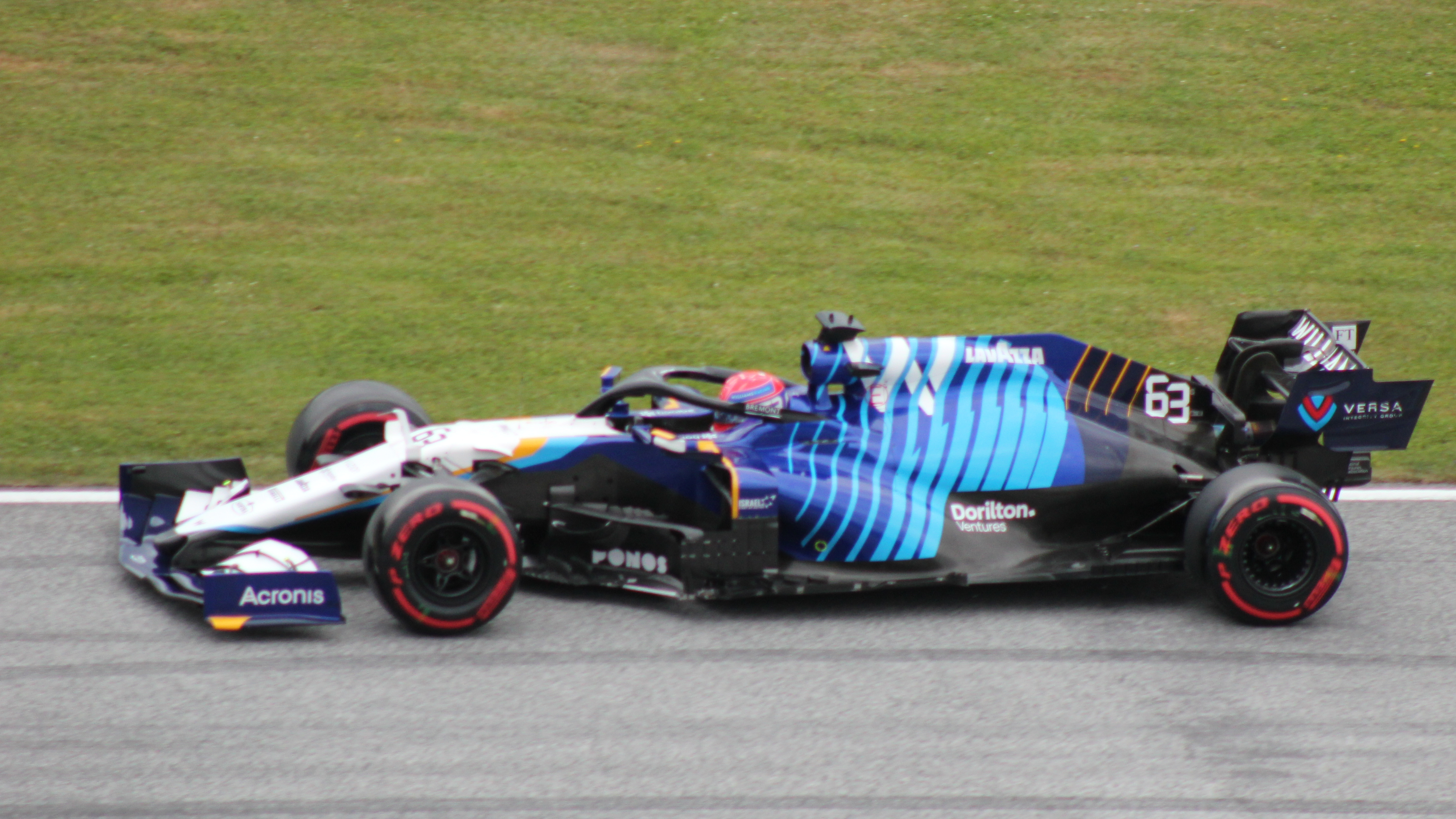
George Russell in the FW43B during practice at the Austrian Grand Prix

In March 2021, Williams introduced the FW43B, designed to compete in the 2021 season. The car had its first shakedown in February 2021 at Silverstone with George Russell and Nicholas Latifi behind the wheel. Roy Nissany drove the car during the first two days of pre-season testing. He also drove the car during the first practice session of the 2021 Spanish Grand Prix. Originally, the car was to be introduced in a special AR mobile app where fans could see the car in their tables or garage, but prior to the launch, the app was hacked. Thus, Williams decided to cancel the app. The car's livery pays homage to Williams' successful past, and to Sir Frank Williams, who founded the team, but left it after the 2020 Italian Grand Prix. The FW43B is the first car to compete in a full season without the Williams family managing the team. The car made its debut in the Bahrain Grand Prix. At the Emilia Romagna Grand Prix, both Latifi and Russell retired, after contact with Nikita Mazepin and Valtteri Bottas respectively.

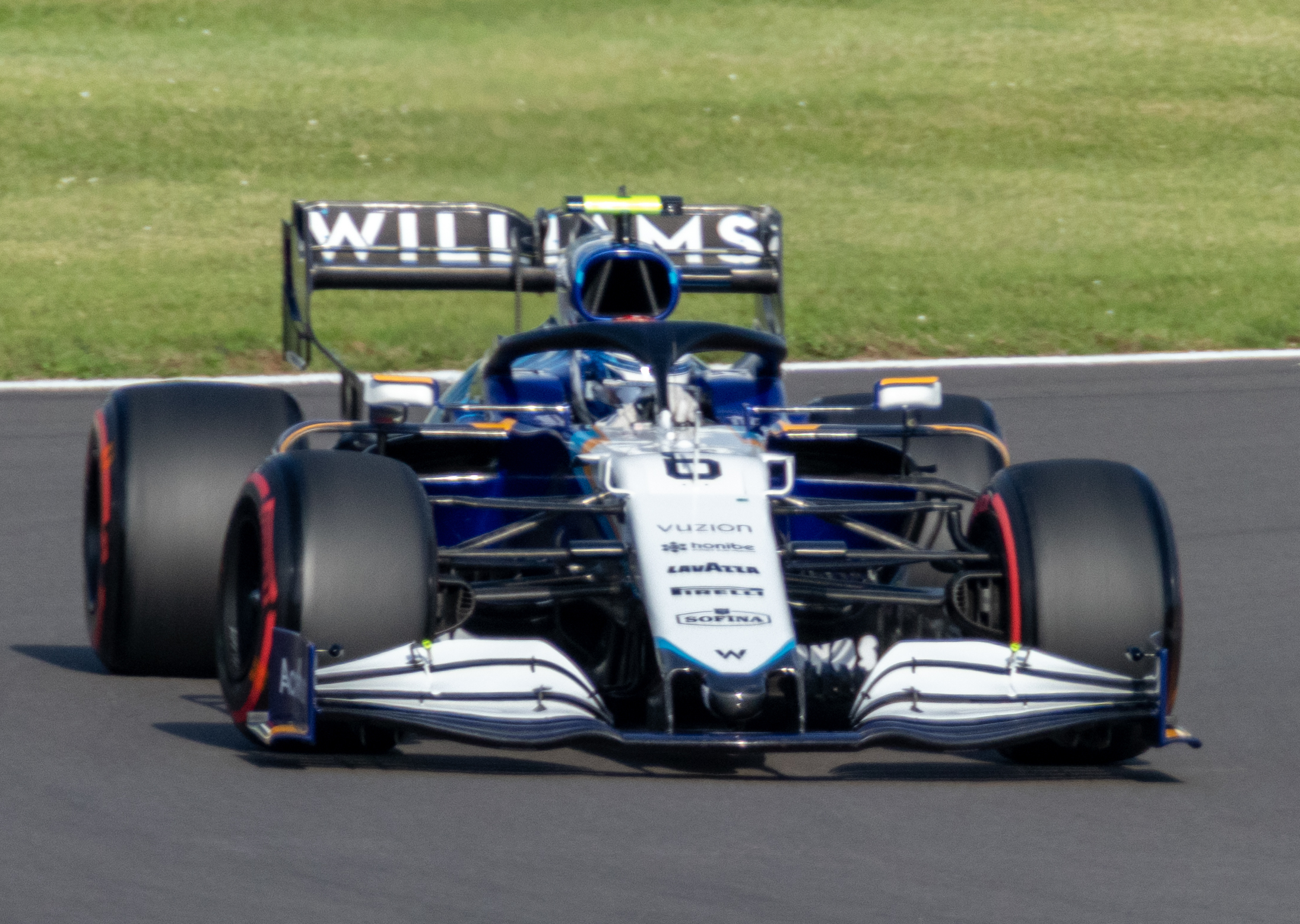
Latifi at the British Grand Prix

The car represented a strong step forward in qualifying and race pace to its predecessor, with Russell regularly challenging for top 10 qualifying positions, and the team narrowly missing out on points scoring positions towards the middle of the season at France and Austria. The team finally scored their first points of the season at the Hungarian Grand Prix, with Latifi and Russell finishing 8th and 9th on the road, respectively, before being promoted one place up each following Sebastian Vettel's disqualification. The result brought in 10 points and allowed the team to leapfrog Haas and Alfa Romeo to 8th place in the Constructors' Championship.

At the next race in Belgium, Russell qualified 2nd on the grid following a stunning final lap in a chaotic wet session. The following day, conditions meant that the race was delayed, ran for 3 laps under safety car conditions and then red flagged - Russell was classified in the same position, whilst Latifi benefitted from pre-race penalties to be classified 9th. Thus, Williams scored their first podium since the 2017 Azerbaijan Grand Prix, double points for the second consecutive race, and doubled their points tally to 20 points (half points awarded) to take a stranglehold over 8th in the Championship moving the team 17 points clear of the nearest rivals Alfa Romeo.

Three races later in Russia, Russell yet again took advantage of changeable weather conditions to take 3rd in qualifying. He would finish 10th in the race which would prove to be his last points finish for Williams and Williams' last point for the rest of the season.

== Livery ==
2021 was the final year for the Ayrton Senna tribute logo being presented on the front wing, which was used on every Williams car since 1995.

At the 2021 Bahrain Grand Prix, the team paid tribute to the legendary Formula One commentator, Murray Walker, who died a week before the race; his quote "And I've got to stop, because I've got a lump in my throat" was carried on the halo device. At the 2021 Monaco Grand Prix, the team celebrated their 750th Grand Prix with the logo on the engine cover and 100 fans present on the halo device. At the 2021 Saudi Arabian Grand Prix, the team paid tribute to their founder, Sir Frank Williams, who died a week before the race. To honour him, Williams ran the logo of their predecessor, Frank Williams Racing Cars, behind the sidepods; this time, the message on the halo device read "I feel the need, the need for speed", a reference from the film Top Gun.

== Complete Formula One results ==
(key)

Year	Entrant	Chassis	Power unit	Tyres	Driver name	Grands Prix																						Points	WCC
2020	Williams Racing	FW43	Mercedes-AMG F1 M11 EQ Performance; 1.6 V6 t	P		AUT	STY	HUN	GBR	70A	ESP	BEL	ITA	TUS	RUS	EIF	POR	EMI	TUR	BHR	SKH	ABU						0	10th
2020	Williams Racing	FW43	Mercedes-AMG F1 M11 EQ Performance; 1.6 V6 t	P	(Canada) Nicholas Latifi	11	17	19	15	19	18	16	11	Ret	16	14	18	11	Ret	14	Ret	17						0	10th
2020	Williams Racing	FW43	Mercedes-AMG F1 M11 EQ Performance; 1.6 V6 t	P	(United Kingdom) George Russell	Ret	16	18	12	18	17	Ret	14	11	18	Ret	14	Ret	16	12		15						0	10th
2020	Williams Racing	FW43	Mercedes-AMG F1 M11 EQ Performance; 1.6 V6 t	P	(United Kingdom) Jack Aitken																16							0	10th
2021	Williams Racing	FW43B	Mercedes-AMG F1 M12 E Performance; 1.6 V6 t	P		BHR	EMI	POR	ESP	MON	AZE	FRA	STY	AUT	GBR	HUN	BEL^{‡}	NED	ITA	RUS	TUR	USA	MXC	SAP	QAT	SAU	ABU	23	8th
2021	Williams Racing	FW43B	Mercedes-AMG F1 M12 E Performance; 1.6 V6 t	P	(Canada) Nicholas Latifi	18†	Ret	18	16	15	16	18	17	16	14	7	9	16	11	19†	17	15	17	16	Ret	12	Ret	23	8th
2021	Williams Racing	FW43B	Mercedes-AMG F1 M12 E Performance; 1.6 V6 t	P	(United Kingdom) George Russell	14	Ret	16	14	14	17†	12	Ret	11	12	8	2	17†	9	10	15	14	16	13	17	Ret	Ret	23	8th

Notes

- ^{†} Driver failed to finish the race, but was classified as they had completed over 90% of the winner's race distance.
- ^{‡} Half points awarded as less than 75% of race distance completed.
