= Williams FW46 =

2024 Formula One car

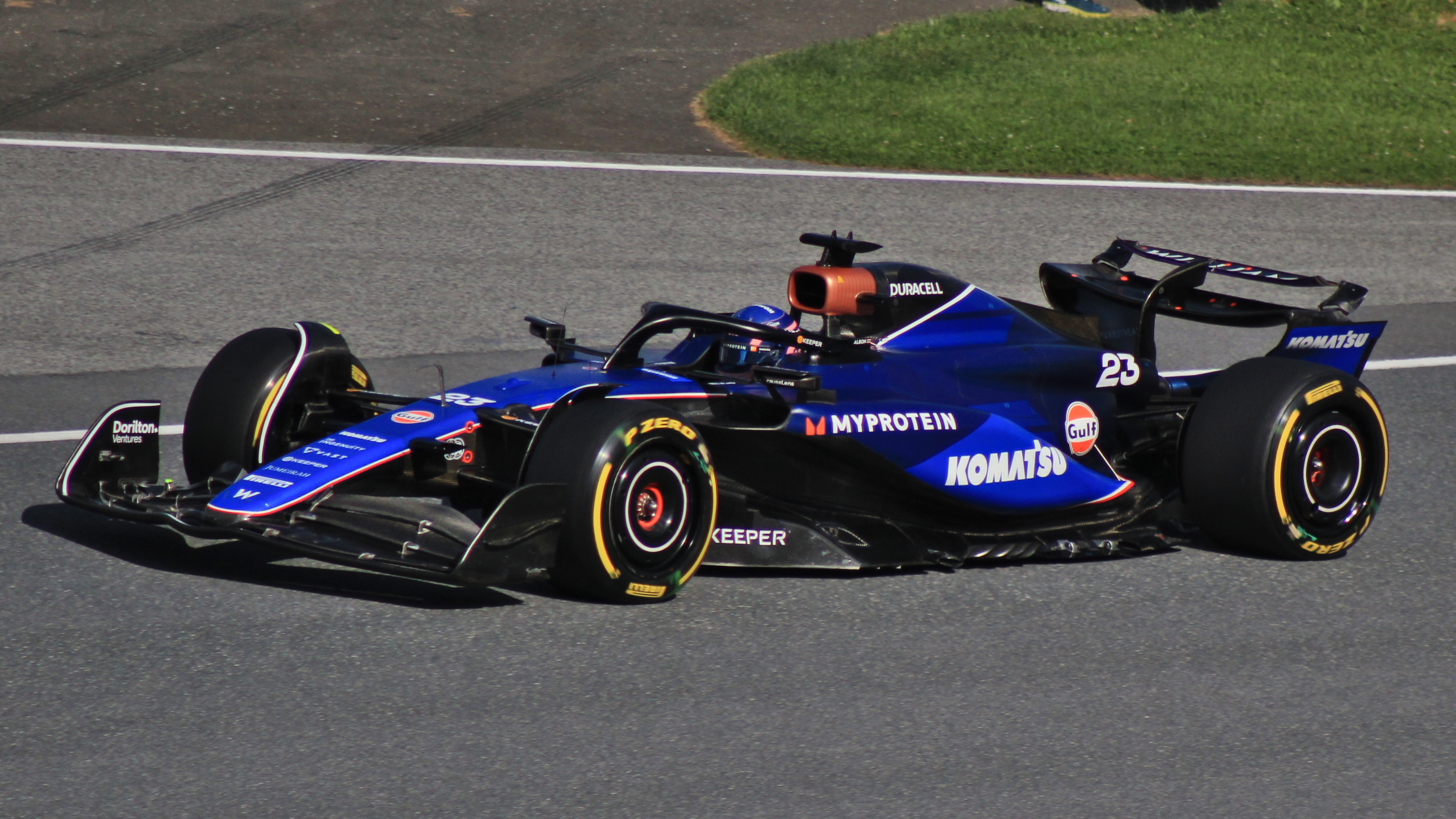
- An FW46 driven by Alexander Albon during the Austrian Grand Prix
- Category: Formula One
- Constructor: Williams
- Designers: Pat Fry (Chief Technical Officer); David Worner (Design Director); Jonathan Carter (Deputy Chief Designer); Steve Winstanley (Chief Engineer, Composites and Structures); Dave Robson (Head of Vehicle Performance; Adam Kenyon (Chief Aerodynamicist)
- Predecessor: Williams FW45
- Successor: Williams FW47

Technical specifications
- Chassis: Carbon-fibre monocoque, laminated from carbon epoxy and honeycomb
- Suspension (front): Double wishbone, push-rod activated springs and anti-roll bar
- Suspension (rear): Double wishbone, pull-rod activated springs and anti-roll bar
- Engine: Mercedes-AMG M15 E Performance 1.6 L (98 cu in) direct injection V6 turbocharged engine limited to 15,000 RPM in a mid-mounted, rear-wheel drive layout
- Electric motor: Kinetic and thermal energy recovery systems
- Transmission: Mercedes-AMG 8 forward + 1 reverse gear seamless sequential semi-automatic shift plus reverse gear, gear selection electro-hydraulically actuated
- Battery: Lithium-ion battery
- Fuel: Gulf
- Lubricants: Gulf
- Tyres: Pirelli P Zero (dry); Pirelli Cinturato (wet)

Competition history
- Notable entrants: Williams Racing
- Notable drivers: 2. (United States) Logan Sargeant; 23. (Thailand) Alexander Albon; 43. (Argentina) Franco Colapinto
- Debut: 2024 Bahrain Grand Prix
- Last event: 2024 Abu Dhabi Grand Prix
Races	Wins	Podiums	Poles	F/Laps
24	0	0	0	0

The Williams FW46 is a Formula One racing car designed and constructed by Williams to compete in the 2024 Formula One World Championship. The car was driven by Alexander Albon, Logan Sargeant and Franco Colapinto, the latter of whom replaced Sargeant for the final nine races of the season. Throughout the season, which was riddled with numerous incidents, the team scored 17 points.

== Design and development ==
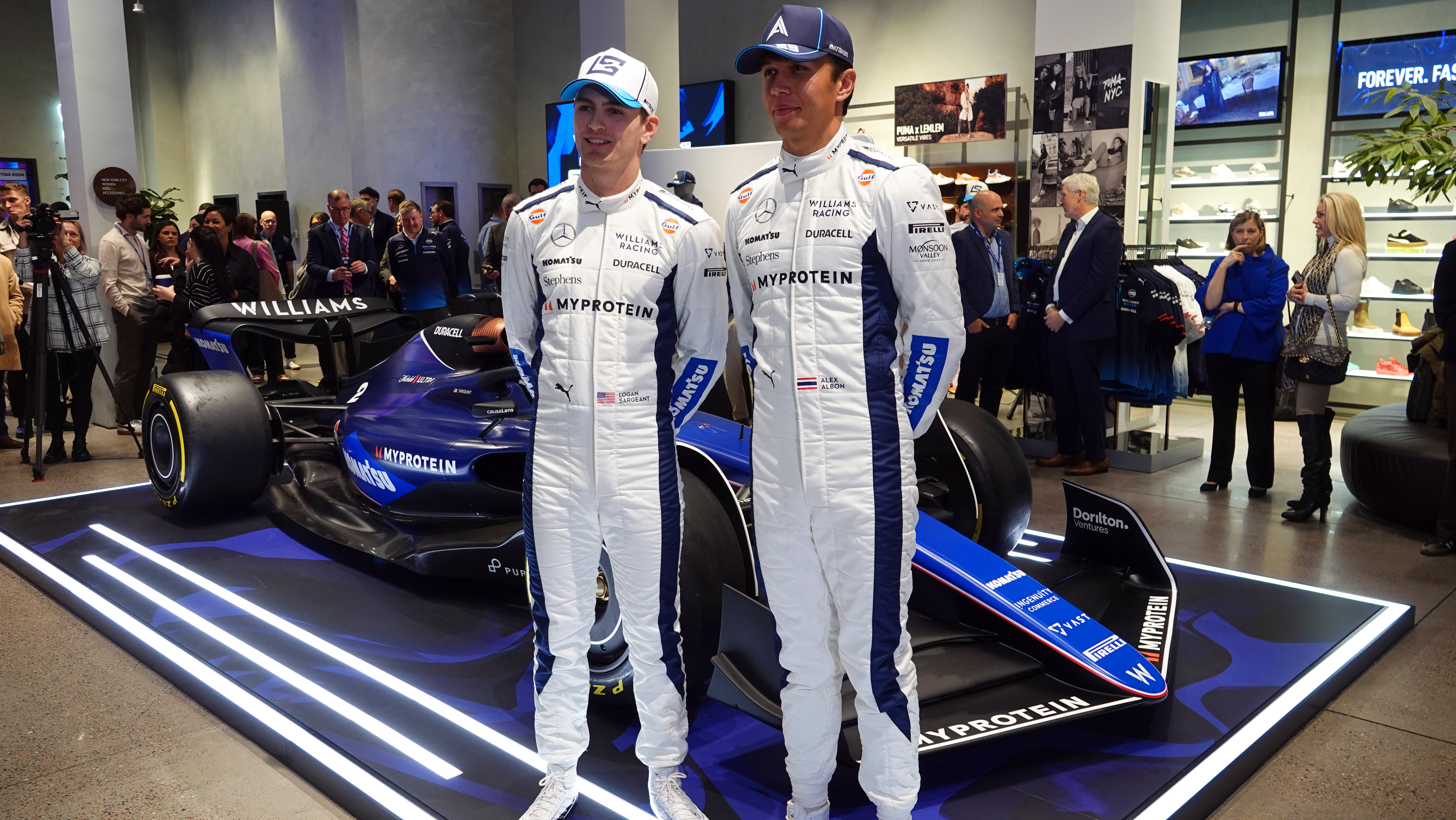
Sargeant and Albon revealing the FW46 in New York City

The FW46 was first revealed on 5 February 2024. It featured a livery largely similar to the one run on the FW44 and FW45 cars. The car is Williams' first to utilise an on-wheel multi-function display (MFD), the previous cars having the display set on the chassis itself.

Williams changed their car manufacturing process for 2024 in an attempt to modernise its systems. This meant that Williams initially had to produce metal car parts to save time, instead of the carbon fiber that modern Formula One cars are built out of. However, this actually led to them exceeding the weight limit, and the team was losing 0.45 seconds a lap. Additionally, the usage of metal parts resulted in heavier crash damage.

Williams has raced special liveries on the FW46. For the Mexico City and São Paulo Grands Prix, Williams introduced a special Mercado Libre livery to commemorate its newfound partnership with the Argentine online marketplace. Mercado Libre became an official partner of Williams after the signing of Franco Colapinto.

== Livery ==
The livery for the FW46 saw minor changes from the FW45. The engine cover design featured a tribute to the Frank Williams Racing Cars logo.

Williams raced a special "championship yellow" livery in collaboration with Mercado Libre for the Mexico City and São Paulo Grands Prix and with Keeper Security for the Las Vegas Grand Prix. For the United States Grand Prix, Williams raced a fan-chosen rear wing livery in collaboration with Kraken.

== Season summary ==
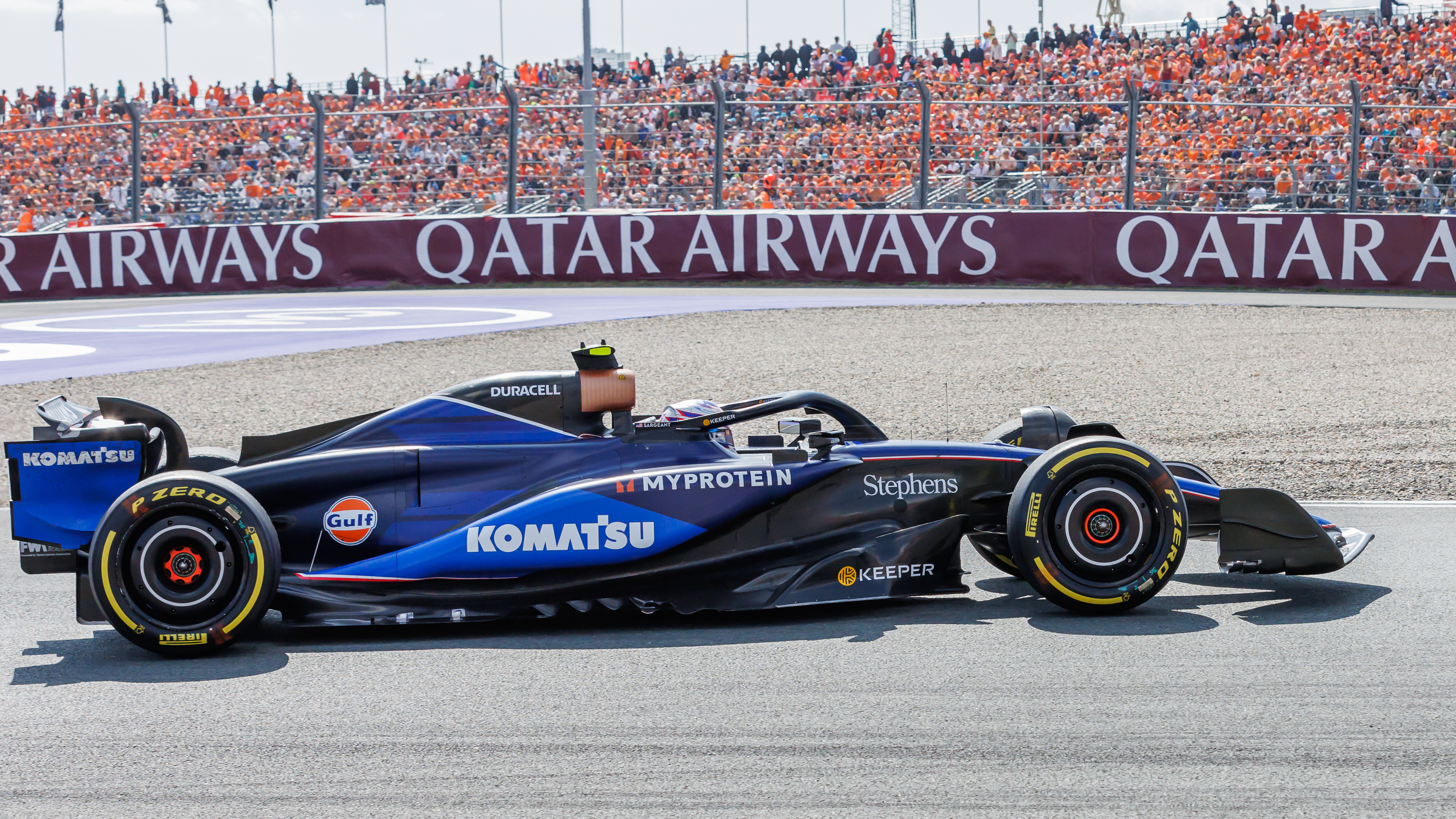
Sargeant at the Dutch Grand Prix, his last race for the team

At the season opener at the Bahrain International Circuit, Albon and Sargeant qualified 13th and 18th respectively, finishing in 15th and 20th. At the Saudi Arabian Grand Prix, the drivers started 12th and 19th and finished in 11th and 14th. As there was no spare chassis available, Sargeant withdrew from the Australian Grand Prix to allow teammate Albon to use his chassis; Albon had crashed heavily in practice and the team were unable to repair his car. Albon ultimately finished in twelfth. Sargeant damaged the repaired chassis in the following Japanese Grand Prix during the first free practice session.

Sargeant was dropped from the Italian Grand Prix onwards with Williams Academy driver Franco Colapinto stepping up from his Formula 2 campaign to take his place for the remainder of the season. At Azerbaijan Grand Prix, the team achieved their first double-points finish of the season with Albon in seventh and Colapinto in eighth. In the process, Colapinto became the first Argentine driver since Carlos Reutemann to score points in 1982.

== Complete Formula One results ==
Key

Key
Colour	Result
Gold	Winner
Silver	Second place
Bronze	Third place
Green	Other points position
Blue	Other classified position
Blue	Not classified, finished (NC)
Purple	Not classified, retired (Ret)
Red	Did not qualify (DNQ)
Black	Disqualified (DSQ)
White	Did not start (DNS)
White	Race cancelled (C)
Blank	Did not practice (DNP)
Blank	Excluded (EX)
Blank	Did not arrive (DNA)
Blank	Withdrawn (WD)
Blank	Did not enter (empty cell)
Annotation	Meaning
P	Pole position
F	Fastest lap
Superscript number	Points-scoring position in sprint

Year	Entrant	Engine	Tyres	Drivers	Grands Prix																								Points	WCC
Year	Entrant	Engine	Tyres	Drivers	BHR	SAU	AUS	JPN	CHN	MIA	EMI	MON	CAN	ESP	AUT	GBR	HUN	BEL	NED	ITA	AZE	SIN	USA	MXC	SAP	LVG	QAT	ABU	Points	WCC
2024	Williams Racing	Mercedes-AMG; F1 M15 E Performance; 1.6 V6 t	P	(Thailand) Alex Albon	15	11	11	Ret	12	18	Ret	9	Ret	18	15	9	14	12	14	9	7	Ret	16	Ret	DNS	Ret	15	11	17	9th
2024	Williams Racing	Mercedes-AMG; F1 M15 E Performance; 1.6 V6 t	P	(United States) Logan Sargeant	20	14	WD	17	17	Ret	17	15	Ret	20	19	11	17	17	16										17	9th
2024	Williams Racing	Mercedes-AMG; F1 M15 E Performance; 1.6 V6 t	P	(Argentina) Franco Colapinto																12	8	11	10	12	Ret	14	Ret	Ret	17	9th
