= Williams FW47 =

2025 Formula One car

- Alexander Albon driving the FW47 during the Austrian Grand Prix
- Category: Formula One
- Constructor: Williams
- Designers: Pat Fry (Chief Technical Officer); David Worner (Engineering Director); Dave Robson (Chief Engineer); Steve Winstanley (Chief Engineer, Composites and Structures); Fabrice Moncade (Chief Engineer - Vehicle Dynamics & Computer Science); Matt Harman (Design Director); Jonathan Carter (Deputy Chief Designer); Richard Frith (Head of Performance Systems); Adam Kenyon (Head of Aerodynamics); Juan Molina (Chief Aerodynamicist)
- Predecessor: Williams FW46
- Successor: Williams FW48

Technical specifications
- Chassis: Carbon-fibre monocoque, laminated from carbon epoxy and honeycomb
- Suspension (front): Double wishbone, push-rod activated springs and anti-roll bar
- Suspension (rear): Double wishbone, push-rod activated springs and anti-roll bar
- Engine: Mercedes-AMG M16 E Performance 1.6 L (98 cu in) direct injection V6 turbocharged engine limited to 15,000 RPM in a mid-mounted, rear-wheel drive layout
- Electric motor: Kinetic and thermal energy recovery systems
- Transmission: Mercedes-AMG 8 forward + 1 reverse gear seamless sequential semi-automatic shift plus reverse gear, gear selection electro-hydraulically actuated
- Battery: Lithium-ion battery
- Weight: 800 kg (including driver, excluding fuel)
- Fuel: Gulf
- Lubricants: Gulf
- Tyres: Pirelli P Zero (dry); Pirelli Cinturato (wet)

Competition history
- Notable entrants: Williams Racing
- Notable drivers: 23. (Thailand) Alexander Albon; 55. (Spain) Carlos Sainz Jr.
- Debut: 2025 Australian Grand Prix
- Last event: 2025 Abu Dhabi Grand Prix
Races	Wins	Podiums	Poles	F/Laps
24	0	2	0	1

The Williams FW47 was a Formula One racing car designed and constructed by Williams which competed in the 2025 Formula One World Championship. The car was driven by Alexander Albon and Carlos Sainz Jr., both in their fourth and first seasons with the team respectively. A remarkable improvement over its predecessor, the FW47 scored two Grand Prix podiums, one Grand Prix fastest lap and one sprint podium, all podiums being scored by new signee Sainz.

== Background ==
=== Livery ===
The car was launched on 14 February 2025 at Silverstone Circuit in a one-off camo livery; it was driven by Sainz.

The 2025 livery was unveiled on 18 February 2025 at the F1 75 Live event at The O2 Arena with the other teams. The team has raced with three special liveries: one at the United States Grand Prix which paid homage to the team's partnership with BMW, one at the São Paulo Grand Prix in partnership with Gulf Oil, and one at the Las Vegas Grand Prix that featured Atlassian's Rovo toolset.

== Competition and development history ==
During pre-season testing at Bahrain International Circuit, new signee Sainz set the fastest time of 1:29.348.

The Australian Grand Prix saw both Williams cars enter Q3, with Albon qualifying sixth and Sainz tenth. However, Sainz experienced a torque issue with his car that sent him into the wall and into retirement. The lone Williams of Albon finished in fifth, the team's highest finishing result since the rain-affected 2021 Belgian Grand Prix.

At the Chinese Grand Prix, Albon qualified ninth and Sainz thirteenth for the sprint race; neither car finished in the points as Albon finished eleventh and Sainz in seventeenth. During qualifying, Albon got into Q3, qualifying tenth while Sainz was knocked out in Q2 in fifteenth. On race day Albon briefly led the race on lap 16, the first time a Williams had led a race since the 2015 British Grand Prix by Valtteri Bottas; after the race, Albon initially finished ninth and Sainz twelfth, however a post race disqualification for both Ferraris of Lewis Hamilton and Charles Leclerc and Pierre Gasly's Alpine would promote both Albon and Sainz to seventh and tenth respectively, scoring their first double points since the 2024 Azerbaijan Grand Prix where both cars finished seventh and eighth.

Sainz took fifth at the Las Vegas Grand Prix, a race where the team sported a special livery. The Spaniard achieved two podium finishes that season.

In Japan, Albon got into Q3, qualifying ninth and Sainz qualified twelfth but received a 3-place grid penalty for impeding Lewis Hamilton on his final run in Q2, thus dropping Sainz down to fifteenth. In the race, Albon finished ninth and Sainz finished fourteenth.

At the Bahrain Grand Prix, Sainz got into Q3 for the second time in 2025, in eighth, but Albon was out in Q2, qualifying fifteenth. On race day, Sainz sustained collision damage following his contact with the Red Bull of Yuki Tsunoda on lap 31, resulting in a retirement for Sainz. Albon finished twelfth just behind the Mercedes of Kimi Antonelli.

Later in the season, by qualifying second for the Azerbaijan Grand Prix, Sainz claimed the best qualifying result for Williams since 2021. He went on to finish third, achieving Williams' first podium since the 2021 Belgian Grand Prix. He then proceeded to claim his second podium in the season by finishing third once again at the Qatar Grand Prix. Albon claimed his maiden fastest lap at the São Paulo Grand Prix.

And thus, this was Williams' best season since 2017 where they finished fifth in the standings 2017 Formula One World Championship as their points tally was higher than in 2018-2024 combined.

== Complete Formula One results ==
Key

Key
Colour	Result
Gold	Winner
Silver	Second place
Bronze	Third place
Green	Other points position
Blue	Other classified position
Blue	Not classified, finished (NC)
Purple	Not classified, retired (Ret)
Red	Did not qualify (DNQ)
Black	Disqualified (DSQ)
White	Did not start (DNS)
White	Race cancelled (C)
Blank	Did not practice (DNP)
Blank	Excluded (EX)
Blank	Did not arrive (DNA)
Blank	Withdrawn (WD)
Blank	Did not enter (empty cell)
Annotation	Meaning
P	Pole position
F	Fastest lap
Superscript number	Points-scoring position in sprint

Year	Entrant	Engine	Tyres	Drivers	Grands Prix																								Points	WCC pos.
Year	Entrant	Engine	Tyres	Drivers	AUS	CHN	JPN	BHR	SAU	MIA	EMI	MON	ESP	CAN	AUT	GBR	BEL	HUN	NED	ITA	AZE	SIN	USA	MXC	SAP	LVG	QAT	ABU	Points	WCC pos.
2025	Williams Racing	Mercedes-AMG; F1 M16 E Performance; 1.6 V6 t	P	(Thailand) Alex Albon	5	7	9	12	9	5	5	9	Ret	Ret	Ret	8	6	15	5	7	13	14	14^{6}	12	11^{F}	Ret	11	16	137	5th
2025	Williams Racing	Mercedes-AMG; F1 M16 E Performance; 1.6 V6 t	P	(Spain) Carlos Sainz Jr.	Ret	10	14	Ret	8	9	8	10	14	10	DNS	12	18^{6}	14	13	11	3	10	Ret^{3}	17†	13	5	3^{8}	13	137	5th
