= Williams FW42 =

2019 Formula One car

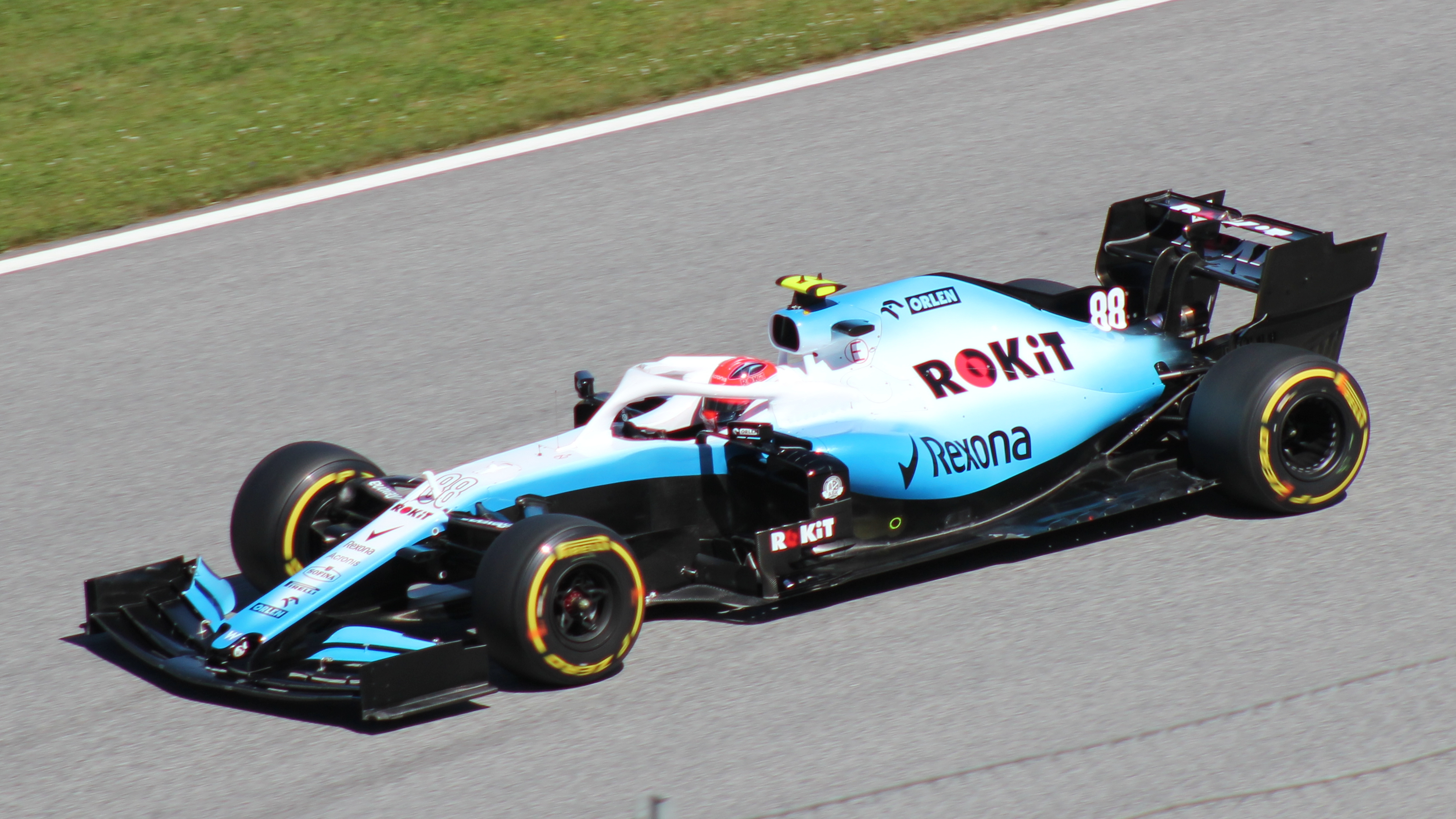
- Robert Kubica driving the FW42 at the Austrian Grand Prix
- Category: Formula One
- Constructor: Williams
- Designers: Paddy Lowe (Chief Technical Officer); Doug McKiernan (Chief Engineer); David Wheater (Aerodynamics Director); Clive Cooper (Head of Design - Composites and Structures); Doug Neville (Head of Design - Mechanical); Richard Ashford (Head of Design - Transmission)
- Predecessor: Williams FW41
- Successor: Williams FW43

Technical specifications
- Chassis: Carbon-fibre monocoque, laminated from carbon epoxy and honeycomb
- Suspension (front): Upper and lower wishbones, inboard springs and dampers actuated by push-rods
- Suspension (rear): Upper and lower wishbones, inboard springs and dampers actuated by pull-rods
- Engine: Mercedes M10 EQ Power+ 1.6 L (98 cu in) direct injection V6 turbocharged engine limited to 15,000 RPM in a mid-mounted, rear-wheel drive layout
- Electric motor: Mercedes kinetic and thermal energy recovery systems
- Transmission: Williams eight speed seamless sequential semi-automatic shift plus reverse gear, gear selection electro-hydraulically actuated
- Fuel: Petronas Primax and PKN Orlen
- Lubricants: Petronas Syntium and Tutela
- Brakes: AP 6 piston front and 4 piston rear calipers with carbon discs and pads
- Tyres: Pirelli P Zero (dry); Pirelli Cinturato (wet); Dicastal forged magnesium wheels: 13"

Competition history
- Notable entrants: ROKiT Williams Racing
- Notable drivers: 63. (United Kingdom) George Russell; 88. (Poland) Robert Kubica
- Debut: 2019 Australian Grand Prix
- Last event: 2019 Abu Dhabi Grand Prix
Races	Wins	Podiums	Poles	F/Laps
21	0	0	0	0

The Williams FW42 was a Formula One racing car designed by Paddy Lowe, Doug McKiernan and Dave Wheater for the ROKiT Williams Racing team, to compete in the 2019 FIA Formula One World Championship. The car made its competitive debut at the 2019 Australian Grand Prix, driven by the reigning 2018 FIA Formula 2 Champion George Russell who was making his Formula One début; and Robert Kubica, who returned for his first racing season in Formula One since 2010, after recovering from life-threatening injuries suffered in a rally car accident in early 2011.

The car notably suffered with build quality problems, poor performance, and reliability issues, making it the worst Williams car and the worst car of the entire 2019 grid.

== Development and testing ==
The Williams FW42 was forced to miss the first two days of pre-season testing as the car had not been completed in time. The car finally got out on track during the middle of the third day of testing, and its first shakedown was performed by Russell who completed 23 laps. Throughout the remaining days of testing the team mostly conducted aero tests, with the drivers running a limited number of flying laps due to setbacks in the car's development, lack of parts, and the track time lost during the team's absence during the first two and a half days of testing. The car completed 567 laps during the tests, the fewest of any teams, and was unable to match the pace of other competitors. Its fastest time was 1.9 seconds slower than the quickest lap of testing posted by Sebastian Vettel driving for Ferrari, and over half a second behind the rest of the grid.

== Competition history ==
The car arrived on the season opener in Australia with re-designed parts of the front suspension, bargeboards, and mirrors after those elements of the car were declared illegal by the FIA during the pre-season testing. During the first two practice sessions, the car presented itself with very slow pace, and was even further down the grid than during the winter testing. On Saturday there was no improvement, as both drivers qualified on the back of the grid, with Russell in front of Kubica but three seconds behind the McLaren of Carlos Sainz. The race was a disaster for the team, as both drivers crossed the line adrift of the field with George Russell and Robert Kubica taking respectively the 16th and 17th spot, capitalizing only on three drivers who didn't finish the race. The team found no success during the first half of the season despite upgrades to the car. It wasn't until Germany that they finally broke through with Kubica finishing 10th and scoring their first point of the season, capitalising on 7 drivers that failed to complete the full race distance and after both Alfa Romeo drivers (who finished 7th and 8th) received severe time penalties for driver aids at the start of the race.

At the Hungarian Grand Prix, Williams showed signs of progress after Russell narrowly missed out on Q2, and was able to carry this progress into the race. The following round saw Kubica failing to qualify because of an engine failure and having to start from the pit lane while Russell started 14th on the grid because of multiple drivers taking grid penalties despite qualifying 19th.

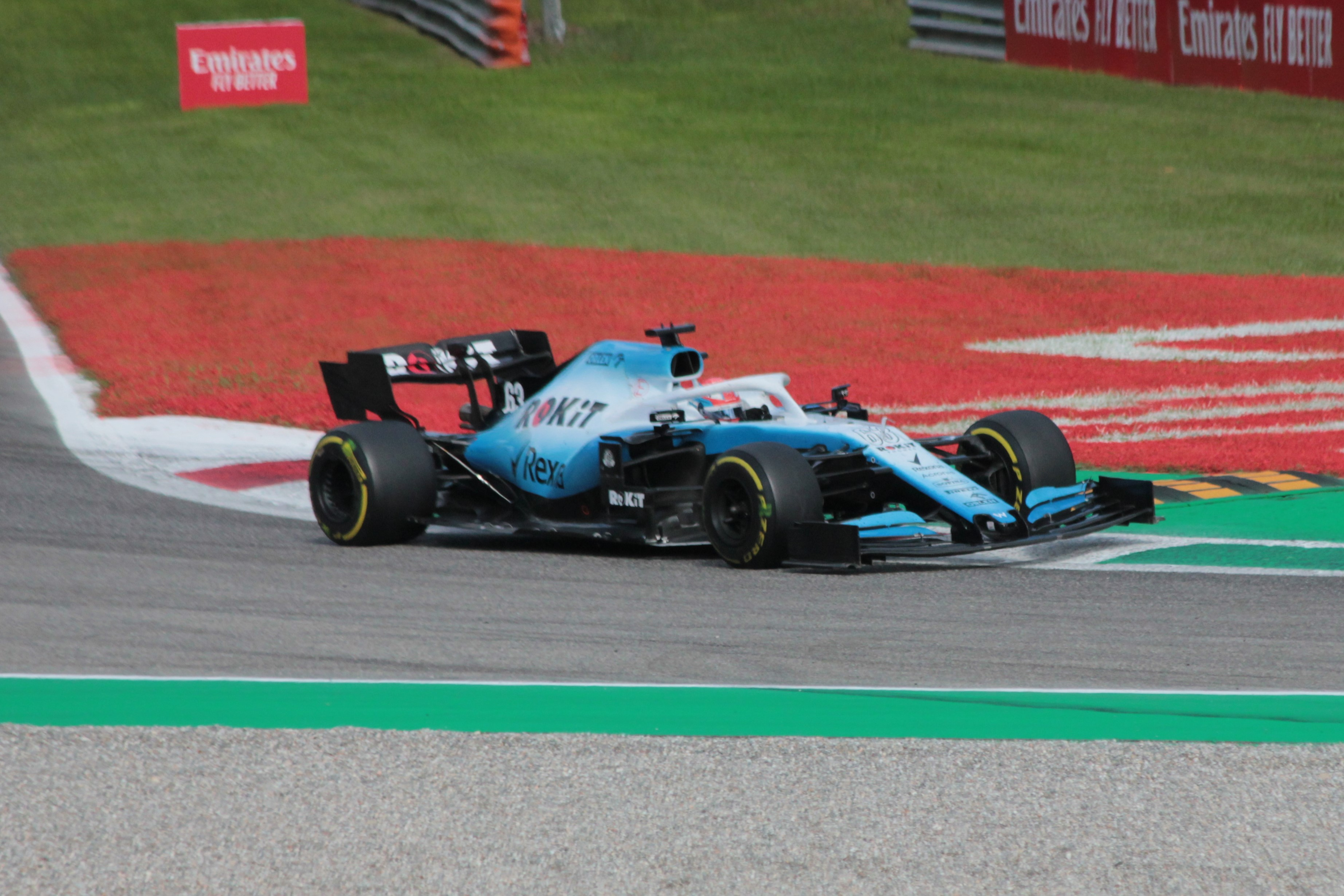
Russell during the Italian Grand Prix

A similar situation saw both cars start in the top 15 for the first time in Italy because of the same reason. Their classified finish streak took a tumble when George Russell retired from a collision on lap 34 at the Singapore Grand Prix. Due to Russell crashing into the barriers following brake issues, and Williams deciding to retire Kubica in order to conserve parts, the following round in Russia saw their first double retirement since the 2018 German Grand Prix. During qualifying at Suzuka, Kubica crashed his car after hitting the outside wall at the exit of turn 18, after running wide onto the grass destroying the car's front wing and left-hand wheels, causing significant damage to the survival cell, thus forcing the Williams mechanics to change the Pole's chassis and gearbox, forcing him to start in the pitlane.

== Livery ==
The FW42 featured a white base paint and unique flourish blue livery. After losing the main sponsorship from Martini, the team switched into ROKiT as a title sponsor. This was the final year for the deodorant brand Rexona after five years of partnership.

== Complete Formula One results ==
(key)

Year	Entrant	Engine	Tyres	Drivers	Grands Prix																					Points	WCC
Year	Entrant	Engine	Tyres	Drivers	AUS	BHR	CHN	AZE	ESP	MON	CAN	FRA	AUT	GBR	GER	HUN	BEL	ITA	SIN	RUS	JPN	MEX	USA	BRA	ABU	Points	WCC
2019	ROKiT Williams Racing	Mercedes-AMG F1 M10 EQ Power+	P	Robert Kubica	17	16	17	16	18	18	18	18	20	15	10	19	17	17	16	Ret	17	18	Ret	16	19	1	10th
2019	ROKiT Williams Racing	Mercedes-AMG F1 M10 EQ Power+	P	George Russell	16	15	16	15	17	15	16	19	18	14	11	16	15	14	Ret	Ret	16	16	17	12	17	1	10th
