= François-Xavier Demaison =

François-Xavier Demaison may refer to:

- François-Xavier Demaison (actor)
- François-Xavier Demaison (engineer)
