= 2021 Monaco Grand Prix =

5th round of the 2021 Formula One World Championship

Race 5 of 22 (Note: At the time of the event Formula One planned to hold twenty-three Grands Prix.) in the 2021 Formula One World Championship
← Previous race	Next race →
- Layout of the Circuit de Monte Carlo, Monaco

Race details
- Date: 23 May 2021
- Official name: Formula 1 Grand Prix de Monaco 2021
- Location: Circuit de Monaco; La Condamine and Monte Carlo, Monaco
- Course: Street circuit
- Course length: 3.337 km (2.074 miles)
- Distance: 78 laps, 260.286 km (161.734 miles)
- Weather: Sunny

Pole position
Driver	(Monaco) Charles Leclerc (Note: Charles Leclerc set the fastest qualifying time, but did not start the race due to residual damage from a crash during qualifying. Pole position was left vacant on the grid. Max Verstappen, in the second slot, was the first driver on the grid. Leclerc is still considered to have held pole position.)	Ferrari
- Time: 1:10.346

Fastest lap
Driver	(United Kingdom) Lewis Hamilton	Mercedes
- Time: 1:12.909 on lap 69 (lap record)

Podium
First	(Netherlands) Max Verstappen	Red Bull Racing-Honda
Second	(Spain) Carlos Sainz Jr.	Ferrari
Third	(United Kingdom) Lando Norris	McLaren-Mercedes

The 2021 Monaco Grand Prix (officially known as the Formula 1 Grand Prix de Monaco 2021) was a Formula One motor race held on 23 May 2021 at the Circuit de Monaco, a street circuit that runs through the Principality of Monaco. It was the fifth round of the 2021 Formula One World Championship, the 78th time that the Monaco Grand Prix was held, and the first time it had been held since 2019 after the 2020 round was cancelled due to the COVID-19 pandemic. The 78-lap race was won by Max Verstappen (Red Bull Racing) after polesitter Charles Leclerc of (Ferrari), who crashed in qualifying, failed to start the race with a driveshaft problem. The podium was rounded off by Leclerc's teammate Carlos Sainz Jr. and Lando Norris (McLaren). Lewis Hamilton, who was leading the Drivers' Championship for Mercedes, finished seventh, allowing his title rival Verstappen to take the lead of the championship for the first time in his career.

== Background ==
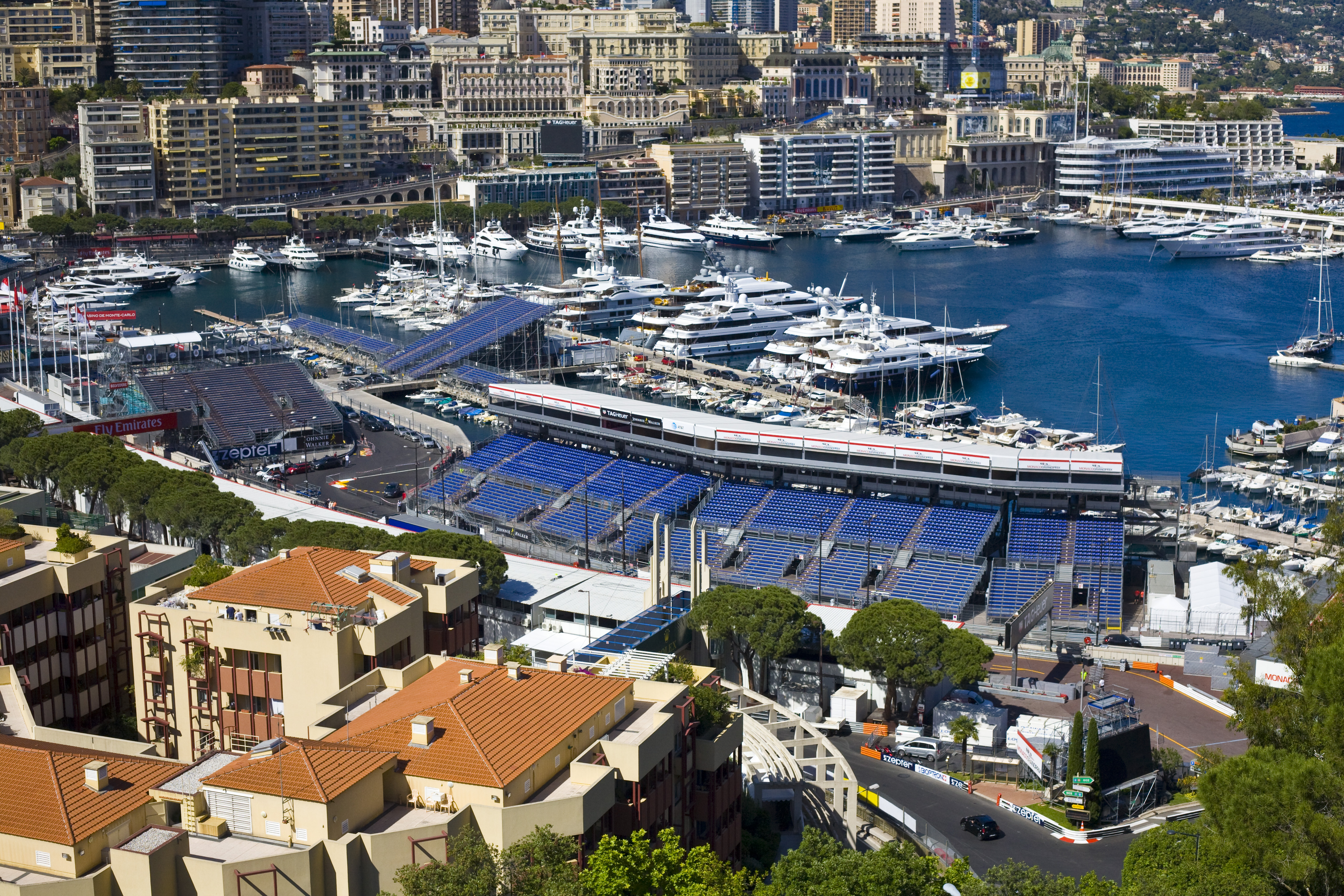
A photo of the Circuit de Monaco in 2016.

This race marked the 750th race start for the Williams team, and to celebrate the occasion, Williams placed the names of 100 Williams supporters on the halo of their car, the FW43B. McLaren also ran a special one-off Gulf Racing–inspired livery for the event, to celebrate their collaboration started in the 1960s.

=== Entrants ===
The drivers and teams were the same as the season entry list with no additional stand-in drivers for the race.

=== Tyre choices ===
Tyre supplier Pirelli brought the C3, C4 and C5 tyre compounds (designated hard, medium and soft respectively) for teams to use at the event.

== Qualifying ==
Qualifying was held on 22 May 2021, at 16:00 (UTC+2).

=== Qualifying report ===
Charles Leclerc qualified on pole despite crashing in the final minutes of Q3, whilst Max Verstappen joined him on the front row having qualified second, Valtteri Bottas shared the second row with Carlos Sainz having qualified third and fourth respectively. Lando Norris had his best qualifying result of the season and qualified fifth. Championship leader Lewis Hamilton had his worst qualifying since the 2018 German Grand Prix, and qualified outside the top two for the first time in 2021, qualifying seventh. Mick Schumacher was not able to participate in qualifying due to a heavy crash in the final practice session.

=== Qualifying classification ===
Pos.	No.	Driver	Constructor	Qualifying times			Final grid
Pos.	No.	Driver	Constructor	Q1	Q2	Q3	Final grid
1	16	(Monaco) Charles Leclerc	Ferrari	1:11.113	1:10.597	1:10.346	1
2	33	(Netherlands) Max Verstappen	Red Bull Racing-Honda	1:11.124	1:10.650	1:10.576	2
3	77	(Finland) Valtteri Bottas	Mercedes	1:10.938	1:10.695	1:10.601	3
4	55	(Spain) Carlos Sainz Jr.	Ferrari	1:11.324	1:10.806	1:10.611	4
5	4	(United Kingdom) Lando Norris	McLaren-Mercedes	1:11.321	1:11.031	1:10.620	5
6	10	(France) Pierre Gasly	AlphaTauri-Honda	1:11.560	1:11.179	1:10.900	6
7	44	(United Kingdom) Lewis Hamilton	Mercedes	1:11.622	1:11.116	1:11.095	7
8	5	(Germany) Sebastian Vettel	Aston Martin-Mercedes	1:12.078	1:11.309	1:11.419	8
9	11	(Mexico) Sergio Pérez	Red Bull Racing-Honda	1:11.644	1:11.019	1:11.573	9
10	99	(Italy) Antonio Giovinazzi	Alfa Romeo Racing-Ferrari	1:11.658	1:11.409	1:11.779	10
11	31	(France) Esteban Ocon	Alpine-Renault	1:11.740	1:11.486	N/A	11
12	3	(Australia) Daniel Ricciardo	McLaren-Mercedes	1:11.747	1:11.598	N/A	12
13	18	(Canada) Lance Stroll	Aston Martin-Mercedes	1:11.979	1:11.600	N/A	13
14	7	(Finland) Kimi Räikkönen	Alfa Romeo Racing-Ferrari	1:11.899	1:11.642	N/A	14
15	63	(United Kingdom) George Russell	Williams-Mercedes	1:12.016	1:11.830	N/A	15
16	22	(Japan) Yuki Tsunoda	AlphaTauri-Honda	1:12.096	N/A	N/A	16
17	14	(Spain) Fernando Alonso	Alpine-Renault	1:12.205	N/A	N/A	17
18	6	(Canada) Nicholas Latifi	Williams-Mercedes	1:12.366	N/A	N/A	18
19	9	(Russian Automobile Federation) Nikita Mazepin (Note: Nikita Mazepin is Russian, but he competed as a neutral competitor using the designation RAF (Russian Automobile Federation), as the Court of Arbitration for Sport upheld a ban on Russia competing at World Championships. The ban was implemented by the World Anti-Doping Agency in response to the state-sponsored doping program of Russian athletes.)	Haas-Ferrari	1:12.958	N/A	N/A	19
107% time: 1:15.903
—	47	(Germany) Mick Schumacher	Haas-Ferrari	No time	N/A	N/A	20^{1}

Notes

- ^1 – Mick Schumacher did not take part in qualifying due to an accident that occurred during the third practice session. He was permitted to race at the stewards' discretion. He also received a five-place grid penalty for an unscheduled gearbox change. The penalty was nullified as he would start from last place regardless.

== Race ==
=== Race report ===
Ferrari inspected Charles Leclerc's car overnight after his crash in qualifying. The primary concern was Leclerc's gearbox, but it was cleared, and it was expected that Leclerc would start on pole. On race day, Leclerc brought the car out from the pits on the reconnaissance lap out to the grid, and a failure in the left driveshaft was detected. There was not enough time to repair the problem before the race, and thus Leclerc did not start in the race. Ferrari later discovered the issue was caused by a cracked left-rear driveshaft hub.

Due to Leclerc's failure to start the race, pole position on the grid was left empty, leaving Max Verstappen as the de facto polesitter, though he lined up in the second grid position. At the start of the race Valtteri Bottas got away slightly better than Verstappen, but the latter was able to cover off the former to take the lead into the first corner. Bottas later retired at his scheduled pitstop on lap 30, when his team was unable to remove his right front wheel due to a stripped wheel nut, promoting Carlos Sainz to second place and Lando Norris to third.

Verstappen pitted for fresh tyres on lap 34. Sergio Pérez led most of lap 35 before being called into the pits at the end of the same lap, and this meant that Verstappen officially led all laps through the pit stops. Pérez used pit strategy to improve to fourth, which is where he finished the race. The podium was formed by the same drivers in those positions at the halfway point of the race: Verstappen in the lead, Sainz in second, and Norris in third. Pérez, in fourth, closed in on Norris but was unable to pass him before the race ended. Sebastian Vettel and Antonio Giovinazzi scored their first points of the season, finishing fifth for Aston Martin and 10th for Alfa Romeo, respectively. This was also Alfa Romeo's first point of the season. Lewis Hamilton, in seventh, used a late race tyre change to challenge for the race's fastest lap, earning one extra championship point.

Three former Monaco Grand Prix winners, Kimi Räikkönen, Daniel Ricciardo, and Fernando Alonso, all finished one lap down on race winner Verstappen and out of the points in 11th, 12th and 13th places respectively. Verstappen's and Pérez's high points haul, along with Bottas' retirement and Hamilton's seventh-place finish, was sufficient to propel Red Bull into the lead in the Constructors' Championship, and Verstappen into the lead in the Drivers' Championship. This was the first time since the 2018 British Grand Prix that Mercedes had not led either championship. It was also the first time Verstappen was the points leader in his Formula One career. The FIA said it was open to suggesting layout changes for the future to the improve the on track excitement at the venue, after the race provided just one on-track overtake. (Note: Sources disagree about whether first lap overtakes should be considered to the total, with some sources reporting zero overtakes, and others one.)

=== Post-race ===
Mercedes team boss, Toto Wolff admitted they had suffered a disastrous weekend. McLaren admitted it had not expected to be competitive enough for a podium result. In the aftermath of Leclerc's qualifying crash, FIA race director Michael Masi stated the FIA was looking into the possibility of introducing a rule where drivers who cause red flags in qualifying have their lap times deleted, to avoid the possibility of drivers crashing intentionally to prevent other drivers improving, though Masi said he was convinced Leclerc's qualifying crash was a genuine driver error. Télé Monte Carlo's broadcast direction was criticized after cutting away from Vettel's duel with Pierre Gasly on lap 32 to a replay of Lance Stroll hitting a kerb on the exit of the Piscine Pool. The video became an internet meme.

=== Race classification ===
Pos.	No.	Driver	Constructor	Laps	Time/Retired	Grid	Points
1	33	(Netherlands) Max Verstappen	Red Bull Racing-Honda	78	1:38:56.820	2	25
2	55	(Spain) Carlos Sainz Jr.	Ferrari	78	+8.968	4	18
3	4	(United Kingdom) Lando Norris	McLaren-Mercedes	78	+19.427	5	15
4	11	(Mexico) Sergio Pérez	Red Bull Racing-Honda	78	+20.490	9	12
5	5	(Germany) Sebastian Vettel	Aston Martin-Mercedes	78	+52.591	8	10
6	10	(France) Pierre Gasly	AlphaTauri-Honda	78	+53.896	6	8
7	44	(United Kingdom) Lewis Hamilton	Mercedes	78	+1:08.231	7	7^{1}
8	18	(Canada) Lance Stroll	Aston Martin-Mercedes	77	+1 lap	13	4
9	31	(France) Esteban Ocon	Alpine-Renault	77	+1 lap	11	2
10	99	(Italy) Antonio Giovinazzi	Alfa Romeo Racing-Ferrari	77	+1 lap	10	1
11	7	(Finland) Kimi Räikkönen	Alfa Romeo Racing-Ferrari	77	+1 lap	14	
12	3	(Australia) Daniel Ricciardo	McLaren-Mercedes	77	+1 lap	12	
13	14	(Spain) Fernando Alonso	Alpine-Renault	77	+1 lap	17	
14	63	(United Kingdom) George Russell	Williams-Mercedes	77	+1 lap	15	
15	6	(Canada) Nicholas Latifi	Williams-Mercedes	77	+1 lap	18	
16	22	(Japan) Yuki Tsunoda	AlphaTauri-Honda	77	+1 lap	16	
17	9	(Russian Automobile Federation) Nikita Mazepin	Haas-Ferrari	75	+3 laps	19	
18	47	(Germany) Mick Schumacher	Haas-Ferrari	75	+3 laps	20	
Ret	77	(Finland) Valtteri Bottas	Mercedes	29	Wheel nut	3	
DNS	16	(Monaco) Charles Leclerc	Ferrari	0	Driveshaft hub	—^{2}	
Fastest lap: (United Kingdom) Lewis Hamilton (Mercedes) – 1:12.909 (lap 69)

Notes

- ^1 – Includes one point for fastest lap.
- ^2 – Charles Leclerc did not start the race due to residual damage from a crash during qualifying. His place on the grid was left vacant.

== Championship standings after the race ==
Drivers' Championship standings

	Pos.	Driver	Points
1	1	(Netherlands) Max Verstappen	105
1	2	(United Kingdom) Lewis Hamilton	101
1	3	(United Kingdom) Lando Norris	56
1	4	(Finland) Valtteri Bottas	47
1	5	(Mexico) Sergio Pérez	44

Constructors' Championship standings

	Pos.	Constructor	Points
1	1	(Austria) Red Bull Racing-Honda	149
1	2	(Germany) Mercedes	148
	3	(United Kingdom) McLaren-Mercedes	80
	4	(Italy) Ferrari	78
2	5	(United Kingdom) Aston Martin-Mercedes	19

- Note: Only the top five positions are included for both sets of standings.

== See also ==
- 2021 Monte Carlo Formula 2 round

== Notes ==
Previous race: 2021 Spanish Grand Prix	FIA Formula One World Championship; 2021 season	Next race: 2021 Azerbaijan Grand Prix
Previous race: 2019 Monaco Grand Prix	Monaco Grand Prix	Next race: 2022 Monaco Grand Prix
