= 2021 Azerbaijan Grand Prix =

6th round of the 2021 Formula One season

Race 6 of 22 (Note: At the time of the event Formula One planned to hold twenty-three Grands Prix. At the time of the race this was subject to the replacement of the cancelled Singapore Grand Prix. The gap in the calendar was later filled by the previously-postponed Turkish Grand Prix.) in the 2021 Formula One World Championship
← Previous race	Next race →
- Layout of the Baku City Circuit

Race details
- Date: 6 June 2021
- Official name: Formula 1 Azerbaijan Grand Prix 2021
- Location: Baku City Circuit; Baku, Azerbaijan
- Course: Street circuit
- Course length: 6.003 km (3.730 miles)
- Distance: 51 laps, 306.049 km (190.170 miles)
- Weather: Sunny
- Attendance: 0 (Note: The Grand Prix was held behind closed doors due to the COVID-19 pandemic in Azerbaijan.)

Pole position
Driver	(Monaco) Charles Leclerc	Ferrari
- Time: 1:41.218

Fastest lap
Driver	(Netherlands) Max Verstappen	Red Bull Racing-Honda
- Time: 1:44.481 on lap 44

Podium
First	(Mexico) Sergio Pérez	Red Bull Racing-Honda
Second	(Germany) Sebastian Vettel	Aston Martin-Mercedes
Third	(France) Pierre Gasly	AlphaTauri-Honda

The 2021 Azerbaijan Grand Prix (officially known as the Formula 1 Azerbaijan Grand Prix 2021) was a Formula One motor race held on 6 June 2021 at the Baku City Circuit in Baku, Azerbaijan. The race, the sixth round of the 2021 Formula One World Championship, marked the fourth running of the Azerbaijan Grand Prix, and the fifth time the country had hosted a Grand Prix, having also held the 2016 European Grand Prix.

Both championship contenders, Lewis Hamilton and Max Verstappen, experienced problems during the 51-lap race; Verstappen retired due to a high-speed tyre blowout, while Hamilton made a severe error at the resultant restart. Their troubles cleared the way for Sergio Pérez, Verstappen's teammate, to win his second Grand Prix, following his victory at the 2020 Sakhir Grand Prix. Sebastian Vettel took second place for his only podium with Aston Martin, and the final podium finish of his career, while Pierre Gasly claimed third place for AlphaTauri, and the final podium finish of Scuderia AlphaTauri to date before being rebranded to Visa Cash App RB. After the race, tyre supplier Pirelli launched an investigation into the tyre failures which ended the races of Verstappen and Lance Stroll.

This was Vettel's final podium in his Formula One career, and the last for a German driver until the 2025 British Grand Prix.

== Background ==
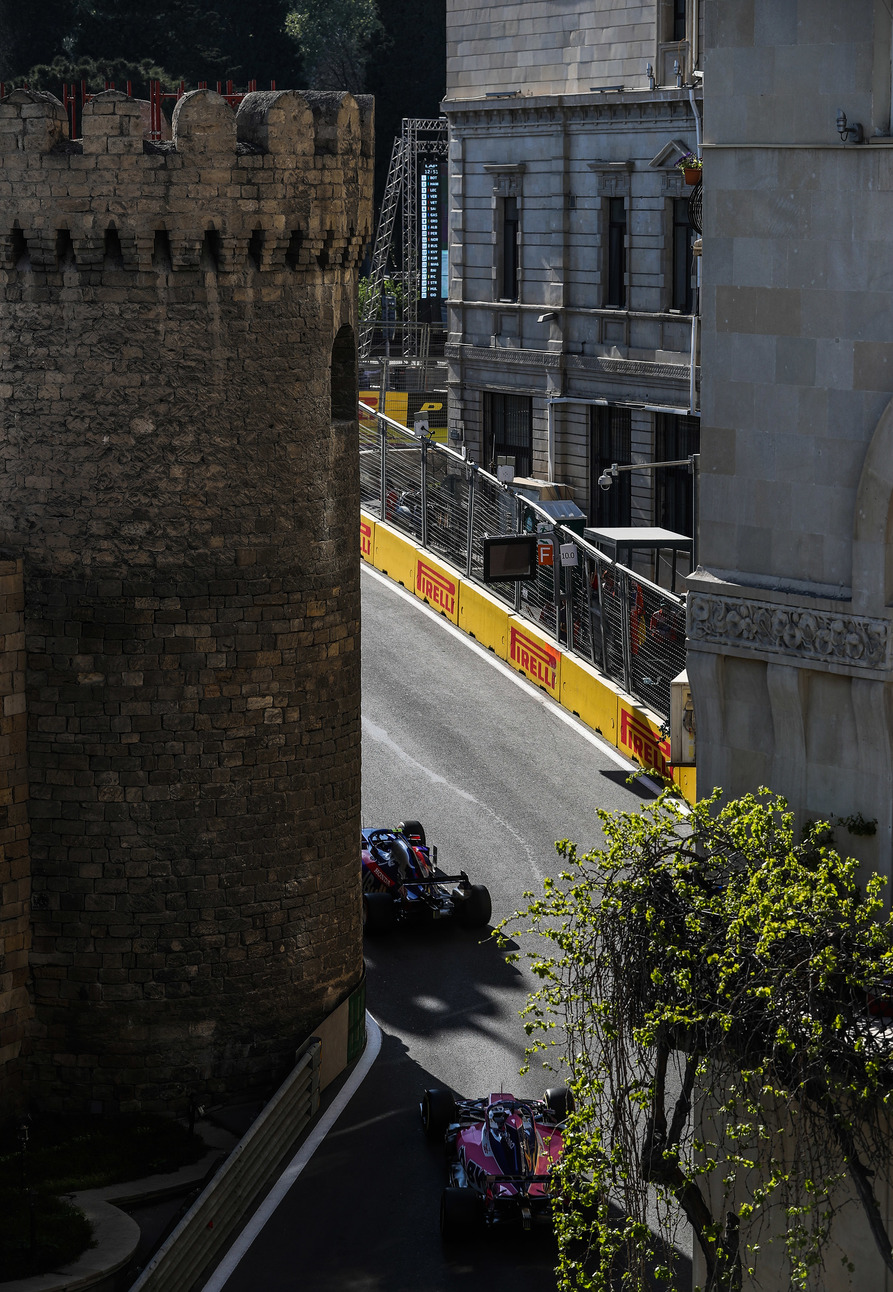
The course (photographed in 2019) passes through Old Baku.

The drivers and teams were the same as the season entry list with no additional stand-in drivers for the race. Tyre supplier Pirelli brought the C3, C4, and C5 tyre compounds (designated hard, medium, and soft, respectively) for teams to use at the event.

The race was held at the 6.003 kilometres (3.730 mi) Baku City Circuit in Baku, Azerbaijan, and was contested over 51 laps. Mercedes and Red Bull were considered favourites to win the race.

Having won the previous race at Monaco, Max Verstappen, of Red Bull, entered the round holding a four-point lead in the World Driver's Championship ahead of rival Lewis Hamilton, who was driving for Mercedes. Red Bull also held a one-point lead over Mercedes in the World Constructors' Championship.

== Practice ==
The first practice session started at 12:30 local time (UTC+4) on 4 June, with second practice session starting at 16:00 on the same day, with a third practice session due to start at 13:00 local time on 5 June, with a three sessions lasting one hour. The first session ended with the Red Bull Racing of Max Verstappen fastest ahead of the Ferrari duo of Charles Leclerc and Carlos Sainz Jr. Mercedes had a low key session with Lewis Hamilton and Valtteri Bottas in seventh fastest and tenth fastest respectively. Sergio Pérez was fastest in the second session ahead of Red Bull teammate Verstappen and Sainz. Leclerc finished 4th having caused a yellow flag after hitting the barrier at turn 15. Nicholas Latifi caused a red flag after his Williams car's engine failed. The Mercedes pair Hamilton and Bottas once again struggled finishing 11th and 15th fastest respectively.

== Qualifying ==
=== Report ===
Qualifying started at 16:00 local time on 5 June. Lance Stroll and Antonio Giovinazzi (both in Q1), Daniel Ricciardo (Q2), Yuki Tsunoda, and Carlos Sainz Jr. (both Q3) all had accidents resulting in four red flags over the course of qualifying, tying it with the 2016 Hungarian Grand Prix as a record for the most red flags in a qualifying session. George Russell changed his drivetrain before heading out for a flying lap, the Q1 red flags giving his pit crew extra time in the garage to make for a flying lap. Charles Leclerc took pole position for the second consecutive event from Lewis Hamilton and Max Verstappen.

After qualifying, Lando Norris said he was left "gutted" after he was handed a three-place grid penalty as well as three-penalty points on his FIA Super Licence for failing to correctly follow the red flag procedures. Leclerc was surprised to be on pole and said he thought his pole lap was "quite shit". Hamilton hailed his second place on the grid a "monumental effort", while championship leader Max Verstappen was frustrated with third on the grid after what he described as "a stupid qualifying". Fernando Alonso, who qualified ninth, gave outspoken criticism of the fact that drivers who cause red flags are not punished, deeming it "unfair" that drivers who cause red flags are allowed to keep their grid positions. Valtteri Bottas was mystified with his qualifying performance after finishing down in tenth, eight positions behind teammate Hamilton, saying "something is wrong" with his car.

=== Qualifying classification ===
Pos.	No.	Driver	Constructor	Qualifying times			Final grid
Pos.	No.	Driver	Constructor	Q1	Q2	Q3	Final grid
1	16	(Monaco) Charles Leclerc	Ferrari	1:42.241	1:41.659	1:41.218	1
2	44	(United Kingdom) Lewis Hamilton	Mercedes	1:41.545	1:41.634	1:41.450	2
3	33	(Netherlands) Max Verstappen	Red Bull Racing-Honda	1:41.760	1:41.625	1:41.563	3
4	10	(France) Pierre Gasly	AlphaTauri-Honda	1:42.288	1:41.932	1:41.565	4
5	55	(Spain) Carlos Sainz Jr.	Ferrari	1:42.121	1:41.740	1:41.576	5
6	4	(United Kingdom) Lando Norris	McLaren-Mercedes	1:42.167	1:41.813	1:41.747	9^{a}
7	11	(Mexico) Sergio Pérez	Red Bull Racing-Honda	1:41.968	1:41.630	1:41.917	6
8	22	(Japan) Yuki Tsunoda	AlphaTauri-Honda	1:42.521	1:41.654	1:42.211	7
9	14	(Spain) Fernando Alonso	Alpine-Renault	1:42.934	1:42.195	1:42.327	8
10	77	(Finland) Valtteri Bottas	Mercedes	1:42.701	1:42.106	1:42.659	10
11	5	(Germany) Sebastian Vettel	Aston Martin-Mercedes	1:42.460	1:42.224	N/A	11
12	31	(France) Esteban Ocon	Alpine-Renault	1:42.426	1:42.273	N/A	12
13	3	(Australia) Daniel Ricciardo	McLaren-Mercedes	1:42.304	1:42.558	N/A	13
14	7	(Finland) Kimi Räikkönen	Alfa Romeo Racing-Ferrari	1:42.923	1:42.587	N/A	14
15	63	(United Kingdom) George Russell	Williams-Mercedes	1:42.728	1:42.758	N/A	15
16	6	(Canada) Nicholas Latifi	Williams-Mercedes	1:43.128	N/A	N/A	16
17	47	(Germany) Mick Schumacher	Haas-Ferrari	1:44.158	N/A	N/A	17
18	9	(Russian Automobile Federation) Nikita Mazepin (Note: Nikita Mazepin is Russian, but he competed as a neutral competitor using the designation RAF (Russian Automobile Federation), as the Court of Arbitration for Sport upheld a ban on Russia competing at World Championships. The ban was implemented by the World Anti-Doping Agency in response to the state-sponsored doping program of Russian athletes.)	Haas-Ferrari	1:44.238	N/A	N/A	18
107% time: 1:48.653
—	18	(Canada) Lance Stroll	Aston Martin-Mercedes	No time	N/A	N/A	19^{b}
—	99	(Italy) Antonio Giovinazzi	Alfa Romeo Racing-Ferrari	No time	N/A	N/A	20^{b}

Notes

- ^a – Lando Norris received a three-place grid penalty for failing to comply with red flags in Q1.
- ^b – Lance Stroll and Antonio Giovinazzi both failed to set a time during qualifying and were permitted to race at the stewards' discretion.

== Race ==
=== Report ===
Before the start of the race, a moment of silence was held in memories of the deceased former FIA chief Max Mosley and long-time McLaren shareholder Mansour Ojjeh. The race started at 16:00 local time on 6 June and was contested over 51 laps. The start did not produce many overtakes, as Leclerc retained first place ahead of Hamilton and Verstappen. The main change in the order was Sergio Pérez overtaking Carlos Sainz Jr. and Pierre Gasly to move from sixth to fourth place. Behind them, Fernando Alonso climbed to seventh place and Sebastian Vettel to ninth, having started eighth and eleventh, respectively. At the end of lap 3, Hamilton passed Leclerc on the start–finish straight to take the lead, making the top ten order Hamilton, Leclerc, Verstappen, Pérez, Gasly, Sainz, Alonso, Yuki Tsunoda, Vettel, and Valtteri Bottas. Esteban Ocon retired at the end of the lap 3 with a turbocharger failure. Three laps later, Verstappen passed Leclerc for second place. Pérez also overtook Leclerc on the following lap, dropping Leclerc to fourth place.

On lap 8, Alonso became the first driver to make a pit stop for fresh tyres, and Leclerc followed suit one lap later. On lap 11, Sainz outbraked himself into the turn 8 chicane, dropping him from 6th to 15th and finding himself having to reverse out of a very narrow run off onto the racing line. Hamilton was the first driver from the top three to make a pit stop. In an otherwise tidy stop, his exit from the pit box was delayed due to Gasly driving the pit lane behind him, costing him about two seconds. The following lap, Verstappen made his stop, giving Pérez a temporary lead. Pérez then stopped the lap after, but the wheelgun of the rear-right mechanic failed; the spare was used and the stop was completed. Following the stops, both Red Bulls jumped Hamilton, dropping him to fourth place, with Vettel, yet to make a pit stop, temporarily in the lead. Vettel stayed out for another four laps, maintaining speed before finally coming to the pit lane and exiting the pits in seventh place, over-cutting Tsunoda with his new tyres, seven laps fresher than the tyres of Gasly, Hamilton, and all the runners in front of him.

The order settled over the next fifteen laps with Hamilton unsuccessfully trying to pass Pérez for second place. On lap 30, Aston Martin's Lance Stroll, who was the sole driver to have started the race on the hardest tyre compound and not to have made a pit stop yet, suffered a left-rear tyre failure when exiting turn 20 onto the main straight, causing him to lose control and crash into the left-hand barriers, resulting in his retirement and the safety car being deployed for a few laps. Stroll's stricken car had ended up on the pit lane entry and the pit lane was closed until it had been cleared. When the pit lane opened, the field had been brought together behind the safety car and none of the front runners elected to make a pit stop. The only ones who took a fresh set of tyres during the safety car period were Fernando Alonso, Antonio Giovinazzi, George Russell, and Nikita Mazepin. The safety car period ended after four laps and normal racing resumed on the start of lap 36. The top three remained unchanged, with Vettel passing Leclerc on the resumption of racing for fifth place. At the end of the lap, Vettel passed Gasly to climb into fourth place. The top five order settled for the next eight laps, with Hamilton unable to keep up with Pérez through the corners, whilst closing the gap again down the straights.

Verstappen then set the race's fastest lap of 1:44.805 on lap 44. Two laps later, his Red Bull RB16B suffered a left-rear tyre failure on the main straight causing him to spin and crash into the barriers, coming to rest about 50m short of the finishing line. He retired from the race as a result and the safety car was deployed for a second time; this meant that Pérez was in the lead with Hamilton in second. The race director Michael Masi ordered the cars to pass through the pit lane to bypass the accident scene. Williams' Nicholas Latifi was told to "stay out" by his engineer, which he interpreted as an instruction not to enter the pit lane; in fact, the cars were required to drive through the pit lane, and "stay out" had merely been an instruction not to stop for tyres while doing so. This failure to follow the race director's instructions cost him a post-race penalty of 30 seconds being added to his race time, which was converted from a 10-second stop-and-go penalty. A number of messages were exchanged between Masi and the teams during the red flag period; McLaren's Paul James complained that Tsunoda did not slow down sufficiently for the initial double-yellows, to which Masi replied that none of the drivers had sufficiently slowed and that all of them would be addressed post-race. Red Bull Racing's Jonathan Wheatley advised Masi that Verstappen's tyre had exploded with no warning and suggested that the race be red-flagged to allow all the drivers to change to fresh tyres to mitigate against another failure. On the formation lap to the grid for the restart, George Russell's Williams ground to a halt in the pit lane and retired with gearbox issues.

After a delay of 34 minutes, the race was restarted on lap 50 with a standing start, using the race order at the moment of the suspension of the race. Pérez had a slow start from the lead and Hamilton tried to pass on the inside of turn 1 but had inadvertently selected the wrong brake mode and was unable to brake sufficiently, causing him to lock up at high speed and forcing him onto the escape road; Hamilton dropped to last, a result that would have significant consequences for him at the end of the season. A scrap ensued between Gasly and Leclerc, with the former prevailing having exchanged positions twice down the main straight on the penultimate lap. Pérez then led the race to the end, ahead of Vettel and Gasly, with Leclerc, Norris, Alonso, Tsunoda, Sainz, Daniel Ricciardo, and Kimi Räikkönen completing the top ten. Mick Schumacher had been passed by his teammate Mazepin at the restart but regained his position just before crossing the finish line to end the race.

Pérez won his second Formula One race, his first win for Red Bull, and the first Red Bull race win by a driver other than Verstappen since the 2018 Monaco Grand Prix, which was won by Ricciardo. Vettel's podium was his only one for Aston Martin (following disqualification from second place at the Hungarian Grand Prix five rounds later), while Räikkönen took his first point of the season in tenth place. Both Mercedes drivers failed to score points despite finishing the race for the first time since the 2012 United States Grand Prix. In Hamilton's worst finish for over twelve years, it also marked the first time since the 2013 Spanish Grand Prix that he finished a race outside the points.

=== Post-race ===
With the tyre failures on the rear for both Stroll and Verstappen, Pirelli lodged an investigation over the durability of the selected tyre compounds, their initial findings suggesting the tyre problems were linked to debris. Masi was expected to reiterate the importance of yellow flag conditions to drivers prior to the 2021 French Grand Prix after the complaints lodged by McLaren during the race. Drivers, including Leclerc, said they would query the decision to delay the deployment of the safety car following Verstappen's crash late in the race. Masi defended his decision to restart the race with two laps remaining from a standing start, saying there was no reason not to resume racing. When asked why Verstappen's accident warranted a red flag but Stroll's similar accident only warranted a safety car, Masi stated that he wished to resume racing after Verstappen's accident had been cleared, but there were insufficient laps remaining and insufficient time to clear Verstappen's accident under safety car conditions.

=== Race classification ===
Pos.	No.	Driver	Constructor	Laps	Time/Retired	Grid	Points
1	11	(Mexico) Sergio Pérez	Red Bull Racing-Honda	51	2:13:36.410	6	25
2	5	(Germany) Sebastian Vettel	Aston Martin-Mercedes	51	+1.385	11	18
3	10	(France) Pierre Gasly	AlphaTauri-Honda	51	+2.762	4	15
4	16	(Monaco) Charles Leclerc	Ferrari	51	+3.828	1	12
5	4	(United Kingdom) Lando Norris	McLaren-Mercedes	51	+4.754	9	10
6	14	(Spain) Fernando Alonso	Alpine-Renault	51	+6.382	8	8
7	22	(Japan) Yuki Tsunoda	AlphaTauri-Honda	51	+6.624	7	6
8	55	(Spain) Carlos Sainz Jr.	Ferrari	51	+7.709	5	4
9	3	(Australia) Daniel Ricciardo	McLaren-Mercedes	51	+8.874	13	2
10	7	(Finland) Kimi Räikkönen	Alfa Romeo Racing-Ferrari	51	+9.576	14	1
11	99	(Italy) Antonio Giovinazzi	Alfa Romeo Racing-Ferrari	51	+10.254	20	
12	77	(Finland) Valtteri Bottas	Mercedes	51	+11.264	10	
13	47	(Germany) Mick Schumacher	Haas-Ferrari	51	+14.241	17	
14	9	(Russian Automobile Federation) Nikita Mazepin	Haas-Ferrari	51	+14.315	18	
15	44	(United Kingdom) Lewis Hamilton	Mercedes	51	+17.668	2	
16	6	(Canada) Nicholas Latifi	Williams-Mercedes	51	+42.379^{1}	16	
17^{2}	63	(United Kingdom) George Russell	Williams-Mercedes	48	Gearbox	15	
18^{2}	33	(Netherlands) Max Verstappen	Red Bull Racing-Honda	45	Tyre failure/Accident	3	
Ret	18	(Canada) Lance Stroll	Aston Martin-Mercedes	29	Tyre failure/Accident	19	
Ret	31	(France) Esteban Ocon	Alpine-Renault	3	Turbocharger	12	
Fastest lap: (Netherlands) Max Verstappen (Red Bull Racing-Honda) – 1:44.481 (lap 44)

Notes

- ^1 – Nicholas Latifi finished thirteenth on the track but received a 10-second stop-and-go penalty converted to a 30-second time penalty for failing to enter the pit lane as instructed during the safety car period.
- ^2 – George Russell and Max Verstappen were classified as they completed more than 90% of the race distance.

== Championship standings after the race ==
Drivers' Championship standings

	Pos.	Driver	Points
	1	(Netherlands) Max Verstappen	105
	2	(United Kingdom) Lewis Hamilton	101
2	3	(Mexico) Sergio Pérez	69
1	4	(United Kingdom) Lando Norris	66
1	5	(Monaco) Charles Leclerc	52

Constructors' Championship standings

	Pos.	Constructor	Points
	1	(Austria) Red Bull Racing-Honda	174
	2	(Germany) Mercedes	148
1	3	(Italy) Ferrari	94
1	4	(United Kingdom) McLaren-Mercedes	92
1	5	(Italy) AlphaTauri-Honda	39

- Note: Only the top five positions are included for both sets of standings.

== See also ==
- 2021 Baku Formula 2 round
- List of red-flagged Formula One races

== Notes ==
Previous race: 2021 Monaco Grand Prix	FIA Formula One World Championship; 2021 season	Next race: 2021 French Grand Prix
Previous race: 2019 Azerbaijan Grand Prix	Azerbaijan Grand Prix	Next race: 2022 Azerbaijan Grand Prix
