= Jost Capito =

German Motorsport manager

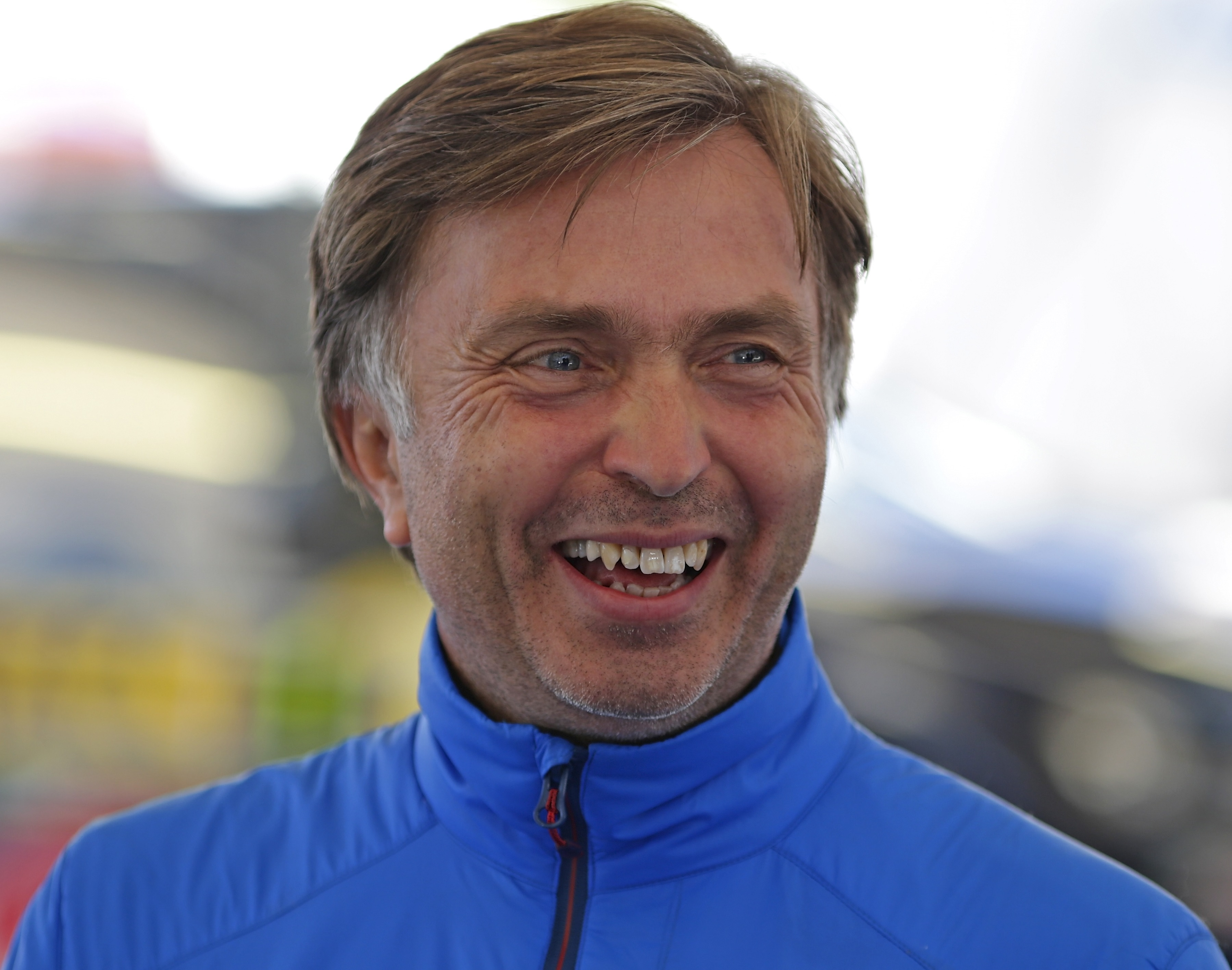
- Capito during WRC Rally Catalunya 2015
- Born: 29 September 1958 (age 67); Neunkirchen, West Germany
- Education: Technical University of Munich
- Employer(s): BMW Motorsport 1985–89; Porsche 1989–96; Sauber 1996; Ford Performance 1997–2007; Volkswagen Motorsport (2012–16); McLaren (2016); Williams Racing (2020–2022)
- Known for: Volkswagen Motorsport (Director of Motorsport); McLaren (CEO); Williams Racing (Team Principal)

Jost Capito (born 29 September 1958) is a German former motorsport manager. Capito has been employed in various roles during his career, with his most successful role being Director of Motorsport at Volkswagen.

== Motorsport ==
Capito's first job in motorsport began in 1985 with BMW, working in the high-performance engine development sector. That year he also was part of the crew that won the truck class of the Paris–Dakar Rally. In 1989 he took his first post in the Volkswagen Group when he joined Porsche's racing division.

In 1996 Capito moved to Sauber as a member of the executive committee. He subsequently moved to Ford, where he stayed for a decade and where he was responsible for pushing through development of the Focus Mk1 RS, which in its WRC form took the World Rally Championship manufacturers' crown in 2006 and 2007.

Capito joined Volkswagen in May 2012. During his time there, Volkswagen dominated in the World Rally Championship, winning a hat-trick of both Drivers and Constructors Championships.

In January 2016, it was announced that Capito would join McLaren, although it was also confirmed that Capito would not join McLaren until Volkswagen had appointed his successor. In June of that year Capito confirmed with Autosport that he would leave Volkswagen after the Rallye Deutschland, adding that he expected to be in place at McLaren for the Belgian Grand Prix in late August. He celebrated victory for Volkswagen driver Sébastien Ogier at this final WRC event of his career.

Capito officially began his new role within McLaren on 1 September 2016. His first race weekend with his new team was the Italian Grand Prix. On 19 December 2016, McLaren announced that Capito had left his position.

On 17 December 2020, Capito was announced as the new CEO of the Williams Racing Formula One team. In June 2021, he became team principal. In December 2022 it was announced that Capito would leave Williams.
