= François-Xavier Demaison (engineer) =

French engineer

- Born: France
- Occupation: Engineer
- Years active: 2004–present
- Employer: Hyundai Motorsport
- Known for: motor racing engineer
- Title: Technical director

François-Xavier Demaison also known as FX Demaison is a French motor racing engineer. Since 2023, he is serving as the technical director of Hyundai Motorsport. From 2021 to 2022 he was the technical director at the Williams Racing Formula One team.

== Career ==
Demaison started his career in motorsports working for Peugeot Sport as Chief Rally engineer before moving to Subaru World Rally Team in March 2006 in an identical position. In 2008 he joined the Citroën Junior Team as a senior engineer for two seasons before becoming technical director for Petter Solberg World Rally Team in 2010.

Demaison moved to Volkswagen Motorsport in 2011 as WRC Project Manager, and then in 2016 became Technical Director with overall responsibility for all of the brand’s motorsport projects. Whilst at Volkswagen Motorsport, Demaison was instrumental in the creation for the dominant Volkswagen Polo R WRC, which won all three titles in the World Rally Championship four times in a row from 2013 to 2016. He also helped pioneer the groundbreaking Volkswagen I.D. R electric race car, that achieved multiple records at Pikes Peak and the Nürburgring.

In March 2021 Demaison reunited with his old boss Jost Capito at Williams Racing becoming Technical Director. In his role he is responsible for the design and development of the car as well as trackside engineering.

In December 2022, he left Williams Racing, along with Capito.

In May 2023 he was appointed as technical director of Hyundai Motorsport. In his role, Demaison will manage the vehicle and powertrain departments for the marque’s motorsport activities. He will also play a role in determining Hyundai’s future motorsport programmes alongside team principal Cyril Abiteboul and Hyundai Motorsport president Sean Kim.
