= Adam Kenyon =

British Formula One aerodynamicist

- Education: University of Cambridge, Imperial College London
- Occupation: Aerodynamicist
- Employer: Williams Racing
- Known for: Formula One engineer
- Title: Head of aerodynamics

Adam Kenyon is a British Formula One aerodynamicist. He is currently the head of aerodynamics for the Williams Racing Formula One team.

== Career ==
Kenyon studied engineering at the University of Cambridge and later undertook doctoral research in aerodynamics at Imperial College London, earning a PhD.

He began his motorsport career in 2008 as a CFD Engineer at Red Bull Racing, where he worked on computational fluid dynamics applications for car aerodynamic development. In 2011, he joined the Lotus F1 Team as a CFD Aerodynamicist, before being promoted to Senior CFD Aerodynamicist in 2013. During this period, he contributed to the team’s aerodynamic development through CFD-based analysis and simulation. Kenyon moved to Mercedes in 2013 as a Senior CFD Aerodynamicist. He was later appointed Aerodynamics Group Leader in 2018, a role he held until 2021, overseeing aerodynamic development activities during a period of sustained competitive success for the team.

In 2021, Kenyon joined Williams Racing as Head of Aerodynamic Science. He was promoted to Chief Aerodynamicist in 2022, before being appointed Head of Aerodynamics in April 2024. In this role, he leads the team’s aerodynamic department and overall aero development programme.
