= David Worner =

British engineer

- Born: 30 April 1962 (age 64); Kingswood, United Kingdom
- Occupation: Formula One engineer

David Worner (born 30 April 1962) is a retired British Formula One engineer. He was most recently engineering director at Williams Racing and previously spent 17 years at Red Bull Racing.

== Career ==
Worner started his engineering career with Rolls-Royce Holdings, spending eighteen years with the company from 1979. He moved to motorsport with Arrows International as a Design Engineer before moving to Jaguar Racing in 2003. He remained with the team following its transition into Red Bull Racing in 2004, where he initially served as Senior Suspension Designer, contributing to the early development of the team's chassis and mechanical systems. In 2007, Worner was promoted to Head of Suspension and Driver Control, overseeing suspension design, vehicle dynamics integration, and driver interface systems as Red Bull Racing began its rise towards the front of the grid. In 2014, Worner was promoted to Deputy Chief Designer, later taking responsibility for the technical synergy programme between Red Bull and Scuderia Toro Rosso, aimed at aligning design and development processes across the two teams.

In 2020, Worner joined Williams Racing as Chief Designer, playing a key role in the team's technical rebuild and recovery following several difficult seasons. Following the departure of François-Xavier Demaison at the end of 2022, Worner stepped in as interim Technical Director until the arrival of Pat Fry. He subsequently transitioned into the role of engineering director before retiring at the end of 2025.
