= David Wheater (engineer) =

British engineer

- Citizenship: British
- Education: University of Cambridge
- Occupation: Aerodynamics engineer
- Employer: PhysicsX
- Title: Delivery consultant

David Wheater is a British Formula One and aerodynamics engineer. He is currently working as a consultant for PhysicsX and previously served as Technical Director - Aerodynamics and Head of Aerodynamics for Alpine F1 Team and Williams Racing respectively.

== Career ==
Wheater began his motorsport career after graduating in Aeronautical Engineering from the University of Cambridge, joining the Enstone-based Benetton Formula in 2000 as an Aerodynamicist. After the team transitioned into Renault F1 Team, Wheater was promoted to Aerodynamics Team Leader in 2003 working on one of two aerodynamic development groups alongside Nicolas Hennel. He played a key role in the team's aerodynamic development during its championship-winning period in the mid-2000s. In 2006, Wheater was promoted Deputy Head of Aerodynamics, a position he held until 2013, overseeing major aerodynamic programmes and the integration of wind tunnel and CFD development across the team.

Seeking a new challenge, Wheater later joined Williams Racing in December 2013 as Head of Aerodynamic Performance. In 2018, he was promoted to Aerodynamics Director, leading the department through a period of organisational restructuring, new ownership, and significant technical investment. He remained in the role until January 2023, having spent over nine years with the team.

In September 2023, Wheater joined Alpine F1 Team as Principal Aerodynamicist, before being promoted to Technical Director – Aerodynamics in March 2024. In August 2025, he moved to PhysicsX, a technology company specialising in AI-driven engineering and simulation.
