= Dave Robson =

British Formula One engineer

- Born: 16 October 1976 (age 49)
- Occupation: Engineer
- Employer: Williams Racing
- Known for: Formula One engineer
- Title: Chief engineer

Dave Robson (born 16 October 1976) is a British Formula One engineer. He is currently the Chief Engineer for the Williams Racing Formula One team.

== Career ==
Robson studied Engineering Science at the University of Oxford. After he graduated, he began working in Formula One with McLaren Racing in 2000, initially as a Junior Stress Engineer. He then progressed through the stress department, before working in test engineering and then performance engineer to Heikki Kovalainen in 2008 to 2009. He took on the same position with Jenson Button when he joined the team in 2010, before quickly being promoted to being his race engineer. He served in this position from 2010 to 2014; the partnership achieving many successful results and second place in the 2011 season.

In 2015, Robson joined Williams Racing as a Race Engineer, working with Felipe Massa. He was promoted to Principal Engineer in 2018, then to Head of Vehicle Performance in 2019, overseeing car setup, vehicle dynamics, and performance analysis. In 2024, Robson was appointed Chief Engineer at Williams, responsible for coordinating engineering operations across the team's technical departments and trackside activities on an alternative year basis.
