= Williams FW40 =

Williams Formula One car

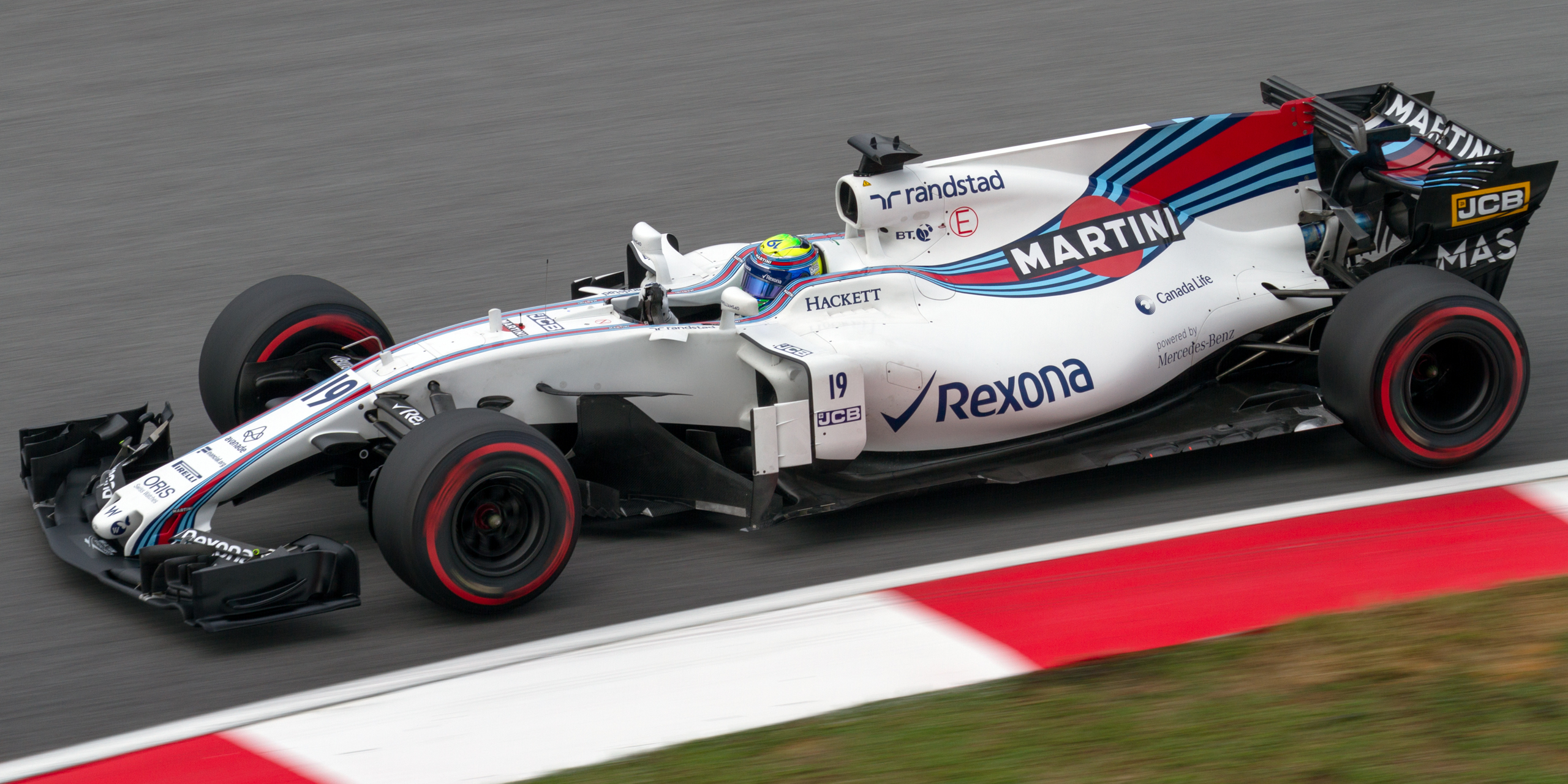
- Felipe Massa driving the FW40 at the Malaysian Grand Prix
- Category: Formula One
- Constructor: Williams
- Designers: Pat Symonds (Chief Technical Officer); Ed Wood (Chief Designer); Clive Cooper (Head of Design - Composites and Structures); Christopher Brawn (Head of Design - Suspension, Steering, Breaks); Mark Loasby (Head of Design - Systems); Richard Ashford (Head of Design - Transmission); Jakob Andreasen (Chief Performance & Operations Engineer); Jason Somerville (Head of Aerodynamics); David Wheater (Head of Aerodynamic Performance)
- Predecessor: Williams FW38
- Successor: Williams FW41

Technical specifications
- Chassis: Monocoque construction laminated from carbon epoxy and honeycomb surpassing FIA impact and strength requirements
- Suspension (front): Double wishbone, push-rod activated springs and anti-roll bar
- Suspension (rear): Same as front
- Length: 3545mm
- Width: 2000mm
- Height: 950mm
- Engine: Mercedes-AMG F1 M08 EQ Power+, Internal Combustion Engine 1.6 L (98 cu in), Cylinders Six, Bank angle 90, No of valves 24. High-pressure direct injection V6 turbocharged engine, limited to 15,000 rpm in a mid-mounted, rear-wheel drive layout
- Electric motor: Mercedes AMG HPP Kinetic and thermal energy recovery systems
- Transmission: Williams eight speed seamless sequential semi-automatic shift plus reverse gear, gear selection electro-hydraulically actuated
- Weight: 1,602 lbs
- Fuel: Petronas Primax
- Brakes: AP 6 piston front and 4 piston rear calipers with carbon discs and pads
- Tyres: Pirelli Fronts: 305/670-13, Rears: 405/670-13

Competition history
- Notable entrants: Williams Martini Racing
- Notable drivers: 18. (Canada) Lance Stroll; 19. (Brazil) Felipe Massa; 40. (United Kingdom) Paul Di Resta
- Debut: 2017 Australian Grand Prix
- Last event: 2017 Abu Dhabi Grand Prix
Races	Wins	Podiums	Poles	F/Laps
20	0	1	0	0

The Williams FW40 was a Formula One racing car designed by Williams to compete in the 2017 Formula One season. The car was predominantly driven by Felipe Massa and Lance Stroll, who made his Formula One début with the team.

The FW40 was the first Williams F1 car featured with a shark fin since the FW32 in 2010.

== Background ==
The number '40' in the chassis name signified the 40th anniversary of the team. In addition, it was the last Formula One car that Massa drove in his career, as he announced his retirement for a second time in November. In Belgium, the car appeared in British motorcycle rider Guy Martin's series Speed with Guy Martin.

== Competition history ==
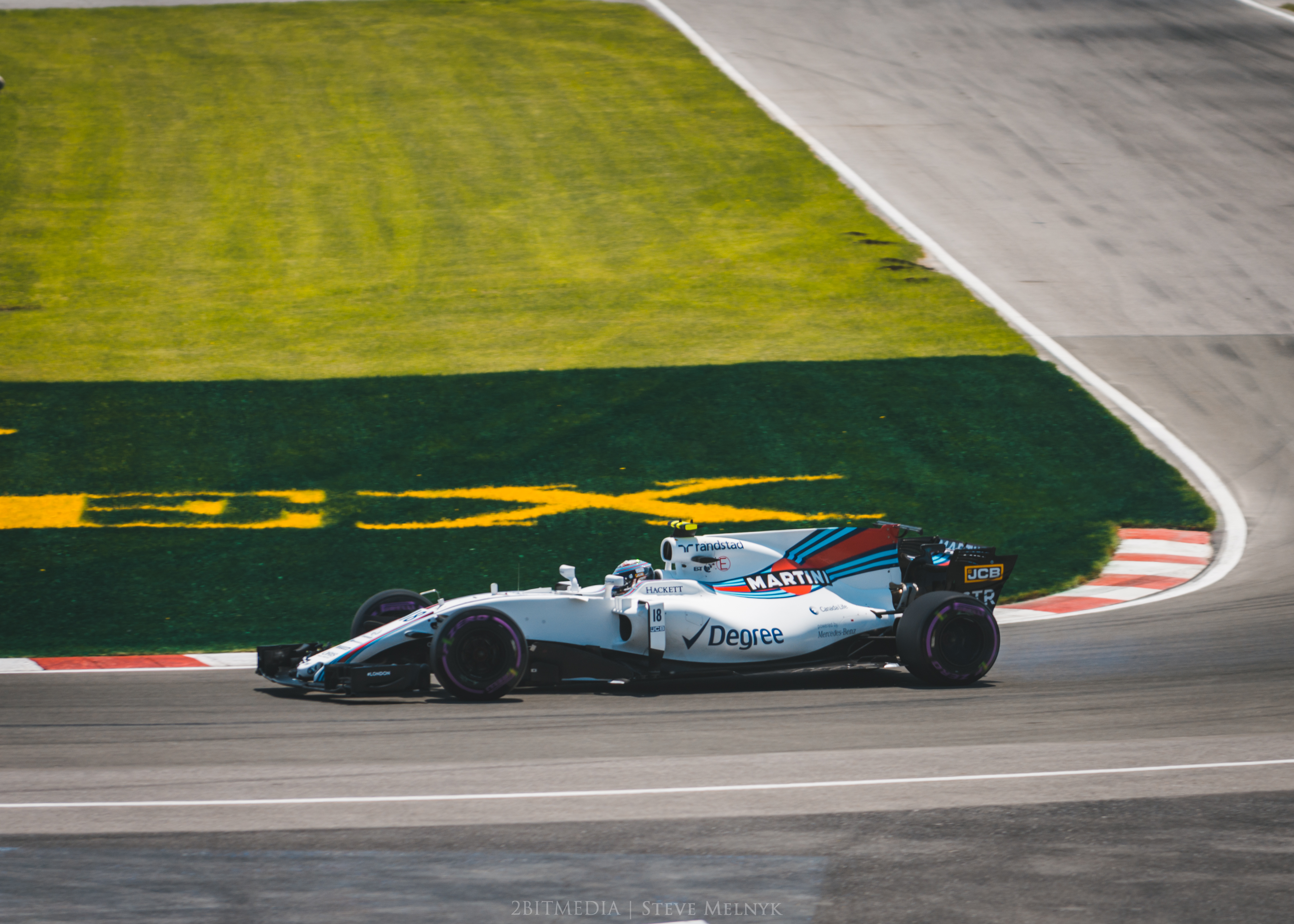
Stroll scored his first F1 points at the Canadian Grand Prix

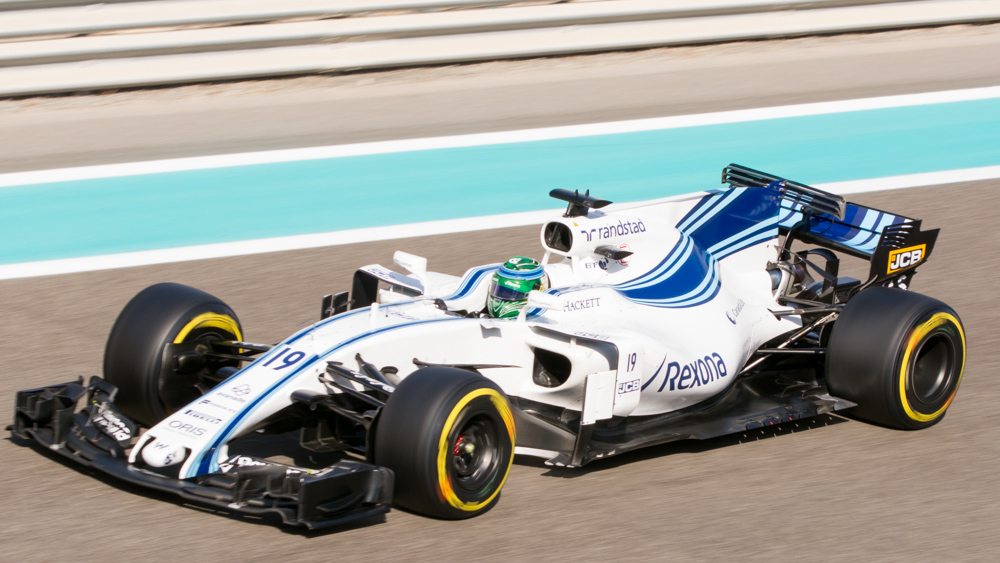
Felipe Massa driving the FW40 at his last race in Formula 1

Williams started the season as the fourth quickest team ahead of arch rivals Force India. However, the team could not finish consistently in the points, and Lance Stroll finished only thrice in the first 7 races. This saw the team languishing in 6th in the Constructors' Championship behind Toro Rosso and 49 points behind Force India.

At the Canadian Grand Prix, Stroll earned his first F1 points by finishing in ninth. Stroll earned his first podium by finishing third in the chaotic Azerbaijan Grand Prix. By doing so, Stroll became the second youngest driver to be on the podium, and the youngest driver on the podium in his debut season. This result brought Williams up to 5th in the Constructors' standings, behind Force India but ahead of Toro Rosso.

At the Hungarian Grand Prix, Massa withdrew from the race weekend when he became ill after the third practice session on Saturday. Williams confirmed reserve driver and Sky Sports F1 pundit Paul di Resta would replace Massa for the rest of the weekend. It was his first appearance in an F1 car in a competitive session in 3 years, and was his first time driving the 2017 spec-car.

== Sponsorship and livery ==
For the fourth year, Martini remained as the team's title sponsor. Alcohol laws meant Williams could not use their red Martini stripes in Abu Dhabi, instead using a blue livery. Petrobras sponsorship were dropped as the team now utilized Petronas fuels.

== Complete Formula One results ==
(key) (results in bold indicate pole position; results in italics indicate fastest lap)

Year	Entrant	Engine	Tyres	Drivers	Grands Prix																				Points	WCC
Year	Entrant	Engine	Tyres	Drivers	AUS	CHN	BHR	RUS	ESP	MON	CAN	AZE	AUT	GBR	HUN	BEL	ITA	SIN	MAL	JPN	USA	MEX	BRA	ABU	Points	WCC
2017	Williams Martini Racing	Mercedes M08 EQ Power+	**P**																							
2017	Williams Martini Racing	Mercedes M08 EQ Power+	**P**	Felipe Massa	6	14	6	9	13	9	Ret	Ret	9	10	WD	8	8	11	9	10	9	11	7	10	83	5th
2017	Williams Martini Racing	Mercedes M08 EQ Power+	**P**	Lance Stroll	Ret	Ret	Ret	11	16	15^{†}	9	3	10	16	14	11	7	8	8	Ret	11	6	16	18	83	5th
2017	Williams Martini Racing	Mercedes M08 EQ Power+	**P**	Paul di Resta											Ret										83	5th

^{†} Driver failed to finish the race, but was classified as they had completed greater than 90% of the race distance.
