= Williams FW41 =

2018 Formula One racing car

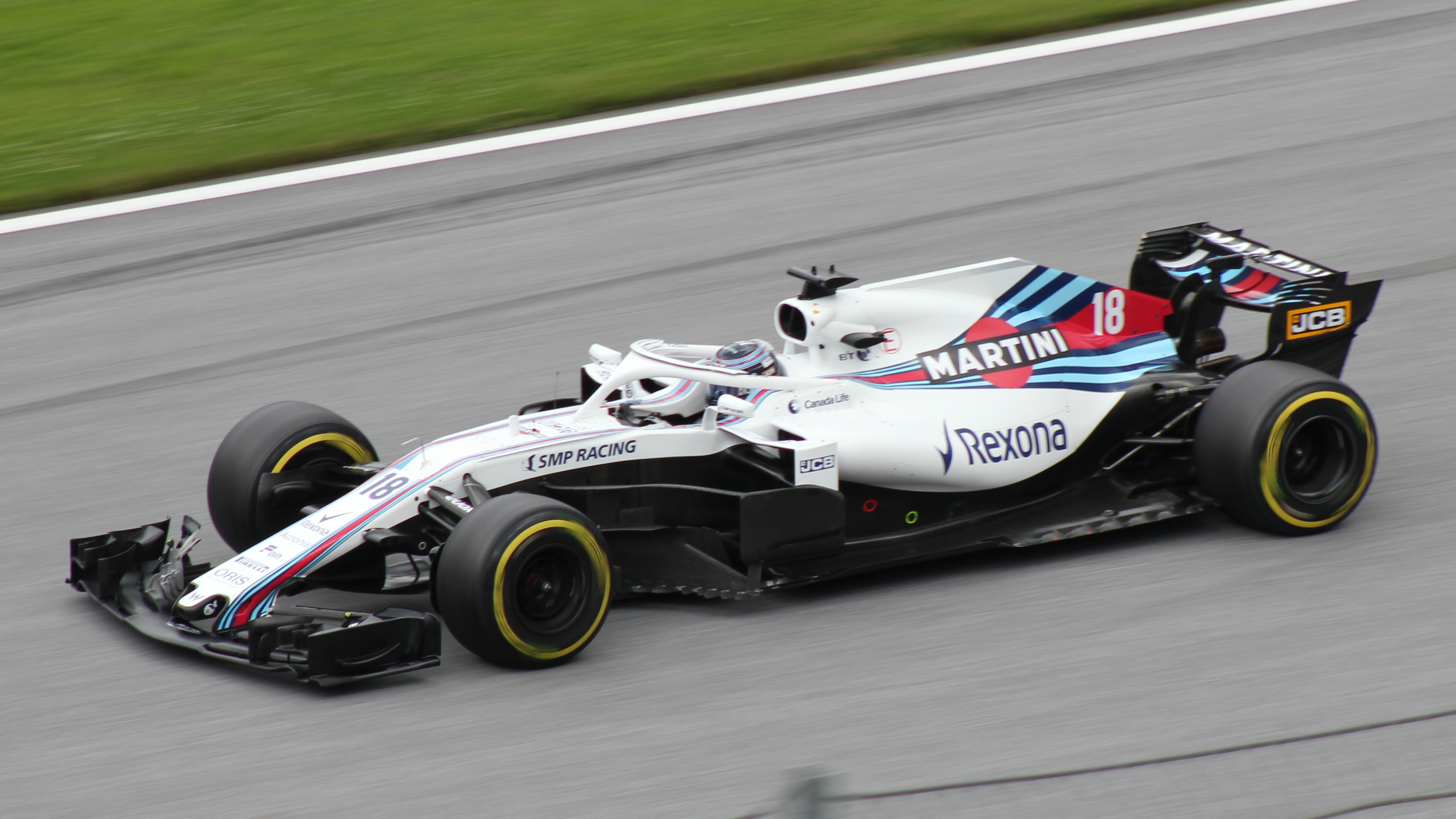
- The FW41, driven by Lance Stroll, during the Austrian Grand Prix
- Category: Formula One
- Constructor: Williams–Mercedes
- Designers: Paddy Lowe (Chief Technical Officer); Ed Wood (Chief Designer); Clive Cooper (Head of Design - Composites and Structures); Christopher Brawn (Head of Design - Suspension, Steering, Breaks); Mark Loasby (Head of Design - Systems); Richard Ashford (Head of Design - Transmission); Jakob Andreasen (Chief Performance & Operations Engineer); Dirk de Beer (Head of Aerodynamics); David Wheater (Head of Aerodynamic Performance)
- Predecessor: Williams FW40
- Successor: Williams FW42

Technical specifications
- Chassis: Carbon-fibre monocoque, laminated from carbon epoxy and honeycomb
- Suspension (front): Upper and lower wishbones, inboard springs and dampers actuated by push-rods
- Suspension (rear): Upper and lower wishbones, inboard springs and dampers actuated by pull-rods
- Width: 2,000 mm (79 in)
- Height: 950 mm (37 in)
- Engine: Mercedes M09 EQ Power+ 1.6 L (98 cu in) direct injection V6 turbocharged engine limited to 15,000 RPM in a mid-mounted, rear-wheel drive layout
- Electric motor: Mercedes kinetic and thermal energy recovery systems
- Transmission: Williams eight speed seamless sequential semi-automatic shift plus reverse gear, gear selection electro-hydraulically actuated
- Weight: 733 kg (1,616 lb)
- Fuel: Petronas Primax
- Brakes: AP 6 piston front and 4 piston rear calipers with carbon discs and pads
- Tyres: Pirelli P Zero (dry); Pirelli Cinturato (wet); Dicastal forged magnesium wheels: 13"

Competition history
- Notable entrants: Williams Martini Racing
- Notable drivers: 18. (Canada) Lance Stroll; 35. (Russia) Sergey Sirotkin
- Debut: 2018 Australian Grand Prix
- Last event: 2018 Abu Dhabi Grand Prix
Races	Wins	Podiums	Poles	F/Laps
21	0	0	0	0

The Williams FW41 is a Formula One racing car designed by Paddy Lowe and Dirk de Beer for the Williams team, to compete in the 2018 FIA Formula One World Championship. The car made its competitive debut at the Australian Grand Prix, and was driven by Lance Stroll in his second season with the team; and Sergey Sirotkin, making his competitive debut in Formula One. The FW41, while reliable, lacked the necessary pace to challenge the other cars over the course of the season.

== Design and development ==
In signing Sergey Sirotkin, Williams formed an alliance with Russian racing outfit SMP Racing, which came with financial investment in the team. While discussing the investment, SMP Racing revealed that under the terms of the agreement their investment would specifically be spent on technical development of the FW41 instead of being used to cover the costs of day-to-day operations.

Testing and development work was carried out by Robert Kubica. The role was Kubica's first with a Formula One team since his 2011 rallying accident that almost resulted in the traumatic amputation of his arm.

The Mercedes-powered Williams FW41 features the mandatory Halo cockpit protection device, painted white so it is incorporated into the team's livery design, which sports blacker on the front wing, bargeboards and around the sidepods for 2018.

The car had problems with its development mainly being cooling, packaging and the aerodynamics which resulted in its uncompetitiveness.

== Competition history ==
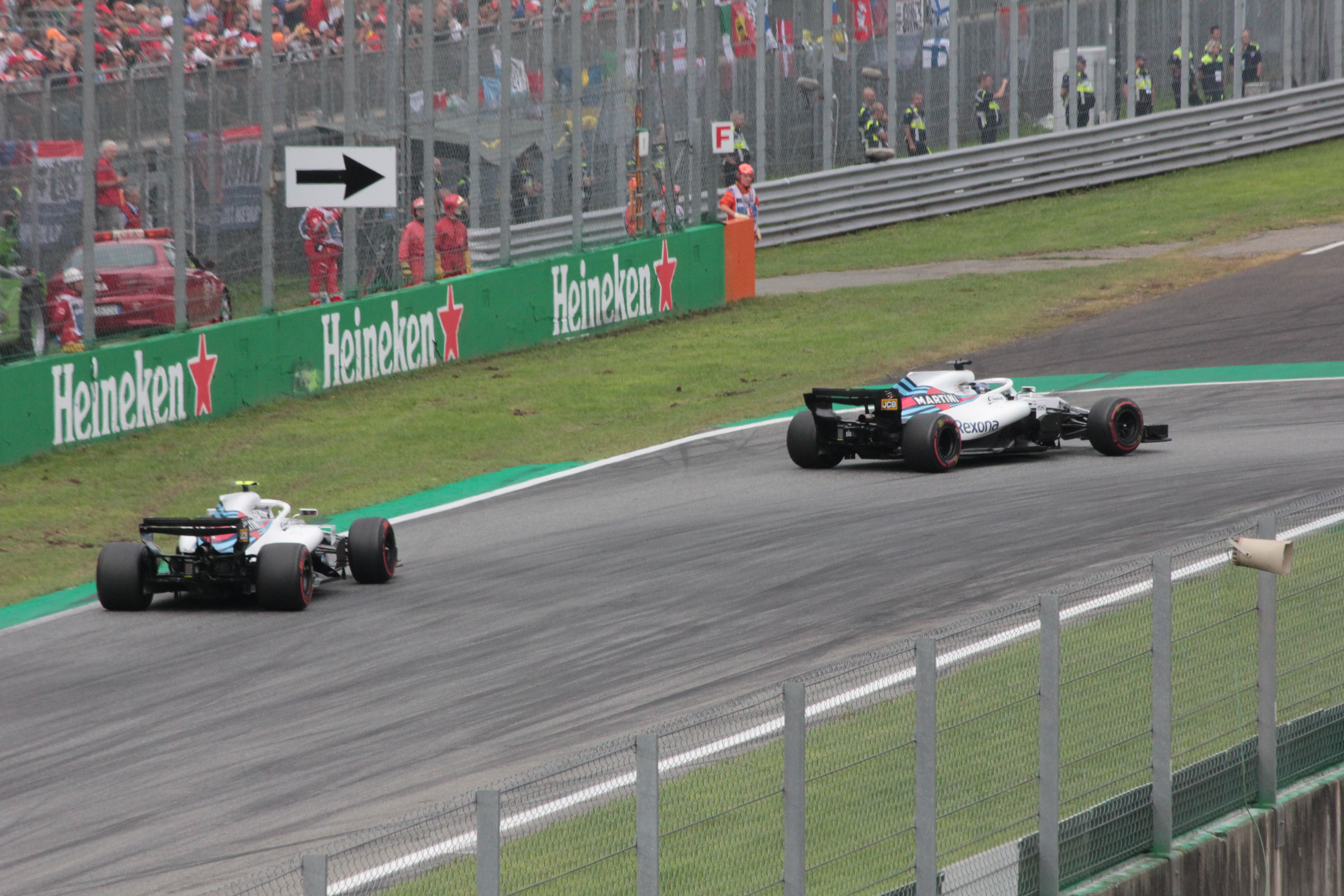
Stroll and Sirotkin in action during the Italian Grand Prix which would turn out to be the only double-points finish for the team that season

Williams had finished fifth in the Constructors Championship in both 2016 and 2017, but saw their performance decline severely in 2018. Although the car had good reliability like Mercedes and Force India, its pace was poor, and the team ended up at the back of the field mostly fighting the Toro Rossos. Their first points came in Azerbaijan when Stroll finished 8th. The team would not score points again until Italy, when Stroll and Sirotkin finished 9th and 10th respectively. They finished 10th and last in the Constructors' Championship, their lowest ever position. However, the seven points they scored exceeded the five points scored in both 2011 and 2013.

== Sponsorship and livery ==
This was the fifth and final Williams car featuring a Martini livery as the team decided to not renew the sponsorship deal. Alcohol laws meant Williams could not use their red Martini stripes in France and Abu Dhabi, instead using a blue livery.

== Complete Formula One results ==
(key) (results in bold indicate pole position; results in italics indicate fastest lap)

Year	Entrant	Engine	Tyres	Drivers	Grands Prix																					Points	WCC
Year	Entrant	Engine	Tyres	Drivers	AUS	BHR	CHN	AZE	ESP	MON	CAN	FRA	AUT	GBR	GER	HUN	BEL	ITA	SIN	RUS	JPN	USA	MEX	BRA	ABU	Points	WCC
2018	Williams Martini Racing	Mercedes	**P**	Sirotkin	Ret	15	15	Ret	14	16	17	15	13	14	Ret	16	12	10	19	18	16	13	13	16	15	7	10th
2018	Williams Martini Racing	Mercedes	**P**	Stroll	14	14	14	8	11	17	Ret	17^{†}	14	12	Ret	17	13	9	14	15	17	14	12	18	13	7	10th

^{†} Driver failed to finish the race, but was classified as they had completed more than 90% of the race distance.
