= Williams FW37 =

Formula One Car for 2015 season

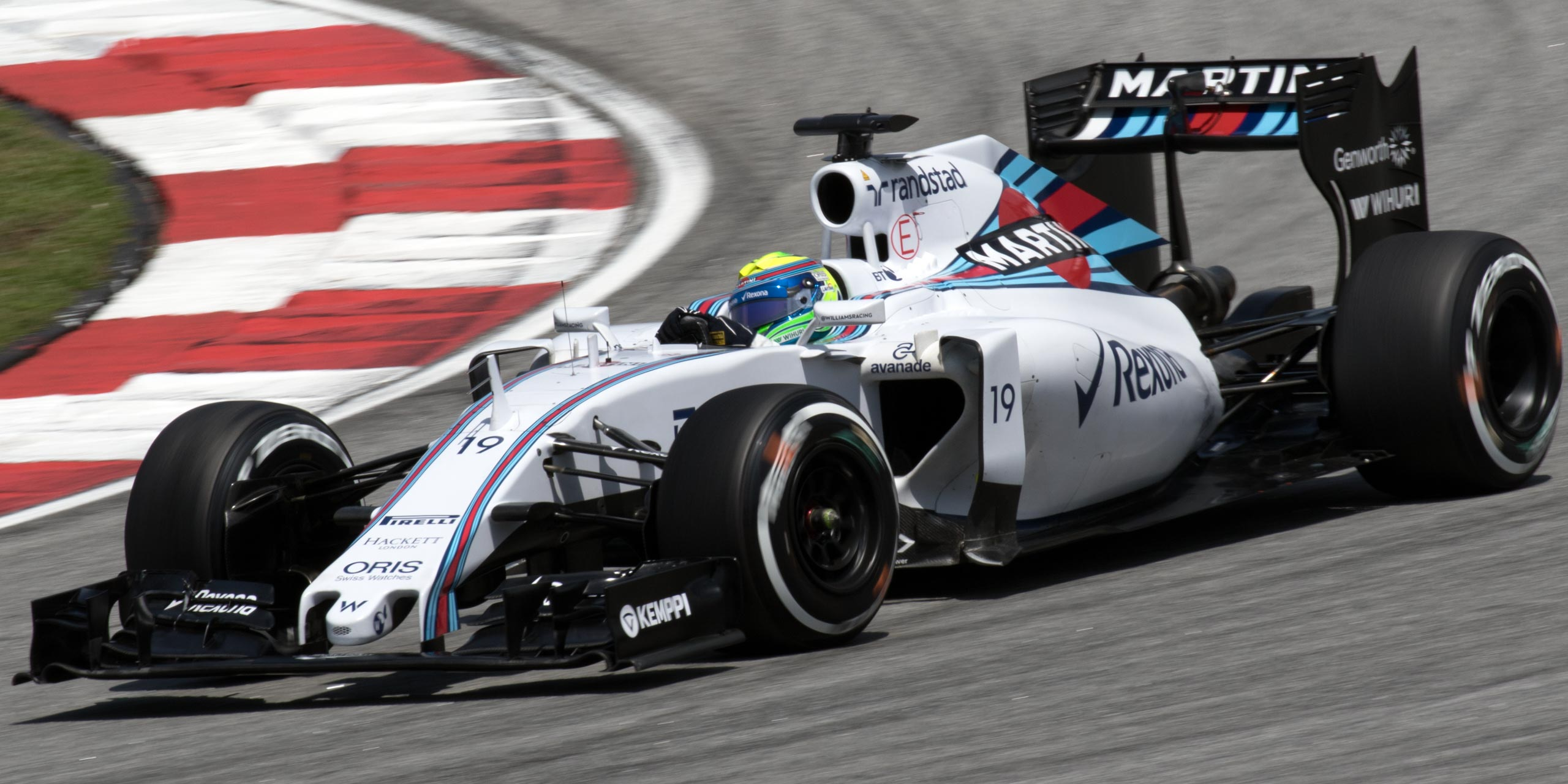
- Felipe Massa driving the FW37 at the Malaysian Grand Prix
- Category: Formula One
- Constructor: Williams
- Designers: Pat Symonds (Chief Technical Officer); Ed Wood (Chief Designer); Clive Cooper (Head of Design - Composites and Structures); Christopher Brawn (Head of Design - Suspension, Steering, Breaks); Mark Loasby (Head of Design - Systems); Richard Ashford (Head of Design - Transmission); Jakob Andreasen (Chief Performance & Operations Engineer); Jason Somerville (Head of Aerodynamics); David Wheater (Head of Aerodynamic Performance)
- Predecessor: Williams FW36
- Successor: Williams FW38

Technical specifications
- Chassis: Carbon epoxy and honeycomb monocoque
- Suspension (front): Double wishbone suspension, with push-rod activated springs and Williams dampers
- Suspension (rear): Double wishbone suspension, with pull-rod activated springs and Williams dampers
- Length: 5,000 mm (196.9 in)
- Width: 1,800 mm (70.9 in)
- Height: 950 mm (37.4 in)
- Engine: Mercedes PU106B Hybrid Turbo 1.6 L (98 cu in) V6 engine (90°), limited to 15,000 RPM in a mid-mounted, rear-wheel drive layout
- Electric motor: Mercedes PU106B Hybrid Motor Generator Unit–Kinetic (MGU-K) Mercedes PU106B Hybrid Motor Generator Unit–Heat (MGU-H)
- Transmission: Williams 8-speed sequential semi-automatic
- Fuel: Petrobras
- Tyres: Pirelli P Zero (dry), Cinturato (wet)

Competition history
- Notable entrants: Williams Martini Racing
- Notable drivers: 19. (Brazil) Felipe Massa; 77. (Finland) Valtteri Bottas
- Debut: 2015 Australian Grand Prix
- Last event: 2015 Abu Dhabi Grand Prix
| Races | Wins | Podiums | Poles | F/Laps |
|---|---|---|---|---|
| 19 | 0 | 4 | 0 | 0 |

The Williams FW37 is a Formula One racing car designed by Williams Grand Prix Engineering which Williams Martini Racing used to compete in the 2015 Formula One season. It was driven by Valtteri Bottas and Felipe Massa. It proved to be competitive, with the team scoring 4 podiums, and finishing the 2015 season in 3rd.

The car was launched on 1 February 2015.

== Design ==
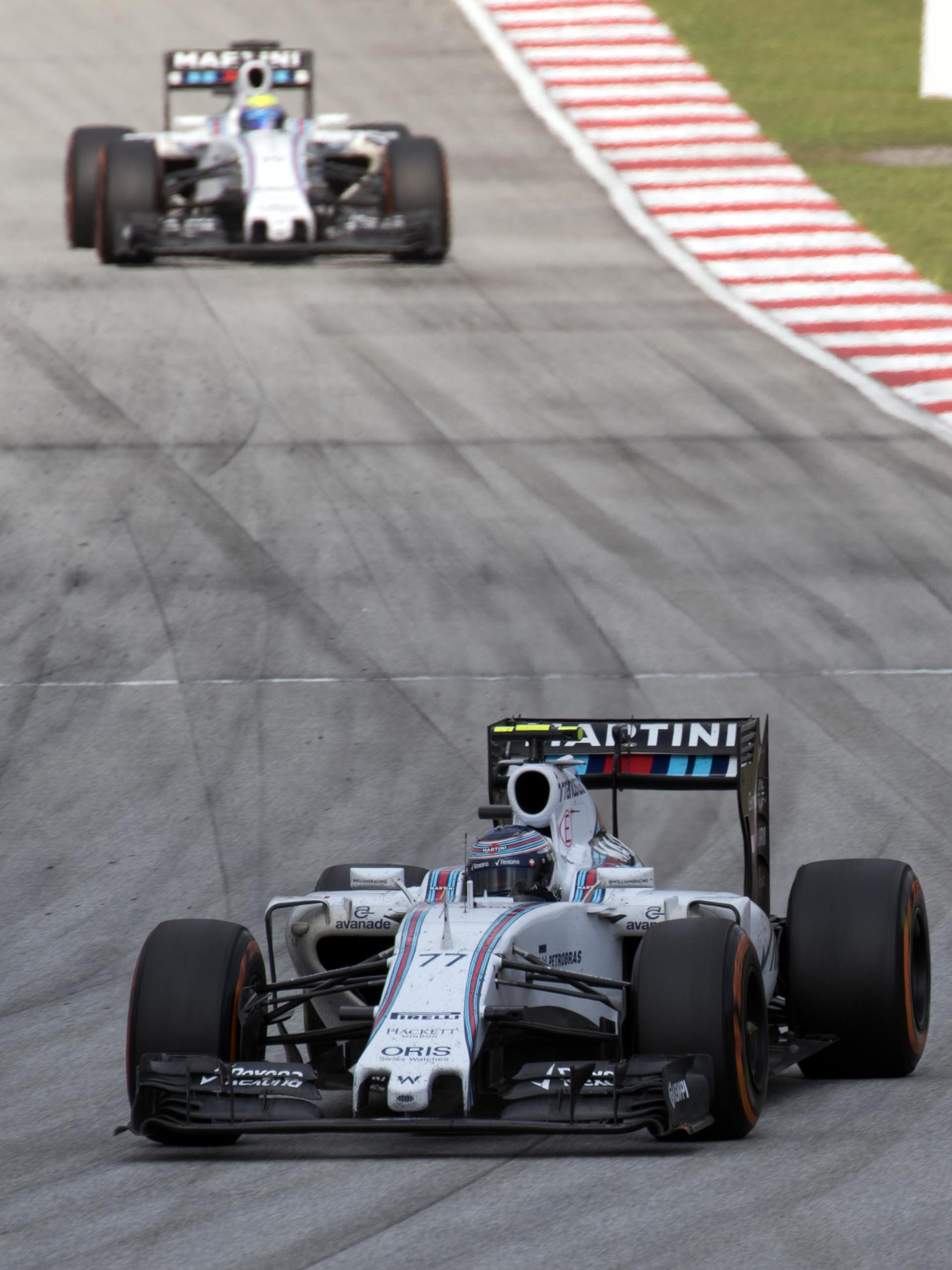
Valtteri Bottas leads teammate Felipe Massa at the Malaysian Grand Prix

Williams were first in presenting their 2015 car, releasing a computer rendering on 21 January 2015. The peculiar 'anteater' nose design of the 2014 car was dropped in favour of a lower and shorter one.

== Racing history ==
A reasonably competitive car that finished in the points at almost every race, it ultimately helped the team secure its second consecutive third-place finish with 257 points in the Constructors' Championship. The team achieved 4 podium finishes, two each for both Massa and Bottas. The team proved arguably less competitive late in the season as they shifted development towards the 2016 car relatively early. The car though was still highly competitive, it did not score as many points as its predecessor and was overshadowed by Mercedes and a resurgent Scuderia Ferrari.

== Sponsorship and livery ==
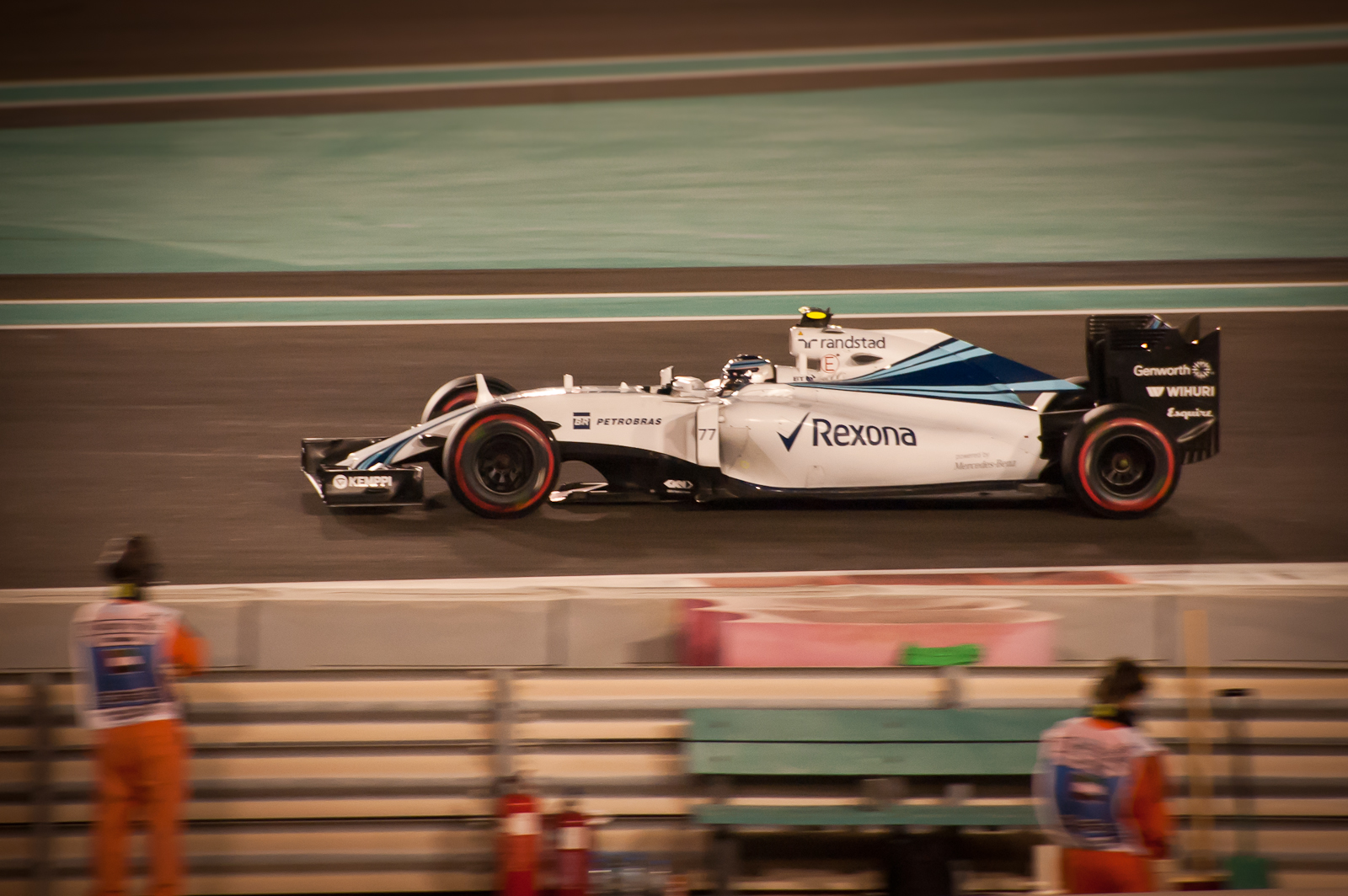
Bottas at the Abu Dhabi Grand Prix, notice the Martini branding is absent from the car to comply with local regulations

The Williams team retained the Martini alcohol brand as their main sponsor, thereby keeping the car in the traditional Martini Racing colours. Alcohol laws meant Williams could not use their red Martini stripes in Abu Dhabi, instead using a blue livery.

At the Mexican Grand Prix, to promote the film Spectre, the 007 logos featured on the side mirrors.

== Complete Formula One results ==
(key)

| Year | Entrant | Engine | Tyres | Drivers | 1 | 2 | 3 | 4 | 5 | 6 | 7 | 8 | 9 | 10 | 11 | 12 | 13 | 14 | 15 | 16 | 17 | 18 | 19 | Points | WCC |
|---|---|---|---|---|---|---|---|---|---|---|---|---|---|---|---|---|---|---|---|---|---|---|---|---|---|
| 2015 | Williams Martini Racing | Mercedes PU106B Hybrid | P | | AUS | MAL | CHN | BHR | ESP | MON | CAN | AUT | GBR | HUN | BEL | ITA | SIN | JPN | RUS | USA | MEX | BRA | ABU | 257 | 3rd |
| 2015 | Williams Martini Racing | Mercedes PU106B Hybrid | P | Felipe Massa | 4 | 6 | 5 | 10 | 6 | 15 | 6 | 3 | 4 | 12 | 6 | 3 | Ret | 17 | 4 | Ret | 6 | DSQ | 8 | 257 | 3rd |
| 2015 | Williams Martini Racing | Mercedes PU106B Hybrid | P | Valtteri Bottas | DNS | 5 | 6 | 4 | 4 | 14 | 3 | 5 | 5 | 13 | 9 | 4 | 5 | 5 | 12^{†} | Ret | 3 | 5 | 13 | 257 | 3rd |

^{†} Driver failed to finish the race, but was classified as they had completed greater than 90% of the race distance.
