= Williams FW38 =

Formula One racing car

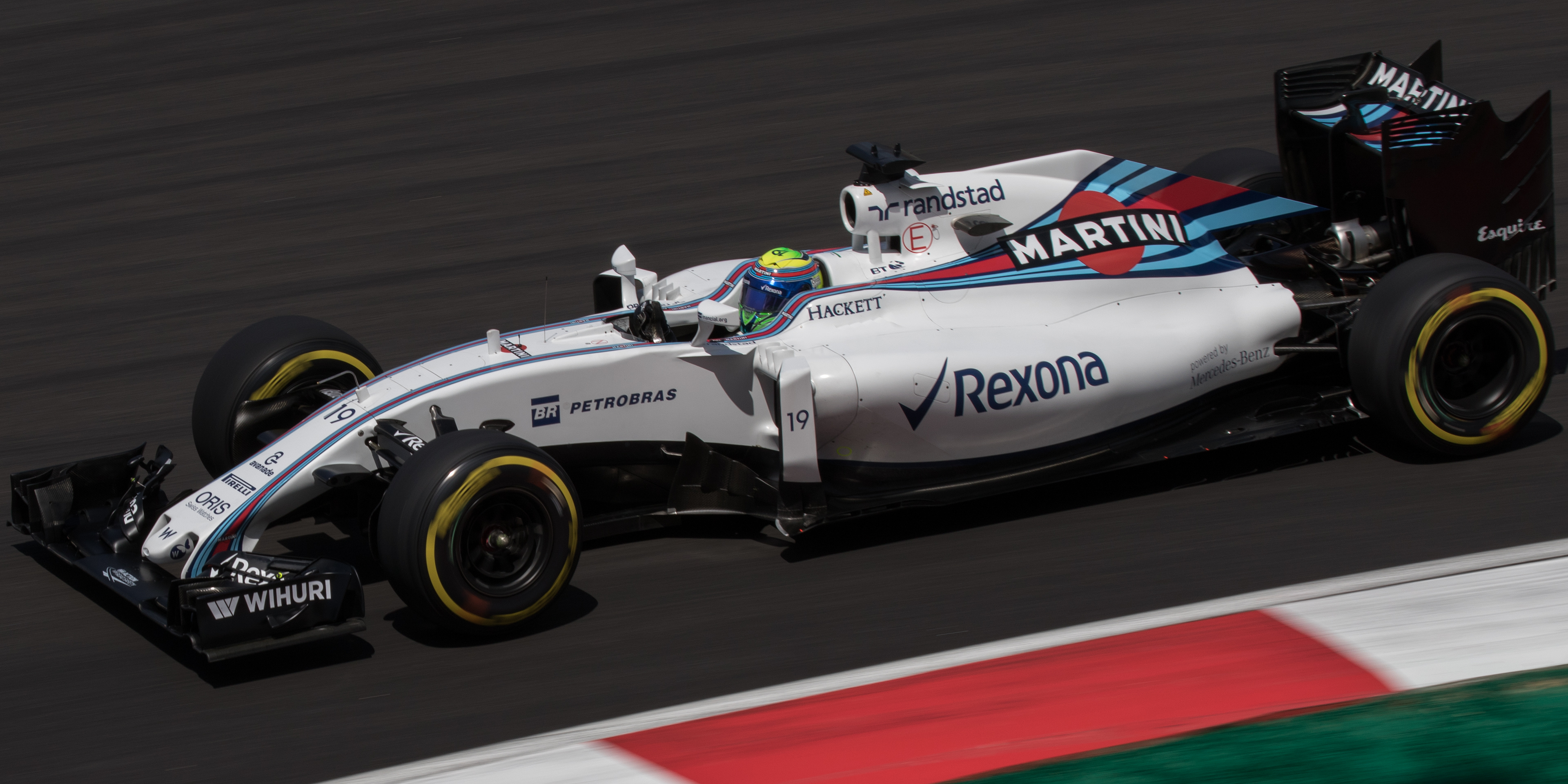
- The Williams FW38, driven by Felipe Massa, during the Malaysian Grand Prix
- Category: Formula One
- Constructor: Williams
- Designers: Pat Symonds (Chief Technical Officer); Ed Wood (Chief Designer); Clive Cooper (Head of Design - Composites and Structures); Christopher Brawn (Head of Design - Suspension, Steering, Breaks); Mark Loasby (Head of Design - Systems); Richard Ashford (Head of Design - Transmission); Jakob Andreasen (Chief Performance & Operations Engineer); Jason Somerville (Head of Aerodynamics); David Wheater (Head of Aerodynamic Performance)
- Predecessor: Williams FW37
- Successor: Williams FW40

Technical specifications
- Chassis: carbon-fibre composite and aluminium honeycomb monocoque
- Suspension (front): double wishbones, push-rod actuated springs and dampers, anti-roll bar
- Suspension (rear): same as front
- Engine: Mercedes PU106C Hybrid 1.6 L (98 cu in) direct injection V6 (90º) turbocharged engine, limited to 15,000 rpm in a mid-mounted, rear-wheel drive layout
- Electric motor: MERCEDES AMG HPP ERS Mercedes PU106C Hybrid Motor Generator Unit–Kinetic (MGU-K) Mercedes PU106C Hybrid Motor Generator Unit–Heat (MGU-H)
- Transmission: Williams 8-speed sequential semi-automatic Williams paddle-shift 8-speed semi-automatic
- Battery: Lithium-ion batteries
- Weight: 1,548 lbs
- Fuel: Petrobras
- Brakes: AP Racing ventilated carbon ceramic discs, 6-pot caliper
- Tyres: Pirelli P Zero (dry) tyres Pirelli Cinturato (wet) tyres Front:245/660 - 13 / Rear:325/660 - 13

Competition history
- Notable entrants: Williams Martini Racing
- Notable drivers: 19. (Brazil) Felipe Massa; 77. (Finland) Valtteri Bottas
- Debut: 2016 Australian Grand Prix
- Last event: 2016 Abu Dhabi Grand Prix
Races	Wins	Podiums	Poles	F/Laps
21	0	1	0	0

The Williams FW38 is a Formula One racing car designed by Williams to compete in the 2016 Formula One season. The car was driven by Felipe Massa and Valtteri Bottas.

During qualifying for the 2016 European Grand Prix, an FW38 driven by Bottas set the highest ever recorded speed of a Formula One car during an official session, at 378 km/h (235 mph)..

During the 2016 Mexican Grand Prix, an FW38, again driven by Bottas, set the second highest ever recorded speed of a Formula One car during a race, at 372.5 km/h (231.5 mph).

== History ==
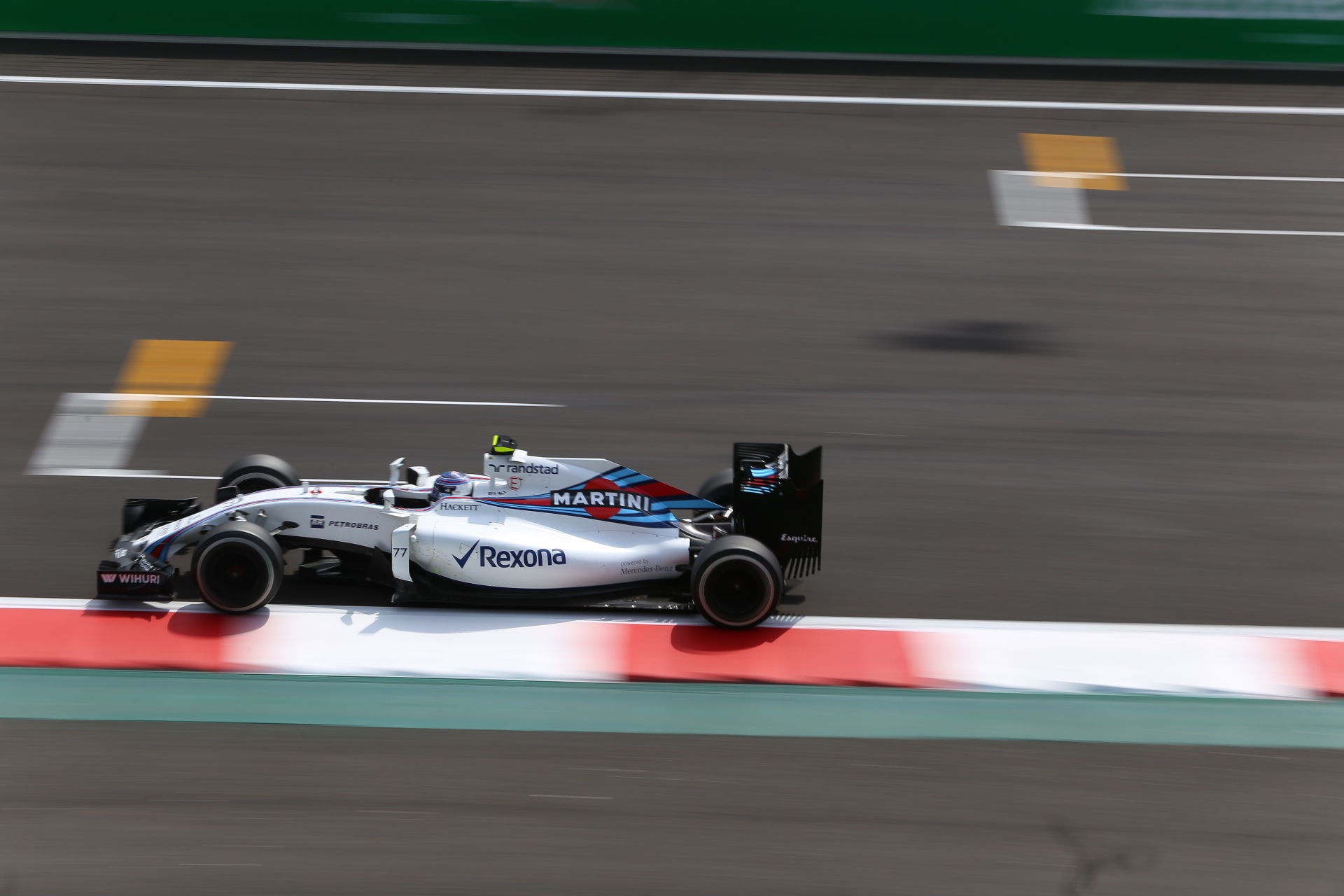
Bottas at the Mexican Grand Prix

The car proved to be competitive in the early stages of the championship, with Massa and Bottas securing points finishes for the first half of the season. However, lack of upgrades on the car meant that the team could not keep up with other teams during the later stages, such as Ferrari, Force India, and Red Bull Racing, and eventually lost 4th place in the constructors' championship to Force India.

=== Radical rear wing ===
On 17 May, two days after the Spanish Grand Prix, Williams tested a radical new rear wing design with a winglets on the side; similar to the cars from 1983-1984. The car was test driven by Alex Lynn.

== Sponsorship and livery ==
For the third year, Williams continued to use the Martini livery of their title sponsor. Alcohol laws meant Williams could not use their red Martini stripes in Abu Dhabi, instead using a blue livery.

At the Brazilian Grand Prix, Massa's car had his name placed on the engine cover and rear wing in place of the Martini logos, and text "Obrigado" (Portuguese for "thank you").

== Complete Formula One results ==
(key) (results in bold indicate pole position; results in italics indicate fastest lap)

Year	Entrant	Engine	Tyres	Drivers	Grands Prix																					Points	WCC
Year	Entrant	Engine	Tyres	Drivers	AUS	BHR	CHN	RUS	ESP	MON	CAN	EUR	AUT	GBR	HUN	GER	BEL	ITA	SIN	MAL	JPN	USA	MEX	BRA	ABU	Points	WCC
2016	Williams; Martini Racing	Mercedes; PU106C; Hybrid	**P**	Felipe Massa	5	8	6	5	8	10	Ret	10	20^{†}	11	18	Ret	10	9	12	13	9	7	9	Ret	9	138	5th
2016	Williams; Martini Racing	Mercedes; PU106C; Hybrid	**P**	Valtteri Bottas	8	9	10	4	5	12	3	6	9	14	9	9	8	6	Ret	5	10	16	8	11	Ret	138	5th

^{†} Driver failed to finish the race but was classified as they had completed greater than 90% of the race distance.
