= Speed with Guy Martin =

Channel 4 documentary series

- Genre: Documentary
- Presented by: Guy Martin
- Narrated by: Shaun Dooley
- Country of origin: United Kingdom
- Original language: English
- No. of seasons: 3
- No. of episodes: 12 (+3 specials)

Production
- Running time: 47 minutes

Original release
- Network: Channel 4
- Release: 29 December 2013 – present

Speed with Guy Martin is a British documentary series for Channel 4, presented by Guy Martin, and narrated by Shaun Dooley.

In this series, Guy Martin attempts four engineering challenges per season, based around the theme of speed, and occasionally joined by celebrity guests.

== Episodes ==
=== Series overview ===
Series	Episodes	Originally released	
Series	Episodes	First released	Last released
1	4	29 December 2013	19 January 2014
2	4	26 October 2014	16 November 2014
3	4	4 September 2016	9 October 2016

=== Series 1 (2013–14) ===
No. overall	No. in season	Title	Guest(s)	Original release date
1	1	"Britain's Fastest Cyclist"	Laura Trott	29 December 2013
Martin attempts to break the British record for speed on a bicycle of 110 mph (180 km/h). He does so at Pendine Sands, reaching a top speed of 112.94 mph (181.76 km/h) whilst slipstreaming a racing truck.
2	2	"Hydroplaning Bike"	None	5 January 2014
Martin attempts to set the world speed record for riding a motorcycle on water. He tries to do so on Bala Lake, Gwynedd.
3	3	"Human Powered Aircraft"	None	12 January 2014
Martin tries to construct the world's fastest human powered aircraft.
4	4	"World's Fastest Toboggan"	None	19 January 2014
Martin sets out to set the world speed record for fastest toboggan, he tries to do so down the Pista Riberal ski slope in the Andorran Pyrenees. He does so, setting a new record of 83.5 mph (134.4 km/h) – a 21.25 mph (34.20 km/h) improvement on the previous record of 62.25 mph (100.18 km/h).

=== Series 2 (2014) ===
No. overall	No. in season	Title	Guest(s)	Original release date
5	1	"Tandem"	Mike Burrows; Jason Miles	26 October 2014
Martin explores what distance is it possible to cycle during 24 hours of non-stop pedalling. Joined by a friend, and cycling in a custom tandem bicycle designed by Mike Burrows, the two break the world record by cycling 565 miles in 24 hours.
6	2	"Pike's Peak"	Sébastien Loeb; Scott Moran; Bobby Unser (Note: Despite appearing in the episode, Unser was not credited.)	2 November 2014
Martin builds a motorbike to compete in the 2014 Pikes Peak International Hill Climb in an attempt to win the Exhibition Motorcycle class. In preparation for the hill climb, Martin meets with Pike's Peak overall record holder (8m 13s) Sébastien Loeb, and former automobile racer Bobby Unser. In England, Martin constructs his bike, a turbocharged Suzuki GSX-R1100; Martin also modifies a room into a hypobaric chamber for altitude training on a bicycle. Martin wins his class in 11m 32.558s, becoming the first British winner of Pike's Peak.
7	3	"Hovercraft"	9 November 2014	
8	4	"Gravity Racer"	Amy Williams	16 November 2014
Martin attempts to break the world speed record for a gravity racer, set in 2012 by Doug Anderson at 84.4 mph (135.8 km/h) on a public road in North Carolina. A 2 km stretch of public road on Mont Ventoux, Southern France, is chosen to as the location for the record attempt, with a timing gate on the fastest 100m measuring the racer's average speed. Martin trains for the record attempt Pontrhyfendigiad, Ceredigion, under street luge champion Helene Schmit, reaching a top speed of 48 mph (77 km/h). While testing the racer at Harewood Hill Climb in Leeds, Martin reaches 38 mph (61 km/h). On the first day in France, Martin reaches a top speed of 71 mph (114 km/h) on his first run, and 77.2 mph (124.2 km/h) on his second, and 81.8 mph (131.6 km/h) on his third run, after five bottles of water are added to the racer as a ballast. On the second day, the tyre pressure of the racer is increased and a further 5.5 kg is added, and Martin sets a new record with a run of 85.6 mph (137.8 km/h), but Martin reports handling issues under braking again. It is decided to make a second run in order to find the racer's maximum speed, adding a further 10 kg and taking the total weight to 200 kg. During braking, the racer fishtails, spins around and hits the barrier, causing it to roll over several times before coming to rest on its roof, but still on the road. Martin emerges unscathed but the racer is damaged beyond use.

=== Series 3 (2016) ===
No. overall	No. in season	Title	Guest(s)	Original release date
10	1	"Transit Van"	None	4 September 2016
Martin enters his Transit van into the Nevada Open Road Challenge.
11	2	"Pedal-Powered Airship"	Stephane Rousson	25 September 2016
Martin attempts to become the first person to cross the English Channel in a man-powered airship, by pedaling a bike suspended from a helium-filled balloon the same size as a school bus.
12	3	"Human-Powered Boat"	Sir Chris Hoy; Sir Ben Ainslie	2 October 2016
With assistance from Sir Chris Hoy and Sir Ben Ainslie, Martin attempts to set the water speed record for a human-powered watercraft. Due to an excess amount of underwater weeds, Martin has to cancel his record attempt in Bayford Pool, Lincoln, England.
13	4	"World's Fastest Motorbike"	None	9 October 2016
Martin attempts to break the motorcycle land-speed record of 376.363 mph (605.698 km/h) in a Triumph Infor Rocket Streamliner at Bonneville Speedway, Utah. He fails to do so, crashing partway through a Fédération Internationale de Motocyclisme run; but sets a new speed record for Triumph Motorcycles, reaching a top speed of 274.2 mph (441.3 km/h), breaking the previous record of 245.6 mph (395.3 km/h).

=== Special episodes ===
No. overall	No. in season	Title	Guest(s)	Original release date
9	N–A	"Speed with Guy Martin: F1 Special"	David Coulthard	17 March 2016
Martin, on his Tyco BMW Superbike, takes on David Coulthard, in a Red Bull RB8, in a drag race, brake test, slalom, and a circuit race.
14	N–A	"Speed with Guy Martin: F1 Challenge"	None	17 September 2017
Martin joins the Williams F1 pit crew at the 2017 Belgian Grand Prix. Whilst doing so, Martin assists in setting up the pit garage, assisting in pit stops, and building and stripping the Williams FW40.
15	N–A	"Speed with Guy Martin: Classic F1 Special"	Jenson Button	27 August 2018
Martin rebuilds and learns how to drive a 1983 Williams FW08C, (Note: The Williams FW08C used in the episode is the same car that was driven by Keke Rosberg at the 1983 Monaco Grand Prix and by Ayrton Senna at Donington Park in 1983.) describing it as a "real privilege" to do so. Martin takes part in his first Formula 1 race, driving the Williams FW08C Formula One car, that he rebuilt, at Silverstone Circuit, against Jenson Button, who is in a banned six-wheel prototype Williams FW08B from 1983.

== Home media ==
On 8 June 2015, a boxset entitled Complete Speed with Guy Martin was released on DVD and Blu-ray in DVD region 0. It was composed of the first two series as a 2-disc box set.
