= Lance Stroll =

Canadian racing driver (born 1998)

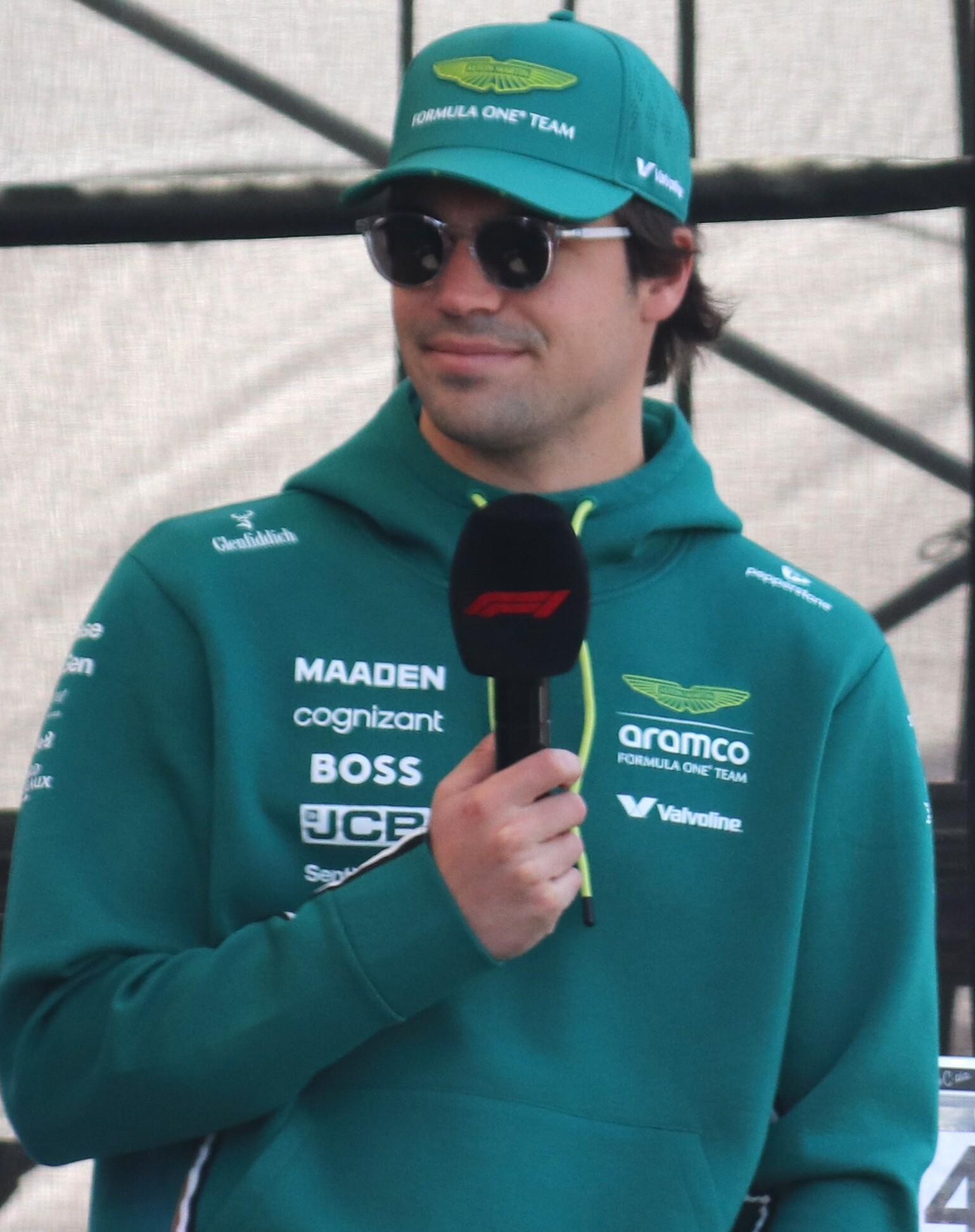
- Stroll in 2025
- Born: Lance Jacob Strulovitch; 29 October 1998 (age 28); Montreal, Quebec, Canada
- Parent: Lawrence Stroll (father)
- Relatives: Chloe Stroll (sister); Scotty James (brother-in-law)

Formula One World Championship career
- Nationality: (Canada) Canadian
- 2026 team: Aston Martin Aramco-Honda
- Car number: 18
- Entries: 213 (209 starts)
- Championships: 0
- Wins: 0
- Podiums: 3
- Career points: 325
- Pole positions: 1
- Fastest laps: 0
- First entry: 2017 Australian Grand Prix
- Last entry: 2026 São Paulo Grand Prix
- 2025 position: 16th (33 pts)

Previous series
- 2015–2016; 2015; 2014; 2014: FIA F3 European; Toyota Racing Series; Italian F4; Florida Winter Series

Championship titles
- 2016; 2015; 2015; 2014: FIA F3 European; Toyota Racing Series; Lady Wigram Trophy; Italian F4
- Website: www.lancestroll.com

Lance Jacob Strulovitch (born 29 October 1998), commonly known as Lance Stroll (/ˌstroʊl/), is a Canadian racing driver who competes in Formula One for Aston Martin.

Born and raised in Montreal, Stroll is the son of billionaire businessman Lawrence Stroll, owner of the Aston Martin F1 Team, and his Belgian ex-wife. Stroll began competitive kart racing aged 10, winning several regional and national titles. A member of the Ferrari Driver Academy since 2010, Stroll graduated to junior formulae in 2014, winning his first title at the Italian F4 Championship that year with Prema. He then won the Toyota Racing Series in 2015 with M2, and dominated the FIA Formula 3 European Championship in 2016 with Prema.

Following his record-breaking successes in Formula Three, (Note: Including most wins in a season (14), most fastest laps in a season (13, shared with Felix Rosenqvist), and largest championship-winning margin (187), all in the 2016 FIA Formula 3 European Championship.) Stroll signed for Williams in 2017 to partner Felipe Massa, making his Formula One debut at the Australian Grand Prix, aged 18. He scored his maiden podium finish in Azerbaijan that year, becoming the second-youngest driver to score a podium. Stroll finished a season-best eighth at the same Grand Prix in 2018, driving the FW41. After two seasons at Williams, Stroll signed for Racing Point—which had recently been acquired by his father—in 2019 to partner Sergio Pérez, finishing fourth at the rain-affected German Grand Prix. In 2020, Stroll achieved his maiden pole position at the Turkish Grand Prix, with podiums at the Italian and Sakhir Grands Prix. Stroll remained at the re-branded Aston Martin in 2021, partnered by Sebastian Vettel for two seasons. Stroll has been teammates with Fernando Alonso since 2023, finishing a career-best tenth in the World Drivers' Championship that year.

As of the 2026 São Paulo Grand Prix, Stroll has achieved one pole position and three podiums in Formula One. Stroll is contracted to remain at Aston Martin until at least the end of the 2027 season. Outside of Formula One, Stroll competed in two editions of the 24 Hours of Daytona in 2016 and 2018 with CGR and Jackie Chan DC, respectively.

== Early and personal life ==
Lance Jacob Strulovitch was born on 29 October 1998 in Montreal. Stroll is the son of Canadian billionaire businessman Lawrence Stroll—part-owner and executive chairman of Aston Martin, as well as owner of its Formula One team—and Belgian fashion designer Claire-Anne Stroll (née Callens), and has an older sister named Chloe. His parents are divorced and his father has since remarried to Raquel Diniz. He is of Russian Jewish descent from his father's side. Stroll races under the Canadian flag and holds both Canadian and Belgian citizenship. He is multilingual, speaking English, French, Dutch, and Italian.

== Junior racing career ==
Like many racing drivers, Stroll began his motorsport career in karting at the age of ten. He recorded numerous race and championship wins in his native Canada and North America and in 2008, his first year of karting, he won the Federation de Sport Automobile du Quebec rookie of the year award and driver of the year in 2009. He was mentored by six-time World Champion Mike Wilson. In 2010, Stroll became a member of the Ferrari Driver Academy.

=== Formula 4 ===
Stroll's car racing debut came in the 2014 Florida Winter Series, a non-championship series organized by the Ferrari Driver Academy. He raced against future Formula One competitors Nicholas Latifi and Max Verstappen, and took two podium finishes as well as pole position at Homestead–Miami Speedway.

Stroll made his competitive car racing debut in the 2014 Italian F4 Championship, driving for Prema Powerteam. Despite missing the final round due to injury, Stroll emerged as series champion, taking seven race wins, thirteen podium finishes, and five pole positions.

=== Formula Three ===
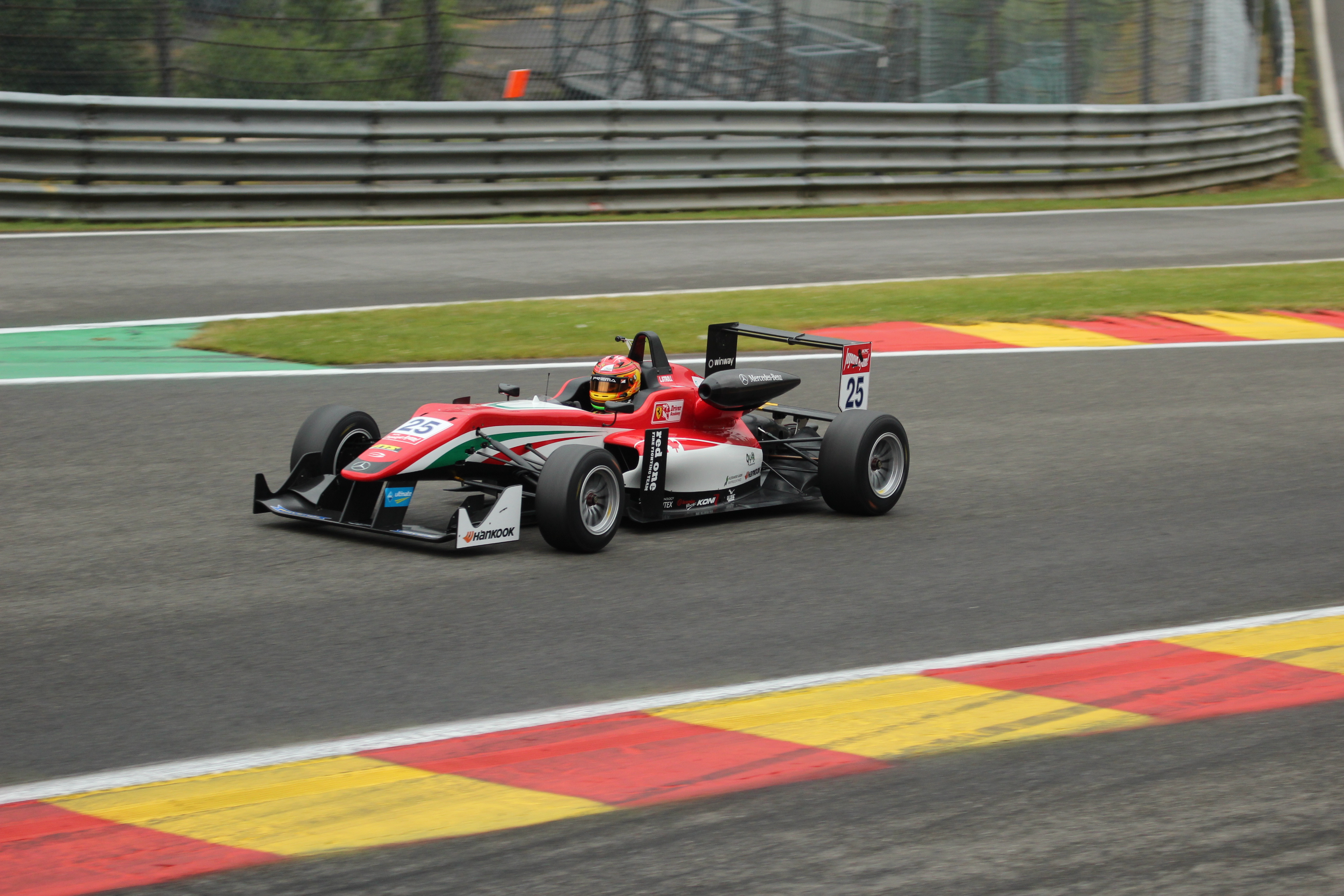
Stroll competing in Formula Three, 2015

==== 2015 ====
At the beginning of 2015, Stroll won the New Zealand-based Toyota Racing series, recording ten podiums – including four wins – from sixteen race starts. In the same year, he also contested the FIA Formula 3 European Championship with Prema Powerteam, in which his father by this time had taken a stake. He competed against future Formula One competitors Antonio Giovinazzi, Charles Leclerc, George Russell and Alexander Albon, winning one race at the Hockenheimring and achieving six total podium finishes in the 33-race series. He ended the season fifth in the championship. 2015 also marked Stroll's first and only appearance at the non-championship Formula Three Macau Grand Prix, in which he finished in eighth place.

On 11 November 2015, it was announced that Stroll would leave the Ferrari Driver Academy to serve as a test driver for Williams.

==== 2016 ====
Stroll began 2016 by finishing 5th at the 2016 24 Hours of Daytona, driving for Ford Chip Ganassi Racing in a Ford EcoBoost Prototype. He remained with Prema Powerteam for a third consecutive year to compete in his second season of the Formula 3 European Championship. Prior to the season, his father Lawrence hired Ferrari chief track engineer Luca Baldisserri to be Stroll's race engineer. He won the first race at Circuit Paul Ricard before taking a record thirteen more race victories over the season, including five consecutive victories in the final five races. He claimed the title with four races to go and ended the season a record 187 points clear of nearest competitor Maximilian Günther.

Throughout the season, Stroll and his team were accused of manufacturing his title via team orders to his teammates. This was highlighted by George Russell at Paul Ricard, who claimed that "it's not a fair fight" in the wake of Stroll inheriting the lead from a slowing Nick Cassidy.

== Formula One career ==
=== Williams (2017–2018) ===
==== 2017 ====
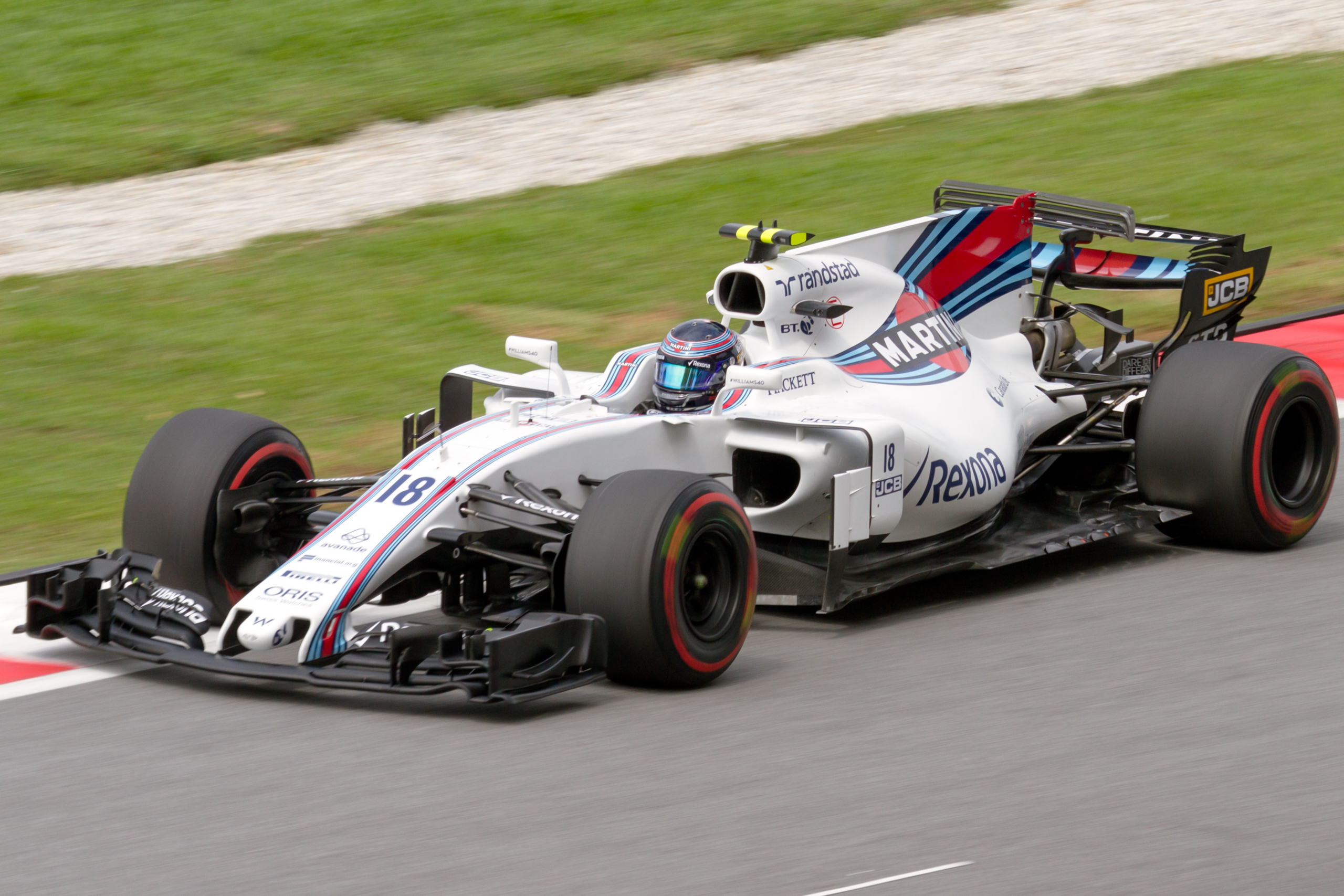
Stroll driving the Williams FW40 at the 2017 Malaysian Grand Prix

Stroll drove for the Williams team for the 2017 Formula One season, partnering Felipe Massa. He became the first Canadian Formula One driver since the 1997 World Drivers' Champion Jacques Villeneuve. Reportedly, Stroll's father Lawrence Stroll paid $80 million to Williams prior to his Formula One debut.

Stroll crashed in practice for his debut race, the Australian Grand Prix, and received a grid penalty as this necessitated an unscheduled gearbox change. He retired from the race with a brake failure. Two more retirements followed after collisions with Sergio Pérez at the Chinese Grand Prix and Carlos Sainz Jr. at the Bahrain Grand Prix. Stroll's first race finish came at the Russian Grand Prix, where he finished in eleventh despite spinning on the first lap. He retired with a brake failure at the Monaco Grand Prix, but was still classified fifteenth. Stroll scored his first Formula One points at his home Grand Prix in Montreal, finishing in ninth place.

At the Azerbaijan Grand Prix, Stroll had run in second place in the closing laps, but was passed by Valtteri Bottas just metres from the finish line. He finished third to become the youngest rookie and the second-youngest driver after Max Verstappen to finish on the podium in Formula One, at the age of 18 years and 239 days. becoming the second-youngest driver to score a podium finish and the youngest to do so during their rookie season.

Stroll registered the fourth fastest time during a wet qualifying session for the Italian Grand Prix. Due to Red Bull drivers Daniel Ricciardo and Max Verstappen (respectively third and second) taking grid penalties, Stroll was promoted to second place on the starting grid, making him the youngest Formula One driver to start on the front row at the age of 18 years and 310 days. Stroll finished seventh in the race. He recorded two eighth-place finishes at the Singapore (where he started eighteenth) and Malaysian Grands Prix. At the latter, Stroll and Sebastian Vettel collided on the cool-down lap after the end of the race. Both drivers blamed the other for the incident, however no action was taken by the stewards.

At the Mexican Grand Prix, Stroll worked his way up to sixth place in the race from eleventh on the grid. Stroll ended the season twelfth in the standings, one place below teammate Massa who had both outqualified and outraced Stroll 17–2 and 9–4 (in races both drivers finished) respectively. Furthermore, Stroll gained more positions on the opening lap than any other driver that year.

==== 2018 ====
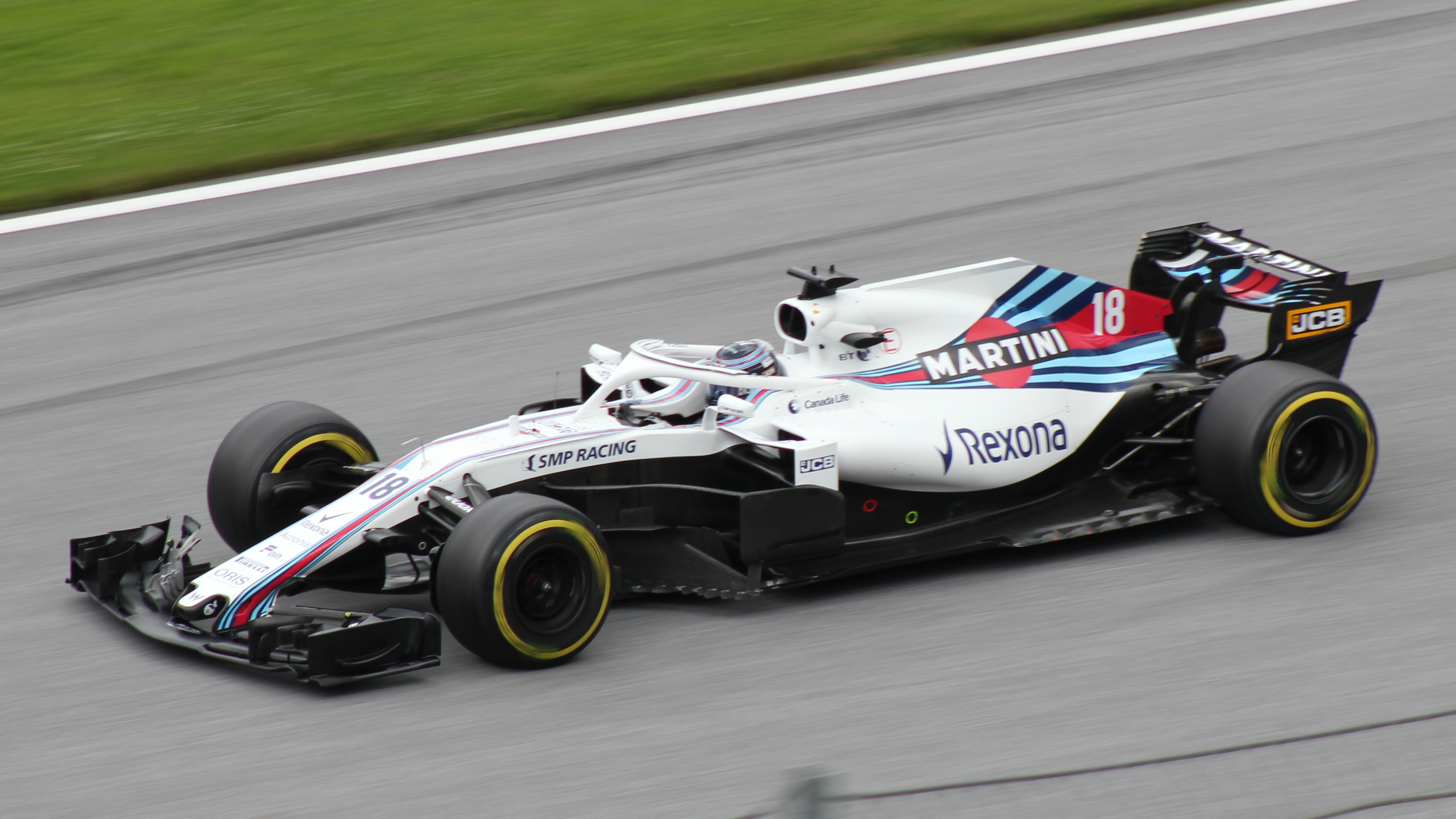
Stroll at the 2018 Austrian Grand Prix

For the 2018 season, Stroll remained with Williams, partnered by Sergey Sirotkin after Massa retired from Formula One. The Williams FW41 was the slowest car of the field and the team finished last in the constructors' championship that season. Stroll scored the team's first points of the year at the Azerbaijan Grand Prix by finishing eighth. Stroll's home race, the Canadian Grand Prix, ended on the first lap after a heavy collision with Brendon Hartley. He then retired from the following French Grand Prix with a tire puncture. His second and final retirement of the year came at the German Grand Prix with a brake failure. Stroll made his only appearance in the third qualifying session (Q3) at the Italian Grand Prix, qualifying tenth. He went on to finish ninth in the race with teammate Sirotkin in tenth, marking Williams' only double points-finish that season.

Stroll finished eighteenth in the Drivers' Championship, scoring six of the team's seven points. Sirotkin out-qualified Stroll at twelve of the twenty-one races.

=== Racing Point (2019–2020) ===
==== 2019 ====
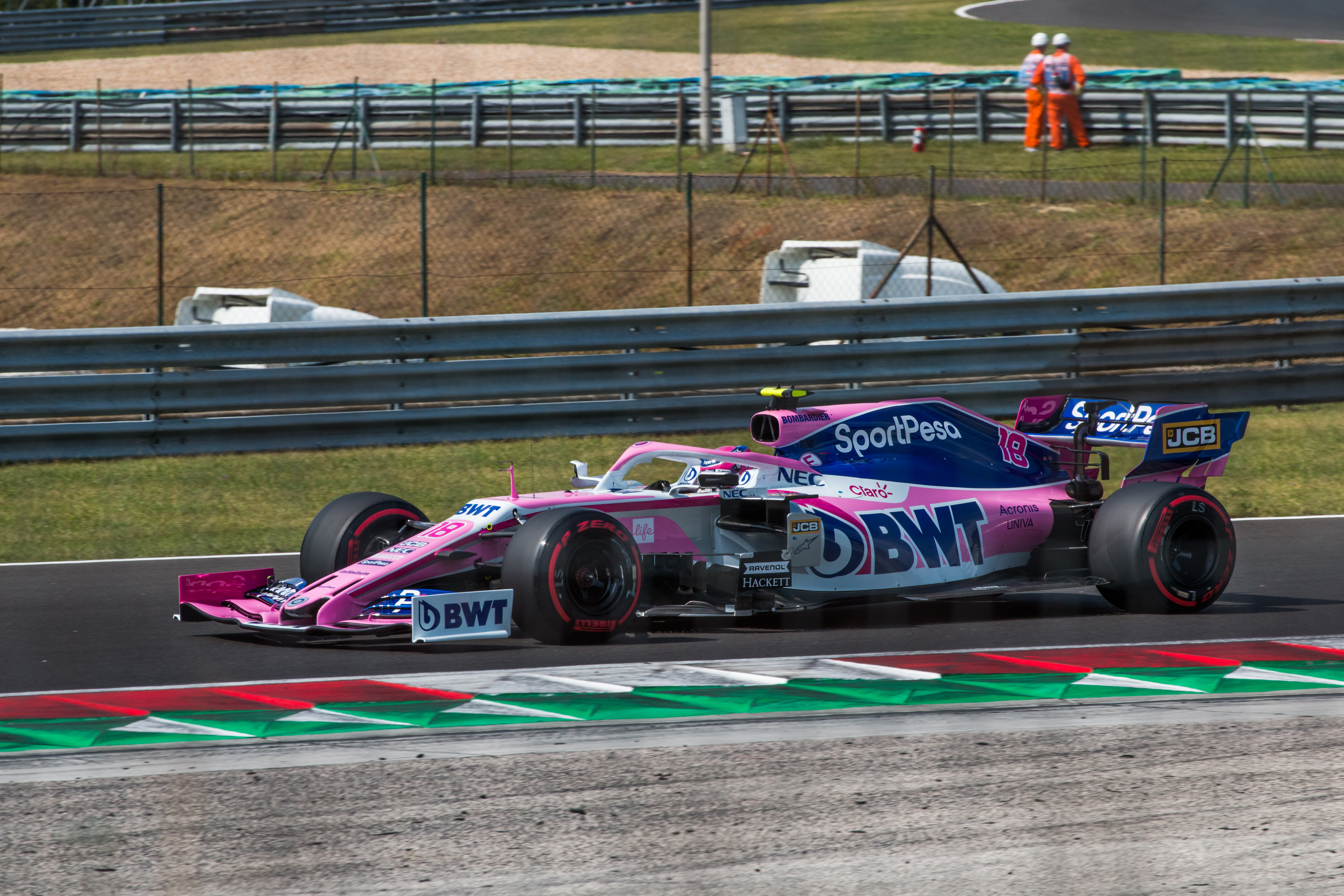
Stroll at the 2019 Hungarian Grand Prix

Stroll switched to driving for the newly renamed Racing Point team for the 2019 season after the team was bought by a consortium of investors led by his father Lawrence. He replaced Esteban Ocon at the team and raced alongside Sergio Pérez. Stroll scored his first points for his new team at the season-opening Australian Grand Prix, finishing ninth. At the Chinese Grand Prix, Stroll criticized team strategy after finishing outside of the point-scoring positions for the second consecutive race. At the Spanish Grand Prix he was involved in a collision with Lando Norris that ended both drivers' races. He finished ninth at the Canadian Grand Prix having started seventeenth.

In qualifying at the German Grand Prix, Stroll progressed past the first qualifying session (Q1), ending a streak of fourteen Grands Prix in which he had been eliminated in Q1. He switched to slick tires late in the race as the track was drying, elevating him to second place. He missed out on a podium after being overtaken by Daniil Kvyat and Sebastian Vettel. Stroll's next points finish came at the Belgian Grand Prix, where he started sixteenth and finished tenth. He scored his final points of the season after finishing ninth at the Japanese Grand Prix. Stroll retired from the final two races of the season, suffering a suspension failure at the Brazilian Grand Prix and brake issues at the Abu Dhabi Grand Prix.

Stroll ended his first season at Racing Point fifteenth in the Drivers' Championship with 21 points, below teammate Pérez's tally of 52 points. He was out-qualified by Pérez at eighteen of the season's twenty-one races.

==== 2020 ====
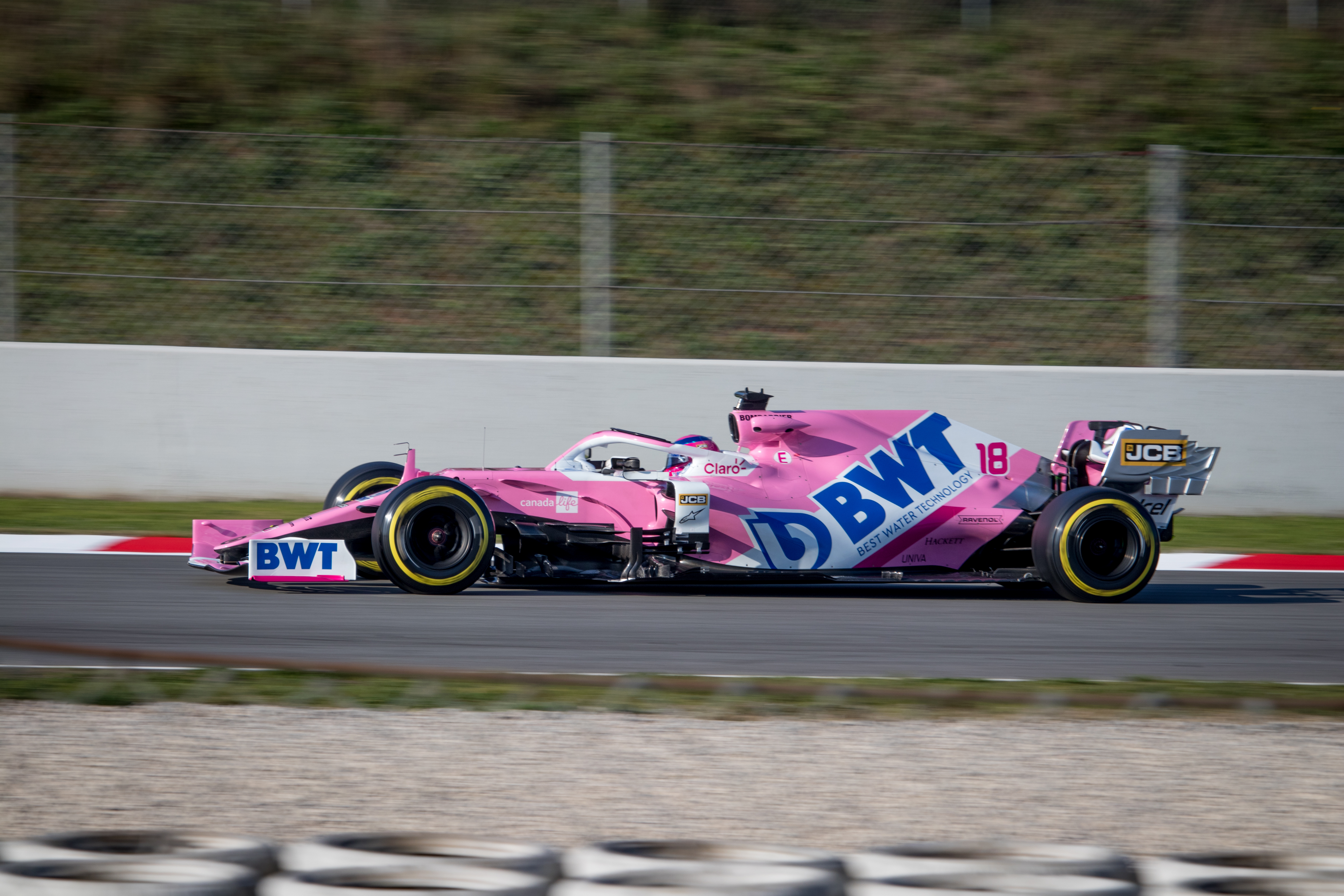
Stroll during pre-season testing in 2020

Stroll and Pérez were retained by Racing Point for 2020. As a result of Canada's national sporting authority resigning its mandate from the FIA, Stroll raced under an American licence but was still recognised as Canadian on race weekends. During the Austrian Grand Prix, he qualified in ninth place but later retired from the race following engine problems. His first points finish of the season came at the Styrian Grand Prix. He finished seventh having overtaken Daniel Ricciardo in a move Ricciardo described as "desperate" and deserving of a penalty. Stroll qualified third and finished fourth at the Hungarian Grand Prix and followed this with four more points finishes including fourth place at the Spanish Grand Prix. Stroll claimed his second Formula One podium at the Italian Grand Prix. He was in second place when the race restarted after a red flag period before being passed by multiple cars including Pierre Gasly. Stroll later suggested that his poor restart cost him the chance to win the race after Gasly claimed victory. After eight races, Stroll was in fourth place in the Drivers' Championship.

A string of retirements followed beginning with the Tuscan Grand Prix, where a mechanical failure caused Stroll to crash heavily, having been running in fourth place. He was eliminated from the Russian Grand Prix on the first lap after contact with Charles Leclerc caused him to hit a wall. He then withdrew from the Eifel Grand Prix prior to qualifying due to illness, having sat out the third practice session. His team confirmed he did not have COVID-19, saying he had passed all necessary FIA tests in this regard. He was replaced at the event by Nico Hülkenberg. Shortly after the race, Stroll tested positive for COVID-19. He completed a 10-day isolation period and returned to racing at the Portuguese Grand Prix, in which he collided with Lando Norris. This caused Stroll's eventual retirement from the race, his fourth consecutive non-finish.

Stroll took his first pole position at the Turkish Grand Prix after a wet qualifying session. In doing so, he became the first Canadian F1 driver to take pole position since Jacques Villeneuve at the 1997 European Grand Prix. Stroll led the race for 32 of the 58 laps, but reported severe tire graining and eventually fell to ninth place by the end of the race. After the race, Racing Point found damage on Stroll's front wing which they named as the cause of his tire issues. Shortly after the Bahrain Grand Prix was restarted following Romain Grosjean's accident, Stroll's car was flipped over after making contact with Daniil Kvyat at turn eight. Stroll was uninjured and was able to extract himself from the car. At the Sakhir Grand Prix, he benefited from tire issues for the leading Mercedes cars to finish third, earning his third podium in Formula One.

At the end of the season, Stroll stood eleventh in the Drivers' Championship, scoring 75 of the team's 210 points. (Note: Racing Point drivers scored a total of 210 points, however the team was deducted 15 points in the Constructors' Championship due to a ruling on the legality of their car, leaving the team on 195 points. This deduction did not affect points earned in the Drivers' Championship.)

=== Aston Martin (2021–present) ===
==== 2021 ====
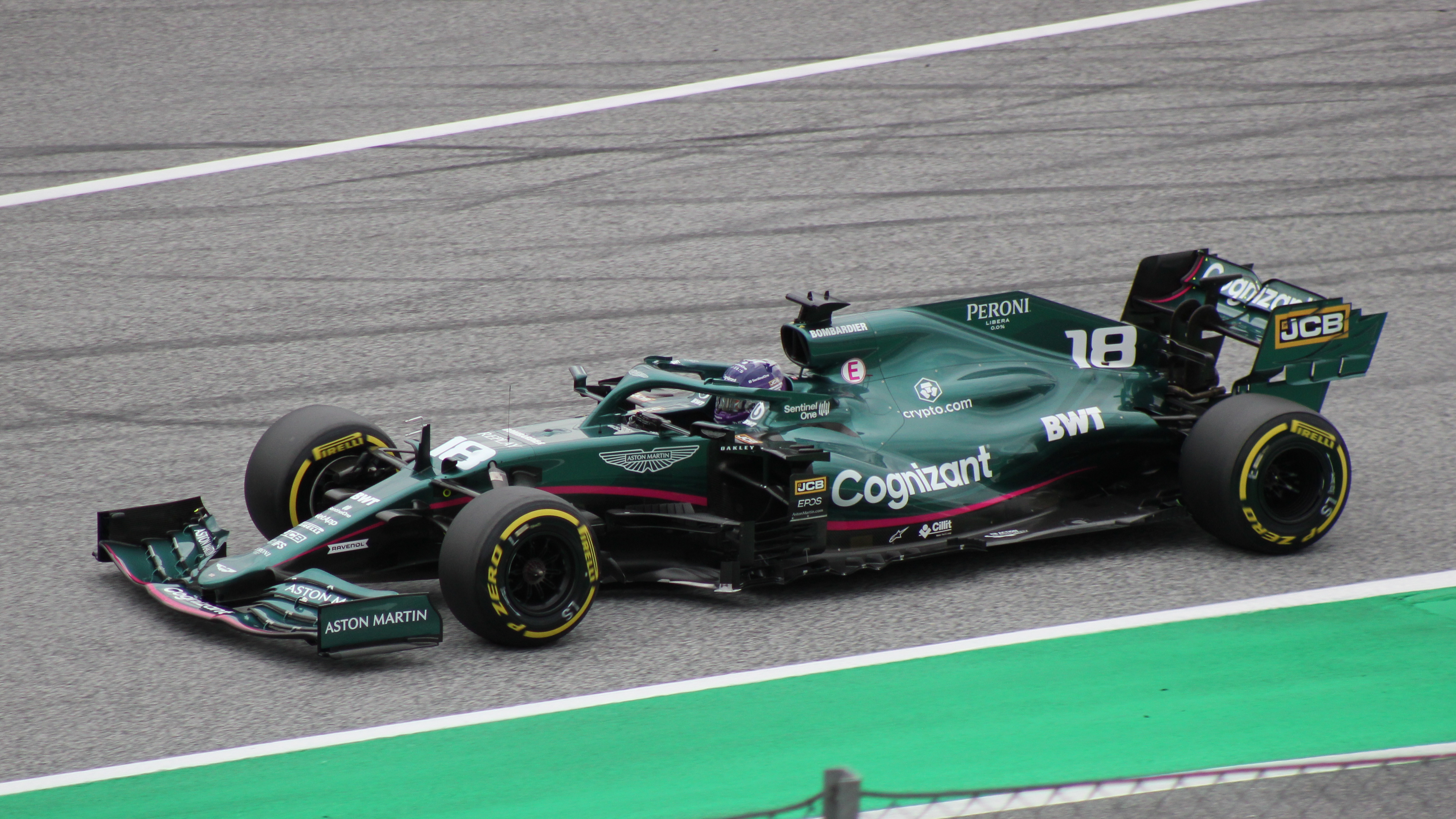
Stroll at the 2021 Austrian Grand Prix

Stroll continued to drive for the Racing Point team in 2021 as the team rebranded to Aston Martin. He was partnered by Sebastian Vettel in place of Pérez. Stroll qualified and finished tenth in the season-opening Bahrain Grand Prix. A video of him driving over a curb at the Monaco Grand Prix became a popular internet meme, used as a bait-and-switch similar to rickrolling, after the official broadcast interrupted a battle between Vettel, Pierre Gasly and Lewis Hamilton to show a replay of Stroll driving over the curbs. A high-speed tire failure at the Azerbaijan Grand Prix ended Stroll's race. A similar incident then happened to Max Verstappen later in the race, prompting tire manufacturer Pirelli to conduct an investigation into the failures. Stroll scored a point with tenth place at the French Grand Prix, having started nineteenth after being unable to set a representative lap time in qualifying.

Stroll caused a collision on the first lap of the Hungarian Grand Prix that eliminated himself and Charles Leclerc from the race and caused Daniel Ricciardo significant damage. As a result, Stroll was issued a five-place grid penalty for the next race, the Belgian Grand Prix. He finished seventh at the Italian Grand Prix, his best finish of the season thus far, but collided with both Vettel and Pierre Gasly at the Russian Grand Prix, for which he received a ten-second penalty. He crashed in qualifying at the Mexico City Grand Prix and finished fourteenth. His best result of the season came at the Qatar Grand Prix with a sixth-place finish. Stroll ended the season thirteenth in the Drivers' Championship, scoring 34 points to Vettel's 43.

==== 2022 ====
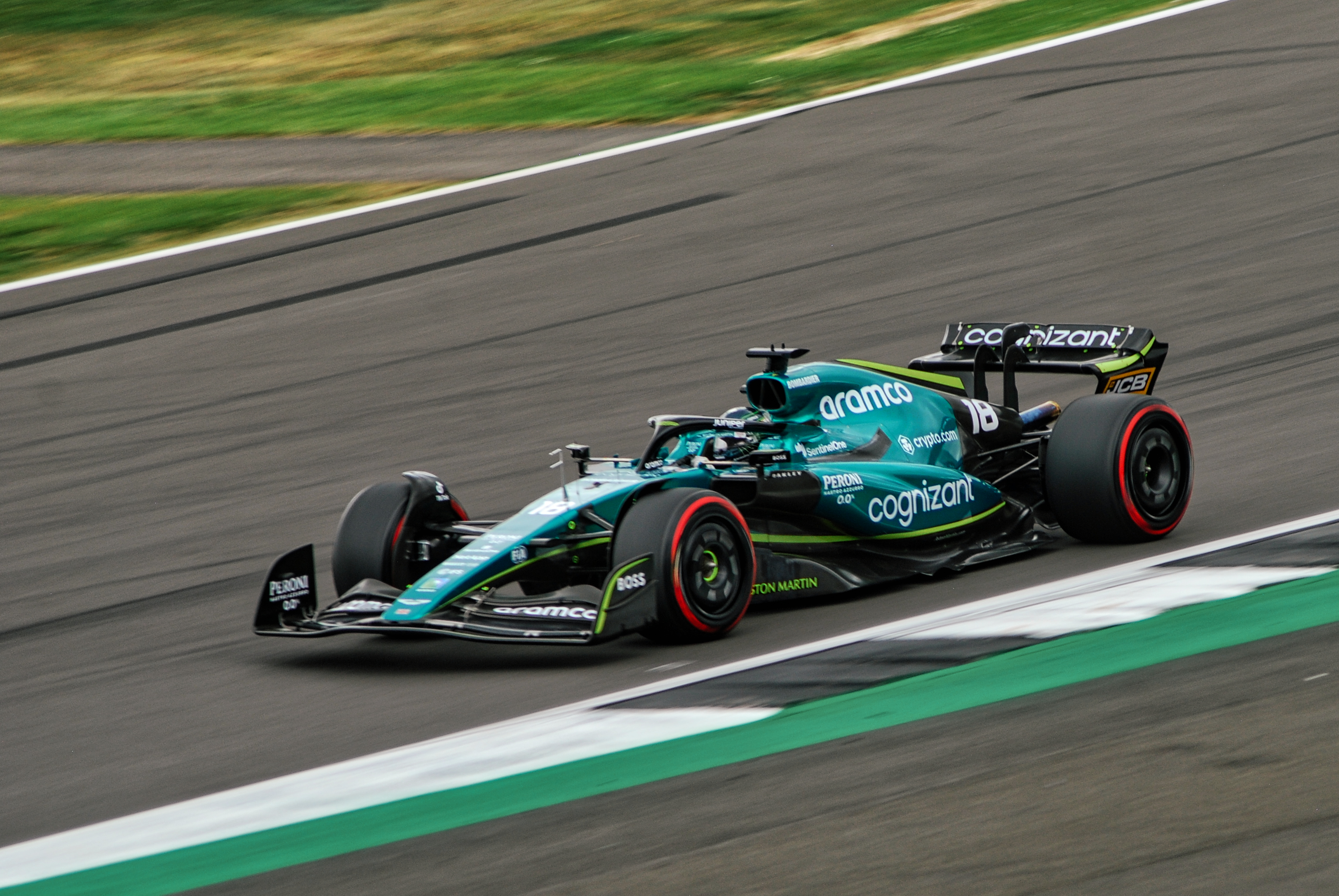
Stroll at the 2022 British Grand Prix

Aston Martin retained Stroll and Vettel for the 2022 season. Stroll was in eleventh place in the closing laps of the Saudi Arabian Grand Prix, but lost places after a collision with Alex Albon. He failed to set a qualifying time at the Australian Grand Prix due to a crash with Nicholas Latifi for which Stroll was penalised. He made three pit stops during the race and later received a penalty for weaving on the straight when defending against Valtteri Bottas, finishing twelfth. Stroll took his first points of the year with tenth at the Emilia Romagna Grand Prix, and followed it up with another tenth-place finish in Miami, despite a collision with Kevin Magnussen. He crashed in qualifying at the Azerbaijan Grand Prix and retired from the race with mechanical issues.

More tenth-place finishes came at the Canadian, French and Dutch Grands Prix. Stroll came close to points at the British Grand Prix, where he started twentieth and finished eleventh, and at the Hungarian Grand Prix, where he was running eighth before being spun around by Daniel Ricciardo. Stroll's best result of the season came with sixth place at the Singapore Grand Prix, and he achieved his best grid position since his 2020 Turkish Grand Prix pole position at the United States Grand Prix, starting fifth. He ran as high as third in the opening laps but was eliminated in a high-speed collision with Fernando Alonso. A penalty for dangerous defending against teammate Vettel in the São Paulo Grand Prix sprint dropped Stroll to fifteenth on the grid for the race, in which he recovered to score a point in tenth place. He scored more points at the Abu Dhabi Grand Prix, starting fourteenth and finishing eighth. Stroll ended the season fifteenth in the Drivers' Championship with 18 points to Vettel's 37.

==== 2023 ====
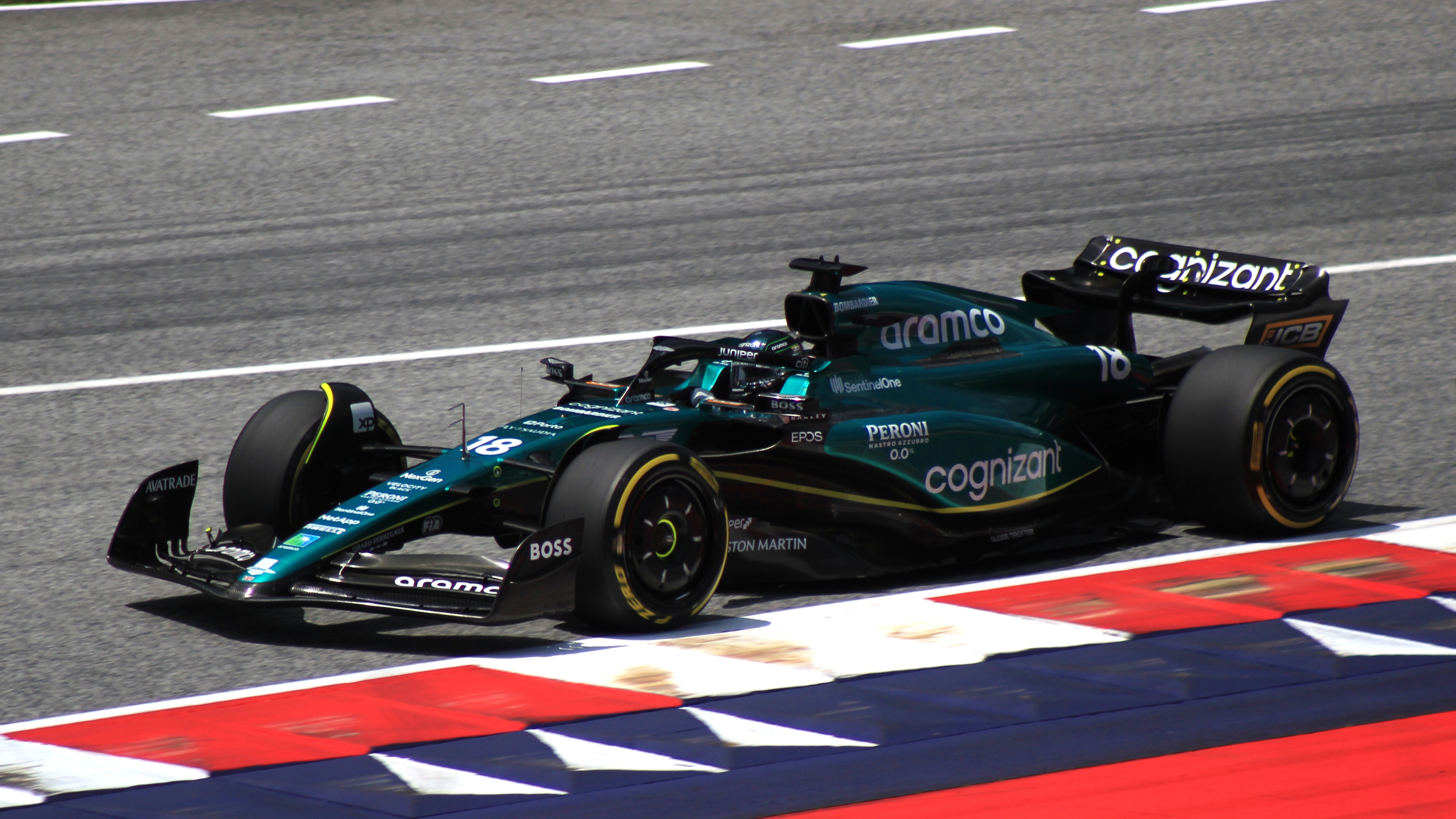
Stroll at the 2023 Austrian Grand Prix

Stroll remained with Aston Martin for 2023, partnered with Fernando Alonso who replaced the retiring Vettel. Stroll missed all three days of pre-season testing at Bahrain International Circuit after suffering a cycling accident while training. He sustained multiple injuries in the accident including fractures in both wrists and a broken toe. Minor surgery was performed on his right wrist with metal screws being inserted. He was replaced by reserve driver Felipe Drugovich for the test, but returned for the season-opening Bahrain Grand Prix. In the second free practice session, he reported lingering pain from his wrists that forced him to adopt a relaxed style of driving; he said that while he felt "rather stiff", he "felt alright" in the car. Stroll qualified eighth for the race and finished sixth despite a first-lap collision with teammate Alonso. He started fifth at the Saudi Arabian Grand Prix but retired from the race with engine issues. He finished fourth at the Australian Grand Prix, his best result of the year, despite first-lap contact with Charles Leclerc and later running into the gravel at the second restart.

Stroll scored points in the sprint and main race at the Azerbaijan Grand Prix, but failed to score at the Miami Grand Prix after being eliminated in Q1. Damage from an accident caused his retirement from the following Monaco Grand Prix. He scored points at the next three races, including finishing ninth from sixteenth at the start in the Canadian Grand Prix, and fourth place at the Austrian Grand Prix sprint. He finished eleventh at the British Grand Prix but was demoted by a penalty for colliding with Pierre Gasly. He scored points at the Hungarian and Belgian Grands Prix, despite crashing in the sprint shootout at the latter. He finished outside the top ten at the Dutch and Italian Grands Prix; his practice running at Monza was curtailed by a fuel system failure and he then qualified in last place. A heavy crash in qualifying at the Singapore Grand Prix caused his withdrawal from the weekend, with Aston Martin team principal Mike Krack stating that Stroll was "still feeling the after-effects" of the accident.

After qualifying seventeenth at the Qatar Grand Prix, 1.1 seconds behind teammate Alonso's time, Stroll appeared to push his personal trainer in frustration as he exited the vehicle. He finished ninth in the race but was demoted outside the points positions with a track limits penalty. He started from the pit lane at the United States Grand Prix but recovered to finish the race ninth; he was later promoted to seventh after the disqualifications of Lewis Hamilton and Charles Leclerc and scored his first points in six races. Stroll started from the pit lane again at the Mexico City Grand Prix and retired with damage from a collision with Valtteri Bottas. He achieved his best qualifying result since 2020 at the São Paulo Grand Prix with third place, ahead of Alonso, and finished fifth. He gained nine places from his starting position at the Las Vegas Grand Prix to again finish fifth. Stroll ended the season tenth in the Drivers' Championship, the highest ranking in his Formula One career. He scored 74 points to Alonso's 206 and was outqualified by Alonso at nineteen of the season's twenty-two races. Team principal Krack defended Stroll's performance relative to Alonso, stating that despite the points difference, "there [was] not a marked gap in performance" between the two and confirmed that Stroll would remain with the team alongside Alonso for 2024.

==== 2024 ====
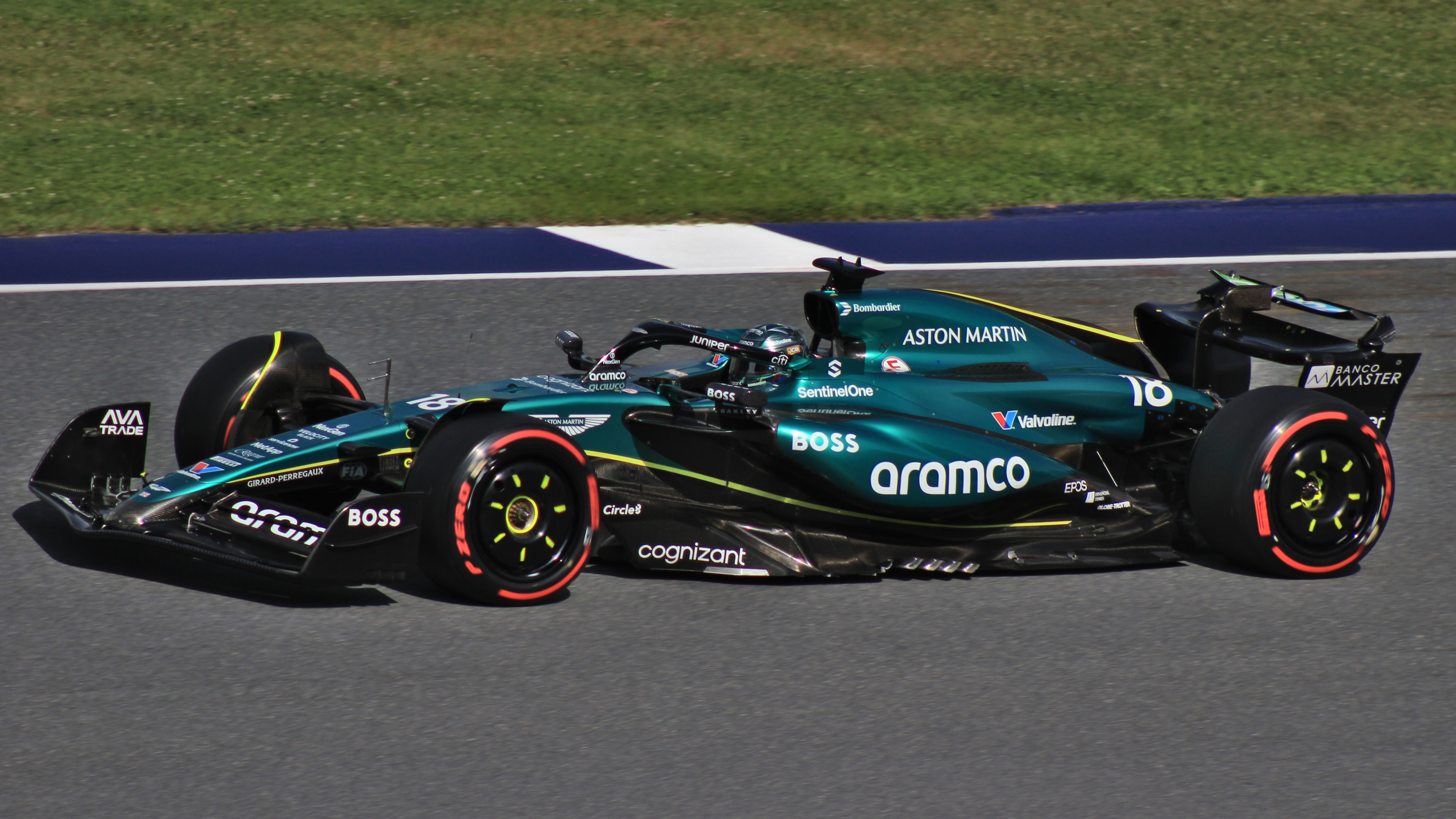
Stroll at the 2024 Austrian Grand Prix

Stroll started the 2024 season with a tenth-place finish at the Bahrain Grand Prix. He then qualified tenth at the Saudi Arabian Grand Prix, but crashed out on lap 7 after hitting the wall at turn 23. He bounced back in Australia, qualifying ninth and finishing sixth. Following the weekend, it was announced that Stroll's race engineer Ben Michell would be replaced by Andrew Vizard.

For the first sprint weekend of the season in China, Stroll qualified 15th for the sprint and finished the shorter race 14th. He then qualified 11th for the main race, but the main race was a disaster as Stroll finished 15th after being given a 10-second penalty for crashing into the back of Daniel Ricciardo on lap 26 following a safety car restart. After the race Ricciardo was furious with Stroll saying "I watched his onboard and he's not even looking at me, he's look at the apex, I don't know why he's not looking at the car in front."

Stroll then qualified 7th for the sprint in Miami but retired on lap 1 due to teammate Alonso sliding into him after a collision between his teammate and Lewis Hamilton. He qualified 11th for the main race but finished 17th after a penalty for leaving the track and gaining an advantage. Stroll then qualified 13th at the Emilia Romagna Grand Prix but finished in 9th scoring his first points since Australia.

Stroll then qualified 13th for the Monaco Grand Prix but finished 14th after throwing his chance for points away when he got a puncture after hitting the wall in the middle of the race. Stroll bounced back with a seventh-place finish at his home race in Canada, and achieved further points in Britain and Hungary. However, this would end up being Stroll's last points result of the season, one which he finished 13th overall. Of note was an error-strewn weekend in Brazil, where Stroll crashed during the qualifying session, lost his car under braking on the formation lap, and beached his car in the gravel while trying to recover back to the track.

==== 2025 ====
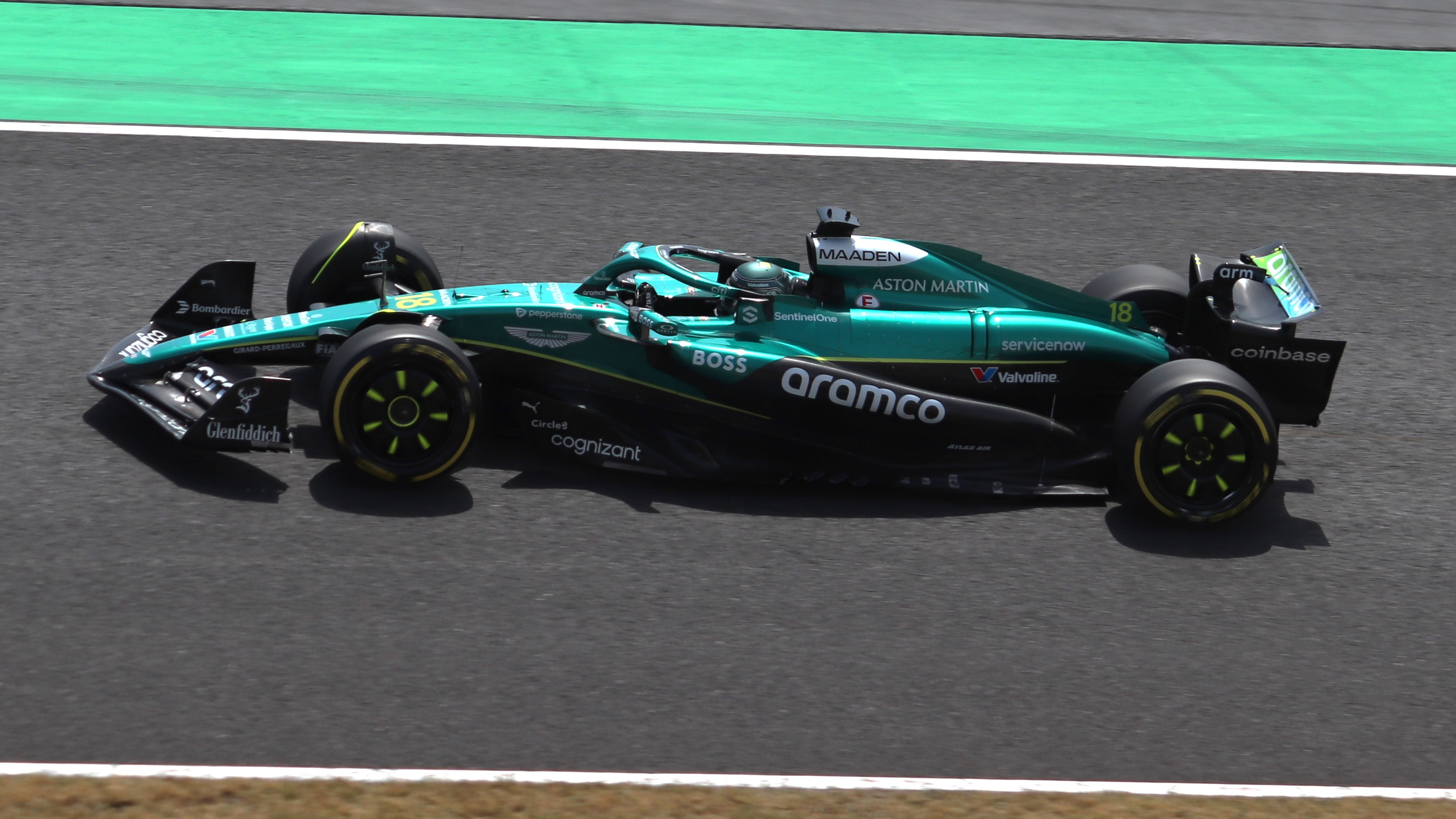
Stroll (pictured at the Japanese Grand Prix) retained his seat for 2025.

Stroll retained his seat in 2025, finishing sixth at the rain-affected Australian Grand Prix. He then finished ninth in China after disqualifications for Charles Leclerc, Lewis Hamilton, and Pierre Gasly. He qualified and finished last at the Japanese Grand Prix, before finishing seventeenth in Bahrain and sixteenth in Saudi Arabia.

After qualifying 14th in Spain, Stroll withdrew from the Grand Prix prior to the race due to a hand injury. In an official team statement, it was announced that he had been experiencing pain in his hand and wrist for the prior six weeks, "which his medical consultant believes is in relation to the procedure he underwent in 2023".

==== 2026 ====
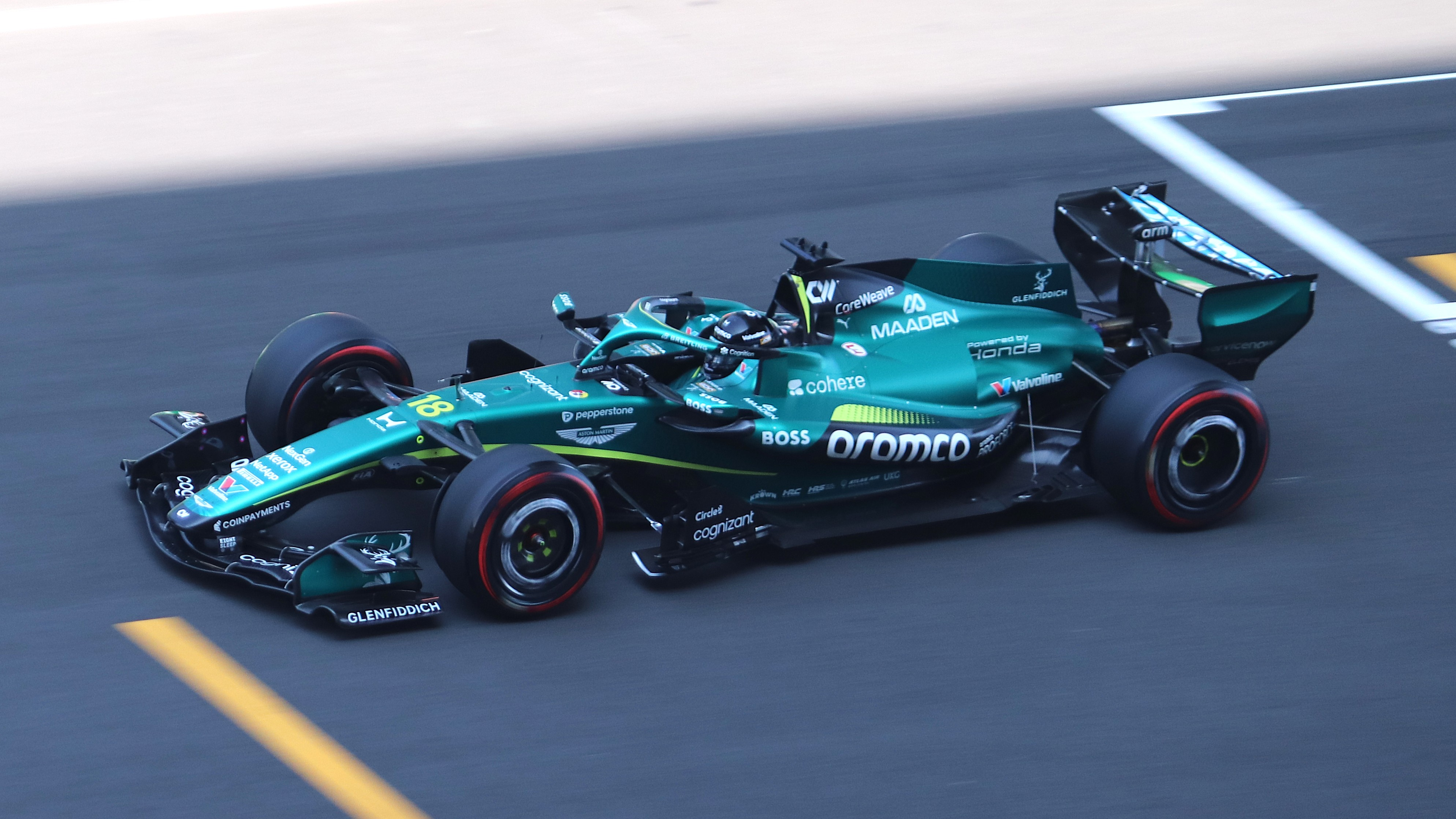
Stroll pictured at the 2026 Chinese Grand Prix during Free Practice

Stroll retained his seat with Aston Martin in 2026, continuing his teammate partnership with Fernando Alonso for the 4th consecutive season running.

== Other racing ==
Stroll competed in two editions of the 24 Hours of Daytona in 2016 and 2018 with CGR and Jackie Chan DC, respectively.

In April 2026, it was announced that Stroll would be taking part in the first round of the 2026 GT World Challenge Europe Endurance Cup with Comtoyou Racing, alongside Roberto Merhi and Mari Boya.

== Karting record ==
=== Karting career summary ===
Season	Series	Team	Position
2008	Coupe de Quebec — Micro Max		1st
2008	Coupe de Montreal — Micro Max		1st
2008	Canadian National Karting Championships — Rotax Micro Max		1st
2009	Coupe de Montreal — Mini Max		1st
2009	Coupe de Quebec — Mini Max		1st
2009	Canadian National Karting Championships — Rotax Mini Max		2nd
2009	ROK Cup International Final — Mini ROK	Advance Karting	7th
2009	Florida Winter Tour — Rotax Micro Max	SH Karting	2nd
2010	Florida Winter Tour — Rotax Mini Max		1st
2010	Coupe de Quebec — Rotax Junior		2nd
2010	Canadian National Karting Championships — Rotax Junior		1st
2010	SKUSA SuperNationals — TaG Junior		39th
2011	South Garda Winter Cup — KF3		NC
2011	Trofeo Grifone — KF3		3rd
2011	Italian Championship — KF3		18th
2011	Coppa del Vesuvio — KF3		14th
2011	German Karting Championship — Junior	Chiesa Corse	11th
2011	CIK-FIA European Championship — KF3	Chiesa Corse	NC
2011	WSK Euro Series — KF3	Chiesa Corse	9th
2011	CIK-FIA World Cup — KF3	Chiesa Corse	25th
2011	Bridgestone Cup European Final — KF3	Chiesa Corse	16th
2011	WSK Final Cup — KF3	Chiesa Corse	15th
2011	SKUSA SuperNationals — TaG Junior	Zanardi America	8th
2011	ERDF Masters Kart — Junior		10th
2012	Coupe de Quebec — Rotax Junior		10th
2012	South Garda Winter Cup — KF3	Chiesa Corse	NC
2012	Andrea Margutti Trophy — KF3	Chiesa Corse	2nd
2012	WSK Master Series — KF3	Chiesa Corse	4th
2012	Campeonato de España — KF3	Chiesa Corse	25th
2012	CIK-FIA European Championship — KF3	Chiesa Corse	21st
2012	WSK Euro Series — KF3	Chiesa Corse	12th
2012	CIK-FIA World Cup — KF3	Chiesa Corse	10th
2012	WSK Final Cup — KF3	Chiesa Corse	12th
2012	Trofeo delle Industrie — KF3	Chiesa Corse	NC
2012	SKUSA SuperNationals — TaG Junior	Chiesa Corse	1st
2013	South Garda Winter Cup — KF	Chiesa Corse	22nd
2013	WSK Euro Series — KF	Chiesa Corse	13th
2013	WSK Super Master Series — KF	Chiesa Corse	5th
2013	CIK-FIA European Championship — KF	Chiesa Corse	32nd
2013	CIK-FIA International Super Cup — KF	Chiesa Corse	12th
2013	CIK-FIA World Championship — KF	Chiesa Corse	6th

== Racing record ==
=== Racing career summary ===
Season	Series	Team	Races	Wins	Poles	F/Laps	Podiums	Points	Position
2014	Florida Winter Series	Ferrari Driver Academy	12	0	1	0	2	N/A	N/A
2014	Italian F4 Championship	Prema Powerteam	18	7	5	11	13	331	**1st**
2015	FIA Formula 3 European Championship	Prema Powerteam	32	1	0	0	6	231	5th
2015	Macau Grand Prix	Prema Powerteam	1	0	0	0	0	N/A	8th
2015	Toyota Racing Series	M2 Competition	16	4	0	1	10	906	**1st**
2016	FIA Formula 3 European Championship	Prema Powerteam	30	14	14	13	20	507	**1st**
2016	IMSA SportsCar Championship	Ford Chip Ganassi Racing	1	0	0	0	0	27	27th
2017	Formula One	Williams Martini Racing	20	0	0	0	1	40	12th
2018	Formula One	Williams Martini Racing	21	0	0	0	0	6	18th
2018	IMSA SportsCar Championship	Jackie Chan DCR JOTA	1	0	0	0	0	20	55th
2019	Formula One	SportPesa Racing Point F1 Team	21	0	0	0	0	21	15th
2020	Formula One	BWT Racing Point F1 Team	17	0	1	0	2	75	11th
2021	Formula One	Aston Martin Cognizant F1 Team	22	0	0	0	0	34	13th
2022	Formula One	Aston Martin Aramco Cognizant F1 Team	22	0	0	0	0	18	15th
2023	Formula One	Aston Martin Aramco Cognizant F1 Team	22	0	0	0	0	74	10th
2024	Formula One	Aston Martin Aramco F1 Team	24	0	0	0	0	24	13th
2025	Formula One	Aston Martin Aramco F1 Team	24	0	0	0	0	33	16th
2026	Formula One	Aston Martin Aramco F1 Team	20	0	0	0	0	0*	22nd*
2026	GT World Challenge Europe Endurance Cup	Comtoyou Racing	1	0	0	0	0	0*	NC*

* Season still in progress.

=== Open-wheel racing results ===
==== Complete Italian F4 Championship results ====
(key) (Races in bold indicate pole position) (Races in italics indicate fastest lap)

Year	Entrant	1	2	3	4	5	6	7	8	9	10	11	12	13	14	15	16	17	18	19	20	21	DC	Points
2014	Prema Powerteam	**ADR**; **1**; 1	ADR; 2; 2	**ADR**; **3**; 7	**IMO1**; **1**; 1	IMO1; 2; 2	**IMO1**; **3**; 1	MUG; 1; 2	MUG; 2; 1	MUG; 3; 6	**MAG**; **1**; 1	MAG; 2 Ret	MAG; 3; 2	VLL; 1; 2	VLL; 2; 1	VLL; 3; 1	MNZ; 1; 4	MNZ; 2; 3	MNZ; 3 Ret	IMO2; 1 WD	IMO2; 2 WD	IMO2; 3 WD	1st	331

==== Complete Toyota Racing Series results ====
(key) (Races in bold indicate pole position) (Races in italics indicate fastest lap)

Year	Team	1	2	3	4	5	6	7	8	9	10	11	12	13	14	15	16	DC	Points
2015	M2 Competition	RUA; 1; 1	RUA; 2; 4	RUA; 3; 1	TER; 1; 1	TER; 2; 3	TER; 3; 3	HMP; 1 Ret	HMP; 2; 5	HMP; 3; 2	TAU; 1; 3	TAU; 2; 4	TAU; 3; 2	TAU; 4; 11	MAN; 1; 6	MAN; 2; 3	MAN; 3; 1	1st	906

==== Complete FIA Formula 3 European Championship results ====
(key) (Races in bold indicate pole position) (Races in italics indicate fastest lap)

Year	Entrant	Engine	1	2	3	4	5	6	7	8	9	10	11	12	13	14	15	16	17	18	19	20	21	22	23	24	25	26	27	28	29	30	31	32	33	DC	Points
2015	Prema Powerteam	Mercedes	SIL; 1; 6	SIL; 2; 4	SIL; 3 Ret	HOC; 1; 6	HOC; 2; 14	HOC; 3; 6	PAU; 1; 9	PAU; 2; 10	PAU; 3; 4	MNZ; 1; 11	MNZ; 2 Ret	MNZ; 3 DSQ	SPA; 1; 31	SPA; 2 Ret	SPA; 3 EX	NOR; 1; 8	NOR; 2; 4	NOR; 3; 26	ZAN; 1; 4	ZAN; 2 Ret	ZAN; 3; 5	RBR; 1; 4	RBR; 2; 3	RBR; 3; 5	ALG; 1; 4	ALG; 2; 3	ALG; 3; 3	NÜR; 1; 9	NÜR; 2; 3	NÜR; 3; 2	HOC; 1; 1	HOC; 2; 6	HOC; 3 Ret	5th	231
2016	Prema Powerteam	Mercedes	**LEC**; **1**; 1	LEC; 2 Ret	LEC; 3; 5	HUN; 1; 4	HUN; 2; 8	HUN; 3; 3	**PAU**; **1**; 9	PAU; 2; 4	PAU; 3; 2	RBR; 1; 2	**RBR**; **2**; 1	**RBR**; **3**; 1	**NOR**; **1**; 1	NOR; 2; 2	**NOR**; **3**; 1	ZAN; 1; 1	ZAN; 2 Ret	ZAN; 3 Ret	**SPA**; **1**; 1	SPA; 2 Ret	SPA; 3; 4	**NÜR**; **1**; 1	**NÜR**; **2**; 1	NÜR; 3; 2	**IMO**; **1**; 2	**IMO**; **2**; 1	**IMO**; **3**; 1	**HOC**; **1**; 1	**HOC**; **2**; 1	HOC; 3; 1				1st	507

==== Complete Macau Grand Prix results ====
Year	Team	Car	Qualifying	Quali Race	Main race
2015	(Italy) Prema Powerteam	Dallara F312	10th	13th	8th

==== Complete Formula One results ====
(key) (Races in bold indicate pole position; races in italics indicate fastest lap)

Year	Entrant	Chassis	Engine	1	2	3	4	5	6	7	8	9	10	11	12	13	14	15	16	17	18	19	20	21	22	23	24	WDC	Points
2017	Williams Martini Racing	Williams FW40	Mercedes M08 EQ Power+ 1.6 V6 t	AUS; Ret	CHN; Ret	BHR; Ret	RUS; 11	ESP; 16	MON; 15^{†}	CAN; 9	AZE; 3	AUT; 10	GBR; 16	HUN; 14	BEL; 11	ITA; 7	SIN; 8	MAL; 8	JPN; Ret	USA; 11	MEX; 6	BRA; 16	ABU; 18					12th	40
2018	Williams Martini Racing	Williams FW41	Mercedes M09 EQ Power+ 1.6 V6 t	AUS; 14	BHR; 14	CHN; 14	AZE; 8	ESP; 11	MON; 17	CAN; Ret	FRA; 17^{†}	AUT; 14	GBR; 12	GER; Ret	HUN; 17	BEL; 13	ITA; 9	SIN; 14	RUS; 15	JPN; 17	USA; 14	MEX; 12	BRA; 18	ABU; 13				18th	6
2019	SportPesa Racing Point F1 Team	Racing Point RP19	Mercedes M10 EQ Power+ 1.6 V6 t	AUS; 9	BHR; 14	CHN; 12	AZE; 9	ESP; Ret	MON; 16	CAN; 9	FRA; 13	AUT; 14	GBR; 13	GER; 4	HUN; 17	BEL; 10	ITA; 12	SIN; 13	RUS; 11	JPN; 9	MEX; 12	USA; 13	BRA; 19^{†}	ABU; Ret				15th	21
2020	BWT Racing Point F1 Team	Racing Point RP20	Mercedes M11 EQ Performance 1.6 V6 t	AUT; Ret	STY; 7	HUN; 4	GBR; 9	70A; 6	ESP; 4	BEL; 9	ITA; 3	TUS; Ret	RUS; Ret	EIF; WD	POR; Ret	EMI; 13	**TUR**; 9	BHR; Ret	SKH; 3	ABU; 10								11th	75
2021	Aston Martin Cognizant F1 Team	Aston Martin AMR21	Mercedes M12 E Performance 1.6 V6 t	BHR; 10	EMI; 8	POR; 14	ESP; 11	MON; 8	AZE; Ret	FRA; 10	STY; 8	AUT; 13	GBR; 8	HUN; Ret	BEL; 20	NED; 12	ITA; 7	RUS; 11	TUR; 9	USA; 12	MXC; 14	SAP; Ret	QAT; 6	SAU; 11	ABU; 13			13th	34
2022	Aston Martin Aramco Cognizant F1 Team	Aston Martin AMR22	Mercedes M13 E Performance 1.6 V6 t	BHR; 12	SAU; 13	AUS; 12	EMI; 10	MIA; 10	ESP; 15	MON; 14	AZE; 16†	CAN; 10	GBR; 11	AUT; 13	FRA; 10	HUN; 11	BEL; 11	NED; 10	ITA; Ret	SIN; 6	JPN; 12	USA; Ret	MXC; 15	SAP; 10	ABU; 8			15th	18
2023	Aston Martin Aramco Cognizant F1 Team	Aston Martin AMR23	Mercedes M14 E Performance 1.6 V6 t	BHR; 6	SAU; Ret	AUS; 4	AZE; 7^{8}	MIA; 12	MON; Ret	ESP; 6	CAN; 9	AUT; 9^{4}	GBR; 14	HUN; 10	BEL; 9	NED; 11	ITA; 16	SIN; WD	JPN; Ret	QAT; 11	USA; 7	MXC; 17†	SAP; 5	LVG; 5	ABU; 10			10th	74
2024	Aston Martin Aramco F1 Team	Aston Martin AMR24	Mercedes M15 E Performance 1.6 V6 t	BHR; 10	SAU; Ret	AUS; 6	JPN; 12	CHN; 15	MIA; 17	EMI; 9	MON; 14	CAN; 7	ESP; 14	AUT; 13	GBR; 7	HUN; 10	BEL; 11	NED; 13	ITA; 19	AZE; 19†	SIN; 14	USA; 15	MXC; 11	SAP; DNS	LVG; 15	QAT; Ret	ABU; 14	13th	24
2025	Aston Martin Aramco F1 Team	Aston Martin AMR25	Mercedes M16 E Performance 1.6 V6 t	AUS; 6	CHN; 9	JPN; 20	BHR; 17	SAU; 16	MIA; 16^{5}	EMI; 15	MON; 15	ESP; WD	CAN; 17	AUT; 14	GBR; 7	BEL; 14	HUN; 7	NED; 7	ITA; 18	AZE; 17	SIN; 13	USA; 12	MXC; 14	SAP; 16	LVG; Ret	QAT; 17†	ABU; 10	16th	33
2026	Aston Martin Aramco F1 Team	Aston Martin AMR26	Honda RA626H 1.6 V6 t	AUS; NC	CHN; Ret	JPN; Ret	MIA; 17	CAN; 15	MON; Ret	BCN; Ret	AUT; Ret	GBR; 19	BEL; Ret	HUN; 13	NED; Ret	ITA; Ret	ESP; Ret	AZE; Ret	BHR; 12	SIN; Ret	USA; 15	MXC; Ret	SAP; Ret	LVG	QAT	ABU		22nd*	0*

^{†} Did not finish, but was classified as he had completed more than 90% of the race distance.
* Season still in progress.

=== Sports car racing results ===
==== Complete IMSA SportsCar Championship results ====
(key) (Races in bold indicate pole position) (Races in italics indicate fastest lap)

Year	Entrant	Class	Chassis	Engine	1	2	3	4	5	6	7	8	9	10	Rank	Points
2016	Ford Chip Ganassi Racing	P	Ford EcoBoost Riley DP	Ford EcoBoost D35 3.5 L Turbo V6	DAY; 5	SEB	LBH	LGA	DET	WGL	MOS	ELK	COA	PET	27th	27
2018	Jackie Chan DCR JOTA	P	Oreca 07	Gibson GK428 4.2 L V8	DAY; 11	SEB	LBH	MDO	DET	WGL	MOS	ELK	LGA	PET	55th	20

==== 24 Hours of Daytona results ====
Year	Team	Co-drivers	Car	Class	Laps	Pos.	Class pos.
2016	(United States) Ford Chip Ganassi Racing	(Austria) Alexander Wurz; (New Zealand) Brendon Hartley; (United Kingdom) Andy Priaulx	Riley MkXXVI-Ford	P	725	5th	5th
2018	(China) Jackie Chan DCR Jota	(Sweden) Felix Rosenqvist; (Spain) Daniel Juncadella; (Netherlands) Robin Frijns	Oreca 07-Gibson	P	777	15th	11th

==== Complete GT World Challenge Europe results ====
===== GT World Challenge Europe Endurance Cup =====
Year	Team	Car	Class	1	2	3	4	5	6	7	Pos.	Points
2026	Comtoyou Racing	Aston Martin Vantage AMR GT3 Evo	Pro	LEC; 48†	MNZ	SPA; 6H	SPA; 12H	SPA; 24H	NÜR	POR	NC*	0*

^{†} Did not finish, but was classified as he had completed more than 75% of the race distance.
* Season still in progress.

== See also ==
- Formula One drivers from Canada
- List of Formula One polesitters
- List of select Jewish racing drivers

== Sources ==
- "Drivers profile: Lance Stroll: bio". motorsport.com. 29 October 1998. Archived from the original on 8 October 2016.

Sporting positions
Preceded by Inaugural	Italian Formula 4 Champion; 2014	Succeeded by Ralf Aron
Preceded by Andrew Tang	Toyota Racing Series; Champion; 2015	Succeeded by Lando Norris
Preceded by Nick Cassidy	New Zealand Grand Prix; Winner; 2015	Succeeded by Lando Norris
Preceded by Felix Rosenqvist	FIA Formula 3 European; Champion; 2016	Succeeded by Lando Norris
