= Ed Wood (engineer) =

Former Chief Designer of the Williams Formula One team

- Born: 1 March 1968 (age 58)

Peter Edwin "Ed" Wood (born March 1, 1968) is the former Chief Designer for the Williams Formula One team.

== Career ==
In 1987 he became a mechanic working on F1 motorcycles, Superbikes and MotoGP until 1990 when he went on to the TWR Jaguar Group C and Le Mans cars for one year. After picking up his two degrees he became a R&D Engineer for Ferrari till 2000 where he went to Renault F1 as the Senior Development Engineer. In 2003 he became Chief Designer for Prodrive until joining Williams as Chief Designer in March 2006, leaving the team in May 2018. His role was to co-ordinate the design process of the team's car.

== Education ==
Wood attended the University of Manchester between 1991 and 1995, to study for a mechanical engineering degree. Upon achieving this, he then relocated to the University of Oxford to study for a doctorate in engineering science between 1995 and 1998.

== Personal life ==
Wood lives with his wife Wendy and their two children, in Witney, Oxfordshire.
