= Jakob Andreasen (engineer) =

British and Danish engineer

- Born: 1970 or 1971 (age 55–56)
- Citizenship: British, Danish
- Occupation: Engineer
- Employer: United Autosports
- Title: Technical Director

Jakob Andreasen (born 1970/1971) is a British and Danish Formula One and motorsport engineer. He is currently the technical director for United Autosports.

== Career ==
Andreasen studied engineering at Sheffield Hallam University. He began his motorsport career with McLaren Racing in the mid-1990s, working on the group's GT and Le Mans sports car programmes. He joined McLaren's Formula One team in 2001, initially serving as a Test Engineer before moving into the race team as an Assistant Race Engineer to Juan Pablo Montoya and Pedro de la Rosa.

Between 2007 and 2009, Andreasen worked as Assistant Race Engineer to Lewis Hamilton, playing a key role in Hamilton's early Formula One career, including his first World Championship title in 2008. In 2010, he was promoted to Race Engineer for Jenson Button, with whom he secured two race victories, before departing the team midway through the season.

In 2011, he joined Force India F1 Team as Chief Race Engineer, holding the role until the end of the 2013 season and overseeing race engineering operations and performance delivery. He moved to Williams Racing in 2014 as Chief Performance and Operations Engineer, a position he held until 2018, where he was responsible for coordinating performance engineering, race operations and support functions across the Grove-based team.

In 2018, Andreasen transitioned to electric single-seaters, joining DS Penske as chief race engineer, later continuing as a Race Engineer through early 2020. From 2020 to 2022, he worked as a Race Engineer with Toyota Gazoo Racing Europe, supporting the team's endurance racing programmes. In 2022, Andreasen was appointed technical director at United Autosports, overseeing technical operations and engineering direction across the team's racing activities.
