= Singapore Grand Prix =

Formula 1 Grand Prix in Singapore

- Marina Bay Street Circuit

Race information
- Number of times held: 25
- First held: 1966
- Most wins (drivers): (Germany) Sebastian Vettel (5)
- Most wins (constructors): (Italy) Ferrari (Germany) Mercedes (Austria) Red Bull (5)
- Circuit length: 4.927 km (3.061 miles)
- Race length: 305.337 km (189.727 miles)
- Laps: 62

Last race (2026)

Pole position
- (Netherlands) M. Verstappen; Red Bull Racing-Red Bull Ford; 1:31.373

Podium
- 1. (Netherlands) M. Verstappen; Red Bull Racing-Red Bull Ford; 1:42:00.785; 2. (Monaco) C. Leclerc; Ferrari; +7.335; 3. (Italy) K. Antonelli; Mercedes; +24.573

Fastest lap
- (Monaco) Charles Leclerc; Ferrari; 1:35.202

The Singapore Grand Prix (Note: Chinese: 新加坡大奖赛; Malay: Grand Prix Singapura; Tamil: சிங்கப்பூர் கிராண்ட் பிரிக்ஸ்) is a motor racing event which forms part of the Formula One World Championship. The event takes place on the Marina Bay Street Circuit and was the inaugural night race and first street circuit in Asia designed for Formula One races.

The original Singapore Grand Prix was held at Thomson Road from 1966 to 1973, before returning to the calendar in 2008 at Marina Bay. Fernando Alonso won the inaugural Formula One edition of the renewed Grand Prix, driving for the Renault team amid controversial circumstances, when it emerged a year later that his teammate Nelson Piquet Jr. had been ordered to crash on purpose by senior team management to bring out the safety car at a time chosen to benefit Alonso. The race was the 800th Formula One World Championship race since its inception in 1950, and the first ever Formula One race held at night.

Until the 2024 race, Marina Bay had featured at least one safety car in every race edition, with a total of 24 safety car deployments. The Singapore Grand Prix has been considered to be one of the most challenging and unique tracks on the Formula One calendar. Sebastian Vettel has the most wins on the track, with five victories. In 2022, a contract extension was announced to put the race on the Formula One calendar until at least 2028.

== History ==
=== Formula Libre ===
First organised in 1961, the race was initially known as the Orient Year Grand Prix, located at the Thomson Road Grand Prix circuit.

It was renamed to the Singapore Grand Prix in 1966, shortly after Singapore became a sovereign country in 1965. The event was discontinued after 1973 and a variety of reasons have been suggested, including an increase in traffic, the very high danger and unsuitability of the track for racing, the inconvenience of having to close roads for the event and fatal accidents during the 1972 and 1973 races.

== Formula One ==
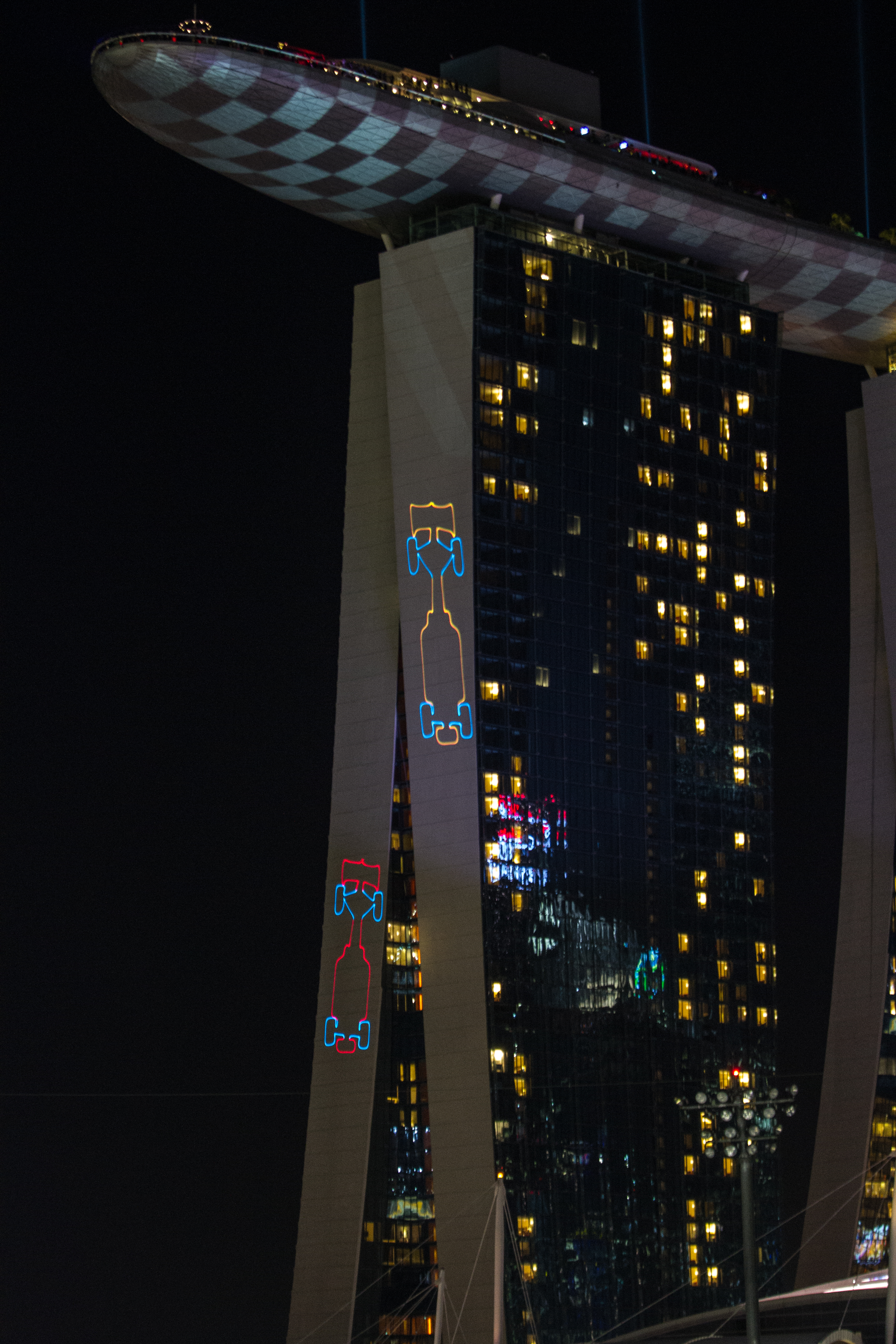
Laser show of Formula One vehicles on the Marina Bay Sands

Announced in 2008, an agreement for a five-year deal was signed by Singapore GP Pte Ltd, the Singapore Tourism Board and Bernie Ecclestone. In November 2007, it was announced that the telecommunications company Singtel would be the title sponsor of the event. The official name of the event became the Formula 1 SingTel Singapore Grand Prix. The race was co-funded by the Government of Singapore, footing 60% of the total bill, or S$90 million, out of a total tab of S$150 million.

Around 110,000 tickets were made available for the country's first Formula One race. Corporate hospitality suites and packages went on sale at the end November 2007, three-day passes to the public went on sale in February 2008. Single-day passes went on sale a month later. The event went on to achieve a full sell-out for all of its tickets. The 2008 race hosted the Amber Lounge after-party and in 2010, Singapore became the second location to host the Amber Lounge Fashion show.

=== 2008 ===
The first race held at the new Marina Bay Street Circuit was the 15th round of the 2008 FIA Formula One World Championship, and was also the first night-time event in Formula One history. The timing of the night event also meant that it could be broadcast live at a convenient time for TV audiences outside of the Asia-Pacific. The track was also illuminated by a series of projectors which adapt their output to match the shape of the course. On track, Felipe Massa was the first man to sit on the Singapore pole in his Ferrari, and dominated the race until he was released early at a pit stop, breaking his fuel rig and dropping him to last place. The race was won by Fernando Alonso driving for the Renault team, though that result has since been tarnished by controversy. Renault were found to have ordered Nelson Piquet Jr. to crash, as the ensuing safety car would strongly benefit Alonso.

- Pole position: Felipe Massa (Ferrari) – 1:44.801 (174.055 km/h)
- Race winner: Fernando Alonso (Renault) – 1:57:16.304 (61 laps)
- Fastest lap: Kimi Räikkönen (Ferrari) – 1:45.599 (172.740 km/h)

=== 2009 ===
For the 2009 race, the circuit was reprofiled slightly, including modifications to turns 1, 2 and 3 to aid overtaking, and also at turn 10 where high kerbs caused many accidents in 2008. McLaren driver and reigning World Champion Lewis Hamilton took pole position and sprinted away to win. Timo Glock finished second for Toyota, and Fernando Alonso was third in the first race for Renault after they received a suspended disqualification from the sport for manipulating the previous year's race.

- Pole position: Lewis Hamilton (McLaren) – 1:47.891 (169.270 km/h)
- Race winner: Lewis Hamilton (McLaren) – 1:56:06.337 (61 laps)
- Fastest lap: Fernando Alonso (Renault) – 1:48.240 (168.725 km/h)

=== 2010 ===
Fernando Alonso became the first man to win twice in Singapore. Now at Ferrari, he took pole and resisted Red Bull's Sebastian Vettel on his way to the 25th victory of his F1 career. Michael Schumacher, making his F1 comeback in 2010, struggled in his Mercedes and was 13th, while Heikki Kovalainen leapt from his burning Lotus T127, borrowed a fire extinguisher and put the fire out himself.

- Pole position: Fernando Alonso (Ferrari) – 1:45.390 (173.287 km/h)
- Race winner: Fernando Alonso (Ferrari) – 1:57:53.579 (61 laps)
- Fastest lap: Fernando Alonso (Ferrari) – 1:47.976 (169.137 km/h)

=== 2011 ===
Sebastian Vettel, an eight-time winner in 2011 before Marina Bay, led the drivers' championship by over 100 points. He won the race from his 11th pole of the season. Vettel, Button, Webber, Alonso and Hamilton filled the top five places. Michael Schumacher again struggled as he slammed into the Sauber of Sergio Pérez.

- Pole position: Sebastian Vettel (Red Bull) – 1:44.381 (174.962 km/h)
- Race winner: Sebastian Vettel (Red Bull) – 1:59:06.757 (61 laps)
- Fastest lap: Jenson Button (McLaren) – 1:48.454 (168.392 km/h)

=== 2012 ===
On 22 September 2012, the AP reported that Bernie Ecclestone and the Singapore Grand Prix had agreed that the Grand Prix would remain on the Formula One calendar until 2017. Lewis Hamilton claimed his fifth pole of the season for McLaren and his second in Singapore. A surprise visitor to the front row alongside him was the Williams of Pastor Maldonado, but it was Sebastian Vettel's Red Bull that inherited the race lead when Hamilton pulled out with gearbox problems. Vettel then dedicated his 23rd Grand Prix win to Sid Watkins, who had died shortly before the race.

- Pole position: Lewis Hamilton (McLaren) – 1:46.362 (171.704 km/h)
- Race winner: Sebastian Vettel (Red Bull) – 2:00:26.144 (59 laps)
- Fastest lap: Nico Hülkenberg (Force India) – 1:51.033 (164.480 km/h)

=== 2013 ===
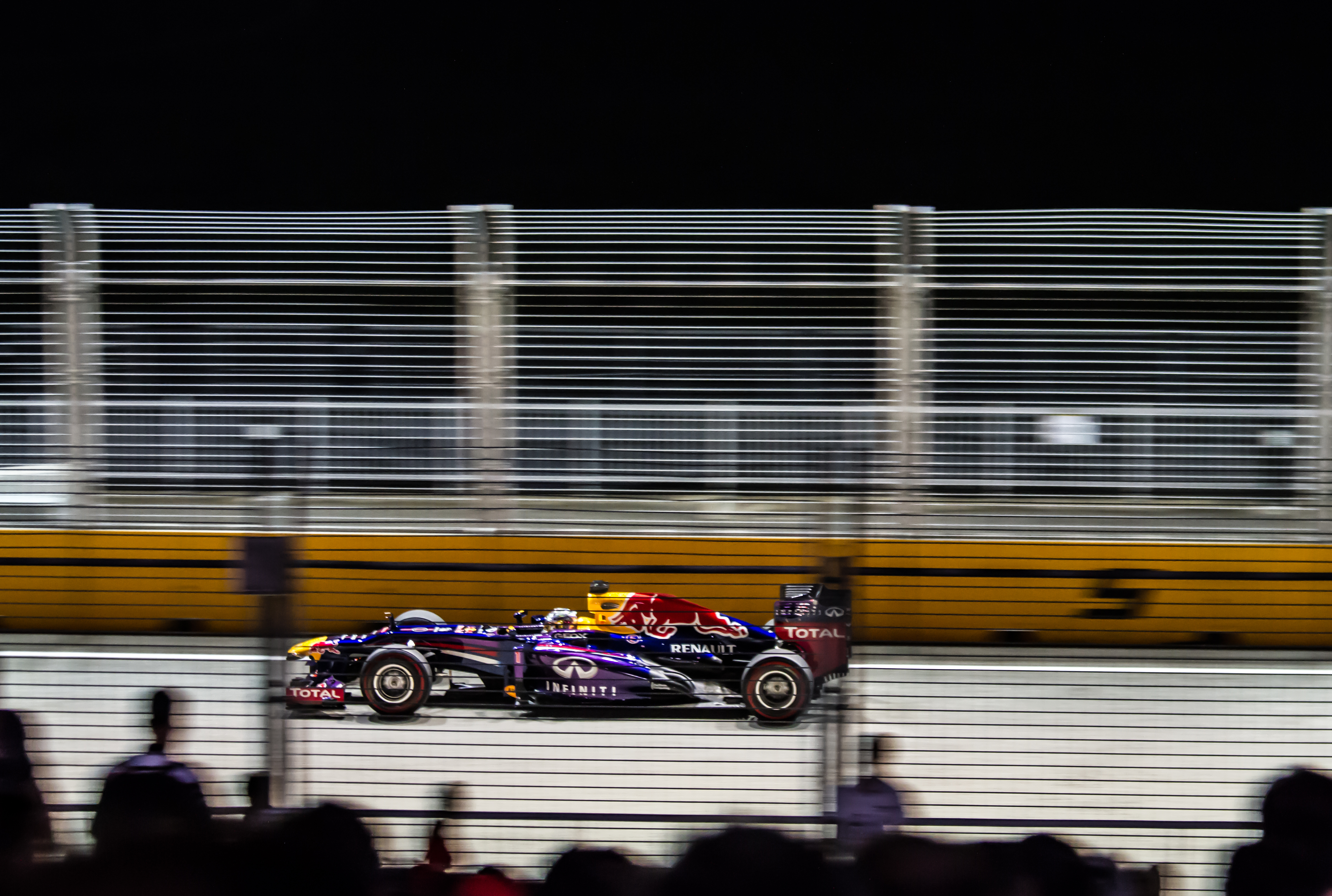
Sebastian Vettel's Red Bull RB9 (2013)

For the 2013 race, it was announced that the 10th turn of the track, the "Singapore Sling" chicane, would be reconfigured so the cars would have to navigate a flowing left-hander before accelerating towards the Anderson Bridge.

Sebastian Vettel took his third successive win in Singapore with Red Bull and the 33rd of his career as a fourth straight title also loomed. He did it from his second Singapore pole, recovering from the surprise of seeing Nico Rosberg's Mercedes briefly ahead at race start to take victory by over half a minute. Fernando Alonso was on the podium yet again before stopping his Ferrari to pick up Mark Webber, whose Red Bull was in flames at Turn 7.

- Pole position: Sebastian Vettel (Red Bull) – 1:42.841 (177.302 km/h)
- Race winner: Sebastian Vettel (Red Bull) – 1:59:13.132 (61 laps)
- Fastest lap: Sebastian Vettel (Red Bull) – 1:48.574 (167.574 km/h)

=== 2014 ===
On 15 April 2014, it was announced that Singapore Airlines would sponsor the Singapore Grand Prix, starting from that year.

F1's new-generation turbo-charged, hybrid-powered cars brought a new look to the track, ending the reign of the 2.4-litre power unit, but a controversial ban on radio communications dominated pre-race proceedings. Mercedes's Lewis Hamilton sailed to his seventh win of the year, becoming Singapore's third multiple winner in the process as teammate Nico Rosberg retired with technical problems. Sebastian Vettel, bound for Ferrari in 2015, finished second ahead of new Red Bull partner Daniel Ricciardo.

- Pole position: Lewis Hamilton (Mercedes) – 1:45.681 (172.538 km/h)
- Race winner: Lewis Hamilton (Mercedes) – 2:00:04.795 (60 laps)
- Fastest lap: Lewis Hamilton (Mercedes) – 1:50.417 (165.137 km/h)

=== 2015 ===
Lewis Hamilton arrived in Singapore one pole position shy of his idol Ayrton Senna's record run of eight in a row. Another win would also put Hamilton on 41 – the same number as Senna. Sebastian Vettel took his first Ferrari pole, then made it four wins at Marina Bay as Hamilton retired with a loss of electrical power just after half-distance. Daniel Ricciardo split the two Ferraris in second place, while Formula One rookie Max Verstappen shouted 'No!' when told to move over for Toro Rosso teammate Carlos Sainz.

During the 2015 race a spectator entered the track on the straight after Anderson Bridge, as leaders Sebastian Vettel and Daniel Ricciardo sped by. He climbed over the fencing when the safety car was deployed. Eventual race winner Vettel described the man as 'crazy' in his post-race interview. The 27-year-old man was arrested by Singapore police after the incident. CCTV footage showed he had sneaked through a gap in the fencing.

- Pole position: Sebastian Vettel (Ferrari) – 1:43.885 (175.521 km/h)
- Race winner: Sebastian Vettel (Ferrari) – 2:01:22.118 (61 laps)
- Fastest lap: Daniel Ricciardo (Red Bull) – 1:50.041 (165.701 km/h)

=== 2016 ===
Nico Rosberg was making his 200th Grand Prix start. He was locked in a two-man tussle for the title with Mercedes teammate Lewis Hamilton. Rosberg took pole position, and held off Daniel Ricciardo to win while Hamilton finished third. Rosberg went on to win the title.

- Pole position: Nico Rosberg (Mercedes) – 1:42.584 (177.747 km/h)
- Race winner: Nico Rosberg (Mercedes) – 1:55:48.950 (61 laps)
- Fastest lap: Daniel Ricciardo (Red Bull) – 1:47.187 (170.113 km/h)

=== 2017 ===
On 19 June 2017, the FIA's World Motor Sport Council in Geneva released its provisional 2018 calendar, in which the Singapore Grand Prix was given a tentative date of 16 September. At the time, the race (as well as the Chinese Grand Prix in Shanghai) were subject to confirmation by the commercial rights holders. On the eve of the 2017 race, the track and F1 announced an extension for the race through 2021. This race was a critical event in the season as polesitter and title contender, Sebastian Vettel, was involved in a first corner collision with Ferrari teammate Kimi Räikkönen and Red Bull's Max Verstappen, which led to the retirement of all three drivers. Vettel's title rival, Mercedes's Lewis Hamilton, took full advantage and won the race from 5th on the grid to extend his championship lead over Vettel from 3 points to 28.

- Pole position: Sebastian Vettel (Ferrari) – 1:39.491 (183.272 km/h)
- Race winner: Lewis Hamilton (Mercedes) – 2:03:23.544 (58 laps)
- Fastest lap: Lewis Hamilton (Mercedes) – 1:45.008 (173.643 km/h)

=== 2018 ===
After a disappointing weekend in Monza, Ferrari arrived in Singapore with high hopes of a victory. However, Lewis Hamilton took pole position, ahead of Max Verstappen and the Ferrari of Vettel. At the start, the two Racing Point Force India drivers, Sergio Pérez and Esteban Ocon had an incident which resulted in Ocon retiring. Vettel overtook Verstappen right before the Safety Car was deployed. Vettel was the first of the front runners to pit, on lap 15. He was put on ultrasoft tyres, while most other people who pitted during that time went for the softs. He exited behind Pérez but overtook him a lap later. Verstappen pitted for soft tyres on lap 18, and exited just in front of Vettel. Vettel, being on the higher wear ultrasofts, did not attack in order to make it to the end. On lap 34, Pérez had a clash with Sergey Sirotkin which resulted in him getting a drive-through penalty. Sirotkin himself got a 5-second time penalty after forcing Brendon Hartley off the track. Later on in the race, he was battling with Romain Grosjean as Hamilton and Verstappen approached to lap them. Instead of letting the leaders pass, Grosjean continued to attack Sirotkin, which allowed Verstappen to close the gap to Hamilton and nearly overtake him. The Frenchman was handed a 5-second penalty and 2 penalty points on his licence. In the end Hamilton won, with Verstappen second and Vettel third, increasing his championship lead over the German to 40 points.

- Pole position: Lewis Hamilton (Mercedes) – 1:36.015 (189.832 km/h)
- Race winner: Lewis Hamilton (Mercedes) – 1:51:11.611 (61 laps)
- Fastest lap: Kevin Magnussen (Haas) – 1:41.905 (178.860 km/h)

=== 2019 ===
Coming off a second consecutive victory for Ferrari under rising star Charles Leclerc, Ferrari was on course to continue their rise in form; after an early trip back to pit lane during FP1, Leclerc powered through to take pole position ahead of Lewis Hamilton and Sebastian Vettel. After making a pit stop, Leclerc lost the lead to his teammate Vettel and eventually Hamilton, who had gambled on an extended running time on the soft tyres and later came out behind both Ferrari drivers. For a brief moment, Antonio Giovinazzi led the race for the Alfa Romeo-Sauber team before being overtaken four laps later by Vettel. After Giovinazzi was passed by faster cars, three safety cars were called for the retirements of George Russell, Sergio Pérez and Kimi Räikkönen. Ultimately, the podium consisted of Sebastian Vettel, who took his last career race win, Charles Leclerc and Max Verstappen. This was Ferrari's first 1–2 finish since the 2017 Hungarian Grand Prix.

- Pole position: Charles Leclerc (Ferrari) – 1:36.217 (189.434 km/h)
- Race winner: Sebastian Vettel (Ferrari) – 1:58:33.667 (61 laps)
- Fastest lap: Kevin Magnussen (Haas) – 1:42.301 (178.168 km/h)

=== 2020–2021 ===
Both the 2020 and 2021 iterations of the event were cancelled due to the global COVID-19 pandemic and the resulting travel restrictions then-imposed by the Government of Singapore, on arriving foreign tourists.

=== 2022 ===
On 27 January 2022, the Singapore Grand Prix's contract was extended up to 2028.

- Pole position: Charles Leclerc (Ferrari) – 1:49.412 (166.588 km/h)
- Race winner: Sergio Pérez (Red Bull) – 2:02:20.238 (59 laps)
- Fastest lap: George Russell (Mercedes) – 1:46.458 (171.211 km/h)

=== 2023 ===
The Grand Prix had major changes in the layout, with turns 16–19 removed to facilitate the construction of NS Square. Instead, there was a new flat-out section until turn 16, former turn 20, with number of laps increased from 61 to 62 and lap times decreased by approximately ten seconds. Race distance was expected to be covered by an hour and a half unlike previous editions usually lasting until the two hours time limit.

- Pole position: Carlos Sainz Jr. (Ferrari) – 1:30.984 (195.462 km/h)
- Race winner: Carlos Sainz Jr. (Ferrari) – 1:46:37.418 (62 laps)
- Fastest lap: Lewis Hamilton (Mercedes) – 1:35.867 (185.507 km/h)

=== 2024 ===
The Grand Prix had a fourth DRS zone added to the circuit between turns 14 and 16 to increase overtaking, making it the second track in Formula One history, along with the Albert Park Circuit, to feature as many as four DRS zones. Lando Norris took pole position and won the race as he led every lap. He missed out on a first career grand slam as Daniel Ricciardo took the fastest lap of the race. Max Verstappen finished in second and Oscar Piastri rounded off the podium. George Russell came fourth for Mercedes, while Charles Leclerc recovered to fifth for Ferrari. Lewis Hamilton finished in sixth place as he started on a different tyre strategy. Carlos Sainz Jr. took seventh place as he started in tenth place after crashing in qualifying. Fernando Alonso, Nico Hülkenberg and Sergio Pérez rounded off the scoring positions. It was the then fastest Singapore Grand Prix, as well as the first not to feature at least one safety car.

- Pole position: Lando Norris (McLaren) – 1:29.525 (198.648 km/h)
- Race winner: Lando Norris (McLaren) – 1:40:52.571 (62 laps)
- Fastest lap: Daniel Ricciardo (RB) – 1:34.486 (188.218 km/h)

=== 2025 ===
The Grand Prix saw the increase in the pit lane speed limit from 60 km/h (37 mph) to 80 km/h (50 mph). It was the fastest Singapore Grand Prix and the first without retirements, as well as the second in a row not to feature at least one safety car.

- Pole position: George Russell (Mercedes) – 1:29.158 (198.941 km/h) All Time Lap Record
- Race winner: George Russell (Mercedes) – 1:40:22.367 (62 laps)
- Fastest lap: Lewis Hamilton (Ferrari) – 1:33.808 (189.079 km/h) Official Lap Record

=== 2026 ===
The Grand Prix featured the sprint format for the first time, which was won by Max Verstappen. It was the third Singapore Grand Prix in a row not to feature at least one safety car.

- Pole position: Max Verstappen (Red Bull) – 1:31.373 (194.118 km/h)
- Race winner: Max Verstappen (Red Bull) – 1:42:00.785 (62 laps)
- Fastest lap: Charles Leclerc (Ferrari) – 1:35.202 (179.372 km/h)

== Track description ==
Although the track has seen some minor changes as seen above, the basic layout has in many aspects remained unchanged. It is a twisty circuit that is the slowest in Formula One running at normal race distance above 305 kilometres (190 mi), which combined with its features of proximity to walls leads to frequent safety cars, further extending the running to nearing the race time limit of two hours.

The race tests the limits for both drivers and cars. It has some 90-degree turns, but with a high degree of variability, featuring technical sections and quick direction changes. Overtaking is primarily done at the end of the first sector, where top speeds are at their highest. Runoff areas exist at the end of the long straights, but are short by Formula One standards. At most parts of the track, cars run very close to the walls. In general, victory is dependent on a drivers' experience and skills.

The Singapore Grand Prix has been frequently described by drivers as being the “toughest race of the Formula 1 calendar”; the endurance of drivers is heavily strained due to various factors such as high heat, high humidity, high amount of sweat and bodily fluid loss, high number of corners (19 in total), little margin for error (due to the lack of run-off area within a street circuit) and race finishes always completing near to the 2-hour allocated time limit (with 4 races being time-limited, instead of completing the allotted laps).

== Attendance ==
Year	Average Daily Attendance	Total attendance (Three-Day)	Source
2008	100,000	300,000	
2009	83,000	249,000	
2010	81,350	244,050	
2011	82,500	247,500	
2012	84,317	252,951	
2013	87,509	262,527	
2014	84,454	253,362	
2015	86,970	260,912	
2016	73,000	218,824	
2017	86,800	260,400	
2018	87,666	263,000	
2019	89,333	268,000	
2022	100,667	302,000	
2023	88,036	264,108	
2024	89,690	269,072	
2025	100,213	300,641	
2026	100,431	301,294	

== Winners ==
=== By year ===
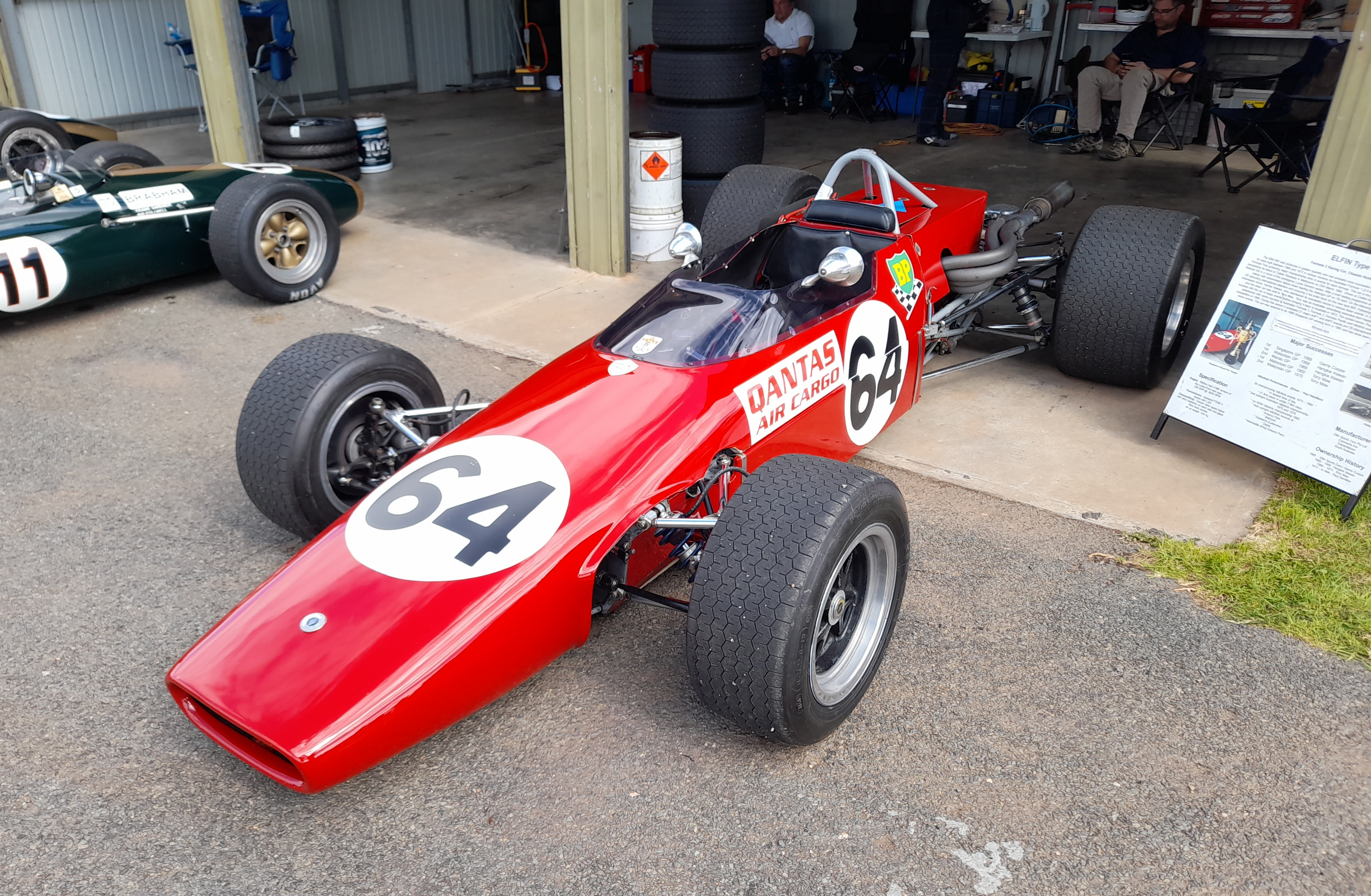
Garrie Cooper won the 1968 Singapore Grand Prix driving this Elfin 600. The car is pictured n 2021.

A pink background indicates an event which was not part of the Formula One World Championship.

Year	Driver	Constructor	Class	Location	Report
1966	(Singapore) Lee Han Seng	Lotus-Ford	Formula Libre	Thomson Road	Report
1967	(Singapore) Rodney Seow	Merlyn–Ford	Formula Libre	Thomson Road	Report
1968	(Australia) Garrie Cooper	Elfin–Ford	Formula Libre	Thomson Road	Report
1969	(New Zealand) Graeme Lawrence	McLaren-Ford	Formula Libre	Thomson Road	Report
1970	(New Zealand) Graeme Lawrence	Ferrari	Formula Libre	Thomson Road	Report
1971	(New Zealand) Graeme Lawrence	Brabham-Ford	Formula Libre	Thomson Road	Report
1972	(Australia) Max Stewart	Mildren-Ford	Formula Libre	Thomson Road	Report
1973	(Australia) Vern Schuppan	March-Hart	Formula Libre	Thomson Road	Report
1974 – 2007	Not held				
2008	(Spain) Fernando Alonso	Renault	Formula One	Marina Bay	Report
2009	(United Kingdom) Lewis Hamilton	McLaren-Mercedes	Formula One	Marina Bay	Report
2010	(Spain) Fernando Alonso	Ferrari	Formula One	Marina Bay	Report
2011	(Germany) Sebastian Vettel	Red Bull-Renault	Formula One	Marina Bay	Report
2012	(Germany) Sebastian Vettel	Red Bull-Renault	Formula One	Marina Bay	Report
2013	(Germany) Sebastian Vettel	Red Bull-Renault	Formula One	Marina Bay	Report
2014	(United Kingdom) Lewis Hamilton	Mercedes	Formula One	Marina Bay	Report
2015	(Germany) Sebastian Vettel	Ferrari	Formula One	Marina Bay	Report
2016	(Germany) Nico Rosberg	Mercedes	Formula One	Marina Bay	Report
2017	(United Kingdom) Lewis Hamilton	Mercedes	Formula One	Marina Bay	Report
2018	(United Kingdom) Lewis Hamilton	Mercedes	Formula One	Marina Bay	Report
2019	(Germany) Sebastian Vettel	Ferrari	Formula One	Marina Bay	Report
2020 – 2021	Not held due to the COVID-19 pandemic				
2022	(Mexico) Sergio Pérez	Red Bull-RBPT	Formula One	Marina Bay	Report
2023	(Spain) Carlos Sainz Jr.	Ferrari	Formula One	Marina Bay	Report
2024	(United Kingdom) Lando Norris	McLaren-Mercedes	Formula One	Marina Bay	Report
2025	(United Kingdom) George Russell	Mercedes	Formula One	Marina Bay	Report
2026	(Netherlands) Max Verstappen	Red Bull-Red Bull Ford	Formula One	Marina Bay	Report

=== Repeat winners (drivers) ===
Drivers in bold are competing in the Formula One championship in 2026.
A pink background indicates an event which was not part of the Formula One World Championship.

Wins	Driver	Years won
5	(Germany) Sebastian Vettel	2011, 2012, 2013, 2015, 2019
4	(United Kingdom) **Lewis Hamilton**	2009, 2014, 2017, 2018
3	(New Zealand) Graeme Lawrence	1969, 1970, 1971
2	(Spain) **Fernando Alonso**	2008, 2010

=== Repeat winners (constructors) ===
Teams in bold are competing in the Formula One championship in 2026.
A pink background indicates an event which was not part of the Formula One World Championship.

Wins	Constructor	Years won
5	(Italy) **Ferrari**	1970, 2010, 2015, 2019, 2023
5	(Germany) **Mercedes**	2014, 2016, 2017, 2018, 2025
5	(Austria) **Red Bull**	2011, 2012, 2013, 2022, 2026
3	(United Kingdom) **McLaren**	1969, 2009, 2024

=== Repeat winners (engine manufacturers) ===
Manufacturers in bold are competing in the Formula One championship in 2026.
A pink background indicates an event which was not part of the Formula One World Championship.

Wins	Manufacturer	Years won
7	(Germany) **Mercedes**	2009, 2014, 2016, 2017, 2018, 2024, 2025
5	(United States) Ford *	1966, 1967, 1968, 1969, 1971
5	(Italy) **Ferrari**	1970, 2010, 2015, 2019, 2023
4	(France) Renault	2008, 2011, 2012, 2013

* Built by Cosworth

== Track layouts ==
Original circuit (2008–2012)

Revised circuit with the Singapore Sling chicane at turn 10 removed (2013–2014)

Revised circuit with re-profiled turns 11–13 (2015–2017)

Revised circuit with re-profiled turns 16–17 (2018–2022)

Revised circuit with new straight between turns 15–16 (2023–2024)

Grand Prix circuit (2025–present)

== See also ==
- List of Formula One Grands Prix
