= 2022 Singapore Grand Prix =

Seventeenth round of the 2022 F1 season

Race 17 of 22 in the 2022 Formula One World Championship
← Previous race	Next race →
- Layout of the Marina Bay Street Circuit

Race details
- Date: 2 October 2022
- Official name: Formula 1 Singapore Airlines Singapore Grand Prix 2022
- Location: Marina Bay Street Circuit; Marina Bay, Singapore
- Course: Temporary street circuit
- Course length: 5.063 km (3.146 miles)
- Distance: 59 laps, 298.580 km (185.529 miles)
- Scheduled distance: 61 laps, 308.706 km (191.821 miles)
- Weather: Partly cloudy in a wet and drying track
- Attendance: 302,000

Pole position
Driver	(Monaco) Charles Leclerc	Ferrari
- Time: 1:49.412

Fastest lap
Driver	(United Kingdom) George Russell	Mercedes
- Time: 1:46.458 on lap 54

Podium
First	(Mexico) Sergio Pérez	Red Bull Racing-RBPT
Second	(Monaco) Charles Leclerc	Ferrari
Third	(Spain) Carlos Sainz Jr.	Ferrari

The 2022 Singapore Grand Prix (officially known as the Formula 1 Singapore Airlines Singapore Grand Prix 2022) was a Formula One motor race held on 2 October 2022 at the Marina Bay Street Circuit in Marina Bay, Singapore.

Although the regular 61 laps were scheduled, only 59 were completed due to the two hours time limit being reached. The start of the race was delayed by over an hour due to a thunderstorm and led to the race starting under wet conditions which gradually dried to allow slick tyres in the second half of the race. Despite a five-second time penalty, the race was won by Red Bull Racing driver Sergio Pérez, with pole sitter Charles Leclerc finishing second and his Ferrari teammate Carlos Sainz Jr. finishing third.

== Background ==
The event was held across the weekend of the 30 September – 2 October. It was the seventeenth round of the 2022 Formula One World Championship and the first time the event had been held since 2019, with the 2020 and 2021 races cancelled due to the COVID-19 pandemic. Sebastian Vettel entered as the defending race winner.

=== Championship standings before the race ===
Max Verstappen led the Drivers' Championship by 116 points from Charles Leclerc, second, and teammate Sergio Pérez, third, by 125. Red Bull Racing team led the Constructors' Championship, leading Ferrari by 139 points and Mercedes by 164 points.

Verstappen could have secured his second World Drivers' Championship in a row. He had to outscore Leclerc by 22 points, Pérez by 13 and George Russell by six. Verstappen could have won the title as follows:

	Driver		
	(Netherlands) Max Verstappen	(Monaco) Charles Leclerc	(Mexico) Sergio Pérez
Pos.	1st with fastest lap	8th or lower	4th or lower
Pos.	1st	9th or lower	4th or lower without fastest lap / 5th or lower with fastest lap

=== Entrants ===
The drivers and teams were the same as the season entry list with no additional stand-in drivers for the race. The Grand Prix marked the 350th race start for Fernando Alonso, breaking the record previously held by Kimi Räikkönen.

=== Tyre choices ===
Tyre supplier Pirelli brought the C3, C4, and C5 tyre compounds (designated hard, medium, and soft, respectively) for teams to use at the event.

=== Track changes ===
The first and the third activation point of the DRS were moved further back, being positioned 48 metres (157 ft) after turn 5 and 43 metres (141 ft) after the apex of turn 23, respectively.

== Qualifying ==
Qualifying began under wet conditions with the drivers starting on intermediate tyres, then switching to dry, soft compound tyres in Q3. Charles Leclerc took pole position, ahead of Sergio Pérez and Lewis Hamilton. Championship Leader Max Verstappen was in contention for pole position, but had to abandon his final lap after running short of fuel, leading to him qualifying eighth.

=== Qualifying classification ===
Pos.	No.	Driver	Constructor	Qualifying times			Final grid
Pos.	No.	Driver	Constructor	Q1	Q2	Q3	Final grid
1	16	(Monaco) Charles Leclerc	Ferrari	1:54.129	1:52.343	1:49.412	1
2	11	(Mexico) Sergio Pérez	Red Bull Racing-RBPT	1:54.404	1:52.818	1:49.434	2
3	44	(United Kingdom) Lewis Hamilton	Mercedes	1:53.161	1:52.691	1:49.466	3
4	55	(Spain) Carlos Sainz Jr.	Ferrari	1:54.559	1:53.219	1:49.583	4
5	14	(Spain) Fernando Alonso	Alpine-Renault	1:55.360	1:53.127	1:49.966	5
6	4	(United Kingdom) Lando Norris	McLaren-Mercedes	1:55.914	1:53.942	1:50.584	6
7	10	(France) Pierre Gasly	AlphaTauri-RBPT	1:55.606	1:53.546	1:51.211	7
8	1	(Netherlands) Max Verstappen	Red Bull Racing-RBPT	1:53.057	1:52.723	1:51.395	8
9	20	(Denmark) Kevin Magnussen	Haas-Ferrari	1:55.103	1:54.006	1:51.573	9
10	22	(Japan) Yuki Tsunoda	AlphaTauri-RBPT	1:55.314	1:53.848	1:51.983	10
11	63	(United Kingdom) George Russell	Mercedes	1:54.633	1:54.012	N/A	PL^{1}
12	18	(Canada) Lance Stroll	Aston Martin Aramco-Mercedes	1:55.629	1:54.211	N/A	11
13	47	(Germany) Mick Schumacher	Haas-Ferrari	1:55.736	1:54.370	N/A	12
14	5	(Germany) Sebastian Vettel	Aston Martin Aramco-Mercedes	1:55.602	1:54.380	N/A	13
15	24	(China) Zhou Guanyu	Alfa Romeo-Ferrari	1:55.375	1:55.518	N/A	14
16	77	(Finland) Valtteri Bottas	Alfa Romeo-Ferrari	1:56.083	N/A	N/A	15
17	3	(Australia) Daniel Ricciardo	McLaren-Mercedes	1:56.226	N/A	N/A	16
18	31	(France) Esteban Ocon	Alpine-Renault	1:56.337	N/A	N/A	17
19	23	(Thailand) Alexander Albon	Williams-Mercedes	1:56.985	N/A	N/A	18
20	6	(Canada) Nicholas Latifi	Williams-Mercedes	1:57.532	N/A	N/A	19
107% time: 2:00.971

Notes

- ^1 – George Russell qualified 11th, but was demoted to the back of the grid for exceeding his quota of power unit elements. The new power unit elements were changed while the car was under parc fermé without the permission of the technical delegate. He was therefore required to start the race from the pit lane.

== Race ==
=== Race report ===
The race was held on 2 October. It was due to start at 20:00 local time (UTC+08:00), before being delayed to 21:05 due to thunderstorms. The race started with all cars on the intermediate tyres. Sergio Pérez took the lead from Charles Leclerc into turn 1, while Carlos Sainz Jr. passed Lewis Hamilton into third place. Max Verstappen dropped to twelfth place on lap 1, before recovering to ninth by lap 7 when a safety car was triggered following a collision between Nicholas Latifi and Zhou Guanyu, forcing both to retire. Following the restart, Verstappen advanced to seventh, being unable to overtake Fernando Alonso until Alonso's retirement on lap 21 due to an engine failure. Alonso's retirement caused a virtual safety car, leading to Mercedes pitting George Russell for dry medium tyres. An additional two virtual safety car periods followed, the first when Alexander Albon struck the wall, resulting in the loss of the front wing and his retirement due to damage, and the second after Esteban Ocon suffered an engine failure. On lap 33, after running in fourth since the start of the race, Hamilton went into the wall at turn 7. He was able to re-join the track just behind Lando Norris, defending against Verstappen.

As Russell's pace improved, setting fastest laps, the rest of the field switched to slick tyres (Pierre Gasly being the first on lap 34). Due to Hamilton's accident, he additionally had to change his front wing, dropping him to ninth. Yuki Tsunoda crashed out at turn 10 on lap 36, triggering a second safety car. Having stayed out of the pits for an additional lap, this allowed the two McLarens of Norris and Daniel Ricciardo to pit for slick tyres with Norris maintaining fourth position and Ricciardo moving up to sixth after starting 16th, behind Verstappen. Upon the restart, Pérez continued to lead from Leclerc and Sainz. In an attempt to overtake Norris into turn 7, Verstappen locked up, initially falling to eighth, then requiring an extra pitstop for fresh soft tyres. This briefly placed Verstappen in last until a minor collision between Russell and Mick Schumacher, resulting in both pitting for soft tyres. After leading the majority of the race, Pérez was challenged by Leclerc for the lead. Despite Leclerc gaining DRS assistance and coming within two tenths of a second behind Pérez, he was unable to retake the lead of the race. After recovering to his starting position, Verstappen overtook Sebastian Vettel on the final lap to take seventh. Pérez, having widened his lead to 7.595 seconds late in the race, claimed his fourth career victory and first in Singapore, ahead of Leclerc in second, and Sainz in third. Russell set the fastest lap on lap 54, but finished outside of the point scoring positions.

Pérez was investigated for two separate breaches of article 55.10 of the sporting regulations - falling more than ten lengths behind the safety car, receiving a warning for the first offense, and a five-second time penalty for the second, due to repeating the offence after being warned not to. This reduced his lead to 2.595 seconds, but did not affect his race win. Because both Alonso and Ocon retired during the race, while Norris and Ricciardo finished fourth and fifth, this promoted McLaren to fourth in the Constructors' Championship ahead of Alpine. Additionally, Vettel's finish in eighth and his teammate Lance Stroll finishing in sixth, promoted Aston Martin to seventh in the Constructors' Championship. Latifi received a five-place grid penalty for the Japanese Grand Prix, for causing the collision with Zhou on lap seven.

=== Race classification ===
Pos.	No.	Driver	Constructor	Laps^{1}	Time/Retired	Grid	Points
1	11	(Mexico) Sergio Pérez	Red Bull Racing-RBPT	59	2:02:20.238^{2}	2	25
2	16	(Monaco) Charles Leclerc	Ferrari	59	+2.595	1	18
3	55	(Spain) Carlos Sainz Jr.	Ferrari	59	+10.305	4	15
4	4	(United Kingdom) Lando Norris	McLaren-Mercedes	59	+21.133	6	12
5	3	(Australia) Daniel Ricciardo	McLaren-Mercedes	59	+53.282	16	10
6	18	(Canada) Lance Stroll	Aston Martin Aramco-Mercedes	59	+56.330	11	8
7	1	(Netherlands) Max Verstappen	Red Bull Racing-RBPT	59	+58.825	8	6
8	5	(Germany) Sebastian Vettel	Aston Martin Aramco-Mercedes	59	+1:00.032	13	4
9	44	(United Kingdom) Lewis Hamilton	Mercedes	59	+1:01.515	3	2
10	10	(France) Pierre Gasly	AlphaTauri-RBPT	59	+1:09.576	7	1
11	77	(Finland) Valtteri Bottas	Alfa Romeo-Ferrari	59	+1:28.844	15	
12	20	(Denmark) Kevin Magnussen	Haas-Ferrari	59	+1:32.610	9	
13	47	(Germany) Mick Schumacher	Haas-Ferrari	58	+1 lap	12	
14	63	(United Kingdom) George Russell	Mercedes	57	+2 laps	PL	
Ret	22	(Japan) Yuki Tsunoda	AlphaTauri-RBPT	34	Accident	10	
Ret	31	(France) Esteban Ocon	Alpine-Renault	26	Engine	17	
Ret	23	(Thailand) Alexander Albon	Williams-Mercedes	25	Accident damage	18	
Ret	14	(Spain) Fernando Alonso	Alpine-Renault	20	Engine	5	
Ret	6	(Canada) Nicholas Latifi	Williams-Mercedes	7	Collision damage	19	
Ret	24	(China) Zhou Guanyu	Alfa Romeo-Ferrari	6	Collision	14	
Fastest lap: (United Kingdom) George Russell (Mercedes) – 1:46.458 (lap 54)

Notes

- ^1 – The race distance was initially scheduled to be 61 laps before being shortened due to the maximum race time being reached.
- ^2 – Sergio Pérez received a five-second time penalty for falling more than ten car lengths behind during the safety car. His final position was not affected by the penalty.

== Championship standings after the race ==
Drivers' Championship standings

Pos.	Driver	Points
1	(Netherlands) **Max Verstappen***	341
2	(Monaco) **Charles Leclerc***	237
3	(Mexico) **Sergio Pérez***	235
4	(United Kingdom) George Russell	203
5	(Spain) Carlos Sainz Jr.	202

Constructors' Championship standings

	Pos.	Constructor	Points
	1	(Austria) **Red Bull Racing-RBPT***	576
	2	(Italy) **Ferrari***	439
	3	(Germany) Mercedes	373
1	4	(United Kingdom) McLaren-Mercedes	129
1	5	(France) Alpine-Renault	125

- Note: Only the top five positions are included for both sets of standings.
- *Competitor in bold and marked with an asterisk still had a theoretical chance of becoming World Champion.

== See also ==
- 2022 W Series Singapore round

Previous race: 2022 Italian Grand Prix	FIA Formula One World Championship; 2022 season	Next race: 2022 Japanese Grand Prix
Previous race: 2019 Singapore Grand Prix	Singapore Grand Prix	Next race: 2023 Singapore Grand Prix
