= 2019 Singapore Grand Prix =

Fifteenth round of the 2019 Formula One season

Race 15 of 21 in the 2019 Formula One World Championship
← Previous race	Next race →
- Layout of the Marina Bay Street Circuit

Race details
- Date: 22 September 2019
- Official name: Formula 1 Singapore Airlines Singapore Grand Prix 2019
- Location: Marina Bay Street Circuit; Marina Bay, Singapore
- Course: Temporary street circuit
- Course length: 5.063 km (3.146 miles)
- Distance: 61 laps, 308.706 km (191.821 miles)
- Weather: Slightly hazy
- Attendance: 268,000

Pole position
Driver	(Monaco) Charles Leclerc	Ferrari
- Time: 1:36.217

Fastest lap
Driver	(Denmark) Kevin Magnussen	Haas-Ferrari
- Time: 1:42.301 on lap 58

Podium
First	(Germany) Sebastian Vettel	Ferrari
Second	(Monaco) Charles Leclerc	Ferrari
Third	(Netherlands) Max Verstappen	Red Bull Racing-Honda

The 2019 Singapore Grand Prix (formally known as the Formula 1 Singapore Airlines Singapore Grand Prix 2019) was a Formula One motor race held on 22 September 2019 at the Marina Bay Street Circuit in Marina Bay, Singapore. The race was the 15th round of the 2019 Formula One World Championship and marked the 20th running of the Singapore Grand Prix and the 12th time the race had been held at Marina Bay.

Sebastian Vettel (Ferrari) won the race ahead of teammate Charles Leclerc and Max Verstappen (Red Bull), while Kevin Magnussen set the fastest lap. This was the last race in the micro-nation for two years, as the 2020 and 2021 races were cancelled due to the COVID-19 pandemic. It was also the last win and 1–2 finish for Ferrari until the 2022 Bahrain Grand Prix, as well as Vettel's last win of his F1 career and, as of 2026, the most recent win for a German Formula One driver.

== Background ==
=== Track changes ===
Ahead of the race it was announced that a third DRS zone would be added between turns 13 and 14, down the Esplanade Drive, to aid overtaking. The detection point is established before turn 13.

=== Championship standings before the race ===
Entering the round Lewis Hamilton and Mercedes led the drivers and constructors championships by 63 and 154 points respectively. The size of their leads meant that both would still be leading their respective championships after the race regardless of the race's outcome.

=== Entries ===
The drivers and teams entered were the same as those for the previous race with no additional stand-in drivers for the race or practice. This race was the first occasion that Haas entered a race without title sponsor Rich Energy following the termination of the sponsorship contract.

== Practice ==
=== FP1 ===
Charles Leclerc retired early into FP1 and Mercedes' Valtteri Bottas suffered a snap of oversteer, causing a crash at Turn 19. Thus, a red flag was brought out. Max Verstappen led the timing charts, 0.167 seconds ahead of 2nd place Sebastian Vettel (Ferrari) during the practice session. Nico Hülkenberg (Renault) set an impressive time, landing him 6th on the timing charts, albeit 1.5 seconds off of Verstappen.

=== FP2 ===
Early in the session Alexander Albon (Red Bull) lost his front wing after locking up and bumping the wall at Turn 10. Lewis Hamilton (Mercedes) gained an edge over Verstappen during the session, topping timing charts 0.184 seconds ahead of him. Leclerc managed to set a lap, though he was 1.245 seconds off of Hamilton. The two Ferrari drivers were reportedly frustrated after encountering numerous traffic incidents. Carlos Sainz (McLaren) managed P7, 1.3 seconds off of Hamilton.

== Qualifying ==
=== Qualifying classification ===
Pos.	Car no.	Driver	Constructor	Qualifying times			Final grid
Pos.	Car no.	Driver	Constructor	Q1	Q2	Q3	Final grid
1	16	(Monaco) Charles Leclerc	Ferrari	1:38.014	1:36.650	1:36.217	1
2	44	(United Kingdom) Lewis Hamilton	Mercedes	1:37.565	1:36.933	1:36.408	2
3	5	(Germany) Sebastian Vettel	Ferrari	1:38.374	1:36.720	1:36.437	3
4	33	(Netherlands) Max Verstappen	Red Bull Racing-Honda	1:38.540	1:37.089	1:36.813	4
5	77	(Finland) Valtteri Bottas	Mercedes	1:37.317	1:37.142	1:37.146	5
6	23	(Thailand) Alexander Albon	Red Bull Racing-Honda	1:39.106	1:37.865	1:37.411	6
7	55	(Spain) Carlos Sainz Jr.	McLaren-Renault	1:38.882	1:37.982	1:37.818	7
8	27	(Germany) Nico Hülkenberg	Renault	1:39.001	1:38.580	1:38.264	8
9	4	(United Kingdom) Lando Norris	McLaren-Renault	1:38.606	1:37.572	1:38.329	9
10	11	(Mexico) Sergio Pérez	Racing Point-BWT Mercedes	1:39.909	1:38.620	N/A	15^{a}
11	99	(Italy) Antonio Giovinazzi	Alfa Romeo Racing-Ferrari	1:39.272	1:38.697	N/A	10
12	10	(France) Pierre Gasly	Scuderia Toro Rosso-Honda	1:39.085	1:38.699	N/A	11
13	7	(Finland) Kimi Räikkönen	Alfa Romeo Racing-Ferrari	1:39.454	1:38.858	N/A	12
14	20	(Denmark) Kevin Magnussen	Haas-Ferrari	1:39.942	1:39.650	N/A	13
15	26	(Russia) Daniil Kvyat	Scuderia Toro Rosso-Honda	1:39.957	N/A	N/A	14
16	18	(Canada) Lance Stroll	Racing Point-BWT Mercedes	1:39.979	N/A	N/A	16
17	8	(France) Romain Grosjean	Haas-Ferrari	1:40.277	N/A	N/A	17
18	63	(United Kingdom) George Russell	Williams-Mercedes	1:40.867	N/A	N/A	18
19	88	(Poland) Robert Kubica	Williams-Mercedes	1:41.186	N/A	N/A	19
107% time: 1:44.129
DSQ^{b}	3	(Australia) Daniel Ricciardo	Renault	1:39.362	1:38.399	1:38.095	20

Notes

- ^a – Sergio Pérez received a five-place grid penalty for an unscheduled gearbox change.
- ^b – Daniel Ricciardo qualified eighth, but was disqualified for exceeding the MGU-K power limit during Q1. He was allowed to race at the stewards' discretion. He also received a 10-place grid penalty for exceeding his quota for power unit components. The penalty made no difference as he was disqualified.

== Race ==
Daniel Ricciardo (Renault) and George Russell (Williams) made contact at turn one on the first lap, causing damage to Russell's front wing. Nico Hülkenberg (Renault) and Carlos Sainz Jr. (McLaren) collided at turn five, also on lap one, with both cars suffering punctures. Russell, Hülkenberg and Sainz subsequently all made pit stops at the end of the first lap, fitting the hard-compound tyres with Russell also replacing his front wing. Sainz's mechanics encountered a problem with the rear jack during his pit stop and the car was therefore stationary for 42.4 seconds. Sainz subsequently emerged from the pits a lap down on the leaders and with aerodynamic damage caused by the punctured tyre.

For the following laps, the leaders of the race cut their pace considerably in order to conserve tyres and manage their cars' temperatures, often lapping nearly 15 seconds slower than the pole time. This had the effect of bunching up the field, and the usual gap between the front-running and midfield cars did not appear. At the end of lap 19, Sebastian Vettel (Ferrari) and Max Verstappen (Red Bull) became the first of the front-runners to make a pit stop, from third and fourth place respectively. Vettel emerged in tenth place, whilst Verstappen emerged in twelfth behind Hülkenberg. Charles Leclerc made his pit stop from the lead on the following lap, emerging behind his Ferrari teammate and thus handing the net lead of the race to Vettel.

Lewis Hamilton (Mercedes), who was yet to stop, inherited the lead of the race. Valtteri Bottas made his pit stop at the end of lap 22, emerging behind Verstappen and ahead of Alexander Albon (Red Bull), maintaining his net position. Hamilton was left out on ageing soft-compound tyres until the end of lap 26, in the hope that the Ferrari drivers, at the time running in sixth and seventh, would be slowed down by the midfield cars ahead. This plan did not work, and Hamilton emerged from the pits not only behind both Ferrari drivers, but also almost six seconds behind Verstappen. Hamilton did come out ahead of his teammate Bottas, who was instructed to slow down after his pit stop to ensure Hamilton would leave the pit lane ahead of him. Due to the slow pace of the lead cars in previous laps, they emerged behind the midfield cars of Antonio Giovinazzi (Alfa Romeo), Pierre Gasly (Toro Rosso), Ricciardo and Lance Stroll (Racing Point). Vettel and Leclerc began to make their way through this group, with Vettel cementing his net lead by clearing the cars quicker than his teammate. Giovinazzi held the lead of the race for four laps until he was overtaken by Vettel on lap 31. This marked the first time Alfa Romeo had led a race lap since Andrea de Cesaris led the 1983 Belgian Grand Prix.

After the front-running cars had cleared the midfield cars on lap 34, the order was Vettel, Leclerc, Verstappen, Hamilton, Bottas, Albon, Giovinazzi, Ricciardo, Hülkenberg and Lando Norris (McLaren). Ricciardo attempted an overtake on Giovinazzi, with the two cars colliding. Giovinazzi was pushed off the track and lost places to Hülkenberg and Norris, whilst Ricciardo suffered a puncture causing him to drop down the order and forcing a pit stop at the end of the lap. He emerged from the pits in 18th place. On lap 34, Romain Grosjean (Haas) attempted to overtake Russell around the outside of turn eight. Grosjean clipped the left rear of Russell's car, causing the Williams to swerve into the outside wall. This marked Willams' first retirement of the season and the first retirement of Russell's career. The incident brought out the safety car as the Williams was cleared from the track. Grosjean suffered a damaged front wing, making a pit stop at the end of the lap for a replacement and dropping him to 18th place. The stewards later deemed the collision a racing incident, and no action was taken.

Racing resumed on lap 41. Lance Stroll, running in 13th place, clipped the inside of the wall at turn 17, causing a puncture and front wing damage. He returned to the pits and emerged last of the running cars in 19th. On lap 43, Stroll's teammate Sergio Pérez pulled over to the side of the track from tenth place after suffering an oil leak. The safety car was brought out whilst the marshals removed Pérez's stranded car. Racing resumed again on lap 48, on lap 50 Daniil Kvyat (Toro Rosso) attempted an overtake for twelfth place on the inside of Kimi Räikkönen (Alfa Romeo) at turn one. The cars made contact through their front wheels and the impact broke the suspension of Räikkönen's car. The incident brought out the third safety car of the race.

The safety car came in on lap 52. The final ten laps saw Charles Leclerc unsuccessfully attempt to catch his teammate Sebastian Vettel. After being overtaken by Robert Kubica (Williams) and falling to last place, Kevin Magnussen (Haas) took a pit stop at the end of lap 57, switching to soft-compound tyres and setting the fastest lap of the race. Since he finished the race in 17th place, Magnussen was not awarded the point for the fastest lap, which is only available if the driver finishes in the top ten. Vettel crossed the finish line to take victory, his first win since the 2018 Belgian Grand Prix. It was also his final win in his Formula 1 career. With Leclerc finishing second, this was Ferrari's first 1–2 finish since the 2017 Hungarian Grand Prix.

After the race Giovinazzi was summoned to the stewards for allegedly driving too close to the recovery crane after George Russell's crash on lap 34. Giovinazzi was given a 10-second penalty, however, since he finished 18 seconds ahead of Romain Grosjean, this did not affect his tenth-place finish.

=== Race classification ===
Pos.	No.	Driver	Constructor	Laps	Time/Retired	Grid	Points
1	5	(Germany) Sebastian Vettel	Ferrari	61	1:58:33.667	3	25
2	16	(Monaco) Charles Leclerc	Ferrari	61	+2.641	1	18
3	33	(Netherlands) Max Verstappen	Red Bull Racing-Honda	61	+3.821	4	15
4	44	(United Kingdom) Lewis Hamilton	Mercedes	61	+4.608	2	12
5	77	(Finland) Valtteri Bottas	Mercedes	61	+6.119	5	10
6	23	(Thailand) Alexander Albon	Red Bull Racing-Honda	61	+11.663	6	8
7	4	(United Kingdom) Lando Norris	McLaren-Renault	61	+14.769	9	6
8	10	(France) Pierre Gasly	Scuderia Toro Rosso-Honda	61	+15.547	11	4
9	27	(Germany) Nico Hülkenberg	Renault	61	+16.718	8	2
10	99	(Italy) Antonio Giovinazzi	Alfa Romeo Racing-Ferrari	61	+27.855^{1}	10	1
11	8	(France) Romain Grosjean	Haas-Ferrari	61	+35.436	17	
12	55	(Spain) Carlos Sainz Jr.	McLaren-Renault	61	+35.974	7	
13	18	(Canada) Lance Stroll	Racing Point-BWT Mercedes	61	+36.419	16	
14	3	(Australia) Daniel Ricciardo	Renault	61	+37.660	20	
15	26	(Russia) Daniil Kvyat	Scuderia Toro Rosso-Honda	61	+38.178	14	
16	88	(Poland) Robert Kubica	Williams-Mercedes	61	+47.024	19	
17	20	(Denmark) Kevin Magnussen	Haas-Ferrari	61	+1:26.522	13	
Ret	7	(Finland) Kimi Räikkönen	Alfa Romeo Racing-Ferrari	49	Collision	12	
Ret	11	(Mexico) Sergio Pérez	Racing Point-BWT Mercedes	42	Oil leak	15	
Ret	63	(United Kingdom) George Russell	Williams-Mercedes	34	Collision	18	
Fastest lap: (Denmark) Kevin Magnussen (Haas-Ferrari) – 1:42.301 (lap 58)

Notes

- ^1 – Antonio Giovinazzi received a 10-second post-race time penalty for failing to follow the race director's instructions and causing an unsafe situation. His final position was not affected by the penalty as he had finished 18 seconds ahead of Romain Grosjean.

== Championship standings after the race ==
Drivers' Championship standings

	Pos.	Driver	Points
	1	(United Kingdom) Lewis Hamilton	296
	2	(Finland) Valtteri Bottas	231
1	3	(Monaco) Charles Leclerc	200
1	4	(Netherlands) Max Verstappen	200
	5	(Germany) Sebastian Vettel	194

Constructors' Championship standings

Pos.	Constructor	Points
1	(Germany) Mercedes	527
2	(Italy) Ferrari	394
3	(Austria) Red Bull Racing-Honda	289
4	(United Kingdom) McLaren-Renault	89
5	(France) Renault	67

Note

- Only the top five positions for each set of standings are shown

Previous race: 2019 Italian Grand Prix	FIA Formula One World Championship; 2019 season	Next race: 2019 Russian Grand Prix
Previous race: 2018 Singapore Grand Prix	Singapore Grand Prix	Next race: 2022 Singapore Grand Prix; 2020 and 2021 editions cancelled
