= 2024 Singapore Grand Prix =

Eighteenth round of the 2024 F1 season

Race 18 of 24 in the 2024 Formula One World Championship
← Previous race	Next race →
- Layout of the Marina Bay Street Circuit

Race details
- Date: 22 September 2024
- Official name: Formula 1 Singapore Airlines Singapore Grand Prix 2024
- Location: Marina Bay Street Circuit; Marina Bay, Singapore
- Course: Temporary street circuit
- Course length: 4.940 km (3.070 miles)
- Distance: 62 laps, 306.143 km (190.228 miles)
- Weather: Clear
- Attendance: 269,072

Pole position
Driver	(United Kingdom) Lando Norris	McLaren-Mercedes
- Time: 1:29.525

Fastest lap
Driver	(Australia) Daniel Ricciardo	RB-Honda RBPT
- Time: 1:34.486 on lap 60 (lap record)

Podium
First	(United Kingdom) Lando Norris	McLaren-Mercedes
Second	(Netherlands) Max Verstappen	Red Bull Racing-Honda RBPT
Third	(Australia) Oscar Piastri	McLaren-Mercedes

The 2024 Singapore Grand Prix (officially known as the Formula 1 Singapore Airlines Singapore Grand Prix 2024) was a Formula One motor race that was held on 22 September 2024 at the Marina Bay Street Circuit in Marina Bay, Singapore. It was the eighteenth round of the 2024 Formula One World Championship.

A disrupted qualifying session was topped by Lando Norris of McLaren, taking his sixth career pole position; he went on to lead all laps of the race to take victory over Max Verstappen of Red Bull Racing and Norris' teammate Oscar Piastri. This was McLaren's second win at the Marina Bay Street Circuit following the 2009 race, and the first time that McLaren won consecutive Grands Prix since the final two races of the 2012 season. It was the fastest Singapore Grand Prix, as well as the first not to feature at least one safety car period or yellow flag. This was the 257th and final race start for eight-time Grand Prix winner Daniel Ricciardo, who finished in 18th place and took the fastest lap of the race; he was replaced by Liam Lawson from the following United States Grand Prix onwards.

As a result, Norris narrowed Verstappen's points advantage in the World Drivers' Championship to 52 points with six races left. While the top five in the Constructors' Championship remained unchanged, the result enabled McLaren to extend their lead to 41 points over Red Bull.

== Background ==
The event was held at the Marina Bay Street Circuit in Marina Bay for the 15th time in the circuit's history, across the weekend of 20–22 September. The Grand Prix was the eighteenth round of the 2024 Formula One World Championship and the 15th running of the Singapore Grand Prix as a round of the Formula One World Championship.

=== Championship standings before the race ===
Going into the weekend, Max Verstappen led the Drivers' Championship with 313 points, 59 points ahead of Lando Norris in second, and 78 ahead of Charles Leclerc in third. McLaren, holding 476 points, entered this round as the leader of the Constructors' Championship from Red Bull Racing and Ferrari, who were second and third with 456 and 425 points, respectively.

=== Entrants ===
The drivers and teams were the same as the season entry list with the exception of Franco Colapinto, who replaced Logan Sargeant at Williams from the Italian Grand Prix onwards. Kevin Magnussen of Haas returned to the grid, having served his one-race ban during the preceding Azerbaijan Grand Prix, with reserve driver Oliver Bearman taking his place.

The Grand Prix marked Lewis Hamilton's 350th and Carlos Sainz Jr.'s 200th Grand Prix starts, respectively. The Grand Prix also marked the 257th and final race start for Daniel Ricciardo of RB, who left the team four days after achieving the fastest lap in the event. He was replaced by Liam Lawson from the following United States Grand Prix onwards.

=== Tyre choices ===
Tyre supplier Pirelli brought the C3, C4, and C5 tyre compounds (the softest three in their range) designated hard, medium, and soft, respectively, for teams to use at the event.

=== Track changes ===
A fourth DRS zone was added between turns 14 and 16 in the same section of the circuit that was reconfigured for the previous iteration.

== Practice ==
Three free practice sessions were held for the event. The first free practice session was held on 20 September 2024, at 17:30 local time (UTC+8), and was topped by Charles Leclerc of Ferrari ahead of Lando Norris of McLaren and Leclerc's teammate Carlos Sainz Jr. The second free practice session was held on the same day, at 21:00 local time, and was topped by Norris ahead of Leclerc and Sainz. The third practice session was held on 21 September 2024, at 17:30 local time, and was topped by Norris ahead of George Russell of Mercedes and Norris's teammate Oscar Piastri.

== Qualifying ==
Qualifying was held on 21 September 2024, at 21:00 local time (UTC+8).

=== Qualifying report ===
A red flag was observed during Q3 for Carlos Sainz Jr.'s crash into the walls as he started his lap, damaging his car and forcing him out of further runs. Lando Norris took pole position for McLaren, his sixth career pole position and fifth of the season, ahead of Max Verstappen in second and Lewis Hamilton in third.

=== Qualifying classification ===
Pos.	No.	Driver	Constructor	Qualifying times			Final grid
Pos.	No.	Driver	Constructor	Q1	Q2	Q3	Final grid
1	4	(United Kingdom) Lando Norris	McLaren-Mercedes	1:30.002	1:30.007	1:29.525	1
2	1	(Netherlands) Max Verstappen	Red Bull Racing-Honda RBPT	1:30.157	1:29.680	1:29.728	2
3	44	(United Kingdom) Lewis Hamilton	Mercedes	1:30.393	1:29.929	1:29.841	3
4	63	(United Kingdom) George Russell	Mercedes	1:30.811	1:30.153	1:29.867	4
5	81	(Australia) Oscar Piastri	McLaren-Mercedes	1:30.258	1:29.640	1:29.953	5
6	27	(Germany) Nico Hülkenberg	Haas-Ferrari	1:30.724	1:30.150	1:30.115	6
7	14	(Spain) Fernando Alonso	Aston Martin Aramco-Mercedes	1:30.684	1:30.450	1:30.214	7
8	22	(Japan) Yuki Tsunoda	RB-Honda RBPT	1:30.716	1:30.289	1:30.354	8
9	16	(Monaco) Charles Leclerc	Ferrari	1:30.786	1:29.747	No time	9
10	55	(Spain) Carlos Sainz Jr.	Ferrari	1:30.670	1:30.108	No time	10
11	23	(Thailand) Alexander Albon	Williams-Mercedes	1:30.679	1:30.474	N/A	11
12	43	(Argentina) Franco Colapinto	Williams-Mercedes	1:30.704	1:30.481	N/A	12
13	11	(Mexico) Sergio Pérez	Red Bull Racing-Honda RBPT	1:30.624	1:30.579	N/A	13
14	20	(Denmark) Kevin Magnussen	Haas-Ferrari	1:30.829	1:30.653	N/A	14
15	31	(France) Esteban Ocon	Alpine-Renault	1:30.958	1:30.769	N/A	15
16	3	(Australia) Daniel Ricciardo	RB-Honda RBPT	1:31.085	N/A	N/A	16
17	18	(Canada) Lance Stroll	Aston Martin Aramco-Mercedes	1:31.094	N/A	N/A	17
18	10	(France) Pierre Gasly	Alpine-Renault	1:31.312	N/A	N/A	18
19	77	(Finland) Valtteri Bottas	Kick Sauber-Ferrari	1:31.572	N/A	N/A	19
20	24	(China) Zhou Guanyu	Kick Sauber-Ferrari	1:32.054	N/A	N/A	20
107% time: 1:36.302

== Race ==
The race was held on 22 September 2024, at 20:00 local time (UTC+8), and was run for 62 laps.

=== Race report ===
The race was won by polesitter Lando Norris in his McLaren, his third of the season. Championship leader Max Verstappen and Norris's teammate Oscar Piastri rounded out the podium. It was the fastest Singapore Grand Prix, as well as the first not to feature at least one safety car or yellow flag, with the only retirements of Alexander Albon and Kevin Magnussen occurring in the pits. Daniel Ricciardo finished with the fastest lap, but was ineligible for the bonus point, coming home outside the top ten in 18th. This would be Ricciardo's 17th and final fastest lap, and his 257th and final race start, as he departed RB days after the race. Norris's win took seven points out of Verstappen's Drivers' Championship lead, with 52 points separating the two drivers with six rounds to go. Verstappen's Red Bull teammate Sergio Pérez's tenth place finish increased McLaren's Constructors' Championship lead to 41 points.

=== Race classification ===
Pos.	No.	Driver	Constructor	Laps	Time/Retired	Grid	Points
1	4	(United Kingdom) Lando Norris	McLaren-Mercedes	62	1:40:52.571	1	25
2	1	(Netherlands) Max Verstappen	Red Bull Racing-Honda RBPT	62	+20.945	2	18
3	81	(Australia) Oscar Piastri	McLaren-Mercedes	62	+41.823	5	15
4	63	(United Kingdom) George Russell	Mercedes	62	+1:01.040	4	12
5	16	(Monaco) Charles Leclerc	Ferrari	62	+1:02.430	9	10
6	44	(United Kingdom) Lewis Hamilton	Mercedes	62	+1:25.248	3	8
7	55	(Spain) Carlos Sainz Jr.	Ferrari	62	+1:36.039	10	6
8	14	(Spain) Fernando Alonso	Aston Martin Aramco-Mercedes	61	+1 lap	7	4
9	27	(Germany) Nico Hülkenberg	Haas-Ferrari	61	+1 lap	6	2
10	11	(Mexico) Sergio Pérez	Red Bull Racing-Honda RBPT	61	+1 lap	13	1
11	43	(Argentina) Franco Colapinto	Williams-Mercedes	61	+1 lap	12	
12	22	(Japan) Yuki Tsunoda	RB-Honda RBPT	61	+1 lap	8	
13	31	(France) Esteban Ocon	Alpine-Renault	61	+1 lap	15	
14	18	(Canada) Lance Stroll	Aston Martin Aramco-Mercedes	61	+1 lap	17	
15	24	(China) Zhou Guanyu	Kick Sauber-Ferrari	61	+1 lap	20	
16	77	(Finland) Valtteri Bottas	Kick Sauber-Ferrari	61	+1 lap	19	
17	10	(France) Pierre Gasly	Alpine-Renault	61	+1 lap	18	
18	3	(Australia) Daniel Ricciardo	RB-Honda RBPT	61	+1 lap	16	
19^{a}	20	(Denmark) Kevin Magnussen	Haas-Ferrari	57	Puncture	14	
Ret	23	(Thailand) Alexander Albon	Williams-Mercedes	15	Overheating	11	
Fastest lap: (Australia) Daniel Ricciardo (RB-Honda RBPT) – 1:34.486 (lap 60)

Notes

- ^a – Kevin Magnussen was classified as he completed more than 90% of the race distance.

== Championship standings after the race ==
Drivers' Championship standings

Pos.	Driver	Points
1	(Netherlands) Max Verstappen	331
2	(United Kingdom) Lando Norris	279
3	(Monaco) Charles Leclerc	245
4	(Australia) Oscar Piastri	237
5	(Spain) Carlos Sainz Jr.	190

Constructors' Championship standings

Pos.	Constructor	Points
1	(United Kingdom) McLaren-Mercedes	516
2	(Austria) Red Bull Racing-Honda RBPT	475
3	(Italy) Ferrari	441
4	(Germany) Mercedes	329
5	(United Kingdom) Aston Martin Aramco-Mercedes	86

- Note: Only the top five positions are included for both sets of standings.

Previous race: 2024 Azerbaijan Grand Prix	FIA Formula One World Championship; 2024 season	Next race: 2024 United States Grand Prix
Previous race: 2023 Singapore Grand Prix	Singapore Grand Prix	Next race: 2025 Singapore Grand Prix
