= Mediacorp 5 =

English television channel in Singapore

- Country: Singapore
- Broadcast area: Singapore; Malaysia (Johor); Indonesia (Riau Islands)
- Headquarters: Mediacorp Campus, 1 Stars Avenue, Singapore 138507

Programming
- Language: English
- Picture format: 1080i HDTV

Ownership
- Owner: Mediacorp
- Sister channels: 8 U Suria; Vasantham; CNA

History
- Launched: 15 February 1963; 63 years ago (as TV Singapura); 2 April 1963; 63 years ago (as TV Singapura Channel 5)

Links
- Website: Channel 5

Availability

Terrestrial
- Digital terrestrial television: UHF Channel 29 (538MHz); LCN: 2 (HD)

Streaming media
- meWATCH: Available on meWATCH website or mobile app (Singapore only)

Mediacorp 5 is an English-language free-to-air terrestrial television channel in Singapore, owned by the state-owned media conglomerate Mediacorp. It airs a generalist format including domestic and imported entertainment programming, news, and sports coverage.

The channel began broadcasting on 15 February 1963 as the pilot service TV Singapura, the region's first television service. It officially launched on 2 April 1963. It initially broadcast programming in the official languages of English, Chinese, Malay and Tamil; Chinese and Tamil programming were later spun off to 8 in 1973, and Malay programming moved to 12 in 1994, leaving 5 as an English-language service.

== History ==
=== Television Singapura/RTS ===
On 3 January 1963, the Singaporean government announced the start of pilot programming effective 15 February. The station was set to broadcast on VHF channel 5 in the 625-line television standard and would provide a license fee of $24 per year ($2 per month), touted at the time as being "one of the cheapest in this part of the world". The output from the start of the pilot service was going to last less than two hours, before extending to four hours by April. A second channel was slated to start between August and September of the same year. By the time of the March extension, the service was going to carry filmed programming in English and Hokkien, before gradually extending to include Mandarin, Malay, Tamil and other Chinese varieties. The regular service would provide, effective April, a four-hour schedule in the official languages of Singapore. A temporary studio was built on Caldecott Hill in the precincts of Radio Singapore and a television transmitter at Bukit Batok was erected. The staff consisted of experienced workers coming from the United Kingdom, Australia and Japan. Ahead of the start of the pilot service, it was recommended for manufacturers of television sets to ensure that their presets would match Channel 5 and Channel 8.

The channel first launched as a pilot service, TV Singapura on 15 February 1963. Chong Yan Ling and Lucy Leong were two of the four women who appeared for the opening lines of TV Singapura on its launch day. Minister for Culture S. Rajaratnam introduced its inaugural night of programming, which included the documentary TV Looks at Singapore, imported cartoons and comedy programmes, the Malay variety show Rampaian Malaysia (Malaysian Medley), and news. Rajaratnam stated that "tonight might well mark the start of a social and cultural revolution in our lives." The pilot service would broadcast 100 minutes of programmes per-night. At the time, it was estimated that only one in 58 persons in Singapore owned a television set. Airtime began to increase on 11 March, before reaching the four-hour target in April.

While many viewers found television as a source of entertainment, the real purpose of the new service was a mere tool against supporters of communism who were against Singapore's merger with Malaysia. The first newsreader on launch night was Steven Lee, while the first newsreel (Berita Singapura) was read by Harry Crabb, who later appeared in the regular bulletins. The news division was assisted by Australian David Prior, who trained locals in the field of television journalism. At the time, it was projected that Prior would stay with TV Singapura for two years. Continuity announcers were also a central part of the staff, primarily appearing at start-up and at closedown delivering the schedule. Among the initial set of announcers were Mildred Appaduray (English), Kamala Dorai (Tamil), Hsu Fong Lim (Mandarin) and Zaiton Haji Mohamed (Malay).

On 2 April 1963, the channel was formally inaugurated by President Yusof Ishak as TV Singapura Channel 5. It expanded its broadcast day to four hours per-night, broadcasting from 7:15 p.m. to 11:15 p.m. SGT in the four official languages. By the time of the launch of the regular service, TV sets were now available in 7000 households, per a Straits Times survey. A bespoke "second" channel opened on AM radio (1370 kHz) in June providing a second audio track for selected programming. On 31 August 1963, a second channel, Channel 8, began test broadcasts.

In January 1964, Channel 5 and 8 became regional affiliates of TV Malaysia. Television advertising started on 15 January the same year. Following Singapore's separation from Malaysia, Channel 5 and Channel 8 became part of the new state broadcaster Radio Television Singapore, and was subsequently rebranded as RTS Channel 5. The first post-independence Grand Prix was held in Singapore was carried by the channel. A fire hit TV Singapura's main studio on 16 August 1965, affecting its schedule. Both channels moved to Television Centre on Caldecott Hill on 26 August 1966. As late as that period, the RTS channels were still known in some way as TV Singapura. The relocation was marked with a variety show, Pestarama, and an extension of its on-air hours.

Beginning 30 March 1973, RTS divided its language-based programming between the two channels, with Channel 5 becoming responsible for English and Malay programmes (after having broadcast in all four official languages since its launch).

In 1974, Channel 5 began experimental colour broadcasts, including live coverage of the 1974 FIFA World Cup final. Channel 5 broadcast its first domestic programme in colour, the National Day parade, on 9 August. In late 1979, the channel conducted engineering tests after closedown, airing selected programming in colour before their supposed first runs later, confusing some viewers.

=== SBC 5 ===
On 1 February 1980, RTS was dissolved and replaced by the Singapore Broadcasting Corporation (SBC), which would operate as a statutory enterprise similar to the BBC rather than as a division of the Ministry of Culture, with the channel accordingly rebranded SBC 5.

In April 1982, SBC 5 introduced new programmes for its afternoon slot, including repeats of Chinese dramas and programmes aimed at pre-school and early school children. The soap opera The Young and the Restless was removed from the lineup due to its plot and themes not reflecting the social norms of the country. Emergency broadcasts from Jurong were broadcast on the early hours of 14 September 1983, for a two-hour period after the channel's closedown. This was done in case the main facilities were facing a breakdown. SBC 5 extended transmission hours on 26 February 1984, from 11:15 p.m. to 11:45 p.m. on Sundays and Tuesdays, 12:00 m.n. on Mondays and 11:50 p.m on Wednesdays due to complaints from viewers on the early closing times, which turned out to be a "temporary feature" due to the launch of SBC 12.

On 12 October 1987, SBC 5 revamped its 3-to-6-p.m. afternoon slot to attract more viewers, especially shift workers. Mandarin drama repeats and a music programme which used to air at 3 p.m. now air an hour later.

Sunday Morning Singapore, a pre-recorded magazine programme, debuted on 3 April 1988. The initial presenters were Tisa Ng and Paul Kuah, selected from an audition. Along with the debut of the programme, a drama slot at 2 p.m. was introduced while the Sunday afternoon movie slot Movie Parade moved to 3 p.m. A Saturday afternoon sports slot was introduced the following month.

Stereo broadcasts debuted on Channel 5 and its sister channels on 1 August 1990.

On 31 August 1992, SBC 5 introduced a two-minute 7 p.m. news bulletin, From The Newsroom, airing on weekdays.

The daily afternoon soap opera in Mandarin, one of the fewest non-English programmes airing on SBC 5, moved to SBC 8 on 7 June 1993.

=== As an all-English channel ===
In September 1993, SBC announced that SBC 5's Malay-language programming would be moved to Channel 12 in order to expand its output in the language, and that SBC 5 would re-launch as an English-language channel. In preparation for the new Channel 5, SBC adopted block programming for the channel, with scheduling based on the lifestyles and preferences of viewers. Monday evenings would be for professionals, managers and executives while Tuesdays are for teenagers and young adults. Lighter shows would air in the 6-8 p.m. slot; I Love Lucy and a game show air every day and weekdays respectively in a stripped format. News programming was realigned, with the new News 5 at Seven, aimed at blue-collar workers and featuring human interest stories, and News 5 Tonight, which resembled the former 9 p.m. news bulletin. On Fridays and Saturdays, two movies were scheduled during prime time; imports with lower ratings expectations were moved to late-night time slots past 11 p.m. Channel 5's new newsroom was built at a cost of S$8 million.

The relaunch occurred at midnight on 1 January 1994, as the culmination of Hi! 5—a New Year's Eve special from Junction 8. The launch would include 35 straight hours of broadcasting, which began on the afternoon of 31 December and concluded after New Year's Day. A Straits Times reporter observed that Channel 5's new on-air presentation, designed by Novocom in Los Angeles (including its new jingle "Where It All Happens", composed by Frank Gari and Danny Pelfrey), made the channel feel more "foreign" and American in style, in contrast to the more multicultural feel SBC 5 had.

On 29 August 1994, the channel launched AM Singapore, Singapore's first English-language breakfast programme. It aired weekdays from 6:00 to 8:30 a.m. SGT. Its initial presenters were Diana Koh and Lance Alexander; the latter who was dispatched from Perfect 10. AM Singapore was promoted aggressively, emphasising on being first with the news. With the launch of AM Singapore, 5 now broadcast for 19 hours a day on weekdays.

On 1 October 1994, SBC was privatised into a new holding company, Singapore International Media (SIM), with four business units: Channel 5 would become a unit of the Television Corporation of Singapore (TCS). Channel 5 replaced its family-friendly programmes (sitcoms such as Boy Meets World, Blossom and Major Dad and drama series such as Homefront and Murder, She Wrote) on Sunday afternoons with action-related programming (the rollerblade game show Blade Warriors, Kung Fu: The Legend Continues and Acapulco H.E.A.T., considered by The Straits Times as a "flesh parade disguised as a drama series") in late 1994 as viewership ratings showed that families would tune in to fast-paced action programmes in the 12pm-3pm slot, an "appreciable rise" according to a Nielsen survey. The mid-late afternoon slot was still dedicated to family-friendly content.

On 29 September 1995, Channel 5 became the second channel in Singapore to begin 24-hour broadcasting. Local programming on Channel 5 during the 6 to 11 pm prime time in the week from 26 June to 2 July 1995 was at 41%, while in March 1996 it was at 37%. In March 1996, much of the slots for local programmes during prime time were replaced with "imported shows". Chicago Hope, which used to air at midnight, moved to prime time, instead of using these slots for repeats of local productions.

The viewership share of Channel 5 according to Nielsen Survey Research Singapore data was at 60% in September 1995, dipping to 57% in February 1996. Channel 5 shuffled most of its programmes to different time slots and days throughout April 1996, prioritising its local programmes than "foreign imports" as TCS has almost reached the aim of 80% local content during prime time. Notably, Murder One which aired at prime time moved to midnight on Wednesdays despite its loyal following.

In 1997, Channel 5 began increasing local production by commissioning programmes from Zhao Wei Films and Canada-based UTV International. By this period, Channel 5 had 40 hours a week of local programming. With the launch of CNA in 1999, the channel cut its news service to one bulletin a day (9:30pm) while increasing its entertainment output during primetime hours.

On 29 January 2000, 5 introduced a new programming block for teenagers called The Tube, airing weekdays from 4 to 6 pm and weekends from 9 to 3 pm.

On 30 April 2001, News 5 Tonight was retooled with a new format, geared towards "young people and people on the streets" with stories relatable to the local audience and irrelevant news removed. This also included a live studio interview session each night. Toh Seh Ling, who was a presenter for "teen" news programme Newswatch in 1990, became its new host. In preparation for the launch of TV Works, and aware that the channel would have a stronger amount of local productions, Channel 5 started airing back-to-back US series in May 2001. However, even such series had a niche audience of around 3% (120,000 viewers).

The broadcast of X-Men on 4 May 2003 gave the channel a record 1.2 million viewers tuning in for its network television premiere. The premiere of local drama Brothers 4 attracted 715,000 viewers on its 9 August premiere, a record for Mediacorp dramas in 2003.

In order to regain its viewership, 5 announced a new schedule in May 2008 with new local programmes. That year, as part of a realignment of Mediacorp's TV output, the channel would increase its local output to include long form drama series and reality shows. The channel would also launch a Mobile 5 service.

On 31 August 2010, 5 had airing a Philippine teleserye produced by ABS-CBN Studios titled Tayong Dalawa, under the title The Two Of Us, whose starred by Kim Chiu, Gerald Anderson, Jake Cuenca and Coco Martin, with English-dubbed, English, Malay and Mandarin-subtitled, and dual-language sound (English and Filipino) option.

On 1 November 2014, 5 announced a planned expansion of local original programming, including more current affairs programming focusing on Singapore (including the weeknight talk show The 5 Show), a "local serial drama", and a new talent search competition.

On 1 May 2019, 5 replaced its daytime simulcasts of CNA with the children's programming block Okto on 5; this service replaced the Okto channel, which was discontinued.

== Programming ==
- List of programmes broadcast by Mediacorp 5
