= 2023 Singapore Grand Prix =

Fifteenth round of the 2023 F1 season

Race 15 of 22 in the 2023 Formula One World Championship
← Previous race	Next race →
- Layout of the Marina Bay Street Circuit

Race details
- Date: 17 September 2023
- Official name: Formula 1 Singapore Airlines Singapore Grand Prix 2023
- Location: Marina Bay Street Circuit; Marina Bay, Singapore
- Course: Temporary street circuit
- Course length: 4.940 km (3.070 miles)
- Distance: 62 laps, 306.143 km (190.228 miles)
- Weather: Clear
- Attendance: 264,108

Pole position
Driver	(Spain) Carlos Sainz Jr.	Ferrari
- Time: 1:30.984

Fastest lap
Driver	(United Kingdom) Lewis Hamilton	Mercedes
- Time: 1:35.867 on lap 47

Podium
First	(Spain) Carlos Sainz Jr.	Ferrari
Second	(United Kingdom) Lando Norris	McLaren-Mercedes
Third	(United Kingdom) Lewis Hamilton	Mercedes

The 2023 Singapore Grand Prix (officially known as the Formula 1 Singapore Airlines Singapore Grand Prix 2023) was a Formula One motor race held on 17 September 2023 at the Marina Bay Street Circuit in Marina Bay, Singapore. It was the fifteenth round of the 2023 Formula One World Championship.

The race began with 19 drivers, following Lance Stroll's crash at the end of Q1, which triggered a red flag. It was won by Carlos Sainz Jr. for the second victory of his Formula One career. Sainz took pole position and led the entire race, finishing ahead of Lando Norris and Lewis Hamilton. For most of the race George Russell was looking at a podium but crashed out on the last lap at turn 10. The Grand Prix was the only race of the 2023 season that was not won by a Red Bull Racing driver; it also ended Max Verstappen's record streak of ten consecutive wins and Red Bull Racing's record streak of fifteen consecutive wins. AlphaTauri driver Liam Lawson scored his first points in Formula One by finishing ninth in the race.

== Background ==
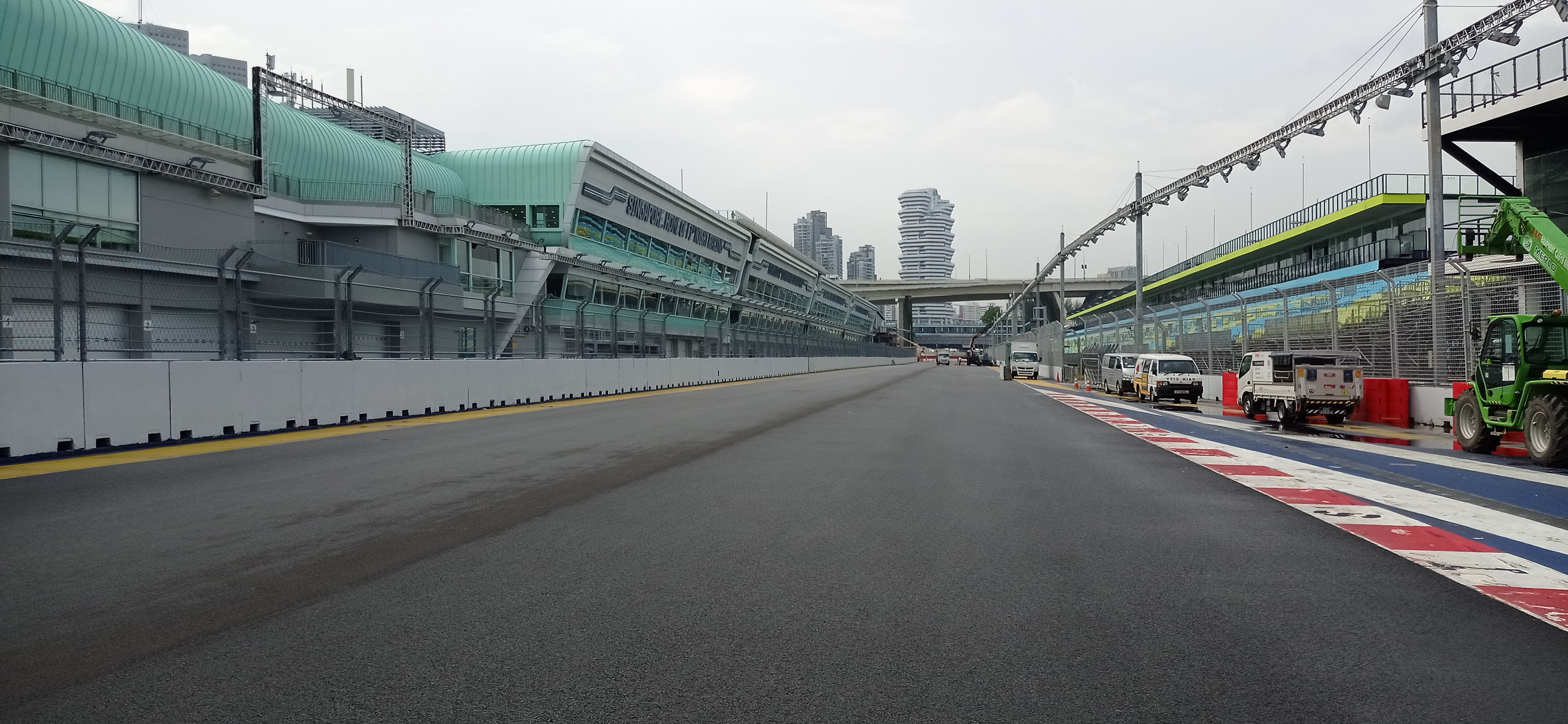
Preparations being made the month prior to the 2023 Singapore Grand Prix

The event was held across the weekend of 15–17 September. It was the fifteenth round of the 2023 Formula One World Championship and the 14th running of the Singapore Grand Prix as a round of the Formula One World Championship.

=== Championship standings before the race ===
Coming into the weekend, Max Verstappen led the Drivers' Championship by 145 points from teammate Sergio Pérez, with Fernando Alonso third, a further 49 points behind. Red Bull Racing led the Constructors' Championship, leading Mercedes by 310 points and Ferrari by a further 45 points.

Current World Constructors' Championship leader Red Bull Racing had an opportunity to secure their sixth title, their second in a row. Red Bull Racing would win the title if they claimed a 1–2 result with a bonus point for the fastest lap (44 points), with second-placed Mercedes scoring one point or fewer. If Red Bull Racing had achieved a 1–2 without the fastest lap (43 points), with Mercedes failing to score, their advantage would have been the same as the number of the obtainable points remaining in the season (353), but Mercedes would not have been able to win on a tie breaker due to Red Bull Racing achieving more wins than Mercedes.

=== Entrants ===
The drivers and teams were initially the same as the season entry list, with the exception of Liam Lawson, who was in the seat originally held by Nyck de Vries. (Note: Nyck de Vries was originally replaced by Daniel Ricciardo from the Hungarian Grand Prix onwards. Ricciardo was subsequently replaced by Liam Lawson whilst Ricciardo recovered from a broken metacarpal bone which he suffered following a crash during the second practice of the Dutch Grand Prix.) Lance Stroll withdrew before the race following a crash in qualifying.

=== Tyre choices ===
Tyre supplier Pirelli brought the C3, C4 and C5 tyre compounds (designated hard, medium, and soft, respectively) for teams to use at the event.

=== Track changes ===
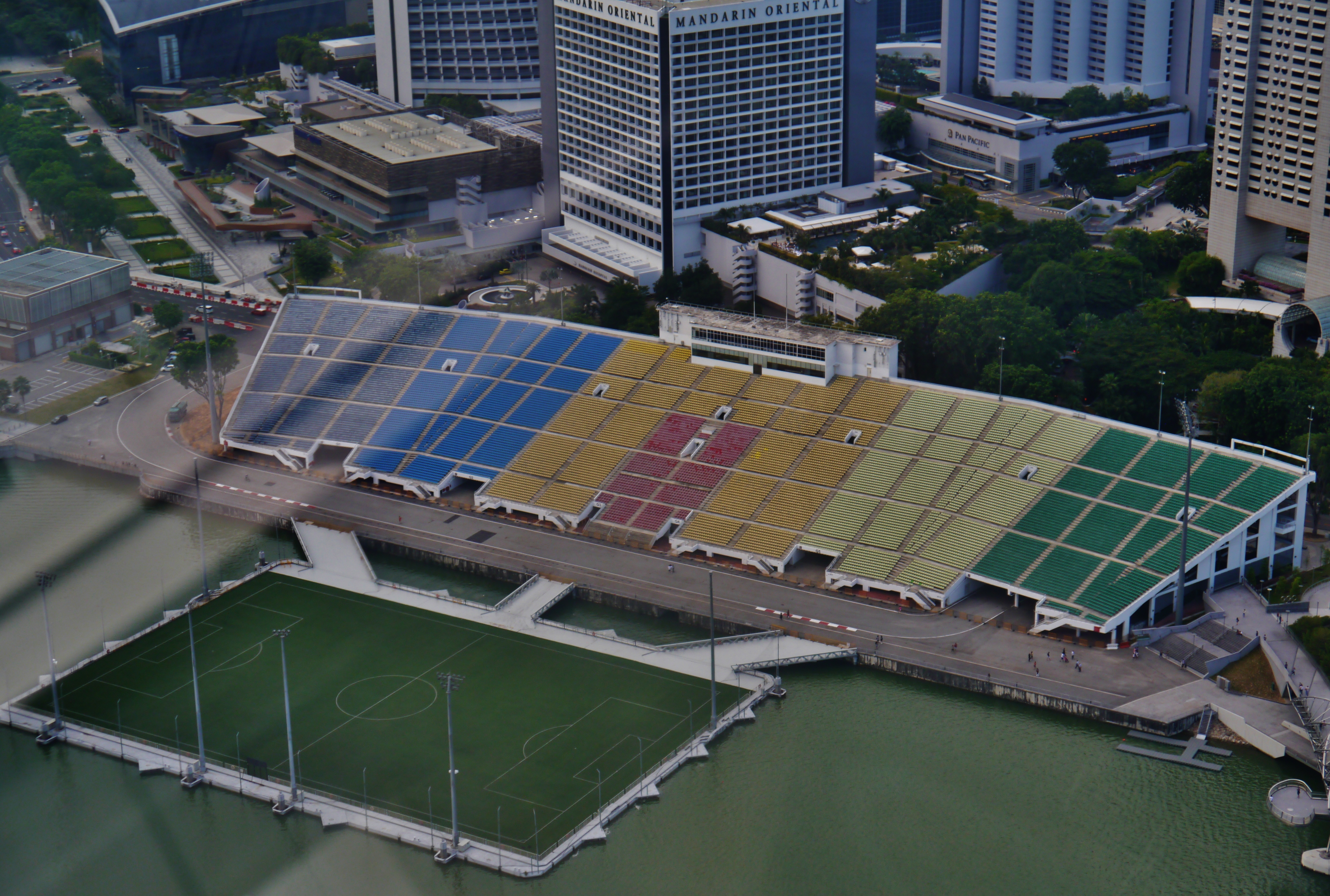
The (top) previous layout of the circuit went through (bottom) The Float @ Marina Bay.

Turns 16 through 19 of the previous layout were removed to facilitate the construction of NS Square, which is replacing The Float @ Marina Bay where the track previously went through. They were replaced by a new straight leading from turn 15 to the new turn 16, which was designated as turn 20 in the previous layout.

== Practice ==
Three free practice sessions were held for the event. The first practice session was held on 15 September 2023, at 17:30 local time (UTC+8). Charles Leclerc topped the session, with his teammate Carlos Sainz Jr. recording the second-fastest time and Max Verstappen recording the third-fastest.

The second practice session was held on 15 September 2023, at 21:00 local time (UTC+8). Carlos Sainz Jr. topped the session, with his teammate Charles Leclerc recording the second-fastest time and George Russell recording the third-fastest. Alexander Albon reported engine issues during the session, and he was forced to sit out for the rest of the practice. The third practice session was held on 16 September 2023, at 17:00 local time (UTC+8). Carlos Sainz Jr. topped the session, with George Russell recording the second-fastest time and Lando Norris recording the third-fastest.

== Qualifying ==
Qualifying was held on 16 September 2023, at 21:00 local time (UTC+8).

=== Qualifying report ===
The first session saw Yuki Tsunoda record the fastest time ahead of Sergio Pérez and Nico Hülkenberg after a heavy crash for Lance Stroll brought out the red flag in the closing moments, taking himself, Valtteri Bottas, Oscar Piastri, Logan Sargeant and Zhou Guanyu out of qualifying. The second session was delayed due to debris on the final corner where Stroll had crashed. Following the session, Stroll was taken to the circuit medical centre and was deemed fit to race, but withdrew from the event.

The second segment saw Carlos Sainz Jr. top the session ahead of George Russell and Fernando Alonso. Pierre Gasly, Alexander Albon and Tsunoda were all knocked out of the session, but most notably, the Red Bulls of Max Verstappen and his teammate Pérez were both knocked out in this session. Liam Lawson beat Verstappen to the line and into Q3 – Lawson's first – by a gap of 0.007 seconds. This is Red Bull Racing's first double Q2 exit since the 2018 Russian Grand Prix.

The third segment saw Sainz take pole position ahead of Russell and Charles Leclerc, his and Ferrari's second consecutive after the preceding Italian Grand Prix.

Following qualifying, Max Verstappen and Logan Sargeant were given reprimands for various impeding incidents. Prior to the following Japanese Grand Prix the FIA stated that not giving either of the drivers grid penalties for their offences had been a mistake.

=== Qualifying classification ===
Pos.	No.	Driver	Constructor	Qualifying times			Final grid
Pos.	No.	Driver	Constructor	Q1	Q2	Q3	Final grid
1	55	(Spain) Carlos Sainz Jr.	Ferrari	1:32.339	1:31.439	1:30.984	1
2	63	(United Kingdom) George Russell	Mercedes	1:32.331	1:31.743	1:31.056	2
3	16	(Monaco) Charles Leclerc	Ferrari	1:32.406	1:32.012	1:31.063	3
4	4	(United Kingdom) Lando Norris	McLaren-Mercedes	1:32.483	1:31.951	1:31.270	4
5	44	(United Kingdom) Lewis Hamilton	Mercedes	1:32.651	1:32.019	1:31.485	5
6	20	(Denmark) Kevin Magnussen	Haas-Ferrari	1:32.242	1:31.892	1:31.575	6
7	14	(Spain) Fernando Alonso	Aston Martin Aramco-Mercedes	1:32.584	1:31.835	1:31.615	7
8	31	(France) Esteban Ocon	Alpine-Renault	1:32.369	1:32.089	1:31.673	8
9	27	(Germany) Nico Hülkenberg	Haas-Ferrari	1:32.100	1:31.994	1:31.808	9
10	40	(New Zealand) Liam Lawson	AlphaTauri-Honda RBPT	1:32.215	1:32.166	1:32.268	10
11	1	(Netherlands) Max Verstappen	Red Bull Racing-Honda RBPT	1:32.398	1:32.173	N/A	11
12	10	(France) Pierre Gasly	Alpine-Renault	1:32.452	1:32.274	N/A	12
13	11	(Mexico) Sergio Pérez	Red Bull Racing-Honda RBPT	1:32.099	1:32.310	N/A	13
14	23	(Thailand) Alexander Albon	Williams-Mercedes	1:32.668	1:33.719	N/A	14
15	22	(Japan) Yuki Tsunoda	AlphaTauri-Honda RBPT	1:31.991	No time	N/A	15
16	77	(Finland) Valtteri Bottas	Alfa Romeo-Ferrari	1:32.809	N/A	N/A	16
17	81	(Australia) Oscar Piastri	McLaren-Mercedes	1:32.902	N/A	N/A	17
18	2	(United States) Logan Sargeant	Williams-Mercedes	1:33.252	N/A	N/A	18
19	24	(China) Zhou Guanyu	Alfa Romeo-Ferrari	1:33.258	N/A	N/A	PL^{a}
20	18	(Canada) Lance Stroll	Aston Martin Aramco-Mercedes	1:33.397	N/A	N/A	—^{b}
107% time: 1:38.430

Notes

- ^a – Zhou Guanyu qualified 19th, but he was required to start the race from the pit lane as the car was fitted with new power unit elements without the approval of the technical delegate during parc fermé.
- ^b – Lance Stroll qualified 20th, but he withdrew following a crash in the session.

== Race ==
The race was held on 17 September 2023, at 20:00 local time (UTC+8).

=== Race report ===
Zhou Guanyu started the race from the pit lane due to power unit changes. As the race began, Carlos Sainz Jr. kept the lead while teammate Charles Leclerc, starting on the soft tyres, jumped ahead of George Russell to take second place. Meanwhile, Russell's teammate Lewis Hamilton took the turn 1 run-off, gained two places on Lando Norris and George Russell and was noted by the stewards for gaining an advantage, so he gave the position back to Russell and Norris.

Having made contact with Sergio Pérez, Yuki Tsunoda suffered a puncture early in the race and retired on lap one due to damage to his sidepods. He safely parked his car behind the barriers. His retirement triggered a yellow flag for a brief time period. Not long afterward, Logan Sargeant crashed into a barrier and broke his front wing. He returned to the pit lane while his car spewed debris onto the track, triggering a safety car. Red Bull Racing chose not to pit their drivers during the safety car period, meaning both were running older hard tyres at the restart. Russell, Norris and Hamilton were thus able to pass Pérez and Max Verstappen, who were both struggling due to their older tyres. After dropping track position, Verstappen and Pérez came into the pits, coming out in fifteenth and eighteenth respectively, but recovered to fifth and eighth respectively. The race resumed with Sainz holding his pace at the front. A few laps later, Esteban Ocon stopped on track with a gearbox issue, triggering a virtual safety car. Mercedes took advantage of this to double-stack their drivers in the pits for new medium tires. Fernando Alonso, who had received a penalty during the earlier safety car period due to crossing the pit entry line, had a slow stop, leaving him last. Russell and Hamilton both passed Leclerc to claim third and fourth respectively.

As the race entered its closing stages, Sainz strategically allowed Norris, running in second place, to remain in range for DRS. The DRS benefit made it harder for Russell and Hamilton (third and fourth) to overtake Norris and challenge Sainz for the lead. On the final lap, Russell clipped the wall and broke his suspension, causing him to slam into the wall at turn 10 and ending his podium hopes. Norris had clipped the same wall just before Russell's crash but his car was undamaged. Having led the entire race, Sainz won the race, his first since the 2022 British Grand Prix and Ferrari's first since the 2022 Austrian Grand Prix, breaking Verstappen and Red Bull Racing's winning streak, with Norris claiming second place and Hamilton claiming third place after Russell's crash. In only his third race in Formula One, Liam Lawson scored his maiden points by finishing ninth, driving for AlphaTauri. Hamilton's finishing third and Alonso's fifteenth place meant Hamilton moved up from fourth to third in the championship. Max Verstappen's fifth-place finish would mark the only race where he would not finish on podium for the entire 2023 season.

=== Race classification ===
Pos.	No.	Driver	Constructor	Laps	Time/Retired	Grid	Points
1	55	(Spain) Carlos Sainz Jr.	Ferrari	62	1:46:37.418	1	25
2	4	(United Kingdom) Lando Norris	McLaren-Mercedes	62	+0.812	4	18
3	44	(United Kingdom) Lewis Hamilton	Mercedes	62	+1.269	5	16^{a}
4	16	(Monaco) Charles Leclerc	Ferrari	62	+21.177	3	12
5	1	(Netherlands) Max Verstappen	Red Bull Racing-Honda RBPT	62	+21.441	11	10
6	10	(France) Pierre Gasly	Alpine-Renault	62	+38.441	12	8
7	81	(Australia) Oscar Piastri	McLaren-Mercedes	62	+41.479	17	6
8	11	(Mexico) Sergio Pérez	Red Bull Racing-Honda RBPT	62	+59.534^{b}	13	4
9	40	(New Zealand) Liam Lawson	AlphaTauri-Honda RBPT	62	+1:05.918	10	2
10	20	(Denmark) Kevin Magnussen	Haas-Ferrari	62	+1:12.116	6	1
11	23	(Thailand) Alexander Albon	Williams-Mercedes	62	+1:13.417	14	
12	24	(China) Zhou Guanyu	Alfa Romeo-Ferrari	62	+1:23.649	PL	
13	27	(Germany) Nico Hülkenberg	Haas-Ferrari	62	+1:26.201	9	
14	2	(United States) Logan Sargeant	Williams-Mercedes	62	+1:26.889	18	
15	14	(Spain) Fernando Alonso	Aston Martin Aramco-Mercedes	62	+1:27.603	7	
16^{c}	63	(United Kingdom) George Russell	Mercedes	61	Accident	2	
Ret	77	(Finland) Valtteri Bottas	Alfa Romeo-Ferrari	51	Hydraulics	16	
Ret	31	(France) Esteban Ocon	Alpine-Renault	42	Gearbox	8	
Ret	22	(Japan) Yuki Tsunoda	AlphaTauri-Honda RBPT	0	Collision damage	15	
WD	18	(Canada) Lance Stroll	Aston Martin Aramco-Mercedes	0	Qualifying accident	—^{d}	
Fastest lap: (United Kingdom) Lewis Hamilton (Mercedes) – 1:35.867 (lap 47)

Notes

- ^a – Includes one point for fastest lap.
- ^b – Sergio Pérez received a five-second time penalty for causing a collision with Alexander Albon. His final position was not affected by the penalty.
- ^c – George Russell was classified as he completed more than 90% of the race distance.
- ^d – Lance Stroll did not start the race following his withdrawal due to a crash in qualifying.

== Championship standings after the race ==
Drivers' Championship standings

	Pos.	Driver	Points
	1	(Netherlands) Max Verstappen*	374
	2	(Mexico) Sergio Pérez*	223
1	3	(United Kingdom) Lewis Hamilton	180
1	4	(Spain) Fernando Alonso	170
	5	(Spain) Carlos Sainz Jr.	142

Constructors' Championship standings

Pos.	Constructor	Points
1	(Austria) Red Bull Racing-Honda RBPT*	597
2	(Germany) Mercedes*	289
3	(Italy) Ferrari*	265
4	(United Kingdom) Aston Martin Aramco-Mercedes	217
5	(United Kingdom) McLaren-Mercedes	139

- Note: Only the top five positions are included for both sets of standings.

== Notes ==
Previous race: 2023 Italian Grand Prix	FIA Formula One World Championship; 2023 season	Next race: 2023 Japanese Grand Prix
Previous race: 2022 Singapore Grand Prix	Singapore Grand Prix	Next race: 2024 Singapore Grand Prix
