= 2018 Singapore Grand Prix =

2018 edition of Singapore Grand Prix

Race 15 of 21 in the 2018 Formula One World Championship
← Previous race	Next race →
- Layout of the Marina Bay Street Circuit

Race details
- Date: 16 September 2018
- Official name: Formula 1 2018 Singapore Airlines Singapore Grand Prix
- Location: Marina Bay Street Circuit; Marina Bay, Singapore
- Course: Temporary street circuit
- Course length: 5.063 km (3.146 miles)
- Distance: 61 laps, 308.706 km (191.821 miles)
- Weather: Clear
- Attendance: 263,000

Pole position
Driver	(United Kingdom) Lewis Hamilton	Mercedes
- Time: 1:36.015

Fastest lap
Driver	(Denmark) Kevin Magnussen	Haas-Ferrari
- Time: 1:41.905 on lap 50 (lap record)

Podium
First	(United Kingdom) Lewis Hamilton	Mercedes
Second	(Netherlands) Max Verstappen	Red Bull Racing-TAG Heuer
Third	(Germany) Sebastian Vettel	Ferrari

The 2018 Singapore Grand Prix (officially the Formula 1 2018 Singapore Airlines Singapore Grand Prix) was a Formula One motor race held on 16 September 2018 at the Marina Bay Street Circuit in Marina Bay, Singapore. The race was the 15th round of the 2018 Formula One World Championship and marked the 19th running of the Singapore Grand Prix and the 11th time the race had been held at Marina Bay.

Lewis Hamilton won the race from pole position to further extend his championship lead, ahead of Max Verstappen and Sebastian Vettel.

== Background ==
=== Championship standings before the race ===
Mercedes driver Lewis Hamilton entered the round with a 30-point lead over Sebastian Vettel in the Drivers' Championship. In the World Constructors' Championship, Mercedes led Ferrari by 25 points.

=== Tyres ===
The tyre compounds provided for this race were the hypersoft, ultrasoft and soft.

== Qualifying ==
Pos.	No.	Driver	Constructor	Qualifying times			Final grid
Pos.	No.	Driver	Constructor	Q1	Q2	Q3	Final grid
1	44	(United Kingdom) Lewis Hamilton	Mercedes	1:39.403	1:37.344	1:36.015	1
2	33	(Netherlands) Max Verstappen	Red Bull Racing-TAG Heuer	1:38.751	1:37.214	1:36.334	2
3	5	(Germany) Sebastian Vettel	Ferrari	1:38.218	1:37.876	1:36.628	3
4	77	(Finland) Valtteri Bottas	Mercedes	1:39.291	1:37.254	1:36.702	4
5	7	(Finland) Kimi Räikkönen	Ferrari	1:38.534	1:37.194	1:36.794	5
6	3	(Australia) Daniel Ricciardo	Red Bull Racing-TAG Heuer	1:38.153	1:37.406	1:36.996	6
7	11	(Mexico) Sergio Pérez	Racing Point Force India-Mercedes	1:38.814	1:38.342	1:37.985	7
8	8	(France) Romain Grosjean	Haas-Ferrari	1:38.685	1:38.367	1:38.320	8
9	31	(France) Esteban Ocon	Racing Point Force India-Mercedes	1:38.912	1:38.534	1:38.365	9
10	27	(Germany) Nico Hülkenberg	Renault	1:38.932	1:38.450	1:38.588	10
11	14	(Spain) Fernando Alonso	McLaren-Renault	1:39.022	1:38.641		11
12	55	(Spain) Carlos Sainz Jr.	Renault	1:39.103	1:38.716		12
13	16	(Monaco) Charles Leclerc	Sauber-Ferrari	1:39.206	1:38.747		13
14	9	(Sweden) Marcus Ericsson	Sauber-Ferrari	1:39.366	1:39.453		14
15	10	(France) Pierre Gasly	Scuderia Toro Rosso-Honda	1:39.614	1:39.691		15
16	20	(Denmark) Kevin Magnussen	Haas-Ferrari	1:39.644			16
17	28	(New Zealand) Brendon Hartley	Scuderia Toro Rosso-Honda	1:39.809			17
18	2	(Belgium) Stoffel Vandoorne	McLaren-Renault	1:39.864			18
19	35	(Russia) Sergey Sirotkin	Williams-Mercedes	1:41.263			19
20	18	(Canada) Lance Stroll	Williams-Mercedes	1:41.334			20
107% time: 1:45.023

== Race ==
Lewis Hamilton won the race to further strengthen his lead in the Championship after Vettel finished 3rd, thus losing further ground to Hamilton, Max Verstappen managed 2nd place. On the first lap with the two Force India cars colliding with Esteban Ocon ending up in the wall after hitting his teammate Pérez, bringing out the Safety Car. Kevin Magnussen achieved his first fastest lap, the first for a Danish driver and for his team, Haas.

=== Race classification ===
Pos.	No.	Driver	Constructor	Laps	Time/Retired	Grid	Points
1	44	(United Kingdom) Lewis Hamilton	Mercedes	61	1:51:11.611	1	25
2	33	(Netherlands) Max Verstappen	Red Bull Racing-TAG Heuer	61	+8.961	2	18
3	5	(Germany) Sebastian Vettel	Ferrari	61	+39.945	3	15
4	77	(Finland) Valtteri Bottas	Mercedes	61	+51.930	4	12
5	7	(Finland) Kimi Räikkönen	Ferrari	61	+53.001	5	10
6	3	(Australia) Daniel Ricciardo	Red Bull Racing-TAG Heuer	61	+53.982	6	8
7	14	(Spain) Fernando Alonso	McLaren-Renault	61	+1:43.011	11	6
8	55	(Spain) Carlos Sainz Jr.	Renault	60	+1 lap	12	4
9	16	(Monaco) Charles Leclerc	Sauber-Ferrari	60	+1 lap	13	2
10	27	(Germany) Nico Hülkenberg	Renault	60	+1 lap	10	1
11	9	(Sweden) Marcus Ericsson	Sauber-Ferrari	60	+1 lap	14	
12	2	(Belgium) Stoffel Vandoorne	McLaren-Renault	60	+1 lap	18	
13	10	(France) Pierre Gasly	Scuderia Toro Rosso-Honda	60	+1 lap	15	
14	18	(Canada) Lance Stroll	Williams-Mercedes	60	+1 lap	20	
15	8	(France) Romain Grosjean	Haas-Ferrari	60	+1 lap^{1}	8	
16	11	(Mexico) Sergio Pérez	Racing Point Force India-Mercedes	60	+1 lap	7	
17	28	(New Zealand) Brendon Hartley	Scuderia Toro Rosso-Honda	60	+1 lap	17	
18	20	(Denmark) Kevin Magnussen	Haas-Ferrari	59	+2 laps	16	
19	35	(Russia) Sergey Sirotkin	Williams-Mercedes	59	+2 laps	19	
Ret	31	(France) Esteban Ocon	Racing Point Force India-Mercedes	0	Collision	9	

Notes

- ^1 – Romain Grosjean received a 5-second time penalty for ignoring blue flags.

== Championship standings after the race ==
Drivers' Championship standings

Pos.	Driver	Points
1	(United Kingdom) Lewis Hamilton	281
2	(Germany) Sebastian Vettel	241
3	(Finland) Kimi Räikkönen	174
4	(Finland) Valtteri Bottas	171
5	(Netherlands) Max Verstappen	148

Constructors' Championship standings

Pos.	Constructor	Points
1	(Germany) Mercedes	452
2	(Italy) Ferrari	415
3	(Austria) Red Bull Racing-TAG Heuer	274
4	(France) Renault	91
5	(United States) Haas-Ferrari	76

- Note: Only the top five positions are included for both sets of standings.

Previous race: 2018 Italian Grand Prix	FIA Formula One World Championship; 2018 season	Next race: 2018 Russian Grand Prix
Previous race: 2017 Singapore Grand Prix	Singapore Grand Prix	Next race: 2019 Singapore Grand Prix
