= 2018 Italian Grand Prix =

Race 14 of 21 in the 2018 Formula One World Championship
← Previous race	Next race →
- Layout of the Monza circuit

Race details
- Date: 2 September 2018
- Official name: Formula 1 Gran Premio Heineken d'Italia 2018
- Location: Autodromo Nazionale di Monza; Monza, Italy
- Course: Permanent racing facility
- Course length: 5.793 km (3.600 miles)
- Distance: 53 laps, 306.720 km (190.587 miles)
- Weather: Sunny

Pole position
Driver	(Finland) Kimi Räikkönen	Ferrari
- Time: 1:19.119

Fastest lap
Driver	(United Kingdom) Lewis Hamilton	Mercedes
- Time: 1:22.497 on lap 30

Podium
First	(United Kingdom) Lewis Hamilton	Mercedes
Second	(Finland) Kimi Räikkönen	Ferrari
Third	(Finland) Valtteri Bottas	Mercedes

The 2018 Italian Grand Prix (formally the Formula 1 Gran Premio Heineken d'Italia 2018) was a Formula One motor race held on 2 September 2018 at the Autodromo Nazionale di Monza in Monza, Italy. The race was the fourteenth round of the 2018 Formula One World Championship and marked the 88th running of the Italian Grand Prix and the 83rd time the race was held at Monza.

Mercedes driver Lewis Hamilton entered the round with a 17-point lead over Sebastian Vettel in the Drivers' Championship. In the World Constructors' Championship, Mercedes led Ferrari by 15 points. Kimi Räikkönen took the fastest pole position in Formula 1 history with an average speed of 263.588 km/h (163.786 mph), breaking the record set by Rubens Barrichello in 2004. Räikkönen's previous pole was at the 2017 Monaco Grand Prix.

== Qualifying ==
Pos.	No.	Driver	Constructor	Qualifying times			Final grid
Pos.	No.	Driver	Constructor	Q1	Q2	Q3	Final grid
1	7	(Finland) Kimi Räikkönen	Ferrari	1:20.722	1:19.846	1:19.119	1
2	5	(Germany) Sebastian Vettel	Ferrari	1:20.542	1:19.629	1:19.280	2
3	44	(United Kingdom) Lewis Hamilton	Mercedes	1:20.810	1:19.798	1:19.294	3
4	77	(Finland) Valtteri Bottas	Mercedes	1:21.381	1:20.427	1:19.656	4
5	33	(Netherlands) Max Verstappen	Red Bull Racing-TAG Heuer	1:21.381	1:20.333	1:20.615	5
6	8	(France) Romain Grosjean	Haas-Ferrari	1:21.887	1:21.239	1:20.936	6
7	55	(Spain) Carlos Sainz Jr.	Renault	1:21.732	1:21.552	1:21.041	7
8	31	(France) Esteban Ocon	Racing Point Force India-Mercedes	1:21.570	1:21.315	1:21.099	8
9	10	(France) Pierre Gasly	Scuderia Toro Rosso-Honda	1:21.834	1:21.667	1:21.350	9
10	18	(Canada) Lance Stroll	Williams-Mercedes	1:21.838	1:21.494	1:21.627	10
11	20	(Denmark) Kevin Magnussen	Haas-Ferrari	1:21.783	1:21.669		11
12	35	(Russia) Sergey Sirotkin	Williams-Mercedes	1:21.813	1:21.732		12
13	14	(Spain) Fernando Alonso	McLaren-Renault	1:21.850	1:22.568		13
14	27	(Germany) Nico Hülkenberg	Renault	1:21.801	No time		20^{1}
15	3	(Australia) Daniel Ricciardo	Red Bull Racing-TAG Heuer	1:21.280	No time		19^{2}
16	11	(Mexico) Sergio Pérez	Racing Point Force India-Mercedes	1:21.888			14
17	16	(Monaco) Charles Leclerc	Sauber-Ferrari	1:21.889			15
18	28	(New Zealand) Brendon Hartley	Scuderia Toro Rosso-Honda	1:21.934			16
19	9	(Sweden) Marcus Ericsson	Sauber-Ferrari	1:22.048			18^{3}
20	2	(Belgium) Stoffel Vandoorne	McLaren-Renault	1:22.085			17
107% time: 1:26.179

Notes

- ^1 – Nico Hülkenberg received a 40-place grid penalty: 10 places for causing a collision at previous round and 30 places for exceeding his quota of power unit elements.
- ^2 – Daniel Ricciardo received a 30-place grid penalty for exceeding his quota of power unit elements.
- ^3 – Marcus Ericsson received a 10-place grid penalty for exceeding his quota of power unit elements.

== Race report ==
The race was won by Lewis Hamilton after a battle with Kimi Räikkönen, Hamilton caught and passed Räikkönen with 9 laps remaining. On the opening lap Hamilton and Vettel collided causing Vettel to spin off. Despite Vettel's complaints, the stewards deemed it just a racing incident. Vettel would later fight back to 4th place, behind Valtteri Bottas in third. Max Verstappen was penalised 5 seconds after forcing Bottas off the track after a pit stop and was classified 5th. Sergey Sirotkin, driving for Williams, scored his only Formula 1 championship point, after Romain Grosjean was disqualified from 6th place after Renault successfully lodged a protest due to his Haas carrying an illegal floor, thus ensuring that for the first time ever in Formula One, all drivers who entered and finished every race in the season scored at least a point.

=== Race classification ===
Pos.	No.	Driver	Constructor	Laps	Time/Retired	Grid	Points
1	44	(United Kingdom) Lewis Hamilton	Mercedes	53	1:16:54.484	3	25
2	7	(Finland) Kimi Räikkönen	Ferrari	53	+8.705	1	18
3	77	(Finland) Valtteri Bottas	Mercedes	53	+14.066	4	15
4	5	(Germany) Sebastian Vettel	Ferrari	53	+16.151	2	12
5	33	(Netherlands) Max Verstappen	Red Bull Racing-TAG Heuer	53	+18.208^{1}	5	10
6	31	(France) Esteban Ocon	Racing Point Force India-Mercedes	53	+57.761	8	8
7	11	(Mexico) Sergio Pérez	Racing Point Force India-Mercedes	53	+58.678	14	6
8	55	(Spain) Carlos Sainz Jr.	Renault	53	+1:18.140	7	4
9	18	(Canada) Lance Stroll	Williams-Mercedes	52	+1 lap	10	2
10	35	(Russia) Sergey Sirotkin	Williams-Mercedes	52	+1 lap	12	1
11	16	(Monaco) Charles Leclerc	Sauber-Ferrari	52	+1 lap	15	
12	2	(Belgium) Stoffel Vandoorne	McLaren-Renault	52	+1 lap	17	
13	27	(Germany) Nico Hülkenberg	Renault	52	+1 lap	20	
14	10	(France) Pierre Gasly	Scuderia Toro Rosso-Honda	52	+1 lap	9	
15	9	(Sweden) Marcus Ericsson	Sauber-Ferrari	52	+1 lap	18	
16	20	(Denmark) Kevin Magnussen	Haas-Ferrari	52	+1 lap	11	
Ret	3	(Australia) Daniel Ricciardo	Red Bull Racing-TAG Heuer	23	Clutch	19	
Ret	14	(Spain) Fernando Alonso	McLaren-Renault	9	Electrics	13	
Ret	28	(New Zealand) Brendon Hartley	Scuderia Toro Rosso-Honda	0	Collision	16	
DSQ	8	(France) Romain Grosjean	Haas-Ferrari	53	Illegal floor^{2}	6	

Notes

- ^1 – Max Verstappen originally finished third, but received a 5-second time penalty for causing a collision with Valtteri Bottas.
- ^2 – Romain Grosjean originally finished sixth, but was disqualified for a technical infringement with the floor of his car.

== Championship standings after the race ==
Drivers' Championship standings

Pos.	Driver	Points
1	(United Kingdom) Lewis Hamilton	256
2	(Germany) Sebastian Vettel	226
3	(Finland) Kimi Räikkönen	164
4	(Finland) Valtteri Bottas	159
5	(Netherlands) Max Verstappen	130

Constructors' Championship standings

Pos.	Constructor	Points
1	(Germany) Mercedes	415
2	(Italy) Ferrari	390
3	(Austria) Red Bull Racing-TAG Heuer	248
4	(France) Renault	86
5	(United States) Haas-Ferrari	76

- Note: Only the top five positions are included for both sets of standings.

== See also ==
- 2018 Monza Formula 2 round
- 2018 Monza GP3 Series round

Previous race: 2018 Belgian Grand Prix	FIA Formula One World Championship; 2018 season	Next race: 2018 Singapore Grand Prix
Previous race: 2017 Italian Grand Prix	Italian Grand Prix	Next race: 2019 Italian Grand Prix
