= 1966 Singapore Grand Prix =

Motor racing event

Circuit layout of the Thomson Road Circuit

The inaugural Singapore Grand Prix was held from 9 to 11 April 1966, on the Thomson Road Grand Prix circuit. Previous editions of the Grand Prix were held before Singapore gained its independence, and were not called Singapore Grand Prix. The 1965 Malaysian Grand Prix was held on the same course, as part of the Malaysian Grand Prix event, as the 1966 Grand Prix of Singapore.

== Results ==
1966 1ST SINGAPORE GRAND PRIX Thomson Road Grand Prix circuit

9–11 April 1966

Singapore GP
MOTORCYCLE GRAND PRIX			60 laps	
Rank	Rider	Country	Motorcycle	Time
1.	Mitsuo Itoh	Japan	Suzuki 125	2h 37min 16.6s
SPORTS CAR & GT CARS RACE			15 laps	
Rank	Driver	Country	Car	Time
1.	Lee Han Seng	Singapore	Lotus-Ford Twin Cam	39min 13.3s
SPORTS CAR & GT CARS RACE			15 laps	
Rank	Driver	Country	Car	Time
1.	Albert Poon	Hong Kong	Lotus Cortina 1500	39min 13.3s
SINGAPORE GRAND PRIX			60 laps	
Rank	Driver	Country	Car	Time
1.	Lee Han Seng	Singapore	Lotus 22	2h 29min41.8s

== See also ==
- 2008 Singapore Grand Prix, the first modern Singapore GP, and first F1 GP in Singapore
- 1999 Malaysian Grand Prix, the first F1 GP in Malaysia

Preceded by None	Singapore Grand Prix; 1966	Succeeded by 1967 Singapore Grand Prix
