= Drag reduction system =

Driver adjustable bodywork

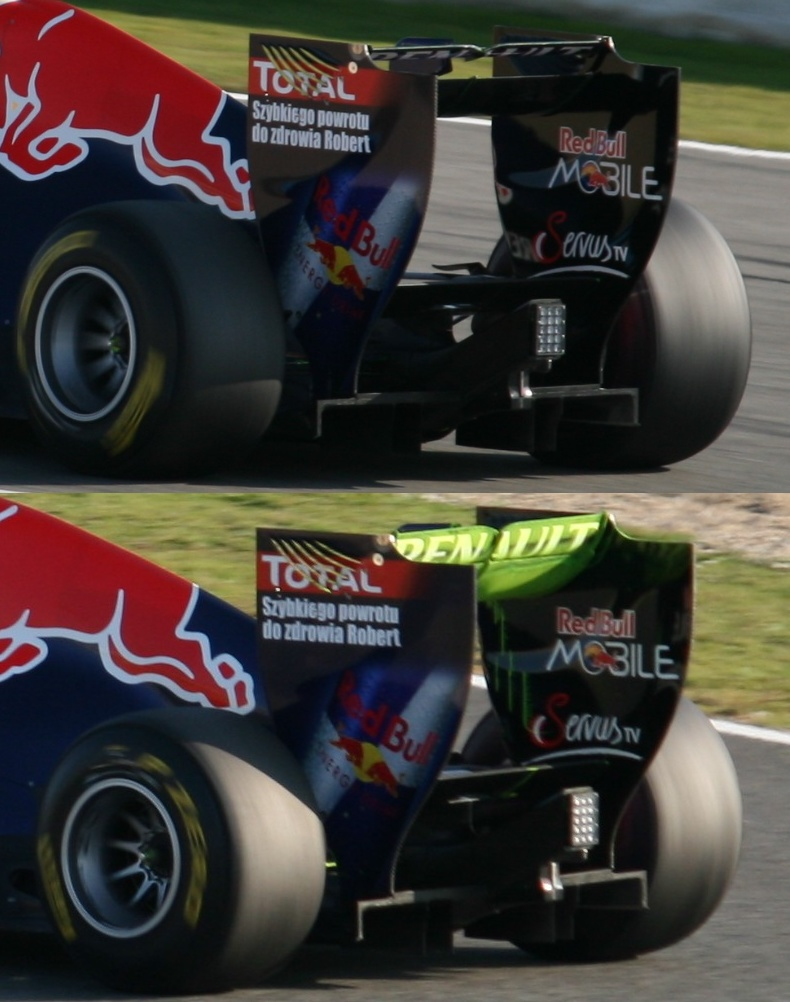
DRS in open (top) and closed (bottom) positions on a Red Bull RB7 in 2011

In motor racing, the drag reduction system (DRS) is a form of driver-adjustable bodywork aimed at reducing aerodynamic drag in order to increase top speed and promote overtaking. It is an adjustable rear wing of the car, which moves in response to driver commands. DRS often comes with conditions, such as the requirement in Formula 1 that the pursuing car must be within one second (when both cars cross the detection point) for DRS to be activated.

DRS was used in Formula One from 2011 to 2025, with Jenson Button and Andrea Kimi Antonelli being the first and the last to use it, respectively. Additionally, Fernando Alonso and Lance Stroll performed the first and the last successful overtake with DRS, respectively. The use of DRS was an exception to the rule banning any moving parts whose primary purpose is to affect the aerodynamics of the car. The system is also used in the Formula Renault 3.5 from 2012 until it folded in 2017, Deutsche Tourenwagen Masters since 2013, GP2 Series later FIA Formula 2 Championship since 2015, GP3 Series later FIA Formula 3 Championship since 2017. An adjustable wing was also used by the Nissan DeltaWing at the 2012 24 Hours of Le Mans, although with free usage.

DRS was removed from Formula One for the 2026 season, and was replaced with an "active aerodynamics" system under the new 2026 regulations.

== Rationale ==
In most higher-performance racing categories, the cars depend on the downforce produced by their aerodynamic bodywork to increase cornering speeds. However, the aerodynamic bodywork, particularly wings, has the side effect of producing turbulence in the region behind the vehicle. The following car's front wing will work less effectively in the turbulent airflow, meaning that the following car's cornering performance is compromised.

By contrast, in circuit racing categories where downforce is less of a factor (for example, NASCAR), the following car has an aerodynamic advantage, because of the aerodynamic drag reduction from drafting and little or no effect on cornering performance.

The net effect is to make overtaking much more difficult, and thus infrequent, in categories with high levels of downforce, making the sport less interesting to spectators.

== Formula One ==
In Formula One, the DRS opened an adjustable flap on the rear wing of the car, in order to reduce drag, thus giving a pursuing car an overtaking advantage over the car in front. The FIA estimate the speed increase to be 10–12 km/h (6.2–7.5 mph) by the end of the activation zone, while others, such as technical staff at racecar-engineering.com, cite a much lower figure of 4–5 km/h (2.5–3.1 mph). When the DRS is deactivated or closed, it increases downforce, giving better cornering.

Between 2011 and 2023, the device could only be used during a race after two racing laps had been completed, and when the pursuing car entered a designated "activation" zone defined by the FIA. This also included having to wait 2 laps after a safety car restart. In 2024 the rule was changed and now the device can be used during a race after only one racing lap after the race start or a safety car restart has been completed.

In 2011, the FIA increased the number of DRS zones to two on some circuits featuring multiple long straights. In Valencia and in Montreal, two zones were endorsed on consecutive long straights, while in Monza and in Buddh, two zones were created on separate parts of the circuit. Two zones had originally been planned for every race with multiple long straights from Montreal onwards (depending on Montreal/Valencia success), but this was not implemented. However, at the penultimate round of the 2011 season, two zones on consecutive long straights saw a return at Yas Marina.

When usage of the DRS remained legal for the 2012 season, a second zone was added to the opening round's track in Melbourne. A third DRS zone was added during 2018 and 2019 seasons in Australia, Bahrain, Canada, Austria, Singapore, and Mexico. In the 2022 season, a fourth zone was initially added for the track in Melbourne, after the circuit redevelopment, before being removed for safety reasons. In the 2023 season the zone was re-added. Bahrain, Jeddah, Melbourne, Baku and Miami had their DRS zones adjusted based on whether the FIA deemed DRS made overtaking at these five circuits too easy or too hard in 2022. A fourth DRS zone was added in Singapore in 2024.

As of the 2026 season, DRS has been dropped, being replaced with an "active aerodynamics" system. It was however retained in Formula Two and Fomula Three.

=== Functional description ===
The horizontal elements of the rear wing consists of the main plane and the flap. The DRS allows the flap to lift a maximum of 85 millimetres (3.3 in) from the fixed main plane. This reduces drag from the wing and results in less downforce. In a straight line, where downforce isn't needed, it allows for faster acceleration and potential top speed, unless limited by the mechanical limits of the engine and transmission. Sam Michael, former sporting director of the McLaren team, believes that DRS in qualifying will be worth about half a second per lap.

The effectiveness of the DRS varies from track to track and, to a lesser extent, from car to car. The system's effectiveness was reviewed in 2011 to see if overtaking could be made easier, but not to the extent that driver skill is sidelined. The effectiveness of DRS seems likely to be determined by the level of downforce at a given circuit (where the cars are in low drag trim at circuits like Monza, the effects may be smaller), length of the activation zone, and characteristics of the track immediately after the DRS zone.

=== Rules on use ===
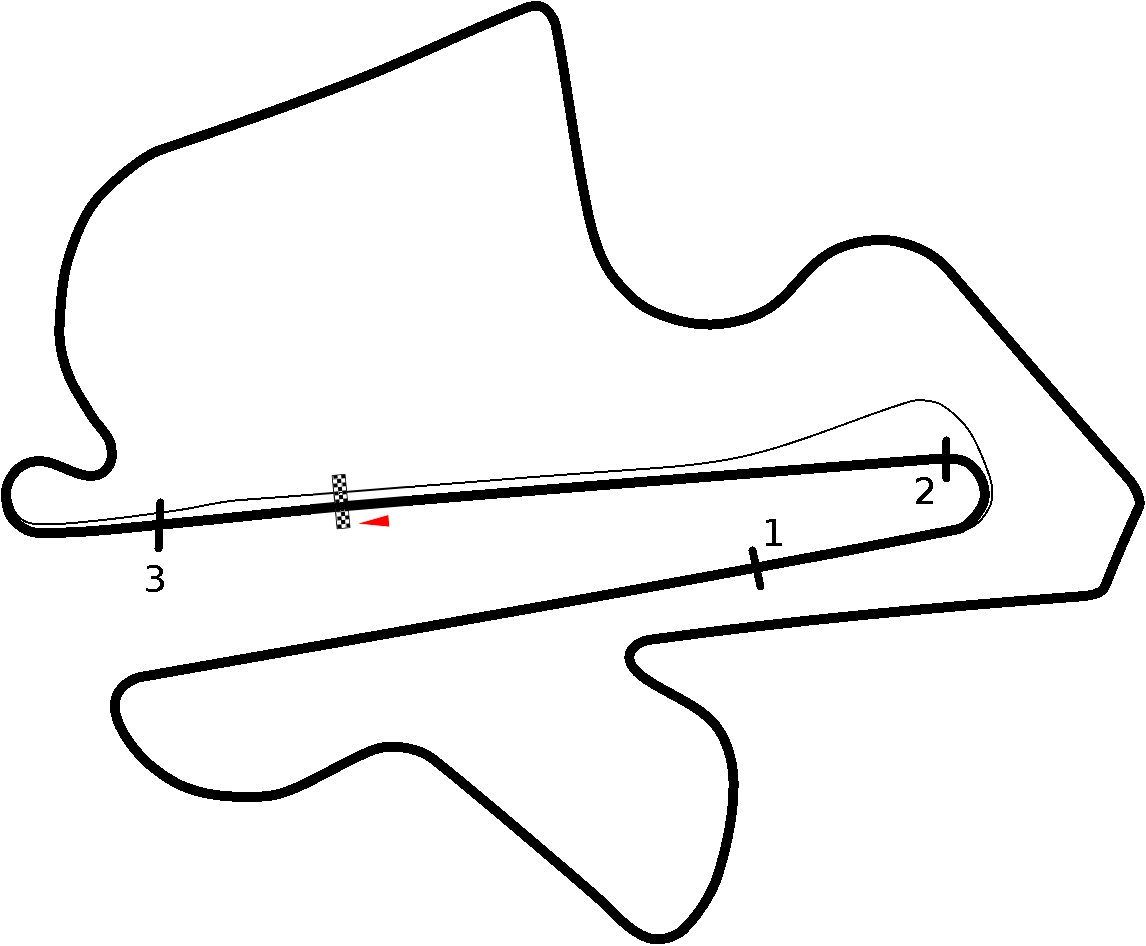
DRS zones on the Sepang International Circuit in 2011. 1: DRS detection point. 2: DRS activation point. 3: approximate DRS deactivation point (braking zone before Turn 1)

Use of DRS was restricted in the F1 rules; it was permitted only when both:

- The following car was within one second of the car to be overtaken, which could be a car being lapped. The FIA was able alter this parameter, race by race.
- The following car was in an overtaking zone as defined by the FIA before the race (commonly known as the DRS zone).

Further:

- The system could not be activated until the end of one lap (from 2024) after the race start, restart, or a safety car deployment. An example was the 2021 Belgian Grand Prix, during which no driver could have activated DRS because the entire race took place behind a safety car, before being terminated due to bad weather.
- The system could not be used by the defending driver, unless within one second of another car in front.
- The system could not be enabled if racing conditions are deemed dangerous by the race director, such as rain, as was the case at the 2011 Canadian Grand Prix.

A dashboard light notified the driver when the system was enabled (the driver could also see the system deploy in their wing mirrors). The system was deactivated when the driver released the button or used the brakes.

There were lines on the track to show the area where the one-second proximity was being detected (the detection point) and a line later on the track (the activation point), along with a sign vertically marked "DRS" where the DRS zone itself began.

== Reception ==
There has been a mixed reaction to the introduction of DRS in Formula One amongst both fans and drivers. Some believe that this is the solution to the lack of overtaking in F1 in recent years while others believe this has made overtaking too easy. Former Formula One and Team Penske IndyCar Series driver Juan Pablo Montoya described it as "like giving Picasso Photoshop". The principal argument for the opponents of DRS is that the driver in front does not have an equal chance of defending their position because they are not allowed to deploy DRS to defend. The tightening up on the rules for a leading driver defending their position has added to this controversy. In 2018, then-Scuderia Ferrari driver Sebastian Vettel stated that he preferred throwing bananas Mario Kart-style over the use of DRS, arguing that it's "artificial".

== Road car use ==
The McLaren P1 coupé is the first road car to have incorporated the F1-style rear wing Drag Reduction System. McLaren Senna GTR and Porsche 911 (992) GT3 RS later followed suit by the introduction of the same system in 2019 and 2022 respectively.

== See also ==
- Kinetic energy recovery system (KERS)
- Push-to-pass
