= 2009 Belgian Grand Prix =

Coordinates: 50°26′14″N 5°58′17″E

Race 12 of 17 in the 2009 Formula One World Championship
← Previous race	Next race →
- Circuit de Spa-Francorchamps

Race details
- Date: 30 August 2009
- Official name: 2009 Formula 1 ING Belgian Grand Prix
- Location: Circuit de Spa-Francorchamps, Francorchamps, Wallonia, Belgium
- Course: Permanent racing facility
- Course length: 7.004 km (4.352 miles)
- Distance: 44 laps, 308.052 km (191.415 miles)
- Weather: Clear but Mild

Pole position
Driver	(Italy) Giancarlo Fisichella	Force India-Mercedes
- Time: 1:46.308

Fastest lap
Driver	(Germany) Sebastian Vettel	Red Bull-Renault
- Time: 1:47.263 on lap 38

Podium
First	(Finland) Kimi Räikkönen	Ferrari
Second	(Italy) Giancarlo Fisichella	Force India-Mercedes
Third	(Germany) Sebastian Vettel	Red Bull-Renault

The 2009 Belgian Grand Prix (officially the 2009 Formula 1 ING Belgian Grand Prix) was a Formula One motor race held on 30 August 2009 at the Circuit de Spa-Francorchamps, near the village of Francorchamps, Wallonia, Belgium. It was the 12th race of the 2009 Formula One season. The race was contested over 44 laps, with an overall race distance of 308.052 km (191.415 mi). The race was won by Kimi Räikkönen of Ferrari after starting from sixth on the grid. Giancarlo Fisichella of Force India came second after starting from the team's first and only pole position. Sebastian Vettel came third after starting from eighth on the grid.

It was Räikkönen's first Grand Prix victory since the 2008 Spanish Grand Prix and Ferrari's only victory of the season. Fisichella's second position gave Force India their first ever championship points and their first podium. This race also marks Fisichella's final podium and last points in Formula One, before he became a Ferrari test driver in 2010, as well as Räikkönen's 18th and last Grand Prix victory until the 2012 Abu Dhabi Grand Prix and his last for Ferrari until the 2018 United States Grand Prix. This was the last race for Luca Badoer.

== Report ==
=== Background ===
Jenson Button led the World Championship entering the Belgian race weekend despite not scoring a podium since early June. He had an 18-point lead over Brawn GP teammate Rubens Barrichello. Mark Webber was 2½ points behind Barrichello in third and was 4½ points ahead of Red Bull Racing teammate Sebastian Vettel. The respective recoveries of Ferrari and McLaren ensured that the last two World Champions, Kimi Räikkönen and Lewis Hamilton, had scored podiums in the two races leading up to Belgium. Brawn GP led Red Bull Racing by 27½ points in the Constructors' Championship. The next team, Ferrari, were 52½ points behind Red Bull and 80 points behind Brawn. Ferrari's Kimi Räikkönen, who had previously won the event three times, was the only former winner entered in the race.

=== Practice and Qualifying ===
Rain affected the first practice session of the weekend. Only 10 cars got dry lap times in while the rest of the field posting lap times in the wet. Jarno Trulli posted the fastest lap followed by Button. Fernando Alonso was third followed by the two Toro Rossos. Force India's Giancarlo Fisichella posted the fastest time off the wet runners followed by Nico Rosberg. Neither Vettel nor Hamilton posted lap times. The second session stayed dry throughout with Hamilton topping the session. Timo Glock was second and Räikkönen third, the top three cars were separated by less than 0.7s. Fisichella kept his pace for Force India as he came sixth. This was one of the closest sessions in the history of Formula One with 18 of the 20 cars coming within less than a second from the leader. Only Rosberg and Luca Badoer were more than a second away from Hamilton's time. Both Brawns struggled coming only 17th and 18th. This session may have seen another indication that BMW Sauber have greatly improved their car after Nick Heidfeld topped the session. Another Toyota came second with Trulli and Force India's Adrian Sutil came third. Hamilton took 9th place with Button rounding off the top ten. Red Bull's problems with the Renault engine continued as Webber's engine had a major problem. This gave Red Bull-Renault their third engine failure in a week.

The first session would see five cars drop out and decide the final five grid positions. Badoer qualified 20th for the second race in a row, after crashing at the end of the session and bringing out the yellow flag, causing many drivers to slow down. Fisichella topped the session with Trulli finishing just behind him. The other four drivers to be knocked out at the end of the session were Renault's Romain Grosjean (P19), Williams's Kazuki Nakajima (P18) and the two Toro Rossos of Jaime Alguersuari (P17) and Sébastien Buemi (P16). The second session would again see another five cars drop out to decide grid positions 11–15. The session was topped by the Toyota of Jarno Trulli, while BMW Sauber's Robert Kubica was second with Red Bull's Vettel coming third. Also significant in the second part of qualifying was the elimination of Brawn's Jenson Button who could only manage P14. The two McLarens of Heikki Kovalainen (P15) and Hamilton (P12) were also knocked out along with the second Renault of Alonso (P13) and Force India's Adrian Sutil (P11).

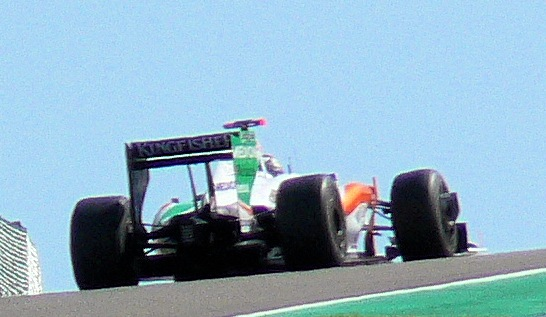
Giancarlo Fisichella claimed the maiden pole position for Force India.

The final session would see the remaining 10 grid positions be decided. Williams's new aero package was not working as they would like as Rosberg qualified P10. The two Red Bulls of Webber (P9) and Vettel (P8) seemed to struggle in conditions favouring their cars. Glock took P7 with Räikkönen, driving the only KERS car in the top 10, coming in sixth. The two BMW Saubers' new updates seemed to be lifting the whole team as Kubica (P5) and Heidfeld (P3) achieved their best qualifying positions of the season. The only Brawn in the final session, that of Rubens Barrichello, took P4. One of the biggest surprises on an already unpredictable track, Force India took their very first pole position. It was Fisichella's first pole position since the 2006 Malaysian Grand Prix. Trulli took second place.

=== Race ===
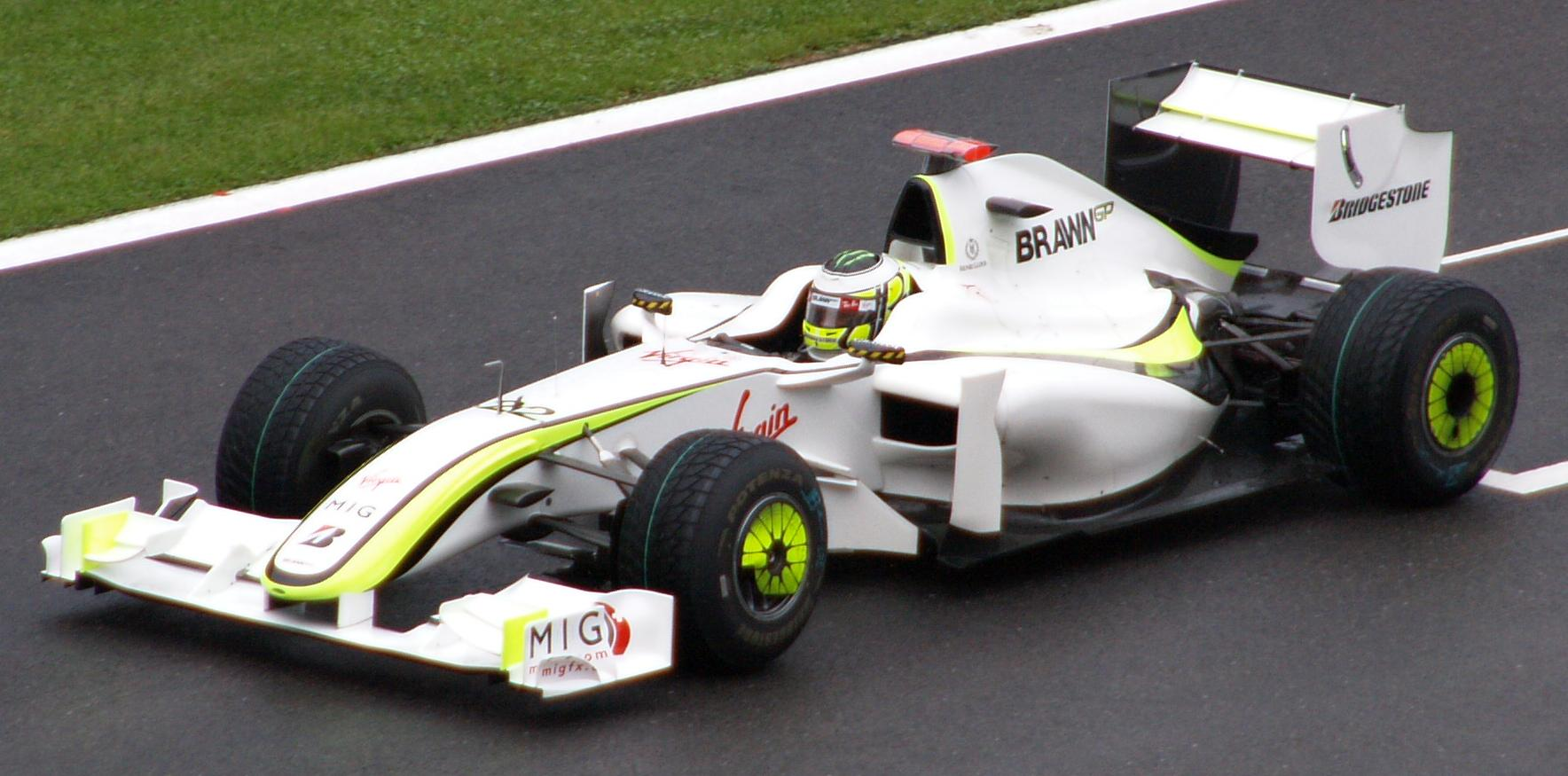
Jenson Button failed to complete the first lap, his only failure to score points in the 2009 campaign.

As the race started everyone seemed to make a good start apart from Hamilton and Rubens Barrichello, the latter almost stalled his car, causing him to drop to the back of the field. At Les Combes, at the top of the hill, a crash caused the safety car to come out. Romain Grosjean ran into the back of Jenson Button who in turn spun 180° and collided with Grosjean for a second time, causing them to both retire. Lewis Hamilton backed off after seeing the incidents ahead of him, which caused Jaime Alguersuari to run into him; both crashed into the barrier and retired. The safety car came in on lap 5 with Fisichella still leading and Räikkönen right behind him. Räikkönen closed up to the Force India driver through the Eau Rouge corner and passed him on the way into Les Combes. The main bulk of the first round of stops came in around lap 14. Mark Webber was released in front of Nick Heidfeld and was handed a drive through penalty, severely affecting his race.

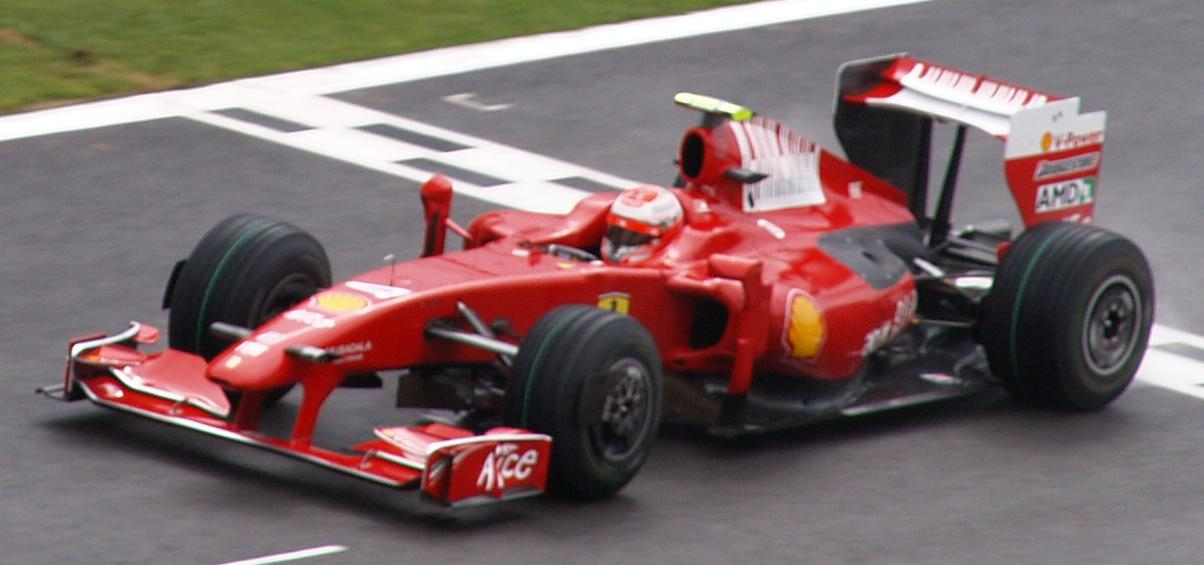
Kimi Räikkönen achieved Ferrari's only win of 2009.

After the first stop Fisichella closed to within one second of Räikkönen. Jarno Trulli retired from the race on lap 22; after starting on the front row he had dropped to the back of the field, having pitted after a first lap collision. Fernando Alonso retired on lap 27 with a suspected wheel problem after a first corner collision with Adrian Sutil. Räikkönen and Fisichella pitted for the second time on the same lap and it was the Finn who emerged in front and kept his lead. Vettel recorded the fastest lap of the race with a late push to try to catch the leaders but it was to no avail as Räikkönen took the chequered flag for the first time this season with Fisichella scoring Force India's first-ever points with a second-place finish. Vettel finished third, followed by the two BMW Saubers and Heikki Kovalainen finishing sixth. After dropping to the back of the field at the start, Rubens Barrichello came in seventh with Nico Rosberg picking up the final point in eighth, finishing his seven race points streak. Barrichello's car was smoking from the back for the last few laps and the car caught fire in parc fermé. Webber finished ninth for the second race in a row and scored no points.

=== Post-race ===
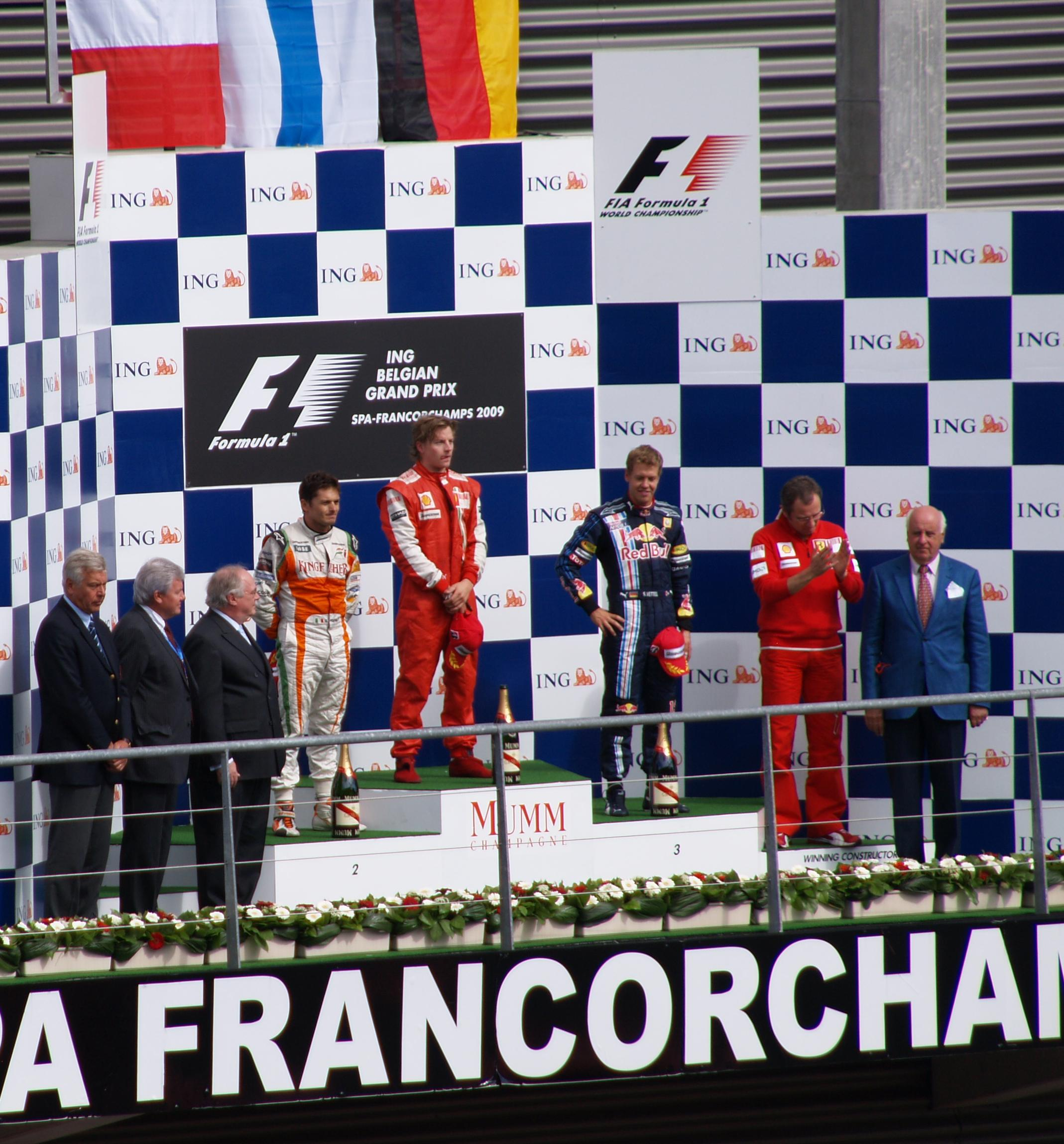
The post-race podium ceremony. From left to right: Giancarlo Fisichella, Kimi Räikkönen, Sebastian Vettel and Stefano Domenicali.

With Button failing to score, his championship lead became smaller for the second race in a row as his teammate Barrichello closed the gap by two points. Vettel's third place moved him ahead of his teammate Webber. Raikkonen's win further extended Ferrari's lead in the constructors' championship over McLaren, but his teammate Luca Badoer was again under scrutiny after finishing last for the second time: reports came out of the paddock that second place man Fisichella would replace him at Ferrari for the Italian Grand Prix. On 31 August Force India team principal Vijay Mallya reported that Fisichella would not be driving for Ferrari at Monza. However, on 3 September Fisichella was released from his contract at Force India and joined Ferrari until the end of the season. Force India announced on 7 September that Vitantonio Liuzzi, the team's test driver, would replace Fisichella for the remaining five races of the season.

On 4 September, Renault were summoned to a meeting by Formula One's governing body, the FIA with the allegations of race fixing during the 2008 Singapore Grand Prix. Renault faced the possibility of expulsion from the championship as McLaren were in the 2007 Formula One season. During the FIA World Motor Sport Council meeting later that month, Renault admitted that Nelson Piquet Jr. had deliberately crashed under the instructions of Renault team principal Flavio Briatore and chief engineer Pat Symonds, in the hope of helping Alonso win. The Renault team were handed a disqualification from F1, which was suspended for two years pending any further rule infringements. Briatore was banned from all FIA-sanctioned events for life, while Symonds was banned for five years.

== Classification ==
=== Qualifying ===
Cars that used KERS are marked with "‡"

Pos	No	Driver	Constructor	Part 1	Part 2	Part 3	Grid
1	21	(Italy) Giancarlo Fisichella	Force India-Mercedes	1:45.102	1:44.667	1:46.308	1
2	9	(Italy) Jarno Trulli	Toyota	1:45.140	1:44.503	1:46.395	2
3	6	(Germany) Nick Heidfeld	BMW Sauber	1:45.566	1:44.709	1:46.500	3
4	23	(Brazil) Rubens Barrichello	Brawn-Mercedes	1:45.237	1:44.834	1:46.513	4
5	5	(Poland) Robert Kubica	BMW Sauber	1:45.655	1:44.557	1:46.586	5
6	4‡	(Finland) Kimi Räikkönen	Ferrari	1:45.579	1:44.953	1:46.633	6
7	10	(Germany) Timo Glock	Toyota	1:45.450	1:44.877	1:46.677	7
8	15	(Germany) Sebastian Vettel	Red Bull-Renault	1:45.372	1:44.592	1:46.761	8
9	14	(Australia) Mark Webber	Red Bull-Renault	1:45.350	1:44.924	1:46.788	9
10	16	(Germany) Nico Rosberg	Williams-Toyota	1:45.486	1:45.047	1:47.362	10
11	20	(Germany) Adrian Sutil	Force India-Mercedes	1:45.239	1:45.119		11
12	1‡	(United Kingdom) Lewis Hamilton	McLaren-Mercedes	1:45.767	1:45.122		12
13	7	(Spain) Fernando Alonso	Renault	1:45.707	1:45.136		13
14	22	(United Kingdom) Jenson Button	Brawn-Mercedes	1:45.761	1:45.251		14
15	2‡	(Finland) Heikki Kovalainen	McLaren-Mercedes	1:45.705	1:45.259		15
16	12	(Switzerland) Sébastien Buemi	Toro Rosso-Ferrari	1:45.951			16
17	11	(Spain) Jaime Alguersuari	Toro Rosso-Ferrari	1:46.302			17
18	17	(Japan) Kazuki Nakajima	Williams-Toyota	1:46.307			18
19	8	(France) Romain Grosjean	Renault	1:46.359			19
20	3‡	(Italy) Luca Badoer	Ferrari	1:46.957			20

=== Race ===
Cars that used KERS are marked with "‡"

Pos	No	Driver	Constructor	Laps	Time/Retired	Grid	Points
1	4‡	(Finland) Kimi Räikkönen	Ferrari	44	1:23:50.995	6	10
2	21	(Italy) Giancarlo Fisichella	Force India-Mercedes	44	+0.939	1	8
3	15	(Germany) Sebastian Vettel	Red Bull-Renault	44	+3.875	8	6
4	5	(Poland) Robert Kubica	BMW Sauber	44	+9.966	5	5
5	6	(Germany) Nick Heidfeld	BMW Sauber	44	+11.276	3	4
6	2‡	(Finland) Heikki Kovalainen	McLaren-Mercedes	44	+32.763	15	3
7	23	(Brazil) Rubens Barrichello	Brawn-Mercedes	44	+35.461	4	2
8	16	(Germany) Nico Rosberg	Williams-Toyota	44	+36.208	10	1
9	14	(Australia) Mark Webber	Red Bull-Renault	44	+36.959	9	
10	10	(Germany) Timo Glock	Toyota	44	+41.490	7	
11	20	(Germany) Adrian Sutil	Force India-Mercedes	44	+42.636	11	
12	12	(Switzerland) Sébastien Buemi	Toro Rosso-Ferrari	44	+46.106	16	
13	17	(Japan) Kazuki Nakajima	Williams-Toyota	44	+54.241	18	
14	3‡	(Italy) Luca Badoer	Ferrari	44	+1:42.177	20	
Ret	7	(Spain) Fernando Alonso	Renault	26	Wheel	13	
Ret	9	(Italy) Jarno Trulli	Toyota	21	Brakes	2	
Ret	1‡	(United Kingdom) Lewis Hamilton	McLaren-Mercedes	0	Collision	12	
Ret	22	(United Kingdom) Jenson Button	Brawn-Mercedes	0	Collision	14	
Ret	11	(Spain) Jaime Alguersuari	Toro Rosso-Ferrari	0	Collision	17	
Ret	8	(France) Romain Grosjean	Renault	0	Collision	19	

== Championship standings after the race ==
Drivers' Championship standings

	Pos.	Driver	Points
	1	(United Kingdom) **Jenson Button***	72
	2	(Brazil) **Rubens Barrichello***	56
1	3	(Germany) **Sebastian Vettel***	53
1	4	(Australia) **Mark Webber***	51.5
2	5	(Finland) **Kimi Räikkönen***	34

Constructors' Championship standings

Pos.	Driver	Points
1	(United Kingdom) **Brawn-Mercedes***	128
2	(Austria) **Red Bull-Renault***	104.5
3	(Italy) **Ferrari***	56
4	(United Kingdom) **McLaren-Mercedes***	44
5	(Japan) **Toyota***	38.5

- Note: Only the top five positions are included for both sets of standings.
- Competitors in bold and marked with an asterisk still had a mathematical chance of becoming World Champion.

== See also ==
- 2009 Spa-Francorchamps GP2 Series round

== Footnotes ==
Previous race: 2009 European Grand Prix	FIA Formula One World Championship; 2009 season	Next race: 2009 Italian Grand Prix
Previous race: 2008 Belgian Grand Prix	Belgian Grand Prix	Next race: 2010 Belgian Grand Prix
