= Thomson Park =

Thomson Park may refer to:

- Thomson Memorial Park, a park in Toronto, Ontario, Canada
- Thomson Nature Park, a nature park in Singapore
- Thomson Park (Fiji), a sports stadium in Fiji

== See also ==
- Thompson Park (disambiguation)
