= 2009 Italian Grand Prix =

Race 13 of 17 in the 2009 Formula One World Championship
← Previous race	Next race →

Race details
- Date: 13 September 2009
- Official name: Formula 1 Gran Premio Santander d'Italia 2009
- Location: Autodromo Nazionale di Monza, Monza, Italy
- Course: Permanent racing facility
- Course length: 5.793 km (3.6 miles)
- Distance: 53 laps, 306.720 km (190.58 miles)
- Weather: Mainly sunny

Pole position
Driver	(United Kingdom) Lewis Hamilton	McLaren-Mercedes
- Time: 1:24.066

Fastest lap
Driver	(Germany) Adrian Sutil	Force India-Mercedes
- Time: 1:24.739 on lap 36

Podium
First	(Brazil) Rubens Barrichello	Brawn-Mercedes
Second	(United Kingdom) Jenson Button	Brawn-Mercedes
Third	(Finland) Kimi Räikkönen	Ferrari

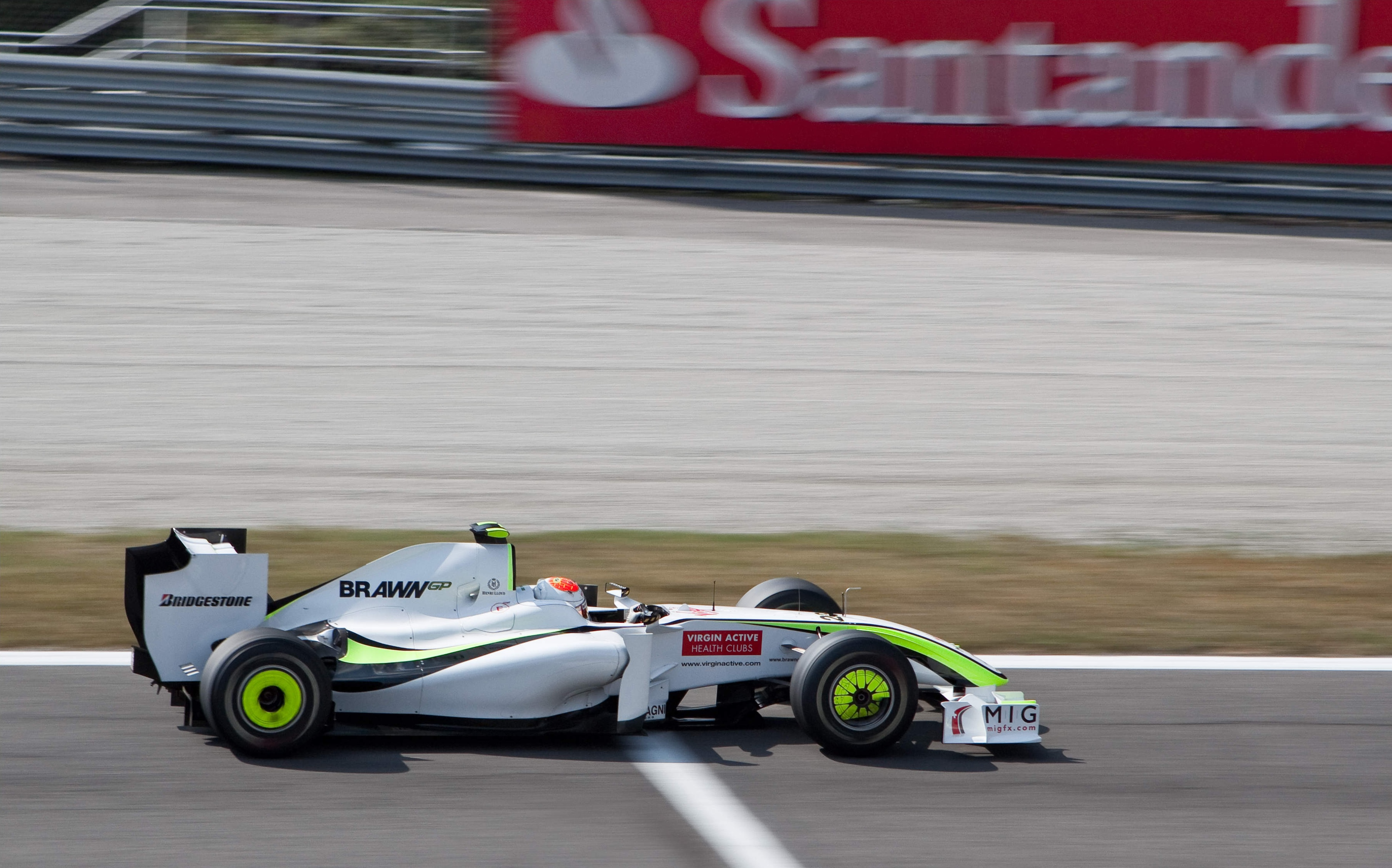
Rubens Barrichello in the Brawn BGP 001

The 2009 Italian Grand Prix (formally the Formula 1 Gran Premio Santander d'Italia 2009) was a Formula One motor race held on 13 September 2009 at the Autodromo Nazionale di Monza, Monza, Italy. It was the 13th race of the 2009 Formula One World Championship. It was contested over 53 laps.

The race was won by Rubens Barrichello driving for Brawn GP. It would be the last win for Barrichello and for the team, and also the last time Barrichello finished on the podium, as well. Teammate and Championship Leader Jenson Button came in second, completing Brawn's fourth (and last) one-two finish of the season, while the Ferrari of Kimi Räikkönen came third after reigning World Champion Lewis Hamilton crashed on the final lap. Hamilton's crash meant the race officially finished behind the safety car, despite the safety car not picking up the leader. Adrian Sutil, who finished in fourth place, recorded the first fastest lap of his career, and the first for the Force India team.

As of 2026, this is the last race win for a Brazilian Formula One driver.

== Report ==
=== Background ===
Jenson Button led the Drivers Championship by 16 points from Brawn GP teammate Rubens Barrichello, who led Red Bull's third placed man Sebastian Vettel by 3 points. Brawn led the Constructors Championship by 23½ points from Red Bull who were a further 48½ points ahead of winners of the previous race, Ferrari.

Vettel won his maiden Formula One race in the 2008 race for the Toro Rosso team, that made him the youngest driver to win a Formula One race, in the first race won by both the Toro Rosso team since they were formed as Minardi and by a customer Ferrari engine. The only other Italian Grand Prix winners in the field are Fernando Alonso and Barrichello. No Italian has won his home Grand Prix since Ferrari's Ludovico Scarfiotti won his only race at the 1966 race. Jarno Trulli, Vitantonio Liuzzi and Giancarlo Fisichella were the only current Italians in the field this year, with Luca Badoer replaced as Ferrari's stand-in by Fisichella. Fisichella became the first Italian since Ivan Capelli in 1992 to race for Ferrari at Monza, after terminating his Force India contract. Fisichella was replaced by Force India test driver Liuzzi.

Renault decided to use KERS for the first time since Spanish Grand Prix weekend.

=== Practice ===
The first session of the Italian GP finished with the McLarens on top with Lewis Hamilton and Heikki Kovalainen first and second fastest, respectively. Force India's Adrian Sutil finished the session in third. Renault's Fernando Alonso finished fourth while teammate Romain Grosjean finished fifteenth. Fischella, driving for Ferrari for the first time in his career, finished eighth ahead of teammate Kimi Räikkönen who ended the session in tenth. Toyota's Trulli and Timo Glock were at the back of the pack. Championship leader Jenson Button ended seventh while his Brawn teammate Rubens Barrichello finished twelfth.

In the second session Force India's Adrian Sutil was fastest, ahead of the two Renaults of Grosjean and Alonso. Hamilton was eleventh with Kovalainen coming in fourth. Button in a Brawn finished 19th, with only Fisichella separating him from last place. Red Bull's Sebastian Vettel came eighteenth, and Mark Webber in fourteenth.

The final practice session ahead of Qualifying again saw Sutil fastest, ahead of the Brawn of Jenson Button with teammate Barrichello in fourth. The two McLarens ended fifth and sixth, with Fisichella's replacement at Force India, Vitantonio Liuzzi, in seventh. The two Red Bulls ended the session 17th and 18th. Fisichella ended the session last, with Räikkönen's other Ferrari in twelfth.

=== Qualifying ===
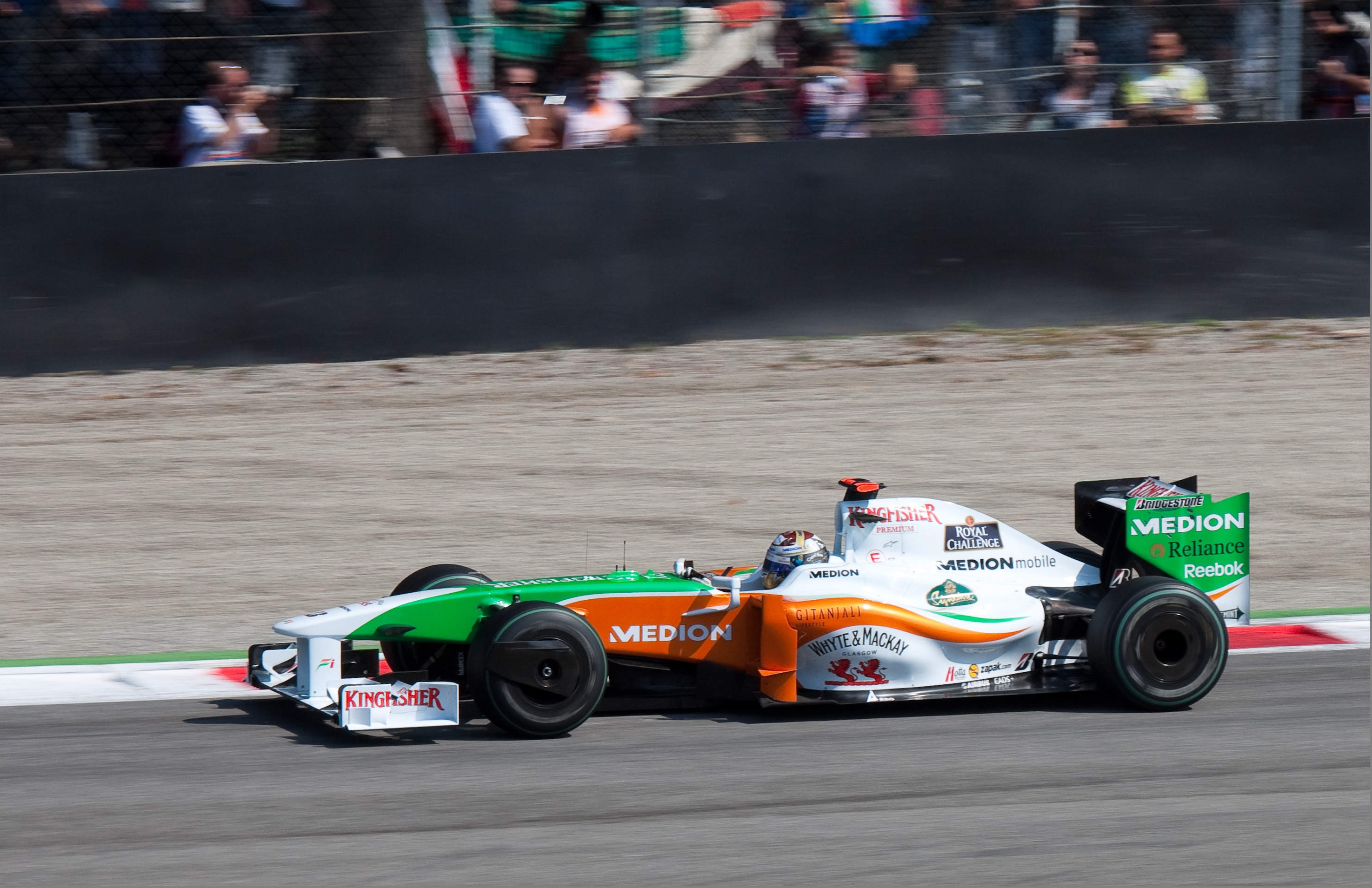
Adrian Sutil qualified in a career-best second position, placing a Force India on the front row for the second consecutive race.

The first session, lasting 20 minutes, decided the final five places on the grid. Five minutes into the session Liuzzi ran off the track but did not damage his car and managed to proceed through to the next part of qualifying. Räikkönen topped the session ahead of Hamilton and Kovalainen. Both Toro Rossos and both Williams cars were knocked out along with the Toyota of Timo Glock. Fisichella made it through to the next session, making it the first time since the Hungarian Grand Prix that both Ferraris had made it through to Q2. Grosjean also progressed to Q2.

The second session, lasting 15 minutes, decided positions 11 to 15. Five minutes into the session Nick Heidfeld's BMW engine gave way to leave him in 15th for the race. Seven minutes later, the other BMW of Robert Kubica appeared to have the same problem and pulled off with engine problems just before the first corner. This left Kubica qualifying in 13th. Fisichella was unable to make it through to the final session of qualifying. Button topped the session, with Hamilton in second and Force India's Adrian Sutil in third. After the chequered flag had fallen Liuzzi was the final driver to post a time moving from 13th into the top 10. The other drivers not to make it were Grosjean and Trulli.

The final session, lasting ten minutes, decided the top ten positions. Early on, Alonso set the fastest time in the first sector, but it was Räikkönen who had the best time overall. Very soon afterwards Hamilton set the fastest lap, while Webber, Alonso, Sutil and Räikkönen traded second place. The chequered flag fell and very few cars were still out, but it was Hamilton who came out on top to snatch pole from Sutil. Although Button qualified sixth and his teammate Barrichello in fifth, they looked well-placed after the fuel loads were released and both were on a one stop strategy, while Hamilton, Sutil and Räikkönen were all on a two stop strategy.

=== Race ===
At the start, Lewis Hamilton held onto his lead with Kimi Räikkönen in second, ahead of Adrian Sutil. Heikki Kovalainen, on a one-stop fuel strategy was overtaken by the similarly fuelled Brawns of Rubens Barrichello, off the start line, and Jenson Button, through the second Lesmo. Championship contender Mark Webber was spun by Robert Kubica at Della Roggia on the opening lap and was forced to retire. By Lap 15, Kubica had also retired with an oil leak. Before this, on lap 9, Kubica was shown the black flag with orange circle because he damaged his front wing during his contact with Webber, meaning he was summoned to the pits to repair it.

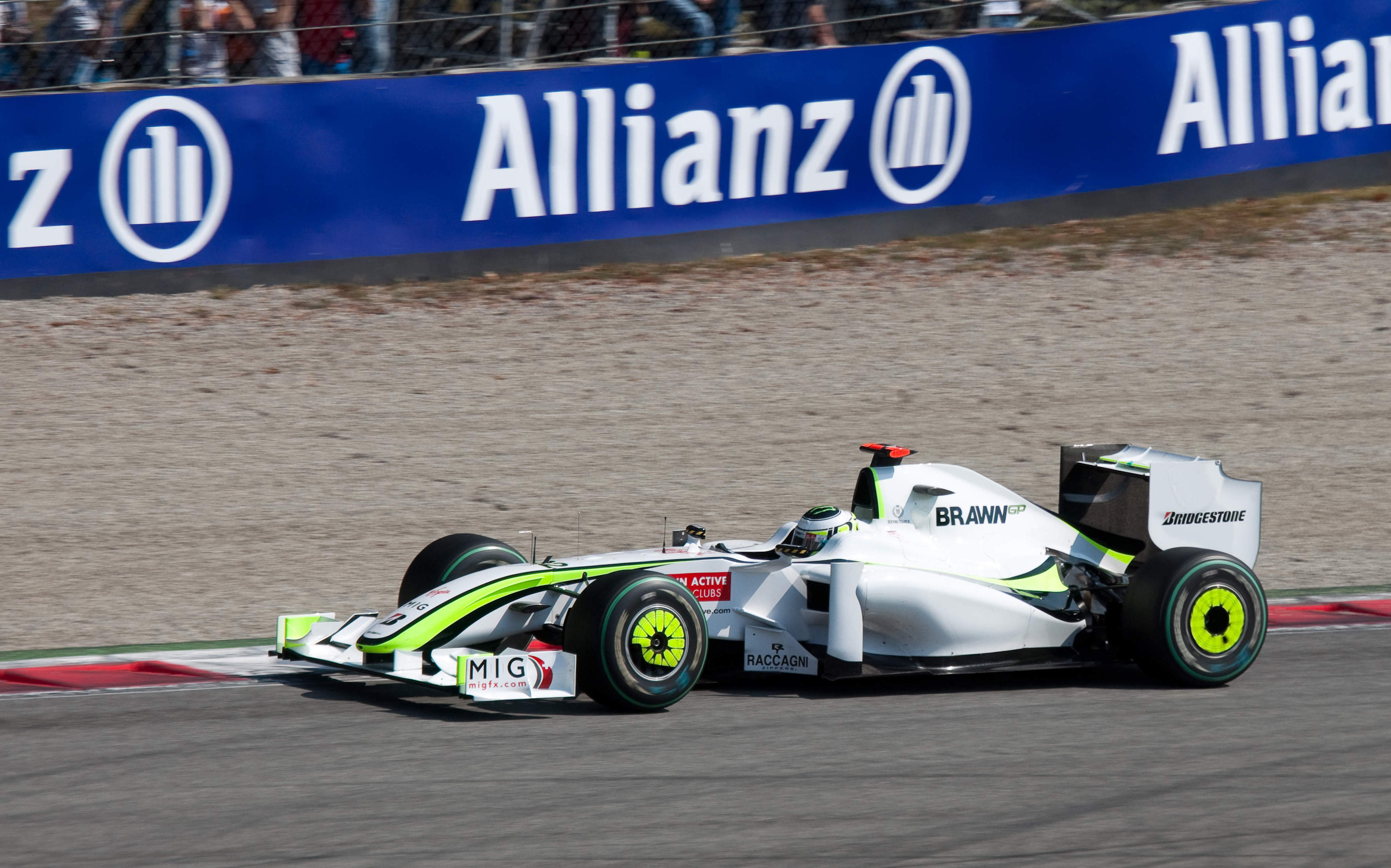
Jenson Button finished on the podium for the first time since his win in Turkey.

The battle for the lead was tactical, with the Brawn cars stopping only once while Hamilton was on a two-stop strategy. Barrichello and Button were able to lap consistently faster than Hamilton despite their heavier fuel load, meaning when Hamilton emerged from his second pit stop he found himself behind both Brawns in third position. Reigning World Champion Hamilton tried in vain to overtake Championship leader Button over the final few laps before crashing into the barriers on the exit of the first Lesmo as he attempted to catch Button. Hamilton's crash left debris across the race track, meaning the safety car was deployed despite it being the final lap of the race. The safety car was therefore unable to pick up the leader, Barrichello, before he took the chequered flag as he would take Brawn's eighth win of the season and his third at Monza. A less dramatic repeat of this situation would occur 13 years later, when a McLaren car stranded in the exact same place on the circuit brought out another race-ending safety car. This race had also proven to be the 11th and last victory, as well as the last podium for Rubens Barrichello's very long, very distinguished and very up-and-down career. It was also Brawn GP's final victory.

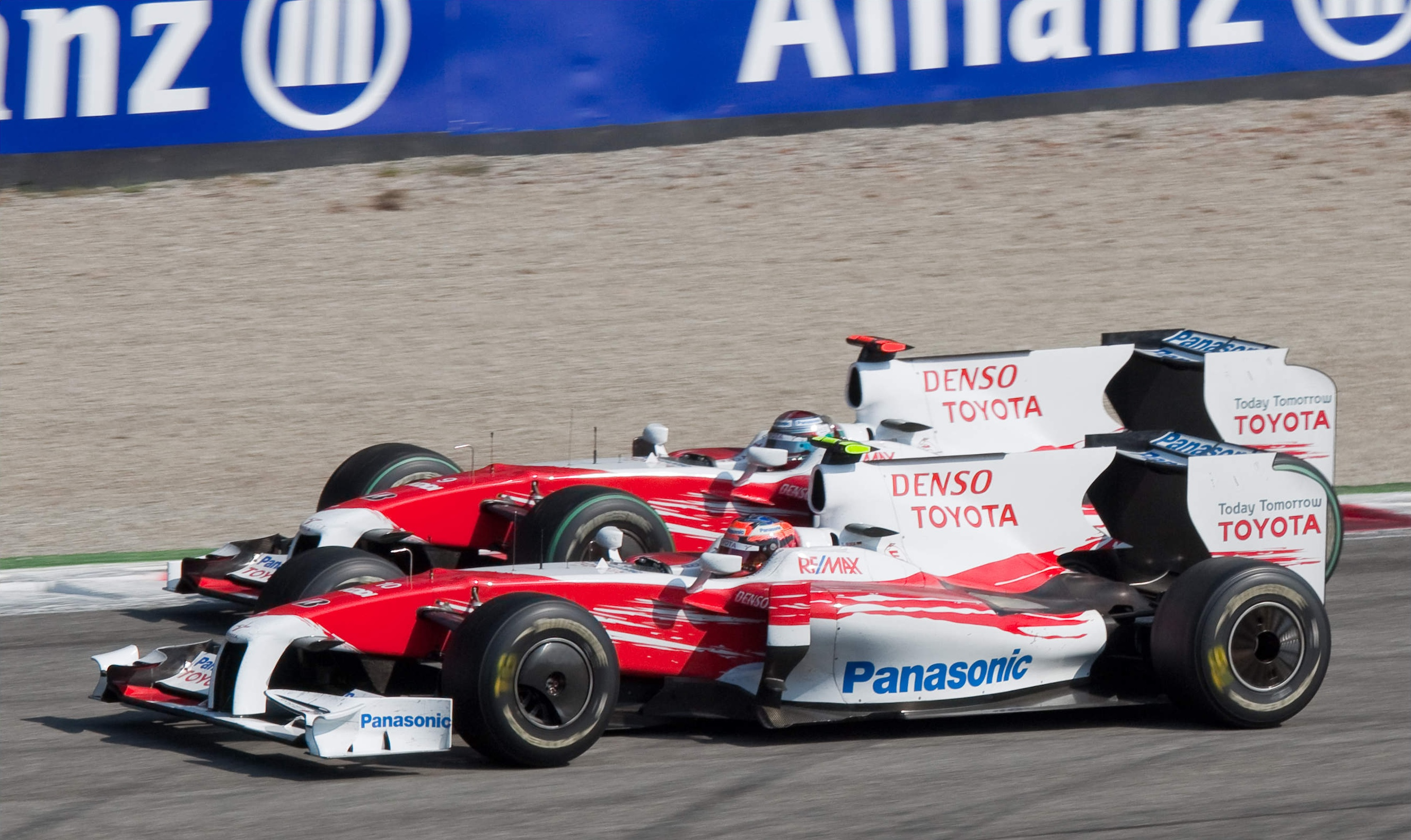
The two Toyotas battling for track position.

The safety car ended a race long battle between the similarly fuelled Räikkönen and Sutil. Sutil was able to keep up with the Ferrari driver throughout the race, but couldn't get close enough to pass as a result of turbulent air through the final corner. Both made their second and final pit stop at the same time, Räikkönen coming out of the pits first despite a delay leaving his garage after Sutil drove too fast into his box, knocking over a mechanic, who was unhurt. Despite Sutil's pressure over the closing stages, Räikkönen held on to inherit third place which would be his last podium until the 2012 Bahrain Grand Prix. Sutil did have the consolation of claiming the fastest lap of the race, Force India's first in Formula One. This would remain Sutil's outright best finishing position in his career - he inherited the record for the longest podium-less F1 career from Nico Hülkenberg after the 2025 British Grand Prix.

Fernando Alonso finished fifth, ahead of Kovalainen despite the Finn being on the race-winning one-stop strategy. Nick Heidfeld finished seventh after working his way through the field from fifteenth on the grid. Sebastian Vettel took the final point, ahead of Ferrari debutant Giancarlo Fisichella. Fisichella's replacement at Force India, Vitantonio Liuzzi, retired with a mechanical problem while challenging for the points.

=== Post–race ===
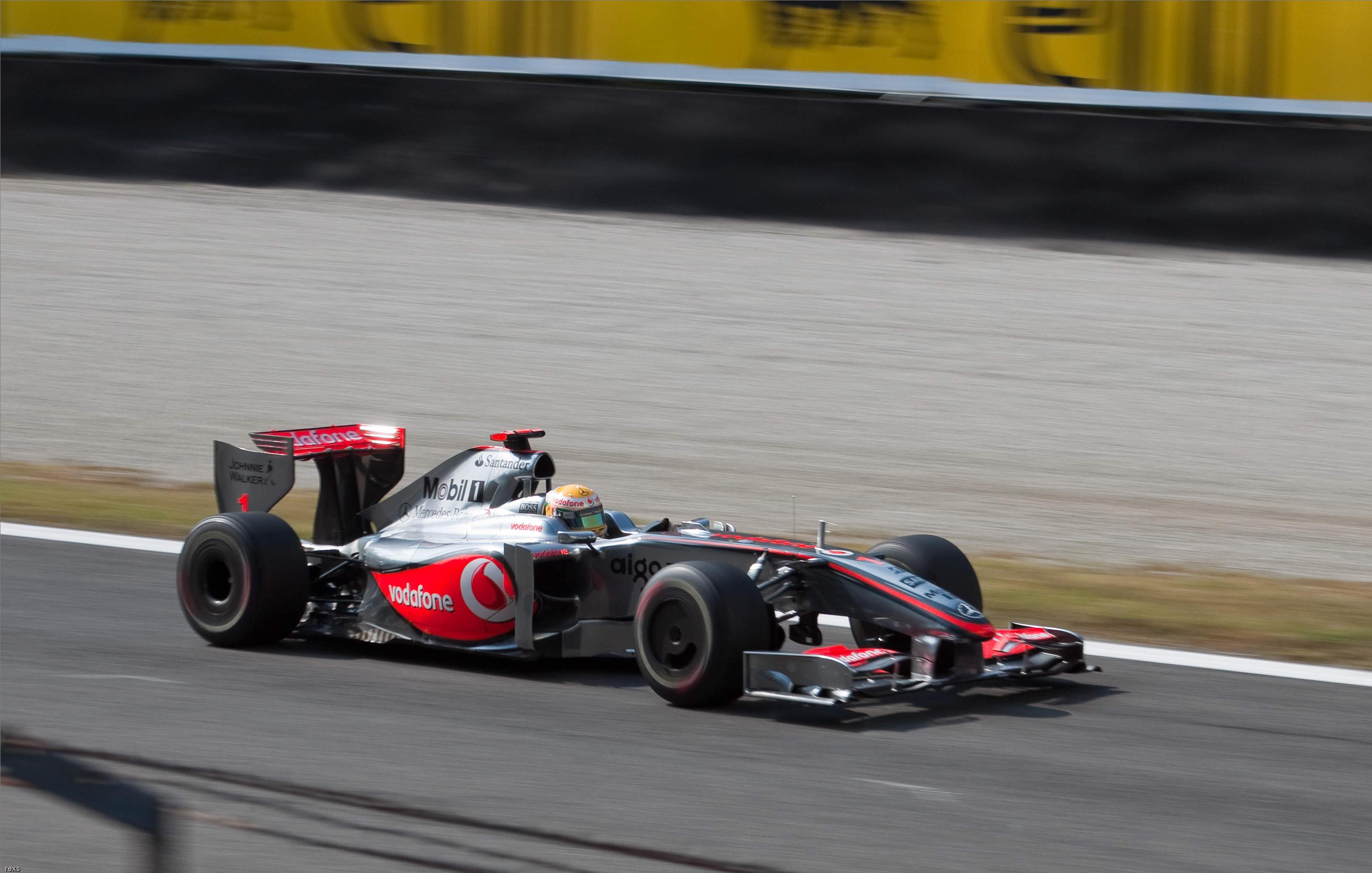
Lewis Hamilton crashed out on the last lap, mathematically eliminating him from championship contention.

The poor performance from the Red Bull cars, combined with Brawn's 1–2 finish, meant the Drivers Championship became effectively a two-horse race between Button, who led Barrichello by 14 points with four races to go. Vettel was 26 points behind Button with Webber a further 2.5 points adrift. Brawn team boss Ross Brawn said after the race he would allow his drivers to compete amongst themselves for the Drivers Championship, as his team was virtually assured of the Constructors Championship. Barrichello admitted he was relishing the prospect of a straight title fight after playing second fiddle to Michael Schumacher whilst the German won five world championships at Ferrari. A visibly more relaxed Button was magnanimous in defeat and happy to face a battle from within.

Webber admitted frustration at his first non-finish of the year following such a "small" accident, while Vettel insisted his Championship chances were not over. McLaren team principal Martin Whitmarsh did not criticise Hamilton for his last lap crash, stating the accident was a result of the Briton's "never-give-up attitude, his unquenchable desire to fight until the very last metre of the very last lap." The focus of the F1 paddock after the race, however, was on the looming Crashgate hearing at the FIA World Motor Sport Council in Paris the following week. This was to determine whether Renault had asked former driver Nelson Piquet Jr. to crash at the 2008 Singapore Grand Prix, to aid teammate Fernando Alonso ultimately win the race.

Lewis Hamilton mathematically conceded the defence of his 2008 World Championship following the result of this race as only Jenson Button, Rubens Barrichello, Sebastian Vettel and Mark Webber were mathematically able to win the Championship. 2007 World Champion Kimi Räikkönen also mathematically conceded the World Championship as a result of this race, while 2005 and 2006 World Champion Fernando Alonso was already out of contention before this race. As a result, it meant following this race a brand new World Champion was guaranteed to be crowned for 2009.

== Classification ==
=== Qualifying ===
Cars that use the KERS system are marked with "‡"

Pos	No	Driver	Constructor	Part 1	Part 2	Part 3	Grid
1	1‡	(United Kingdom) Lewis Hamilton	McLaren-Mercedes	1:23.375	1:22.973	1:24.066	1
2	20	(Germany) Adrian Sutil	Force India-Mercedes	1:23.576	1:23.070	1:24.261	2
3	4‡	(Finland) Kimi Räikkönen	Ferrari	1:23.349	1:23.426	1:24.523	3
4	2‡	(Finland) Heikki Kovalainen	McLaren-Mercedes	1:23.515	1:23.528	1:24.845	4
5	23	(Brazil) Rubens Barrichello	Brawn-Mercedes	1:23.483	1:22.976	1:25.015	5
6	22	(United Kingdom) Jenson Button	Brawn-Mercedes	1:23.403	1:22.955	1:25.030	6
7	21	(Italy) Vitantonio Liuzzi	Force India-Mercedes	1:23.578	1:23.207	1:25.043	7
8	7‡	(Spain) Fernando Alonso	Renault	1:23.708	1:23.497	1:25.072	8
9	15	(Germany) Sebastian Vettel	Red Bull-Renault	1:23.558	1:23.545	1:25.180	9
10	14	(Australia) Mark Webber	Red Bull-Renault	1:23.755	1:23.273	1:25.314	10
11	9	(Italy) Jarno Trulli	Toyota	1:24.014	1:23.611		11
12	8‡	(France) Romain Grosjean	Renault	1:23.975	1:23.728		12
13	5	(Poland) Robert Kubica	BMW Sauber	1:24.001	1:23.866		13
14	3‡	(Italy) Giancarlo Fisichella	Ferrari	1:23.828	1:23.901		14
15	6	(Germany) Nick Heidfeld	BMW Sauber	1:23.584	1:24.275		15
16	10	(Germany) Timo Glock	Toyota	1:24.036			16
17	17	(Japan) Kazuki Nakajima	Williams-Toyota	1:24.074			17
18	16	(Germany) Nico Rosberg	Williams-Toyota	1:24.121			18
19	12	(Switzerland) Sébastien Buemi	Toro Rosso-Ferrari	1:24.220			19
20	11	(Spain) Jaime Alguersuari	Toro Rosso-Ferrari	1:24.951			20

- ^1 - Jaime Alguersuari was given a five-place grid penalty for a gearbox change prior to qualifying, but ultimately this did not affect his position, as he qualified in 20th place.

=== Race ===
Cars that use the KERS system are marked with "‡"

Pos	No	Driver	Constructor	Laps	Time/Retired	Grid	Points
1	23	(Brazil) Rubens Barrichello	Brawn-Mercedes	53	1:16:21.706	5	10
2	22	(United Kingdom) Jenson Button	Brawn-Mercedes	53	+2.866	6	8
3	4‡	(Finland) Kimi Räikkönen	Ferrari	53	+30.664	3	6
4	20	(Germany) Adrian Sutil	Force India-Mercedes	53	+31.131	2	5
5	7‡	(Spain) Fernando Alonso	Renault	53	+59.182	8	4
6	2‡	(Finland) Heikki Kovalainen	McLaren-Mercedes	53	+1:00.693	4	3
7	6	(Germany) Nick Heidfeld	BMW Sauber	53	+1:22.412	15	2
8	15	(Germany) Sebastian Vettel	Red Bull-Renault	53	+1:25.407	9	1
9	3‡	(Italy) Giancarlo Fisichella	Ferrari	53	+1:26.856	14	
10	17	(Japan) Kazuki Nakajima	Williams-Toyota	53	+2:42.163	17	
11	10	(Germany) Timo Glock	Toyota	53	+2:43.925	16	
12	1‡	(United Kingdom) Lewis Hamilton	McLaren-Mercedes	52	Accident	1	
13	12	(Switzerland) Sébastien Buemi	Toro Rosso-Ferrari	52	Followed safety car	19	
14	9	(Italy) Jarno Trulli	Toyota	52	+1 Lap	11	
15	8‡	(France) Romain Grosjean	Renault	52	+1 Lap	12	
16	16	(Germany) Nico Rosberg	Williams-Toyota	51	+2 Laps	18	
Ret	21	(Italy) Vitantonio Liuzzi	Force India-Mercedes	22	Driveshaft	7	
Ret	11	(Spain) Jaime Alguersuari	Toro Rosso-Ferrari	19	Gearbox	20	
Ret	5	(Poland) Robert Kubica	BMW Sauber	15	Oil leak	13	
Ret	14	(Australia) Mark Webber	Red Bull-Renault	0	Collision	10	

- ^1 - Although Lewis Hamilton retired on the final lap, he was still classified as a finisher as he had completed 90% of the winner's race distance.
- ^2 - Sébastien Buemi followed the safety car to the pit lane on the final lap and therefore he was not considered to have finished the race. He was classified as he had driven 90% of the winner's race distance.
- ^3 - Jaime Alguersuari started the race from the pitlane after changing parts on his car after qualifying.

== Championship standings after the race ==
Drivers' Championship standings

Pos.	Driver	Points
1	(United Kingdom) Jenson Button*	80
2	(Brazil) Rubens Barrichello*	66
3	(Germany) Sebastian Vettel*	54
4	(Australia) Mark Webber*	51.5
5	(Finland) Kimi Räikkönen	40

Constructors' Championship standings

Pos.	Constructor	Points
1	(United Kingdom) Brawn-Mercedes*	146
2	(Austria) Red Bull-Renault*	105.5
3	(Italy) Ferrari	62
4	(United Kingdom) McLaren-Mercedes	47
5	(Japan) Toyota	38.5

- Note: Only the top five positions are included for both sets of standings.
- Bold text and an asterisk indicates competitors who still had a theoretical chance of becoming World Champion.

== See also ==
- 2009 Monza GP2 Series round

Previous race: 2009 Belgian Grand Prix	FIA Formula One World Championship; 2009 season	Next race: 2009 Singapore Grand Prix
Previous race: 2008 Italian Grand Prix	Italian Grand Prix	Next race: 2010 Italian Grand Prix
