= Thomson Road Grand Prix circuit =

Former street racing circuit in Singapore

Thomson Road Circuit
- Grand Prix Circuit (1961–1973)
- Location: Thomson Road, Singapore
- Coordinates: 1°22′59.52″N 103°49′8.78″E
- Opened: 16 September 1961; 64 years ago
- Closed: 22 April 1973; 53 years ago
- Major events: Singapore Grand Prix (1961, 1966–1973); Malaysia Grand Prix (1962–1965)

Grand Prix Circuit (1961–1973)
- Length: 4.865 km (3.023 mi)
- Turns: 9
- Race lap record: 1:54.9 ( (Australia) Leo Geoghegan, Birrana 273, 1973, Australian F2)

Thomson Road Grand Prix circuit was a former street circuit at Thomson Road in Singapore. It hosted races from 1961 to 1973 for automobiles under Formula Libre and Australian Formula 2 rules as well as for motorcycles.

During the initial years, the main races for motorcycles and cars were 60 laps long. This was eventually refined into two separate races – a preliminary 20 lap event followed by a 40 lap event.

The first Singapore Grand Prix of 1961 was won by lan Barnwell in an Aston Martin DB3S while the first Singapore Grand Prix of post-independence Singapore in 1966, which also ran to Formula Libre rules, saw Singaporean Lee Han Seng win in a Lotus 22. The final victory went to Australian Vern Schuppan in a March 722 in 1973.

== History ==
In 1960, a Grand Prix was devised as part of the "Visit Singapore – The Orient Year" campaign to attract tourists to the region as well as to promote the sport. At that time, Singapore lacked a formal racing circuit, and as a result, a new circuit had to be found. The initial suggestion for a street circuit that ran through Thomson, Whitley, Dunearn and Adam Roads was found to be unfeasible due to the massive traffic disruption it would cause to residents. After consideration of other existing circuits, it was decided that a new circuit would be created along the old and new Upper Thomson Road.

In 1962, Yong Nam Kee – who apparently was known as 'Fatso' due to his size – took victory in an E-Type Jaguar. Hong Kong driver Albert Poon – a Macau Grand Prix winner - triumphed in 1963 and 1965, although the 1964 car race was abandoned after 5 laps because of torrential rain. That year's race was also marred by a marshal being killed when a Jaguar flew off the track and hit him.

On 11 April 1966, Singapore hosted its first national grand prix. Singaporean Lee Han Seng won in a Lotus 22, followed by compatriot Rodney Seow in a Merlyn in 1967.

Elfin founder Garrie Cooper won in 1968, but it was New Zealander Graeme Lawrence who became the most successful driver in the history of the event with three successive wins from 1969 to 1971, the second of those triumphs coming behind the wheel of a Ferrari 246T. Another Australian, Max Stewart, won in 1972, with Vern Schuppan taking a March Formula 2 car to victory in the final Singapore Grand Prix of that era in 1973.

=== Past winners ===
Year	Date	Race name	Driver	Car	Rider	Motorcycle
1961	16–17 September	Singapore Grand Prix	Ian Barnwell	Aston Martin DB3S	Chris Proffit-White	Honda 4
1962	22–23 April	Malaysia Grand Prix	Yong Nam Kee	Jaguar E-Type	Teisuke Tanaka	Honda
1963	14–15 April	Malaysia Grand Prix	Albert Poon	Lotus 23 Ford	Chris Conn	Norton Manx
1964	29–30 March	Malaysia Grand Prix	Race cancelled (weather)	–	Akiyasu Motohashi	Yamaha
1965	11–12 April	Malaysia Grand Prix	Albert Poon	Lotus 23 Ford	Akiyasu Motohashi	Yamaha
1966	9–11 April	Singapore Grand Prix	Lee Han Seng	Lotus 22	Mitsuo Itoh	Suzuki
1967	25–27 March	Singapore Grand Prix	Rodney Seow	Merlyn	Akiyasu Motohashi	Yamaha
1968	12–15 April	Singapore Grand Prix	Garrie Cooper	Elfin 600	Akiyasu Motohashi	Yamaha
1969	4–6 April	Singapore Grand Prix	Graeme Lawrence	McLaren M4A	Tham Bing Kwan	Norton
1970	26–29 March	Singapore Grand Prix	Graeme Lawrence	Ferrari Dino 246T	Ou Teck Win	Yamaha
1971	8–11 April	Singapore Grand Prix	Graeme Lawrence	Brabham BT30	Geoff Perry	Suzuki
1972	30 March–2 April	Singapore Grand Prix	Max Stewart	Mildren Ford	Geoff Perry	Suzuki
1973	18–22 April	Singapore Grand Prix	Vern Schuppan	March 722	Bill Molloy	Kawasaki

== Characteristics ==
The Thomson Road Grand Prix circuit measures 4.865 km (3.023 mi) long per lap and runs in a clockwise direction. The circuit starts with the "Thomson Mile", a mile-long stretch along Upper Thomson Road. Halfway through this stretch of road, there was "The Hump", a right hand turn that caused drivers to lift off the ground if they sped past this bend.

The Thomson Road Grand Prix circuit had many challenging features, including the treacherous "Circus Hairpin" bends and the "Snakes" section. In particular, the "Murder Mile" feature of this track derived its name from the fact that many racing accidents occurred along this stretch. Similarly, "Devil's Bend" got its name because it was the most dangerous part of the circuit.

Seven people died due to racing accidents in the 11 years of the Singapore Grand Prix. Two people died during the last two consecutive editions of the Grand Prix, at the 1972 Singapore Grand Prix, Lionel Chan, the nephew of local racing champion Chan Lye Choon, died after falling into a ravine, while in the 1973 race Swiss competitor Joe Huber died after crashing his car into a telegraph pole.

== Legacy ==
The 1974 edition of the Grand Prix was cancelled due to safety concerns, although the layout has been preserved and is now a part of the Thomson Nature Park. The Singapore Grand Prix would not be held until its revival in 2008, as a Formula One race at the Marina Bay Street Circuit in the country's central business district.

== Lap records ==
The fastest official race lap records at the Thomson Road Grand Prix circuit are listed as:

Category	Time	Driver	Vehicle	Event
Grand Prix Circuit (1961–1973): 4.865 km (3.023 mi)
Australian Formula Two	1:54.900	Leo Geoghegan	Birrana 273	1973 Singapore Grand Prix
Formula Two	1:54.900	Roly Levis	Brabham BT23C	1969 Singapore Grand Prix
Group 4	2:18.300	Lee Han Seng	Lotus 23	1967 Singapore Grand Prix
Sports car racing	2:20.600	Steve Holland	Lotus 47	1968 Singapore Grand Prix

== See also ==
- Malaysia Grand Prix
- Singapore Grand Prix
- Marina Bay Street Circuit
