= 1973 Singapore Grand Prix =

Race details
- Date: 22 April 1973
- Official name: VIII International Singapore Grand Prix
- Location: Old Upper Thomson Road, Singapore
- Course: Thomson Road Grand Prix circuit
- Course length: 4.865 km (3.023 miles)
- Distance: 50 laps, 243.250 km (151.149 miles)

Pole position
Driver	(New Zealand) Graeme Lawrence	Surtees-Hart
- Time: 1:57.1

Fastest lap
Driver	(Australia) Leo Geoghegan	Birrana-Hart
- Time: 1:54.9

Podium
First	(Australia) Vern Schuppan	March-Hart
Second	(New Zealand) Graeme Lawrence	Surtees-Hart
Third	(Hong Kong) John MacDonald	Brabham-Ford

The 1973 Singapore Grand Prix was a motor race held at the Thomson Road Grand Prix circuit on 22 April 1973. It was the final Singapore Grand Prix before the cancellation of the event, which resumed in 2008 as a round of the Formula One World Championship. The race was contested over 50 laps and was won by Vern Schuppan driving a March. The race was run to Australian Formula Two rules.

== Report ==
=== Background ===
John MacDonald had a brand new Brabham BT40 delivered to him for the race. However, his team ran into difficulty due to fuel pick-up problems with the new car.

In the 1972 event, the 28-year-old Singaporean driver Lionel Chan was involved in an accident which saw his car roll into a ditch on the fourth lap after losing a wheel and hitting an official car. He was taken to hospital but fell into a coma and later died. The circuit was considered dangerous and the Singaporean Minister of Social Affairs, Encik Othman Wok, stated, "I'll be the happiest man when we get a permanent circuit."

=== Race ===
Schuppan was leading Malcolm Ramsay's Birrana when Schuppan's March kicked up some stones, puncturing Ramsay's fuel tank and covering him in petrol.

Malcolm soldiered on until the pain of the petrol burning his balls forced him to retire.

— Angus Lamont, mechanic for John MacDonald

=== Aftermath ===
"The circuit over which the Grand Prix is run would send shivers down the collective spines of the CSI safety committee. To obtain the circuit the public roads are simply closed off. If there are any safety devices I didn't see any."

— Richard Feast

During a support race for touring cars, Swiss driver Joe Huber went off the track into a lamp post. He died six days later as a result of his injuries. The difficulty of implementing adequate safety measures, along with concerns that the Grand Prix was promoting reckless driving, led to motor racing being banned in Singapore after the 1973 Grand Prix. Other contributory factors have been suggested, including an increase in traffic, the inconvenience of having to close roads for the event and also a surge of oil prices stemming from the Suez Crisis. On average the Grand Prix saw one fatality per year, partly due to the nature of the circuit which featured monsoon drains and bus stops. Graeme Lawrence, a three-time winner of the Singapore Grand Prix, believed that the Thomson Road circuit was one of the most dangerous in the world.

A permanent track incorporating a sports complex was proposed as a replacement for the Thomson Road circuit, but this did not come to fruition.

== Classification ==
=== Starting grid ===
Pos	Name	Chassis	Engine	Time
1	(New Zealand) Graeme Lawrence	Surtees TS15	Hart	1:57.1
2	(Australia) Vern Schuppan	March 722	Hart	1:57.3
3	(Australia) Leo Geoghegan	Birrana 273	Hart	1:57.8
4	(New Zealand) Ken Smith	March 722	Hart	1:59.1
5	(Hong Kong) John MacDonald	Brabham BT40	Hart	1:59.1
6	(Australia) Malcolm Ramsay	Birrana 273	Hart	1:59.5
7	(Australia) Max Stewart	Rennmax BN3	England	2:01.3
8	(Australia) Tony Stewart	Dolphin 732	England	2:01.5
9	(Malaysia) Sonny Rajah	March 722	Hart	2:02.6
10	(Hong Kong) Albert Poon	Brabham BT40	Hart	2:03.0
11	(United States) Mike Hall	Brabham BT40	Hart	2:04.0
12	(Malaysia) Percy Chan	Lotus 69	RES	2:07.5
13	(Singapore) Jan Bussell	Palliser WDB4	BRM	2:07.6
14	(Indonesia) Hanny Wiano	GRD 272	Hart	2:08.9
15	(Japan) Kiyoshi Misaki	Brabham BT30	Toyota	2:11.1
16	(New Zealand) Steve Millen	Elden Mk. 8	Ford	2:12.7
17	(United States) Harvey Simon	Elfin 600B	Ford	2:13.6
18	(United States) John Green	Chevron B20	Hart	2:14.4
19	(New Zealand) Dave Hayward	Hawke	Ford	2:31.8
20	(Singapore) Chong Boon Seng	Brabham BT30		2:49.1

=== Race ===
Pos	Driver	Constructor	Laps	Time/Retired	Grid
1	(Australia) Vern Schuppan	March-Hart	50	1:38:58.3	2
2	(New Zealand) Graeme Lawrence	Surtees-Hart	50	+38.5	1
3	(Hong Kong) John MacDonald	Brabham-Hart	49	+1 lap	5
4	(Australia) Max Stewart	Rennmax-England	49	+1 lap	7
5	(Australia) Tony Stewart	Dolphin-England	49	+1 lap	8
6	(New Zealand) Ken Smith	March-Hart	47	+3 laps	4
7	(Singapore) Jan Bussell	Palliser-BRM	47	+3 laps	13
8	(New Zealand) Steve Millen	Elden-Ford	43	+7 laps	16
9	(Australia) Leo Geoghegan	Birrana-Hart	41	+9 laps	3
10	(United States) Harvey Simon	Elfin-Ford	40	+10 laps	17
?	(Malaysia) Percy Chan	Lotus-RES			12
?	(Indonesia) Hanny Wiano	GRD-Hart			14
?	(Japan) Kiyoshi Misaki	Brabham-Toyota			15
?	(United States) John Green	Chevron-Hart			18
?	(New Zealand) Dave Hayward	Hawke-Ford			19
?	(Singapore) Chong Boon Seng	Brabham			20
Ret	(Malaysia) Sonny Rajah	March-Hart	25	Battery	9
Ret	(Australia) Malcolm Ramsay	Birrana-Hart	17	Fuel tank	6
Ret	(United States) Mike Hall	Brabham-Hart	7	Radiator	11
DNS	(Hong Kong) Albert Poon	Brabham-Hart		Engine	10
DNS	(Canada) Brian Robertson	Brabham-Hart		Practice crash	—
DNS	(Indonesia) Robert Silitonga	GRD-Hart		Practice crash	—

Preceded by 1972 Singapore Grand Prix	Singapore Grand Prix; 1973	Succeeded by 2008 Singapore Grand Prix
