= Thompson Park =

Thompson Park may refer to:

== United Kingdom ==
- Thompson's Park, Cardiff, Wales
- Thompson Park (Burnley), Burnley, Lancashire, England

== United States ==
- Thompson Park (Lincroft, New Jersey), part of the Monmouth County Park System
- Thompson Park (Watertown, New York)
- Thompson Park (Charlotte, North Carolina)
- Thompson Park (Portland, Oregon)

== See also ==
- Thompson v Park (KB 408), a 1944 English law case concerning licenses in land
- Thomson Park (disambiguation)
