= 1972 Singapore Grand Prix =

Motor race

Race details
- Date: 2 April 1972

Fastest lap
Driver	Max Stewart	Mildren-Ford
- Time: 2m 0.80s

Podium
First	(Australia) Max Stewart	Mildren-Ford
Second	(Australia) Vern Schuppan	March-Ford
Third	(Australia) Bob Muir	Rennmax-Ford

The 1972 Singapore Grand Prix was a motor race held at the Thomson Road Grand Prix circuit in Singapore on 2 April 1972. The race, which was staged over 50 laps, was the seventh Singapore Grand Prix.

The race was won by Australian Max Stewart driving a Mildren-Ford.

== Race results ==
Pos	Driver	No.	Car	Laps	Race time
1	(Australia) Max Stewart	6	Mildren Ford	50	1h 43m 29.10s
2	(Australia) Vern Schuppan	129	March 722 Ford		
3	(Australia) Bob Muir	7	Rennmax BN3 Ford		
4	(Malaysia) Sonny Rajah	1	March 712M Ford		
?	(Hong Kong) John McDonald	11	Brabham BT36 Ford		
DNF	(Australia) Leo Geoghegan	12	Brabham BT30 Ford		
DNF	(Australia) Garrie Cooper	2	Elfin 600D Ford		
DNF	(Australia) Kevin Bartlett	5	Rennmax BN2 Ford		

Note: The above list is most likely incomplete.

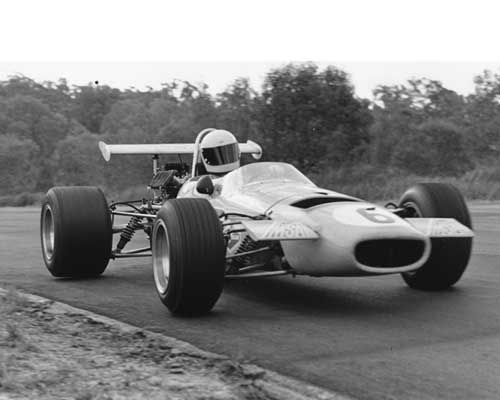
Max Stewart won the race driving a Mildren. The car is pictured at Lakeside Raceway in 1971.

Preceded by 1971 Singapore Grand Prix	Singapore Grand Prix; 1973	Succeeded by 1973 Singapore Grand Prix
