= Thomson Nature Park =

Nature park in Singapore

- Taman Alam Semulajadi Thomson (Malay) 汤申自然公园 (Chinese) தாம்சன் இயற்கை பூங்கா (Tamil)
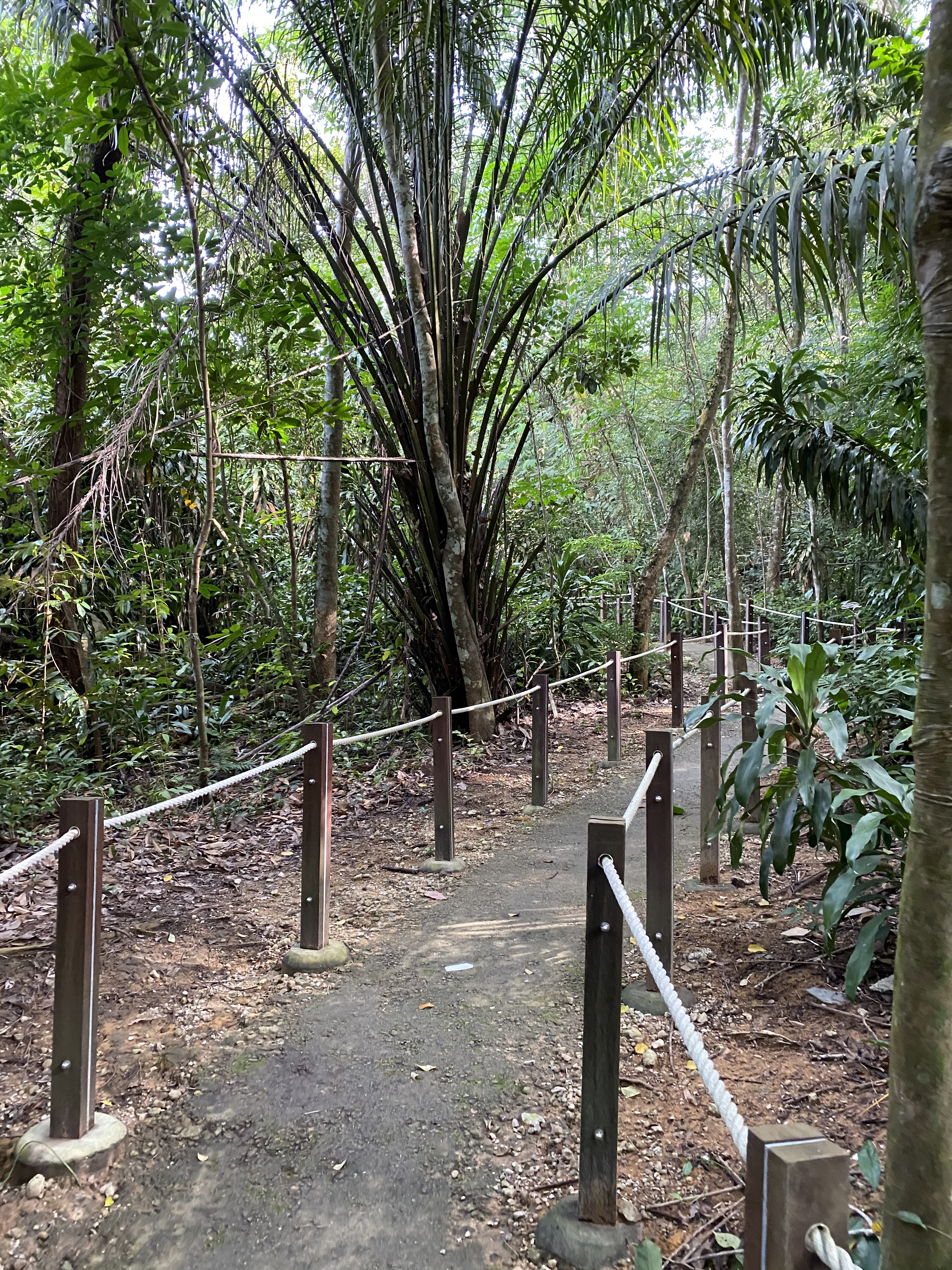
- Hiking trail in the park
- Interactive map of Thomson Nature Park
- Type: Nature park
- Location: Singapore
- Coordinates: 1.386471°N 103.821074°E
- Area: 50 hectares (120 acres)
- Opened: 12 October 2019; 7 years ago
- Operator: National Parks Board
- Status: Open

Thomson Nature Park is a nature park in Singapore. It is located adjacent to Central Catchment Nature Reserve near where the former Thomson Road Grand Prix circuit was held.

== Background ==
The park is on the site of a former Hainanese village which was established in the 1800s and abandoned in 1975. It is be about 50 hectares in size.

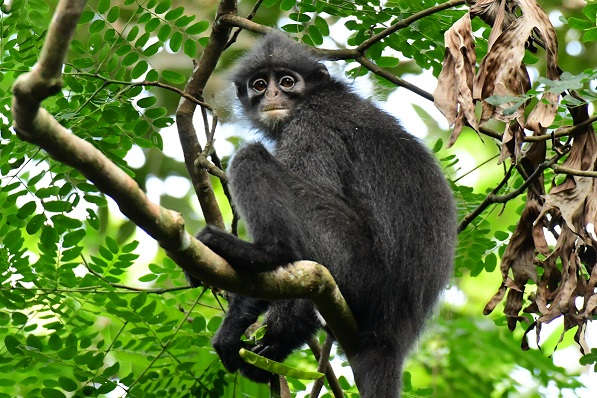
Thomson Nature Park is intended to assist with the conservation of the endemic Raffles' banded langur in Singapore.

One purpose of the park is to help conserve the biodiversity in the area. The park is one of five being developed in Singapore during the late 2010s near Central Catchment to increase the buffer between the park and the surrounding urban area and attract visitors who would otherwise visit the country's nature reserves. Fauna living in the forested areas of the park include the Sunda pangolin, the Malayan porcupine, the sambar deer, the leopard cat, the straw-headed bulbul, Malayan box turtle and the cinnamon frog. It is also intended to help conserve the Raffles' banded langur, a type of leaf monkey endemic to Singapore and Johor which is critically endangered within Singapore and whose small Singapore population often feeds in nearby forest. Trees in the park include several species of Ficus, angsana and common pulai. Besides enjoying nature, park visitors are able to see the remains of the Hainan village.

Groundbreaking of the project was marked by Singapore's Second Minister for National Development planting a Radermachera pinnata tree. According to Lee: "These buffer parks protect the Central Catchment (Nature Reserve) from fringe effects. If you have roads, development right up to the nature reserve, you will subject it to all the impacts of the urban setting...Having these nature parks near but not within the reserve will allow members of the public to enjoy the outdoors with their families and that takes pressure off our very precious nature reserve."

== Public access ==
Thomson Nature Park was first opened to the public on 12 October 2019. It has five trails spanning 3.8km into previous kampong and race track areas. It is Singapore's seventh nature park.

== Kampong routes ==
Besides the site of a deserted Hainan kampong, the trails in the park also covers extensive forest areas. One may encounter rich wildlife along the trails.

== See also ==
- Thomson Road Grand Prix circuit
