= 2008 Singapore Grand Prix =

15th round of the 2008 Formula One season

Coordinates: 1°17′22″N 103°51′32″E

Race 15 of 18 in the 2008 Formula One World Championship
← Previous race	Next race →
- Marina Bay Street Circuit

Race details
- Date: September 28, 2008
- Official name: 2008 Formula 1 SingTel Singapore Grand Prix
- Location: Marina Bay Street Circuit; Marina Bay, Singapore
- Course: Street Circuit
- Course length: 5.067 km (3.148 miles)
- Distance: 61 laps, 309.087 km (192.058 miles)
- Weather: Dry, Air Temp: 28 °C (82 °F), Wind Speed: 2.2 metres per second (7.2 ft/s), Humidity: 79%
- Attendance: 300,000 (3-Day Total); 100,000 (3-Day Average)

Pole position
Driver	(Brazil) Felipe Massa	Ferrari
- Time: 1:44.801

Fastest lap
Driver	(Finland) Kimi Räikkönen	Ferrari
- Time: 1:45.599 on lap 14 (lap record)

Podium
First	(Spain) Fernando Alonso	Renault
Second	(Germany) Nico Rosberg	Williams-Toyota
Third	(United Kingdom) Lewis Hamilton	McLaren-Mercedes

The 2008 Singapore Grand Prix, formally known as the 2008 Formula 1 SingTel Singapore Grand Prix, was a Formula One race held on 28 September 2008 at 20:00 SST at the newly built Marina Bay Street Circuit in Marina Bay, Singapore. It was the 15th race of the 2008 Formula One World Championship, the 800th Formula One World Championship race overall, and the first ever Formula One race held at night. This was also the first time Singapore hosted a Formula One race, as the last Singapore Grand Prix was a Formula Libre event in 1973.

The 61-lap race was won by Fernando Alonso for the Renault team from 15th on the grid after his teammate deliberately crashed on lap 14 to bring out the safety car after his first pit stop. Nico Rosberg claimed second in his Williams followed by McLaren's Lewis Hamilton. Felipe Massa of Ferrari started from pole position, but finished out of the points. Drivers' Championship leader Hamilton was second while reigning world champion Kimi Räikkönen qualified third. They continued in this order until Renault's Nelson Piquet Jr. deliberately crashed on lap 14, bringing out the safety car as planned after Alonso's pit stop. The leading drivers all pitted when the pit lane was opened. Massa prematurely left the pit box with his fuel hose still attached and dropped to last place.

Alonso, who had pitted before the safety car was deployed, subsequently took the lead and won the race. Nico Rosberg managed to finish second despite incurring a stop-go penalty and Hamilton completed the podium in third. Red Bull Racing's David Coulthard finished 7th, scoring the final points of his career. Kazuki Nakajima also scored his final points. The result saw Hamilton extend his lead in the Driver's standings to 7 points over Massa, who failed to score. McLaren also took over the lead in the Constructors' Championship by one point from Ferrari.

In September 2009, Renault F1 admitted in an FIA World Motor Sport Council meeting that Piquet had deliberately crashed per instructions from Renault team principal Flavio Briatore and chief engineer Pat Symonds in the hope of helping Alonso win. The Renault team were handed a disqualification from Formula One, which was suspended for two years pending any further rule infringements. Briatore was banned from all FIA-sanctioned events for life, while Symonds was banned for five years. Briatore and Symonds sued the FIA in French courts; on 5 January 2010, the Tribunal de Grande Instance overturned the ban which had been put in place on both men. Briatore would return to F1 in May 2024, again working for the Renault team, now re-branded as Alpine. Alonso has always maintained he knew nothing of the Symonds-Briatore plan.

== Report ==
=== Background ===
In early 2007, talks of staging a Formula One Grand Prix in Singapore began, with the focus on arranging this to be a night race in order to cater Formula One's audience in Europe. The race was approved in May and construction for the grand prix complex began in August 2007. The lighting system consisted of nearly 1600 light projectors, separated by four meters and suspended 10 meters above the track. The system generated a total of 3000 lux intensity, approximately four times the intensity used in a standard football stadium. The whole system required total of 108,423 meter cables and was connected to twelve twin-powered generators, generating estimated power of three megawatts.

At the previous race in Italy, Sebastian Vettel took his and Toro Rosso's maiden win in the wet race. Vettel became the youngest driver to win a Formula One race, aged 21 years and 73 days. Ferrari's Felipe Massa finished in sixth place, narrowing Lewis Hamilton's lead in the Drivers' Championship to a single point. They were followed by BMW Sauber's Robert Kubica and Massa's teammate Kimi Räikkönen. In the Constructors' Championship, Ferrari were in the lead with 134 points, followed by McLaren-Mercedes and BMW Sauber.

Due to the unusual time of the race, teams and drivers had to adapt their working hours by waking up at around midday local time, starting work around late afternoon, and staying up until 4am. Most drivers and teams praised the track after carrying out track inspections as well as arrangements undertaken by the track authorities. Concerns were raised about high bumps on kerbs of the Turn 10 chicane. Concerns were also expressed on safety measures needed in case of rain during the race.

=== Practice ===
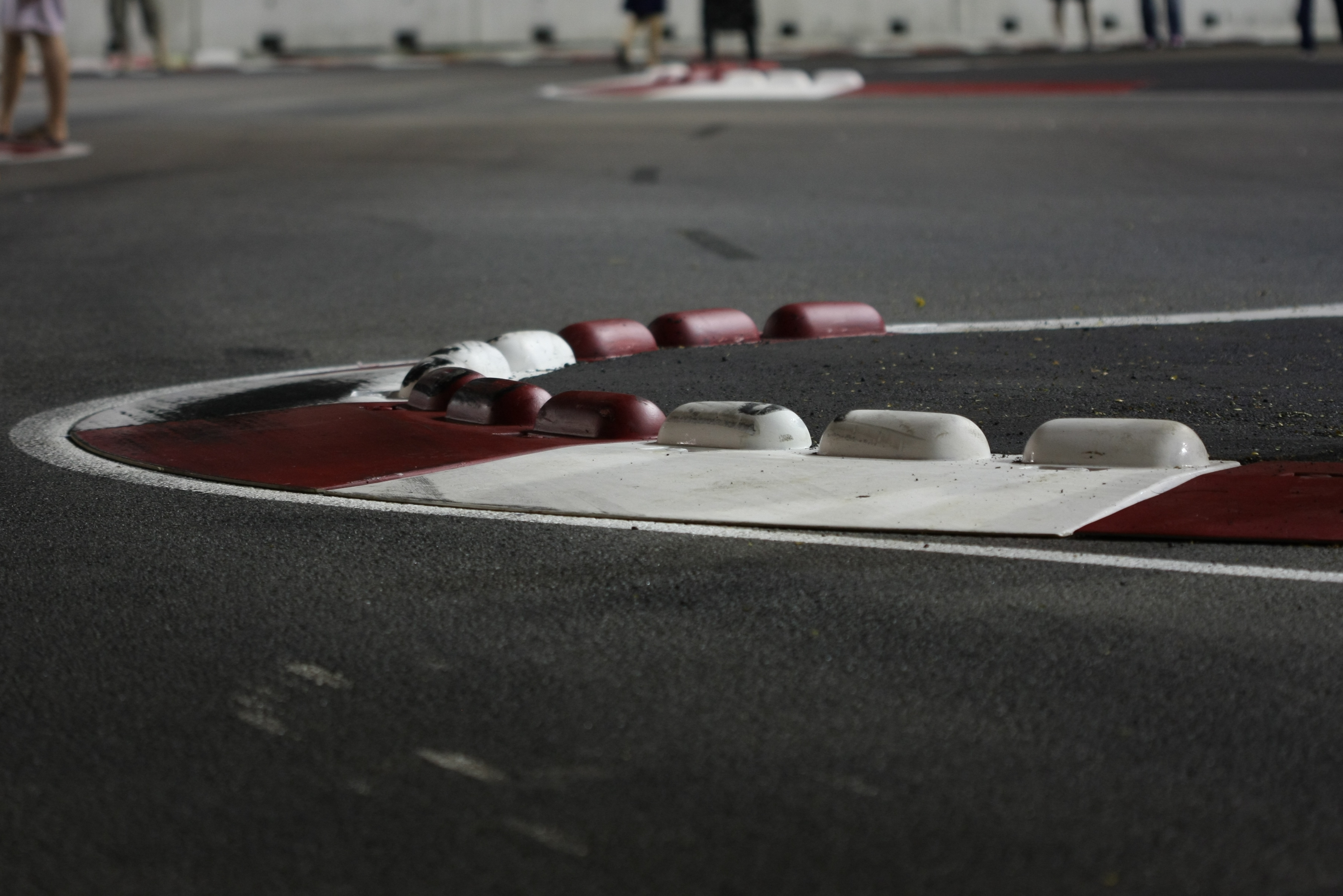
The controversial Turn 10 chicane kerbs

Hamilton set the fastest time in the first practice session on 26 September. He was followed by the Ferraris of Massa and Räikkönen and Hamilton's teammate Kovalainen. Red Bull's Mark Webber suffered a crash at Turn 18, damaging his front suspension. A number of drivers faced problems at the final corner of the circuit, including Honda's Rubens Barrichello who crashed backwards into the barriers. Toyota's Jarno Trulli also spun at this corner and subsequently made his way into the pits by driving in the wrong direction. Trulli was fined €10,000 for his misconduct.

Renault's Fernando Alonso was fastest in the second practice session, displacing Hamilton to second position with his final flying lap. The two were followed by Kovalainen, Massa and Nico Rosberg. During the session, Toro Rosso's Sébastien Bourdais almost collided with Nick Heidfeld's BMW Sauber as he exited from the pit lane into the first corner. In separate incidents, Timo Glock lost his front wing when he crashed into wall at Turn 7, Giancarlo Fisichella faced gearbox problems and Massa mistakenly took a wrong turn towards the escape road off the track.

Alonso was again the fastest man on the track in the final practice session, with Hamilton and Massa second and third respectively. Numerous drivers faced problems with bumps on the track, narrowly avoiding accidents. Fisichella damaged his Force India VJM01's front wing and suspension after it launched off the kerbs at the Turn 10 chicane.

=== Qualifying ===
I think first of all the car was just perfect, you know, so nice to drive smoothly and then I managed to do a perfect lap and that always helps when you have a good car and you don't make any single mistakes in whatever corner you go. That is always a great achievement.

— Felipe Massa, following his fifth pole of the year.

Räikkönen topped the first qualifying session, ahead of Kovalainen and Hamilton. Nelson Piquet Jr., Sébastien Bourdais, Rubens Barrichello, Adrian Sutil and Giancarlo Fisichella were eliminated in this session. Fisichella was unable to record a time during the session after he crashed into barriers at Turn 3 due to a punctured tyre. During his flying lap, Barrichello was impeded by Nick Heidfeld and subsequently entered the pits to abandon his lap. Heidfeld was dropped three grid places for blocking and Barrichello was fined €10,000 for an unsafe pit lane entry as he did not use the deceleration zone.

The second qualifying session was led by Felipe Massa, with Kovalainen and Räikkönen in second and third place. Hamilton barely managed to reach the third session, after a driving mistake during his penultimate run. Fernando Alonso was eliminated early in this session when his car suffered a fuel feed problem before he could set a lap time. The other drivers who failed to reach the top ten were Jarno Trulli, Jenson Button and both Red Bulls of Mark Webber and David Coulthard.

Massa took the pole position in the final session, with Hamilton, Räikkönen and Kubica completing first two rows of the grid. Massa secured his position by clocking lap time six-tenths faster than Hamilton, describing it as his best qualifying result of the season. Kovalainen, managing fifth position, rued his tyre selections in the final session. Kovalainen, Heidfeld, Vettel and Glock occupied the third and fourth rows of the grid while the Williams' of Rosberg and Nakajima completed the top ten.

=== Race ===
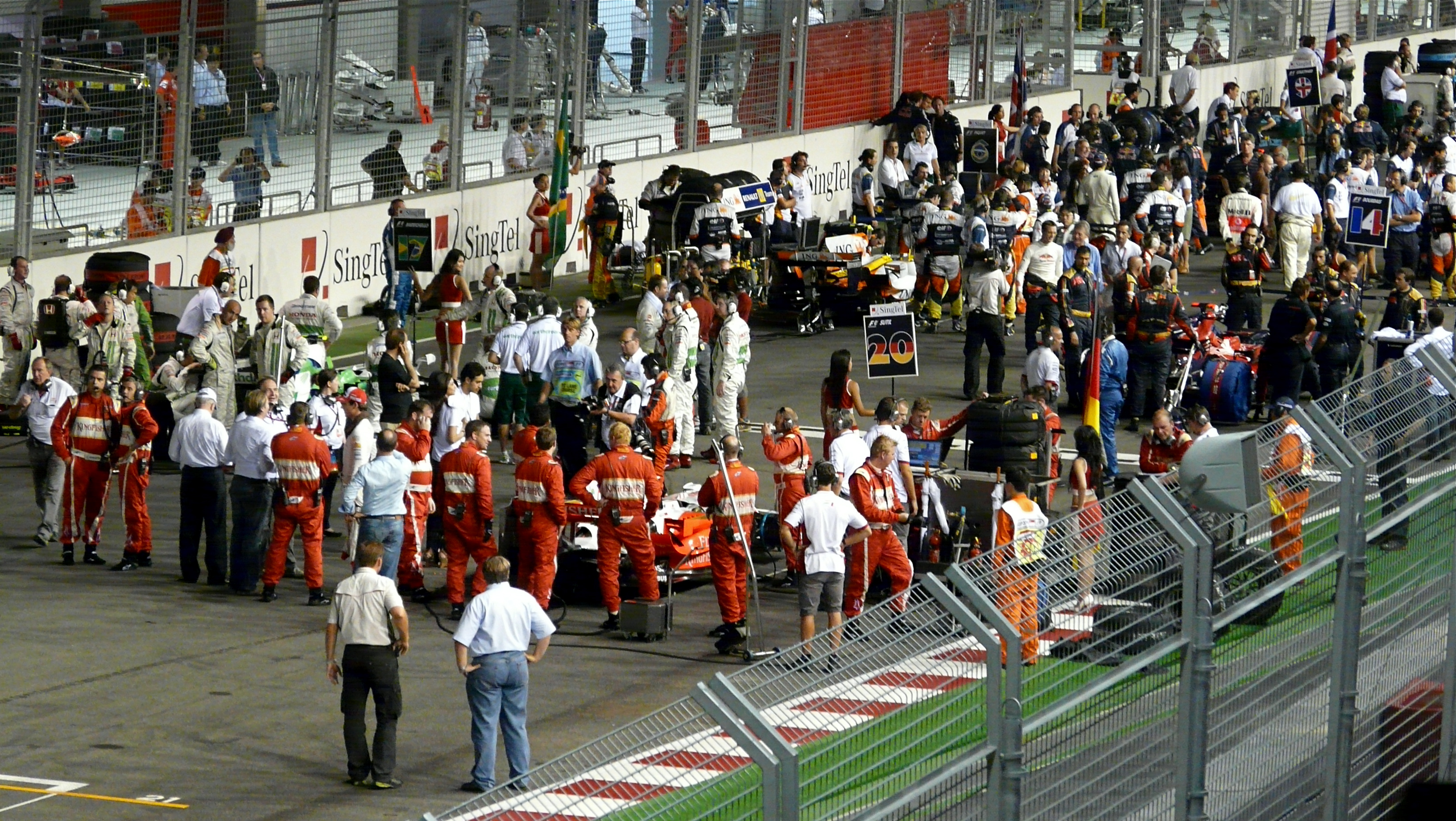
Just before the race

The race began at 20:00 SST. During the warm-up lap, Piquet spun out at Turn 23, but immediately recovered and took his position on the grid. At the start, Massa, championship rival Hamilton and Räikkönen all got through the first sequence of corners safely and retained their positions. Kubica and Kovalainen made contact at Turn 3, causing Kovalainen to lose two places to Vettel and Glock. Heidfeld and Alonso cut the first corner but they did not receive any penalty. Massa began to edge away from Hamilton, who in turn was pulling away from Räikkönen. Jarno Trulli had begun the race on a heavy fuel load, and soon was holding up a number of cars with Williams's Nico Rosberg immediately behind him. It was not until the seventh lap that Rosberg finally passed Trulli's Toyota, and soon Nakajima and Alonso got through as well.

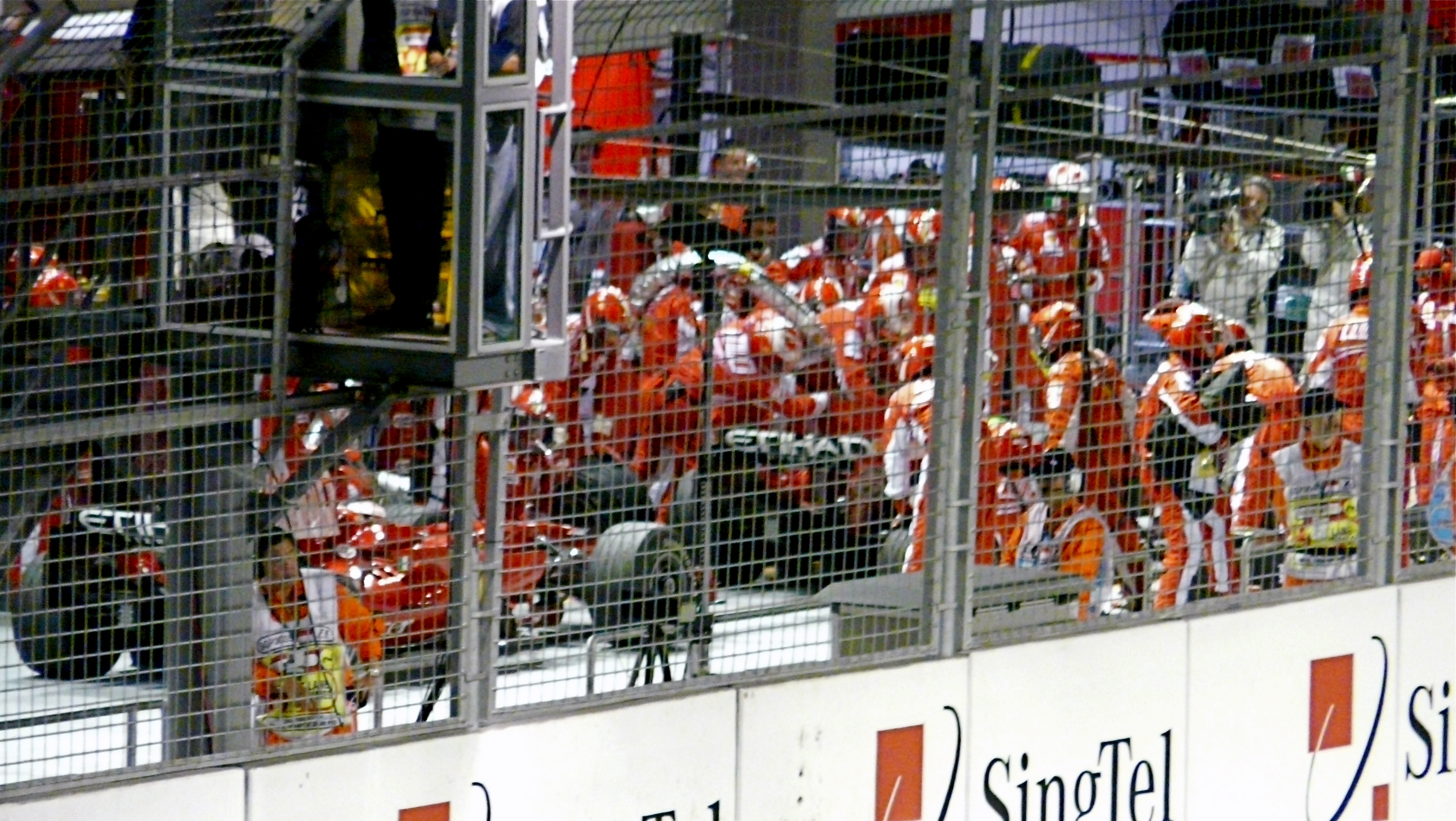
Ferrari mechanics work on Felipe Massa's car during the safety car period while teammate Kimi Räikkönen waits behind him. The Brazilian was released with the fuel hose still attached to his car and nearly collided with Adrian Sutil.

After ten laps, Massa had built up a lead of over three seconds to Hamilton and Räikkönen was a further seven seconds behind Hamilton. On lap twelve, Alonso was the first driver who came into the pits. He switched his super-soft tyres for the soft compound tyres and rejoined at the back of the field. Two laps later, teammate Piquet lost control of his car and hit the wall at Turn 17, blaming his hard tyres for the accident. This resulted in the first safety car period of the race. The two Red Bull cars and Rubens Barrichello managed to come into the pits before it was closed. With very little fuel left, Rosberg and Kubica had no choice but to pit despite the pit lane being closed. Barrichello's Honda then had a mechanical failure and became the second retirement of the race. After all the cars were behind the safety car, the pit lane was opened and nearly all the drivers pitted.

In the pits, Ferrari prematurely released Massa with the fuel hose still attached to the car. The Brazilian was also released into the path of Adrian Sutil, who narrowly avoided the Ferrari. Massa went the full length of the pitlane before stopping just before the exit. Massa rejoined at the back of the field after the Ferrari mechanics ran down the pitlane and removed the hose from the car. Cars who had either pitted before the safety car or were on one stop strategies were now in front. Rosberg now led from Trulli, Fisichella, Kubica, Alonso, Webber, Coulthard and Hamilton.

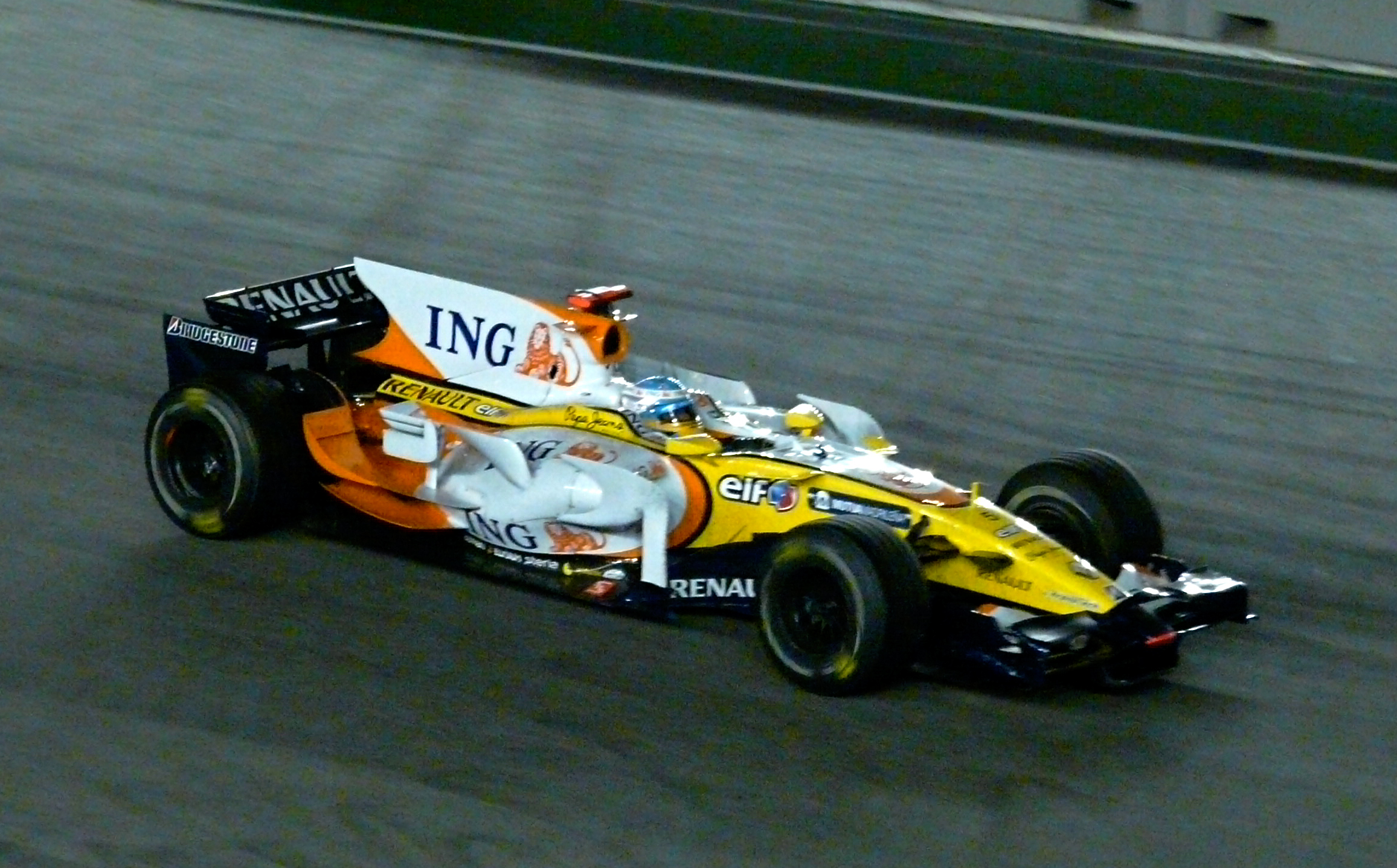
Despite qualifying down in fifteenth, Fernando Alonso took full advantage of pitting before the safety car period and his rivals' misfortunes, to take victory at the inaugural Singapore Grand Prix.

Rosberg started to pull away from the heavily fuelled Trulli and Fisichella's Force India, who held up most of the field behind him. In the next few laps, Felipe Massa was given a drive through penalty for an unsafe release from the pits while Rosberg and Kubica were given 10 second stop-go penalties for refuelling when the pitlane was closed. The Ferrari driver served his penalty and rejoined the track still in last place. Kubica came into the pits from fourth and dropped behind Massa. After building a lead of over fifteen seconds to Trulli, Rosberg served his penalty a lap later but only lost three positions. He rejoined the circuit in fourth behind Alonso and Jarno Trulli took over the lead.

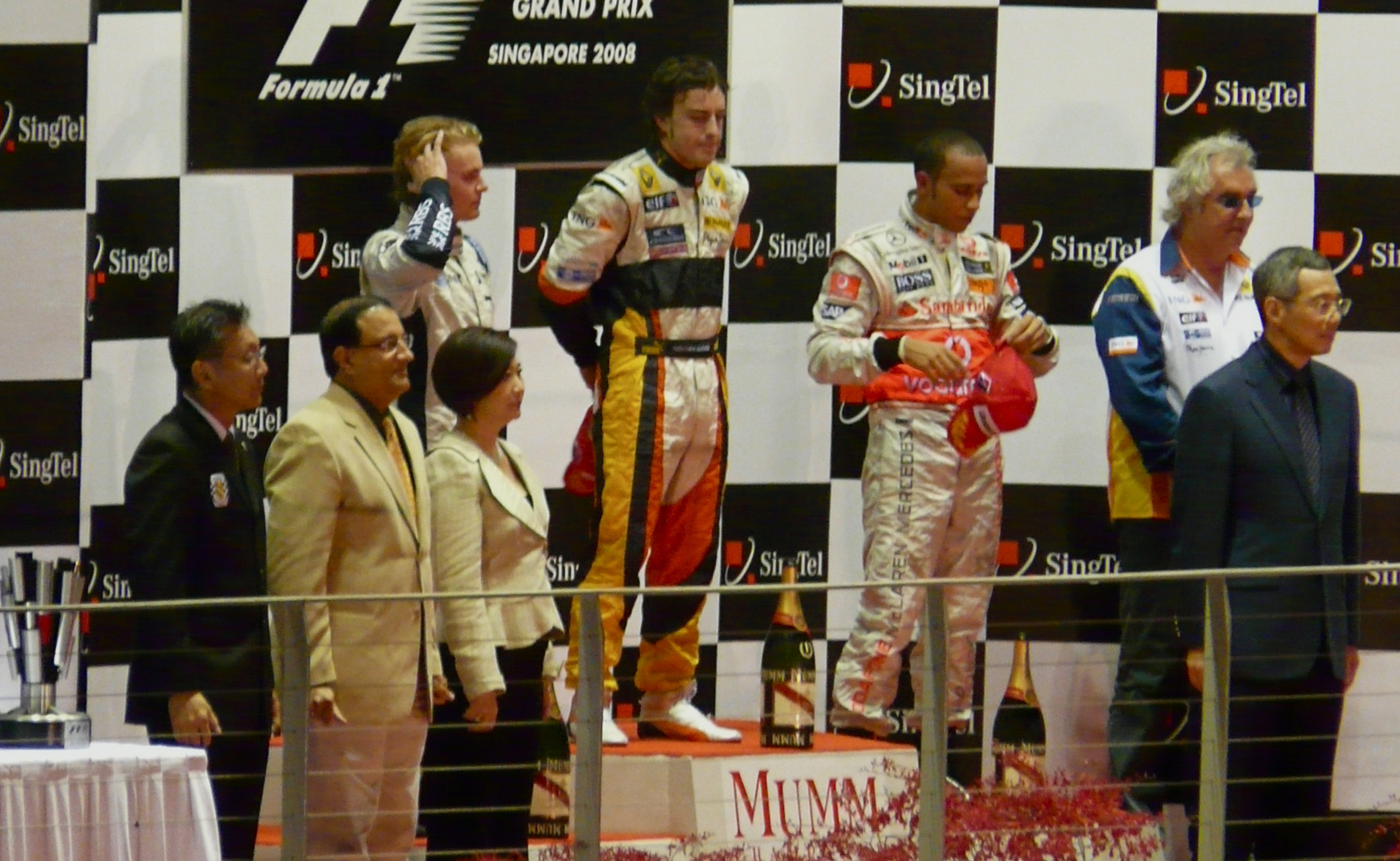
The podium, (left to right): Rosberg celebrates his best Grand Prix finish up to that point, Alonso takes the top step of the podium for the first time since the 2007 Italian Grand Prix and Hamilton settles for third to extend his lead in the Drivers' Championship.

A lap later, Fisichella came in from second to make his only pit stop, moving Alonso and Rosberg into second and third. Trulli led the race for four more laps before making his only stop of the night, handing the lead to Alonso. He soon pulled away from Rosberg who pitted from second on lap 41, rejoining in seventh. Alonso made his final stop a lap later but still rejoined in the lead, just ahead of second and third placed Coulthard and Hamilton. Coulthard lost momentum and the McLaren overtook the Red Bull at turn seven. At the end of the lap, both cars pitted and Coulthard nearly left with his fuel hose attached.

Mark Webber retired on lap 29 with a gearbox issue. His team Red Bull Racing later claimed that a momentary electrical surge caused by a passing underground tram made the gearbox select two gears at once. The incident occurred in Turn 13. A tram line goes right underneath that section of the race track. These allegations were later denied by the city-state's railway operator.

After 45 laps, Alonso led Timo Glock by just over six seconds and Rosberg by a further eleven seconds in third. The Toyota driver pitted two laps later, rejoining in fifth. Four laps later, Trulli began to slow down and soon retired after a mechanical failure. On the same lap, Räikkönen made his second and final stop of the race and rejoined in fifth. A lap later, Massa spun at Turn 18 and lightly tapped the tyre wall without sustaining much damage. Moments later, Sutil fell victim to the same corner and damaged his front suspension, becoming the fifth retirement of the night. The incident brought out the second safety car period of the race.

The safety car withdrew from the circuit with nine laps remaining and Alonso pulled away from Rosberg and Hamilton. Glock, Räikkönen, Vettel, Heidfeld and Coulthard (ultimately, claiming points for the final time) were in the remaining points positions. Rosberg was coming under pressure from Hamilton, who was looking to capitalize on Massa's incidents. With four laps remaining, Räikkönen bounced off the kerbs at the Turn 10 chicane and crashed into the barriers while chasing Glock, promoting Nakajima into the points. Alonso maintained his lead over Rosberg and took his first win for Renault since his return to the team. Rosberg held on to second and Hamilton settled for third. Massa finished in 13th place and the points difference between himself and Hamilton increased to seven points and McLaren took over the lead in the Constructors' Championship. With teammate Räikkönen failing to finish, this was the first time the Ferrari team had failed to score any points in a race since the 2006 Australian Grand Prix. Räikkönen recorded his tenth fastest lap of the season during the race, tying his own record that he shared with Michael Schumacher. Heidfeld broke Schumacher's record, being classified for the 25th consecutive race.

=== Post-race ===
A first podium of the season and first victory as well and I am extremely happy. I cannot believe it right now, I think I need a couple of days to realise we won a race this year. It seems impossible all through the season to be close to the top guys and here suddenly we have been competitive from Friday. Obviously we started at the back and the first safety car helped me a lot and I was able to win the race.

— Fernando Alonso, speaking after his first win of the year.

Fernando Alonso credited his success to the team's strategy and bit of luck. He said that the team chose a two-stop strategy with a short initial stint as opposed to a one-stop strategy, considering the difficulties of overtaking on the track and possibility of brake problems. Nico Rosberg was pleased with his career best result, although he recalled when he thought his efforts for a good finish might have been in vain after being given a stop-and-go penalty. He mentioned that he had to come in for the pit stops on the same lap that the safety car came out, and admitted that he was annoyed with the penalty. Hamilton said that he tried to get close to Rosberg towards the final laps, after the second safety car period; however, seeing that overtaking was extremely risky, he decided against it, considering that neither of the Ferraris was going to score.

Ferrari team principal Stefano Domenicali said that the reason for Massa's pit incident was not the electronic signalling system but a human error. He defended the electronic system saying that the system saves any reaction time for the driver as opposed to a standard "lollipop" system, and considering it was a human error, the incident may have happened with a lollipop as well.

Toyota filed a protest against Toro Rosso for releasing Sebastian Vettel in Timo Glock's path during their first pit stops under the safety car; however, the stewards rejected Toyota's plea.

In the Drivers' Championship, Lewis Hamilton's third place moved him seven points clear of Felipe Massa on 84 points. With both Ferrari drivers failing to score, McLaren took over the lead in the Constructors' Championship on 135 points. Fernando Alonso's victory meant that Renault overtook Toyota for fourth place in the constructors standings.

== Reactions ==
The international media and many of those directly involved in Formula One praised the staging of the SingTel Singapore Grand Prix highly. Fears which were previously expressed about the weather, visibility, and narrow nature of the circuit itself all proved unfounded. Organisation of the event itself was widely deemed to be impeccable as the ushering, transport, and security services all ran like clockwork. However, the drivers complained about how bumpy the track was, particularly off the racing line, which made overtaking difficult on a street circuit hemmed in by barriers.

Formula One's then-commercial rights holder Bernie Ecclestone heralded the Singapore Grand Prix as the "new jewel in the Formula One sports crown", a phrase often used to describe the Monaco Grand Prix circuit. He described Singapore as an example to follow and would make people reconsider their opinions of Asia.

For years I've been saying go East, not West. When you think about it, most parts of Asia where people have visited, they sort of put everything in one basket – 'Singapore is the same as India, Malaysia and Thailand'. That's how they feel because they don't know any better. Hopefully this will open people's eyes and they'll say, my God, Singapore really is alive and well.

— Commercial rights holder Bernie Ecclestone

Several other prominent Formula One personalities were quoted as saying:

The guys here have done an absolutely unbelievable job. The effort that has gone into this circuit in the last 12 months is nothing short of phenomenal. I think of the spectacle of a night race, but not only have we got a night race, we have also got a great circuit, a really challenging circuit. They have just raised the bar considerably for a new circuit and the spectacle of racing at night in a big city such as Singapore is really exciting.

— Red Bull racing team principal Christian Horner

It has a good chance of challenging Monaco for being the jewel in the crown of Formula One. That is the most accurate thing to say. They have great weather, a very good track and the grandstands packed. I think there is a lot of enthusiasm out there.

— Williams team boss Sir Frank Williams

It is not just a new experience, it is a real big step in the history of grand prix racing because it has been done so well. Everything has been proven now and we can take this model and apply it to anywhere in the world – either to bring to Europe the race at a time when people watch it, or even within Europe to make it more spectacular.

— McLaren Group chairman Ron Dennis

I think it is a big, big step forward for Formula One. The pictures, the atmosphere is really one of a kind and this gives a completely new experience to all the viewers worldwide but also to the spectators. That is very positive and the whole scenery I think is unreal. It is like in a movie and I think it is a big, big step. I think Bernie pushed very hard, so thanks to him.

— Mercedes Motorsport chief Norbert Haug

The most impressive thing for me is what an amazing job they have done here in Singapore to prepare the circuit. I cannot particularly fault it. I think they did a tremendous job, so I feel everyone deserves a real pat on the back because it is really impressive.

— McLaren F1 driver Lewis Hamilton

Of course, when you race on a track that would work better as a circus rink or something along those lines, anything can happen, because the real show was put on yesterday by the safety car. This is humiliating for the F1 world. During the next few weeks, I would like discuss this with all the other teams.

— Ferrari president Luca di Montezemolo

Locally, Sunday's Formula One night race on the local MediaCorp TV Channel 5 drew more viewers than the Beijing Olympics opening ceremony in the previous month, becoming the highest-rated programme for the year. The average ratings for Sunday's race were 17.8 per cent, or 789,000 viewers, as compared to 17.3 per cent (765,000 viewers) for the opening of the Beijing Games. The world's inaugural Formula One race under floodlights is reported to have been watched by an estimated global TV audience of about 400 million.

== FIA investigation and aftermath ==
During the race, Renault F1 driver Nelson Piquet Jr. crashed on lap 15, which at the time he attributed to how difficult the car was to drive on heavy fuel. At the time, his Renault teammate Fernando Alonso was one of four drivers to have pitted for fuel (the other three being the Honda of Rubens Barrichello, and the two Red Bulls of Mark Webber and David Coulthard), hindering all others who have not, thus facilitating Fernando Alonso's victory at the end of the race. After Piquet, Jr. left Renault in August 2009, allegations surfaced that this crash had been deliberate, to give an advantage to Alonso. Following a Fédération Internationale de l'Automobile (FIA) investigation in which Piquet, Jr. stated he had been ordered by Renault team principal Flavio Briatore and engineer Pat Symonds to stage the crash, on 4 September 2009 Renault were charged with conspiracy and race fixing, and were due to face the FIA World Motor Sport Council in Paris on 21 September 2009. Initially, Renault and Briatore stated they would take legal action against Piquet, Jr. for making false allegations; before the 21 September meeting, Renault announced they would not contest the charges and that Briatore and Symonds had left the team.

In 2023, in an interview for The Mirror, Bernie Ecclestone said both he, and then-FIA President Max Mosley were made aware of what happened during the 2008 season. "Piquet Jr had told his father Nelson that he had been asked by the team to deliberately drive into the wall at a certain point in time in order to trigger a safety car phase and help his team-mate Alonso. We decided not to do anything for the time being. We wanted to protect the sport and save it from a huge scandal." He added: "There was a rule at the time that a world championship ranking was untouchable after the FIA awards ceremony at the end of the year. So Hamilton was presented with the world championship trophy and everything was fine." Due to this, it is his belief that Felipe Massa should have been the F1 drivers' world champion in 2008 and not Lewis Hamilton.

Following Ecclestone's comments, Massa was reported to have begun investigating whether he could take legal action to dispute the outcome of the 2008 world championship. Lewis Hamilton led the championship by one point going into the Singapore race, and emerged with a 7-point lead. Given that Hamilton eventually won the championship by one point with an overtake on Timo Glock in Brazil, Massa argues that Crashgate ultimately cost him the title. Former FIA president Jean Todt also backed Massa's claims suggesting the FIA should have cancelled the results of the race as soon as the allegations of race fixing first came to light in 2009.

== Classification ==
=== Qualifying ===
Pos	No	Driver	Constructor	Part 1	Part 2	Part 3	Grid
1	2	(Brazil) Felipe Massa	Ferrari	1:44.519	1:44.014	1:44.801	1
2	22	(United Kingdom) Lewis Hamilton	McLaren-Mercedes	1:44.501	1:44.932	1:45.465	2
3	1	(Finland) Kimi Räikkönen	Ferrari	1:44.282	1:44.232	1:45.617	3
4	4	(Poland) Robert Kubica	BMW Sauber	1:44.740	1:44.519	1:45.779	4
5	23	(Finland) Heikki Kovalainen	McLaren-Mercedes	1:44.311	1:44.207	1:45.873	5
6	3	(Germany) Nick Heidfeld	BMW Sauber	1:45.548	1:44.520	1:45.964	9^{3}
7	15	(Germany) Sebastian Vettel	Toro Rosso-Ferrari	1:45.042	1:44.261	1:46.244	6
8	12	(Germany) Timo Glock	Toyota	1:45.184	1:44.441	1:46.328	7
9	7	(Germany) Nico Rosberg	Williams-Toyota	1:45.103	1:44.429	1:46.611	8
10	8	(Japan) Kazuki Nakajima	Williams-Toyota	1:45.127	1:44.826	1:47.547	10
11	11	(Italy) Jarno Trulli	Toyota	1:45.642	1:45.038		11
12	16	(United Kingdom) Jenson Button	Honda	1:45.660	1:45.133		12
13	10	(Australia) Mark Webber	Red Bull-Renault	1:45.493	1:45.212		13
14	9	(United Kingdom) David Coulthard	Red Bull-Renault	1:46.028	1:45.298		14
15	5	(Spain) Fernando Alonso	Renault	1:44.971	No time^{2}		15
16	6	(Brazil) Nelson Piquet Jr.	Renault	1:46.037			16
17	14	(France) Sébastien Bourdais	Toro Rosso-Ferrari	1:46.389			17
18	17	(Brazil) Rubens Barrichello	Honda	1:46.583			18
19	20	(Germany) Adrian Sutil	Force India-Ferrari	1:47.940			19
20	21	(Italy) Giancarlo Fisichella	Force India-Ferrari	No time^{1}			20

Notes

- ^1 – Giancarlo Fisichella did not set a time in Q1 after he crashed into barriers at Turn 3 due to a punctured tyre.
- ^2 – Fernando Alonso did not set a time in Q2 due to fuel pump problems.
- ^3 – Nick Heidfeld was penalised three grid positions for impeding Rubens Barrichello during first qualifying session.

=== Race ===
Pos	No	Driver	Constructor	Laps	Time/Retired	Grid	Points
1	5	(Spain) Fernando Alonso	Renault	61	1:57:16.304	15	10
2	7	(Germany) Nico Rosberg	Williams-Toyota	61	+2.957	8	8
3	22	(United Kingdom) Lewis Hamilton	McLaren-Mercedes	61	+5.917	2	6
4	12	(Germany) Timo Glock	Toyota	61	+8.155	7	5
5	15	(Germany) Sebastian Vettel	Toro Rosso-Ferrari	61	+10.268	6	4
6	3	(Germany) Nick Heidfeld	BMW Sauber	61	+11.101	9	3
7	9	(United Kingdom) David Coulthard	Red Bull-Renault	61	+16.387	14	2
8	8	(Japan) Kazuki Nakajima	Williams-Toyota	61	+18.489	10	1
9	16	(United Kingdom) Jenson Button	Honda	61	+19.885	12	
10	23	(Finland) Heikki Kovalainen	McLaren-Mercedes	61	+26.902	5	
11	4	(Poland) Robert Kubica	BMW Sauber	61	+27.975	4	
12	14	(France) Sébastien Bourdais	Toro Rosso-Ferrari	61	+29.432	17	
13	2	(Brazil) Felipe Massa	Ferrari	61	+35.170	1	
14	21	(Italy) Giancarlo Fisichella	Force India-Ferrari	61	+43.571	PL^{4}	
15	1	(Finland) Kimi Räikkönen	Ferrari	57	Accident	3	
Ret	11	(Italy) Jarno Trulli	Toyota	50	Hydraulics	11	
Ret	20	(Germany) Adrian Sutil	Force India-Ferrari	49	Accident	19	
Ret	10	(Australia) Mark Webber	Red Bull-Renault	29	Electrics	13	
Ret	17	(Brazil) Rubens Barrichello	Honda	14	Engine	18	
Ret	6	(Brazil) Nelson Piquet Jr.	Renault	13	Crash	16	

Notes

- ^4 – Giancarlo Fisichella started the race from the pit lane.

== Championship standings after the race ==
Drivers' Championship standings

Pos.	Driver	Points
1	(United Kingdom) Lewis Hamilton*	84
2	(Brazil) Felipe Massa*	77
3	(Poland) Robert Kubica*	64
4	(Finland) Kimi Räikkönen*	57
5	(Germany) Nick Heidfeld*	56

Constructors' Championship standings

	Pos.	Constructor	Points
1	1	(United Kingdom) McLaren-Mercedes*	135
1	2	(Italy) Ferrari*	134
	3	(Germany) BMW Sauber*	120
1	4	(France) Renault	51
1	5	(Japan) Toyota	46

- Note: Only the top five positions are included for both sets of standings.
- Bold text and an asterisk indicates competitors who still had a theoretical chance of becoming World Champion.

Previous race: 2008 Italian Grand Prix	FIA Formula One World Championship; 2008 season	Next race: 2008 Japanese Grand Prix
Previous race: 1973 Singapore Grand Prix	Singapore Grand Prix	Next race: 2009 Singapore Grand Prix
Awards
Preceded by 2007 United States Grand Prix	Formula One Promotional Trophy for Race Promoter; 2008	Succeeded by 2009 Abu Dhabi Grand Prix
Preceded by HANS Device	Autosport; Pioneering and Innovation Award; 2008	Succeeded by F1 in Schools
