= List of Macau Grand Prix winners =

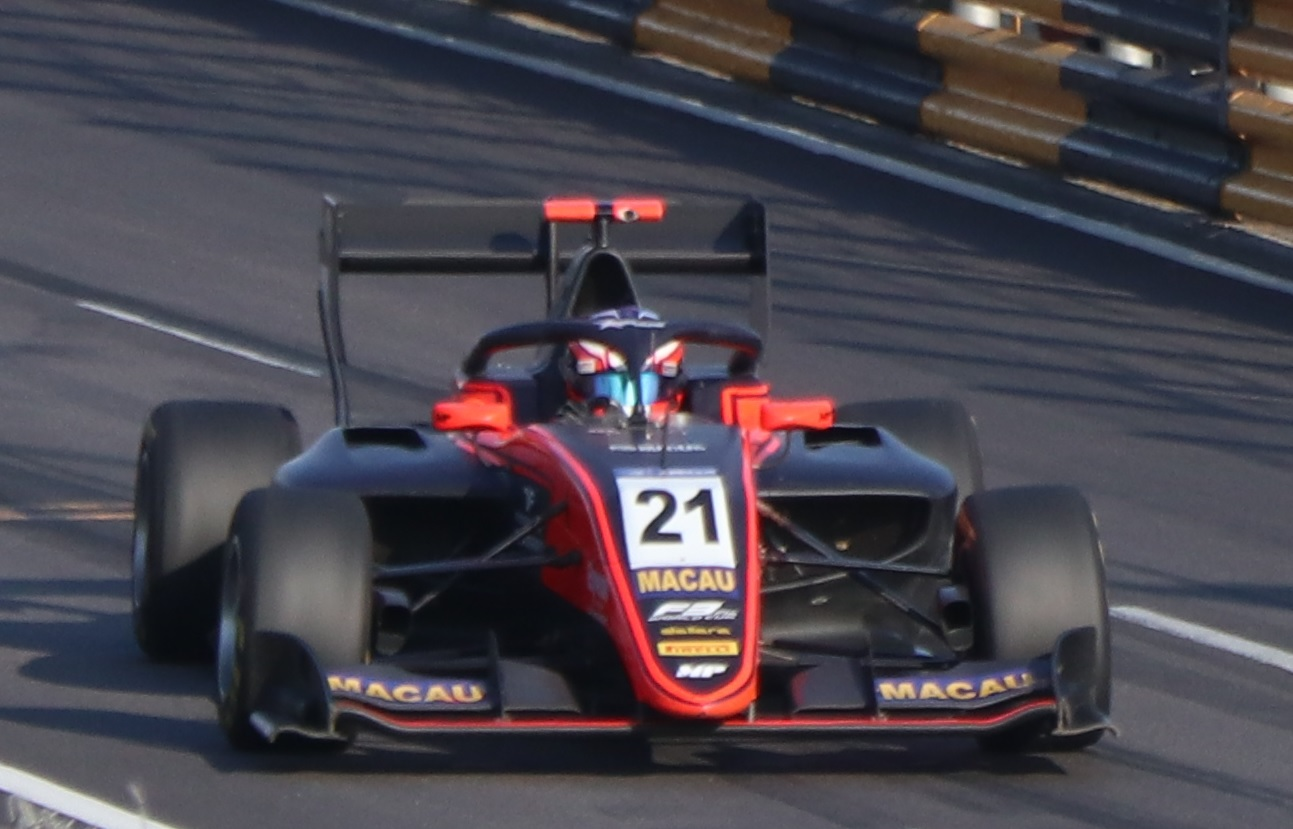
Richard Verschoor won the 2019 edition of the Macau Grand Prix.

The Macau Grand Prix (Portuguese: Grande Prémio de Macau; Chinese: 澳門格蘭披治大賽車) is an annual single seater car race held on the Guia Circuit in Macau's streets on the third or fourth weekend of November. It was founded in 1954 by Fernando Macedo Pinto, Carlos da Silva and Paulo Antas as a local treasure hunt for car enthusiasts in the Pearl River Delta territory, but Swiss expatriate Paul Dutoit suggested that the route be used for local professional motor races. The race has variously been held to sports car, Formula Libre, Formula Pacific, Formula 3 (F3), Formula 4 (F4) and Formula Regional (FR) regulations throughout its history, and drivers consider it an event to progress to higher class series such as Formula One. The event is composed of two races: a ten-lap qualifying race to decide the starting order for the fifteen-lap main event. Each winner is presented with a trophy at a ceremony on a podium following the conclusion of both events and the final results of the main race determines the winner. (Note: Before that, the overall winner was determined over two 15-lap legs. When the Grand Prix was held to Formula Atlantic rules, it was always staged over one leg.)

John MacDonald holds the record for the most Macau Grand Prix victories with four. Jan Bussell, António Félix da Costa, Arsenio Laurel, Geoff Lees, Edoardo Mortara, Riccardo Patrese, Felix Rosenqvist and Dan Ticktum are the eight drivers to have won the race twice. Six drivers have won the race twice in succession but none have claimed three or more consecutive victories. Laurel was the first driver to achieve consecutive victories when he won the 1962 and 1963 races. MacDonald holds the record for the longest period of time between two race victories–seven years between the 1965 and 1972 events. He also has the record for the longest period of time between his first Grand Prix win and his last–ten years between the 1965 and 1975 iterations. It has been won by British drivers 16 times, followed by Hong Kong racers with 9 wins and Italian competitors, French racers and drivers from Macau have taken 5 victories each. Theodore Racing have the highest number of victories of any team under all six regulations the race has been held to with 9, followed by Team TOM'S with 5. Ticktum is the race's youngest winner; he was 18 years and 5 months old when he won the 2017 race.

As of the 2026 edition, there have been 60 race winners in the 73 editions of the event. The race's first winner was the local driver Eduardo de Carvalho at the 1954 sports car event, and the most recent competitor to achieve their first victory in the territory was Kean Nakamura-Berta of Great Britain who took his first win in the 2026 FR race. Hon Chio Leong was the first local driver to win the Grand Prix twice in succession in the 2020 and 2021 F4 events. The first competitor to win the event held to F3 regulations was the Brazilian driver Ayrton Senna for the West Surrey Racing team in the 1983 edition. Winners of the qualifying races, the support events and the Macau motorcycle Grand Prix are not included in this list.

== Winners ==
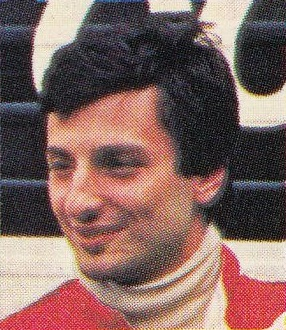
Riccardo Patrese won the Macau Grand Prix twice in succession in 1976 and 1977.

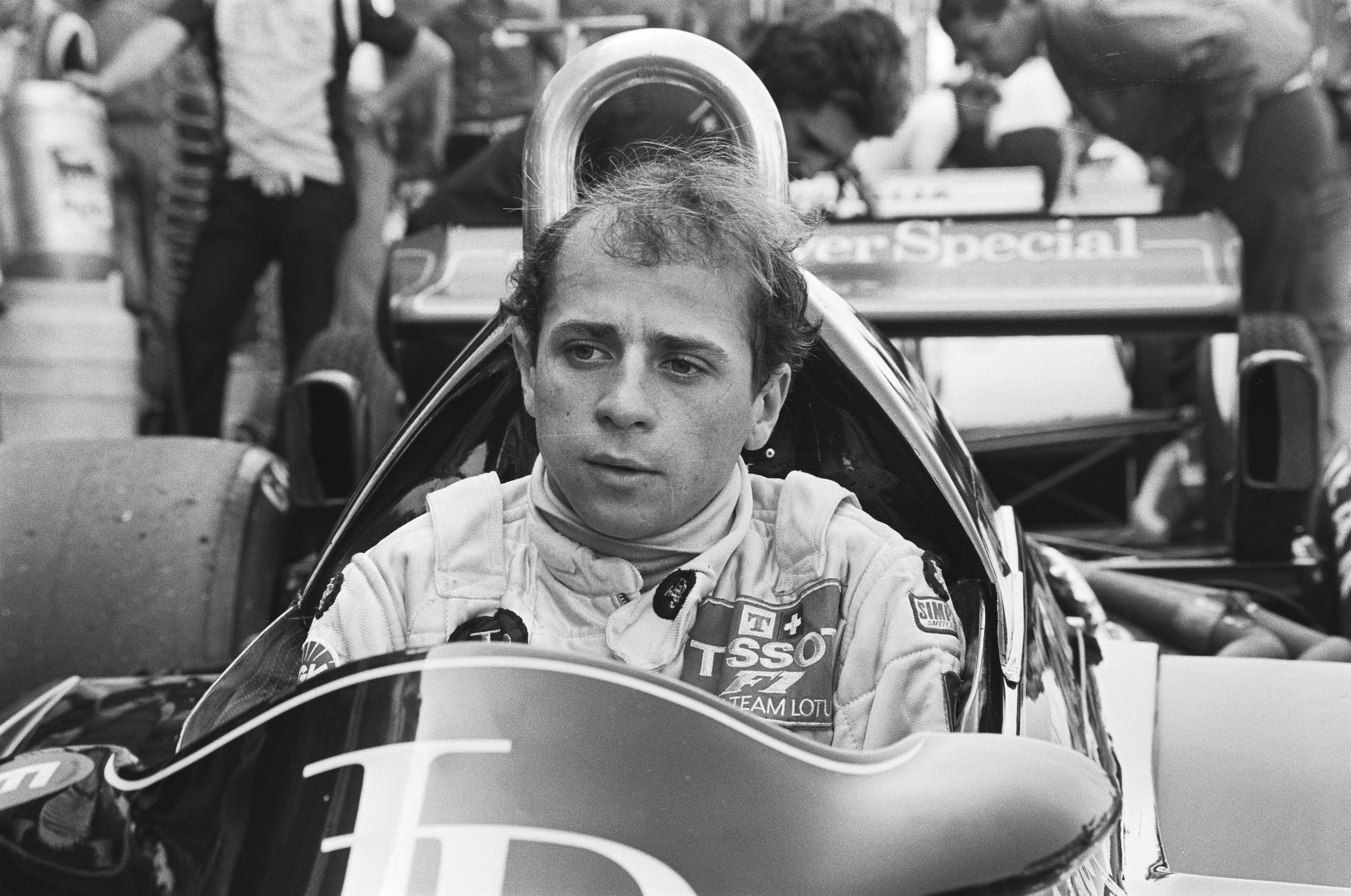
Roberto Moreno won the final Macau Grand Prix to be held to Formula Pacific rules in 1982.

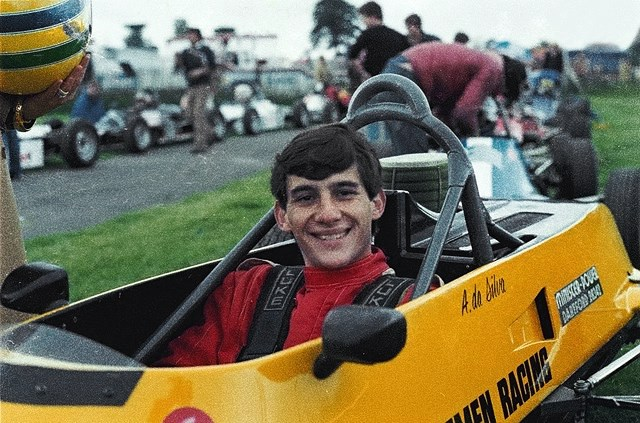
Ayrton Senna was the first winner of the Macau Grand Prix staged to Formula 3 rules in 1983.

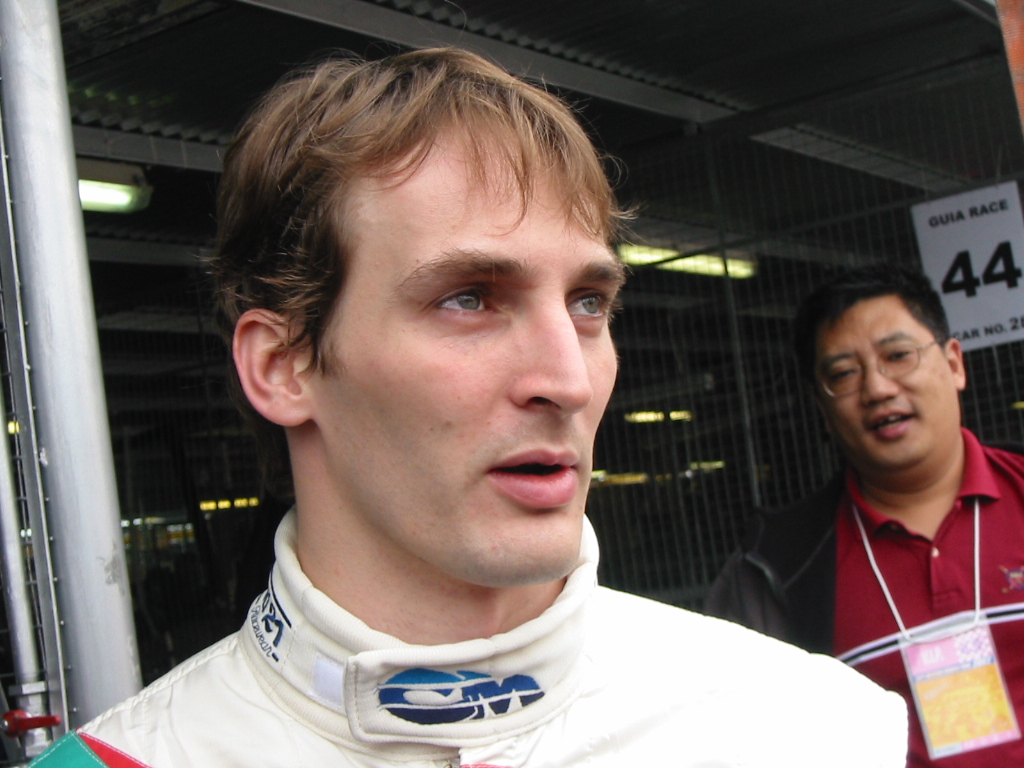
André Couto was the first Macanese driver to win the event under Formula 3 rules in 2000.

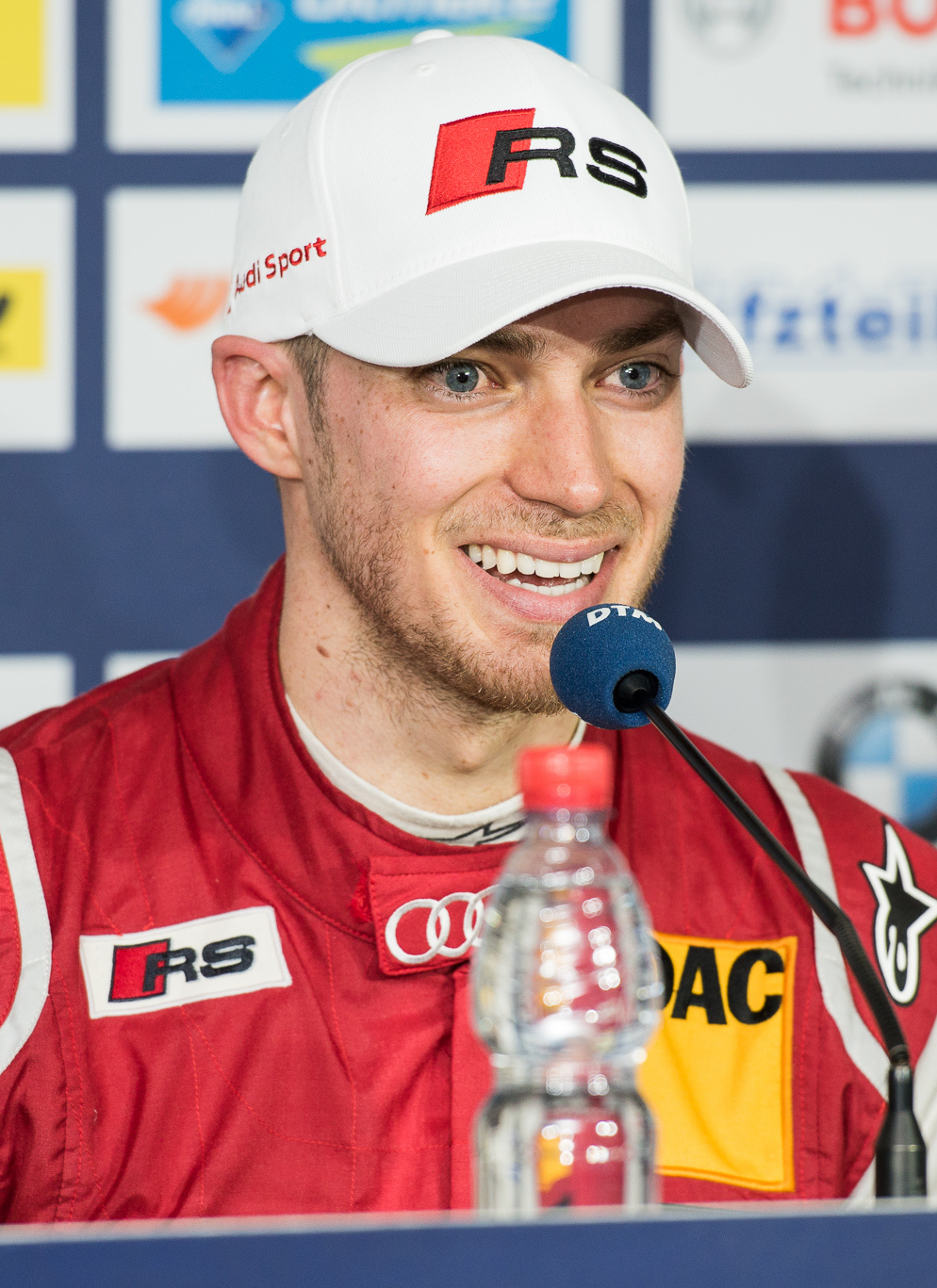
Edoardo Mortara was the first driver to win successive races in the Formula 3 era in 2009 and 2010.

Winners of the Macau Grand Prix by year
Year	Nationality	Winner	Entrant	Chassis and Engine make	Rules	Ref
1954	Macau	Eduardo de Carvalho	—N/a	Triumph TR2	Sports car	
1955	Hong Kong	Robert Ritchie	—N/a	Austin-Healey 100	Sports car	
1956	Hong Kong	Doug Steane	—N/a	Mercedes-Benz 190 SL	Sports car	
1957	United Kingdom	Arthur Pateman	—N/a	Mercedes-Benz 300 SL	Sports car	
1958	Singapore	Chan Lye Choun	C. L. Choun	Aston Martin DB3S	Sports car	
1959	Hong Kong	Ron Hardwick	Ron Hardwick	Jaguar XKSS	Sports car	
1960	Hong Kong	Martin Redfern	Martin Redfern	Jaguar XKSS	Sports car	
1961	United Kingdom	Peter Heath	—N/a	Lotus 15-Climax	Formula Libre	
1962	Philippines	Arsenio Laurel	—N/a	Lotus 22-Ford	Formula Libre	
1963	Philippines	Arsenio Laurel	—N/a	Lotus 22-Ford	Formula Libre	
1964	Hong Kong	Albert Poon	—N/a	Lotus 23-Ford	Formula Libre	
1965	Hong Kong	John MacDonald (Note: Scottish-born MacDonald was a resident of Hong Kong at the time of his victories.)	—N/a	Lotus 18-Ford	Formula Libre	
1966	Belgium	Mauro Bianchi	—N/a	Alpine-Renault T66	Formula Libre	
1967	Malaysia	Tony Maw	—N/a	Lotus 20B-Ford	Formula Libre	
1968	Singapore	Jan Bussell	—N/a	Brabham BT23C-Ford	Formula Libre	
1969	Australia	Kevin Bartlett	Alec Mildren Racing	Mildren Mono-Alfa Romeo	Formula Libre	
1970	Austria	Dieter Quester	BMW	BMW F270	Formula Libre	
1971	Singapore	Jan Bussell	—N/a	McLaren M4C	Formula Libre	
1972	Hong Kong	John MacDonald	—N/a	Brabham BT36	Formula Libre	
1973	Hong Kong	John MacDonald	—N/a	Brabham BT40	Formula Libre	
1974	Australia	Vern Schuppan	Theodore Racing	March 72B-Ford	Formula Pacific	
1975	Hong Kong	John MacDonald	—N/a	Ralt RT1-Ford	Formula Pacific	
1976	Australia	Vern Schuppan	Theodore Racing	Ralt RT1-Ford	Formula Pacific	
1977	Italy	Riccardo Patrese	Bob Harper Racing	Chevron B40-Ford	Formula Pacific	
1978	Italy	Riccardo Patrese	Bob Harper Racing	Chevron B42-Ford	Formula Pacific	
1979	United Kingdom	Geoff Lees	Theodore Racing	Ralt RT1-Ford	Formula Pacific	
1980	United Kingdom	Geoff Lees	Theodore Racing	Ralt RT1-Ford	Formula Pacific	
1981	United States	Bob Earl	Hayashi Racing	Hayashi 220P-Toyota	Formula Pacific	
1982	Brazil	Roberto Moreno	Theodore Racing	Ralt RT4-Ford	Formula Pacific	
1983	Brazil	Ayrton Senna	West Surrey Racing with Theodore Racing	Ralt RT3-Toyota	Formula 3	
1984	Denmark	John Nielsen	Volkswagen Motorsport	Ralt RT3-Volkswagen	Formula 3	
1985	Brazil	Maurício Gugelmin	West Surrey Racing with Theodore Racing	Ralt RT30-Volkswagen	Formula 3	
1986	United Kingdom	Andy Wallace	Madgwick Motorsport	Reynard 863-Volkswagen	Formula 3	
1987	United Kingdom	Martin Donnelly	Intersport Racing	Ralt RT31-Toyota	Formula 3	
1988	Italy	Enrico Bertaggia	Forti Corse	Dallara 388-Alfa Romeo	Formula 3	
1989	Australia	David Brabham	Bowman Racing	Ralt RT33-Volkswagen/Spiess	Formula 3	
1990	Germany	Michael Schumacher	WTS Racing	Reynard 903-Volkswagen/Spiess	Formula 3	
1991	United Kingdom	David Coulthard	Paul Stewart Racing	Ralt RT35-Mugen-Honda	Formula 3	
1992	Sweden	Rickard Rydell	Team TOM'S	TOM'S 032F-Toyota	Formula 3	
1993	Germany	Jörg Müller	RSM Marko	Dallara 393-Fiat	Formula 3	
1994	Germany	Sascha Maassen	WTS Racing	Dallara F394-Opel	Formula 3	
1995	Germany	Ralf Schumacher	WTS Racing	Dallara F394 Opel-Spiess	Formula 3	
1996	Ireland	Ralph Firman	Paul Stewart Racing	Dallara F396 Honda-Mugen/NB	Formula 3	
1997	France	Soheil Ayari	Graff Racing	Dallara F396 Opel-Spiess	Formula 3	
1998	United Kingdom	Peter Dumbreck	Team TOM'S	Dallara F398 Toyota-TOM'S	Formula 3	
1999	United Kingdom	Darren Manning	Team TOM'S	Dallara F399 Toyota-TOM'S	Formula 3	
2000	Macau	André Couto	Bertram Schäfer Racing	Dallara F399 Opel-Spiess	Formula 3	
2001	Japan	Takuma Sato	Carlin Motorsport	Dallara F301 Honda-Mugen	Formula 3	
2002	France	Tristan Gommendy	ASM	Dallara F302 Sodemo-Renault	Formula 3	
2003	France	Nicolas Lapierre	Signature Plus	Dallara F302 Renault-Sodemo	Formula 3	
2004	France	Alexandre Prémat	ASM	Dallara F304 Mercedes-HWA	Formula 3	
2005	Brazil	Lucas di Grassi	Manor Motorsport	Dallara F305 Mercedes-HWA	Formula 3	
2006	United Kingdom	Mike Conway	Räikkönen Robertson Racing	Dallara F306 Mercedes-HWA	Formula 3	
2007	United Kingdom	Oliver Jarvis	Team TOM'S	Dallara F306 Toyota-TOM'S	Formula 3	
2008	Japan	Keisuke Kunimoto	Team TOM'S	Dallara F308 Toyota-TOM'S	Formula 3	
2009	Italy	Edoardo Mortara	Signature Plus	Dallara F308-Volkswagen	Formula 3	
2010	Italy	Edoardo Mortara	Signature Plus	Dallara F308-Volkswagen	Formula 3	
2011	Spain	Daniel Juncadella	Prema Powerteam	Dallara F308 HWA-Mercedes	Formula 3	
2012	Portugal	António Félix da Costa	Carlin Motorsport	Dallara F312-Volkswagen	Formula 3	
2013	United Kingdom	Alex Lynn	Theodore Racing with Prema	Dallara F312-Mercedes	Formula 3	
2014	Sweden	Felix Rosenqvist	Mücke Motorsport	Dallara F312-Mercedes-HWA	Formula 3	
2015	Sweden	Felix Rosenqvist	Prema Powerteam	Dallara F312-Mercedes	Formula 3	
2016	Portugal	António Félix da Costa	Carlin	Dallara F312-Volkswagen	Formula 3	
2017	United Kingdom	Dan Ticktum	Motopark with VEB	Dallara F317-Volkswagen	Formula 3	
2018	United Kingdom	Dan Ticktum	Motopark Academy	Dallara F318-Volkswagen	Formula 3	
2019	Netherlands	Richard Verschoor	MP Motorsport	Dallara F3 2019-Mecachrome	FIA Formula 3 Championship	
2020	Macau	Hon Chio Leong	Smart Life Racing	Mygale M14-F4-SARL	F4 Chinese Championship	
2021	Macau	Hon Chio Leong	Theodore Smart Life Racing	Mygale M14-F4-SARL	F4 Chinese Championship	
2022	Macau	Wing Chung Chang	Champ Motorsport	Mygale M14-F4-SARL	F4 Chinese Championship	
2023	United Kingdom	Luke Browning	Hitech Pulse-Eight	Dallara F3 2019-Mecachrome	FIA Formula 3 Championship	
2024	United States	Ugo Ugochukwu	R-ace GP	Tatuus F3 T-318-Alfa Romeo	Formula Regional	
2025	France	Théophile Naël	KCMG Enya Pinnacle Motorsport	Tatuus F3 T-318-Alfa Romeo	Formula Regional	
2026	United Kingdom	Kean Nakamura-Berta	SJM Theodore Racing	Tatuus F3 T-318-Alfa Romeo	Formula Regional	

== Records ==
=== By driver ===
Multiple wins by driver
Name	Wins	Years
John MacDonald	4	1965, 1972, 1973, 1975
Jan Bussell	2	1968, 1971
António Félix da Costa	2	2012, 2016
Arsenio Laurel	2	1962, 1963
Geoff Lees	2	1979, 1980
Hon Chio Leong	2	2020, 2021
Edoardo Mortara	2	2009, 2010
Riccardo Patrese	2	1977, 1978
Felix Rosenqvist	2	2014, 2015
Vern Schuppan	2	1974, 1976
Dan Ticktum	2	2017, 2018

=== By nationality ===
Victories by nationality
Nationality	Wins	Drivers
United Kingdom	16	14
Hong Kong	9	6
France	5	5
Macau	5	4
Italy	5	3
Brazil	4	4
Germany	4	4
Australia	4	3
Singapore	3	2
Sweden	3	2
Japan	2	2
United States	2	2
Philippines	2	1
Portugal	2	1
Austria	1	1
Belgium	1	1
Denmark	1	1
Ireland	1	1
Malaysia	1	1
Netherlands	1	1
Spain	1	1

=== By entrant ===
Wins by entrant
Entrant	Wins	Drivers
Theodore Racing	9	8
Team TOM'S	5	5
Prema Powerteam	3	3
WTS Racing	3	3
Carlin	3	2
Signature Plus	3	2
ASM	2	2
Bob Harper Racing	2	2
Paul Stewart Racing	2	2
West Surrey Racing	2	2
Motopark Academy	2	1
Smart Life Racing	2	1
Bertram Schäfer Racing	1	1
Bowman Racing	1	1
BMW	1	1
C. L. Choon	1	1
Champ Motorsport	1	1
Forti Corse	1	1
Graff Racing	1	1
KCMG	1	1
Hayashi Racing	1	1
Hitech Pulse-Eight	1	1
Intersport Racing	1	1
Madgwick Motorsport	1	1
Manor Motorsport	1	1
Martin Redfern	1	1
MP Motorsport	1	1
Mücke Motorsport	1	1
R-ace GP	1	1
Räikkönen Robertson Racing	1	1
Ron Hardwick	1	1
RSM Marko	1	1
Volkswagen Motorsport	1	1

== Bibliography ==
- Davies, Shann (1991). "Sport: Macau Grand Prix". Macau. Lincolnwood, Illinois: Passport Books. ISBN 978-0-8442-9797-2 – via Open Library.
- Girard, Greg; Lambot, Ian; Newsome, Philip (1998). Macau Grand Prix: The Road to Success. Haslemere, Surrey: Watermark Publications. ISBN 1-873-200-21-8 – via Open Library.
