= Jaya Ancol Circuit =

First automotive circuit in Indonesia

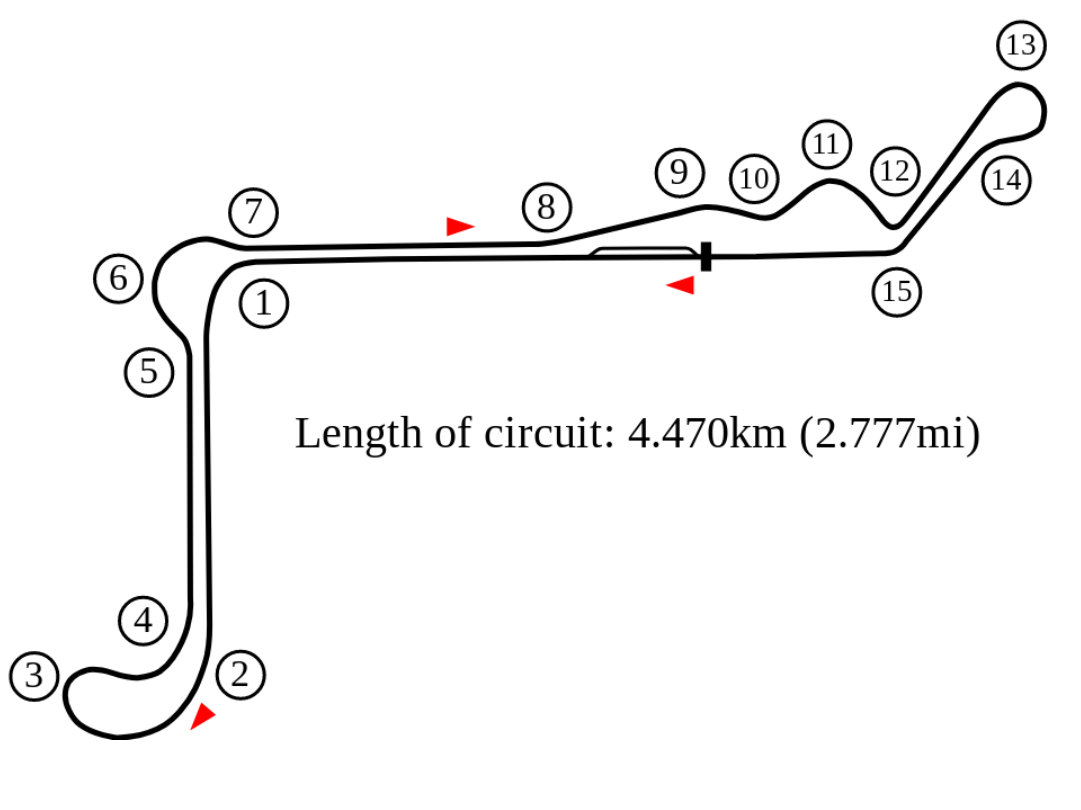
- Grand Prix Circuit (1971–1992)
- Location: Pademangan, Ancol, North Jakarta, Indonesia
- Coordinates: 6°7′18.4″S 106°50′41.5″E
- Broke ground: 1967
- Opened: October 1969; 57 years ago
- Closed: 1992
- Major events: Indonesian Grand Prix (1976)

Grand Prix Circuit (1971–1992)
- Surface: Asphalt
- Length: 4.470 km (2.778 mi)
- Turns: 15
- Race lap record: 1:44.600 ( (Hong Kong) John MacDonald, Ralt RT1, 1976, Formula Atlantic)

Full Circuit (1970)
- Length: 3.950 km (2.454 mi)
- Turns: 12

Original Circuit (1969)
- Length: 3.590 km (2.231 mi)

The Jaya Ancol Circuit was the first automotive circuit in Indonesia. Constructed in 1969 and closed in 1992, it was situated in the Ancol area of North Jakarta.

== History ==
=== Construction ===
The circuit had secured several sponsorships during the construction period, which had direct contribution by the companies Astra and PT Indocement, who had given Rp 30 million for its creation. Tinton Soeprapto, a racer and the father of national racers Ananda Mikola and Moreno Soeprapto, was appointed as the mascot of the circuit by Ali Sadikin, then governor of Jakarta, as a way to attract more international racers to the circuit. The circuit underwent several renovations during its lifetime.

In October 1969, the Jaya Ancol Race I event took place on what was then a residential road with uneven bends. The circuit width ranged from 7 to 10.5 m (23 to 34 ft) wide and had a length of 3.590 km (2.231 mi). In October 1970, the Jaya Ancol Race II was held, with the circuit length extended to 3.950 km (2.454 mi) meters and the number of corners increased to 12.

=== Closure ===
The Jaya Ancol Circuit was originally managed by BPP Ancol, once held by Herman Sarens Soediro and Tinton Soeprapto assumed management in 1983. Governor Soeprapto sent an order to the Chairman of the Indonesian Motor Association (IMI), then held by Hutomo Mandala Putra.

The Ancol circuit, originally 40 ha (99 acres), gradually decreased in size to 12 ha (30 acres). Due to noise and pollution complaints from residents of adjacent elite housing and damage to facilities, the Jaya Ancol Circuit closed in 1992. It was replaced by the Sentul Circuit in Bogor, 40 km (25 mi) south of Jakarta.

The remains of the circuit are now used as an access road for Jaya Ancol theme park and the southern loop is occupied by a highway interchange. The new Jakarta International e-Prix Circuit is adjacent to the former site of the north loop.

== Results ==
Winners of the Ancol Formula Atlantic Indonesian Grand Prix:

Year	Driver	Car	Location	Formula	Report
1976	(Hong Kong) John MacDonald	Ralt RT1	Jaya Ancol Circuit	Formula Atlantic	Report
