= 1976 Indonesian Grand Prix =

- Formula Atlantic Race
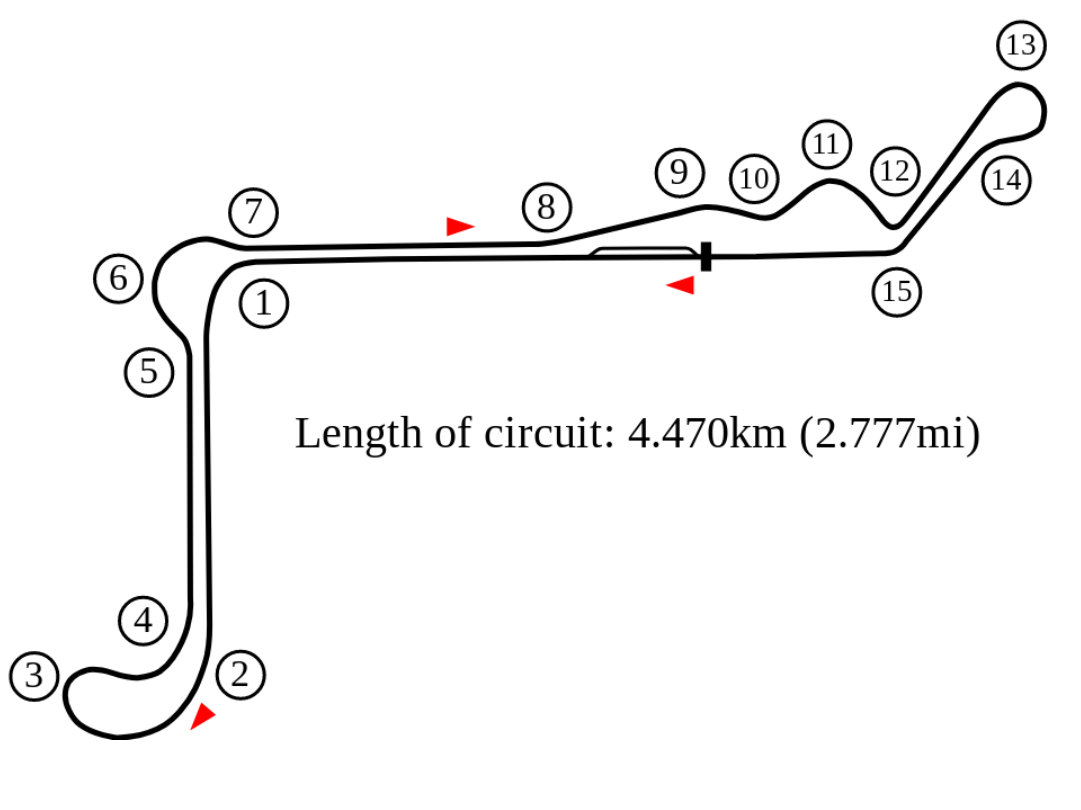

Race details
- Date: October 24, 1976
- Location: Ancol, Pademangan, North Jakarta
- Course: Jaya Ancol Circuit
- Course length: 4.470 km (2.777 miles)

Fastest lap
- Driver: (Hong Kong) John MacDonald
- Time: 1:44.600

Podium
- First: (Hong Kong) John MacDonald
- Second: (Hong Kong) Albert Poon
- Third: (United States) Grant Swartz

The 1976 Indonesian Grand Prix was a motor race held at the Jaya Ancol Circuit, Jakarta, Indonesia on 24 October 1976. It was the inaugural Indonesian Grand Prix. The race was Round 3 of the 1976 Rothmans International Far East Series, which was open to Formula Atlantic cars.

There were 14 entries in total, but only 12 drivers started the race. The race was won by John MacDonald, driving a Ralt RT1. He also set the fastest lap of the race, in a time of 1:44.6.

== Race results ==
Pos.	Driver	Car
1	John MacDonald	Ralt RT1
2	Albert Poon	Chevron B35
3	Grant Swartz	
?	Sonny Rajah	March
DNF	Graeme Lawrence	March 76B
