= Robert Ritchie =

Robert Ritchie may refer to:

- Robert Ritchie (racing driver) (fl. 1955), Hong Kong racecar driver
- Bob Ritchie (ice hockey) (born 1955), Canadian former ice hockey left winger
- Robert J. Ritchie (politician) (fl. 1878–1890), lawyer and politician in New Brunswick, Canada
- Robert J. Ritchie (railroad executive) (1990–2012), former president and CEO of the Canadian Pacific Railway
- Robert Ritchie (Australian politician) (1836–1891), New South Wales politician
- Robert O. Ritchie (fl. 2013–2017), professor of engineering
- Robert T. Ritchie, priest and rector of St. Patrick's Cathedral, New York City
- Robert Yarnall Richie (1908–1984), American photographer
- Robert Ritchie (footballer) (1884–1954), Australian rules footballer
- Robert Peel Ritchie (1835–1902), Scottish physician and medical historian
- Robert Ritchie (The West Wing), a fictional character on the American TV drama The West Wing
- Robert Ritchie, American rapper, known as Kid Rock
- Robert Ritchie, mayor of Strathcona and name sake of Ritchie, Edmonton
- Robert Ritchie (priest), American Anglo-Catholic clergyman and author

== See also ==
- Rob Richie (born 1962), American electoral reform advocate
- Robert Richie (Venice), 18th century diplomat, see List of diplomats from the United Kingdom to the Republic of Venice
