= Indonesian Grand Prix =

Motor race event, 1976–1995

Race information
- Number of times held: 3
- First held: 1976
- Last held: 1995
- Most wins (drivers): no repeat winners
- Most wins (constructors): no repeat winners

Last race (1995)

Pole position
- Paul Stokell; Reynard-Holden; 1:22.693

Podium
- 1. P. Stokell; Reynard-Holden; 28:05.552; 2. R. Haryanto; Reynard-Holden; 28:35.000; 3. C. Lowndes; Reynard-Holden; 28:37.339

Fastest lap
- P. Stokell; Reynard-Holden; 1:22.693

The Indonesian Grand Prix was an open-wheel racing car motor race, held intermittently as motorsport ambitions varied in Indonesia.

== History ==
Held originally at the Jaya Ancol Circuit near Jakarta in 1976 as part of the burgeoning Rothmans International Grand Prix Trophy series for Formula Pacific open wheelers, the race was discontinued after the inaugural event. While motorcycle racing continued to enjoy support in Indonesia, car racing fluctuated. The early 1980s saw a burst of enthusiasm import some Australian teams briefly in a demonstration. A demonstration "Grand Prix" was held in 1981 for Australian F2 cars with Sonny Rajah winning the event, which comprised a grid of 7 Australians, Rajah, and Tinton Soeprapto.

Some national events were held at Jaya Ancol using the Formula Kijang car fitted with a Toyota Kijang engine, but not officially under the Indonesian Grand Prix banner

A second Grand Prix was held in 1993 for the Australian Formula Brabham category. It was planned as a demonstration for attracting the Formula 1 world championship and a mixed grid of locals (including one Tommy Suharto) and Australian drivers raced at Sentul International Circuit. The experienced Australians dominated with Mark Larkham claiming victory in a Reynard 91D. Sentul was too small for Formula One and the money to build a circuit never appeared.

A final Grand Prix was held in 1995, again for the Australian Formula Brabham category. Paul Stokell returned having finished second in the 1993 edition and would take pole position ahead of a pair of Indonesian drivers, Roy Haryanto and Stanley Iriawan. Stokell would win the Grand Prix having beaten Haryanto in the first race, who finished ahead of Craig Lowndes, before finishing ahead of Lowndes in the second race after Haryanto's gearbox failed.

== Winners of the Indonesian Grand Prix ==
Year	Driver	Car	Location	Formula	Report
1976	(Hong Kong) John MacDonald	Ralt RT1	Jaya Ancol Circuit	Formula Atlantic	Report
1977 to 1992	Not held				
1993	(Australia) Mark Larkham	Reynard 91D-Holden	Sentul International Circuit	Formula Brabham	Report
1995	(Australia) Paul Stokell	Reynard 91D-Holden	Sentul International Circuit	Formula Brabham	Report
