= 1982 Macau Grand Prix =

29th running of the Macau Grand Prix

Race details
| Date | 21 November 1982 |
| Location | Guia Circuit, Macau |
| Course | Temporary street circuit 6.12 km (3.80 mi) |
| Distance | 32 laps, 195.84 km (121.69 mi) |

Overall Results
- First: (Brazil) Roberto Moreno (1h 18m 33.32s) Cargo Holdings
- Second: (Republic of Ireland) Alo Lawler (1h 18m 59.38s) The Lep Group
- Third: (Japan) Takao Wada (1h 19m 32.74s) Takao Wada

The 1982 Macau Grand Prix was the 29th Macau Grand Prix race to be held on the streets of Macau on 21 November 1982. It was the ninth and final edition of the race to be held for Formula Pacific cars.

The race was won by Roberto Moreno in the #16 Cargo Holdings Ralt RT4/82-Ford BDD with a total time of 1:18:33.320. Roberto Guerrero broke the lap record with a time of 2:20.64. The previous record was held by Alan Jones who put down a time of 2:21.44 in 1976.

== Entry list ==
All teams use Formula Pacific 1.6 liter engines.

| Team | No | Driver | Vehicle | Engine |
|---|---|---|---|---|
| Marlboro-Theodore Racing | 1 | (United Kingdom) Geoff Lees | Ralt RT4/81 | Ford BDA |
| Marlboro-Theodore Racing | 2 | (Colombia) Roberto Guerrero | Ralt RT4/82 | Ford BDD |
| The Lep Group | 4 | (Republic of Ireland) Alo Lawler | Ralt RT4/80 | Ford BDA |
| Kazuyoshi Hoshino | 5 | (Japan) Kazuyoshi Hoshino | Ralt RT4/82 | Nissan LZ14 |
| Duncan Bain | 6 | (United Kingdom) Duncan Bain | March 78B | Ford BDD |
| Takao Wada | 7 | (Japan) Takao Wada | Falcon 82P | Nissan LZ14-Tomei |
| Crown Motors | 8 | (United Kingdom) Tiff Needell | Ralt RT4 | Toyota 2T-G-Tom's |
| | 9 | (United Kingdom) Gary Gibson | Chevron B56 | Ford BDA |
| Team Tiga | 10 | (Australia) Neil Crang | Tiga FA82 | Ford BDD |
| Team Tiga | 15 | (United Kingdom) John Sheldon | Tiga FA81/82 | Ford BDD |
| Flying Tigers Racing | 11 | (Japan) Masahiro Hasemi | Ralt RT4/82 | Nissan LZ14 |
| Flying Tigers Racing | 12 | (Japan) Shuroku Sasaki | March 81A | Nissan LZ14-Tomei |
| Cargo Holdings | 16 | (Brazil) Roberto Moreno | Ralt RT4/82 | Ford BDD |
| Mike Catlow | 17 | (United Kingdom) Mike Catlow | Ralt RT1/77 | Ford BDD |
| MDB Systems | 19 | (United States) Mark Moore | Ralt RT4 | Ford BDD |
| Equippe 66 Racing | 66 | (British Hong Kong) Albert Poon | Chevron B39/B40 | Ford BDA |
| Equippe 66 Racing | 99 | (Australia) Vern Schuppan | Tiga FA81 | Ford BDD |
| Agapiou Racing | | (British Hong Kong) Ka Ming Ho | Ralt RT4 | Ford BDD |

== Results ==
=== Qualifying ===
| Pos | No. | Driver | Team | Time | Gap | Grid |
|---|---|---|---|---|---|---|
| 1 | 11 | (Japan) Masahiro Hasemi | Flying Tigers Racing | 2:20.48 | — | 1 |
| 2 | 5 | (Japan) Kazuyoshi Hoshino | Kazuyoshi Hoshino | 2:21.76 | +1.28s | 2 |
| 3 | 16 | (Brazil) Roberto Moreno | Cargo Holdings | 2:21.96 | +1.48s | 3 |
| 4 | 8 | (United Kingdom) Tiff Needell | Crown Motors | 2:22.13 | +1.65s | 4 |
| 5 | 1 | (United Kingdom) Geoff Lees | Marlboro-Theodore Racing | 2:22.96 | +2.48s | 5 |
| 6 | 2 | (Colombia) Roberto Guerrero | Marlboro-Theodore Racing | 2:23.79 | +3.31s | 6 |
| 7 | 7 | (Japan) Takao Wada | Takao Wada | 2:24.17 | +3.69s | 7 |
| 8 | 19 | (United States) Mark Moore | MDB Systems | 2:25.88 | +5.40s | 8 |
| 9 | 4 | (Republic of Ireland) Alo Lawler | The Lep Group | 2:25.88 | +5.40s | 9 |
| 10 | 12 | (Japan) Shuroku Sasaki | Flying Tigers Racing | 2:26.96 | +6.48s | 10 |
| 11 | 9 | (United Kingdom) Gary Gibson | | 2:27.82 | +7.34s | 11 |
| 12 | 10 | (Australia) Neil Crang | Team Tiga | 2:29.35 | +8.87s | 12 |
| 13 | 66 | (Hong Kong) Albert Poon | Equippe 66 Racing | 2:29.79 | +9.31s | 13 |
| 14 | 15 | (United Kingdom) John Sheldon | Team Tiga | 2:30.98 | +10.50s | 14 |
| 15 | 17 | (United Kingdom) Mike Catlow | Mike Catlow | 2:32.07 | +11.59s | 15 |
| 16 | 99 | (Australia) Vern Schuppan | Equippe 66 Racing | 2:32.09 | +11.61s | 16 |
| 17 | 6 | (United Kingdom) Duncan Bain | Duncan Bain | 2:38.81 | +18.33s | 17 |
| 18 | | (Hong Kong) Ka Ming Ho | Agapiou Racing | 2:44.30 | +23.82s | 18 |

=== Race ===
| Pos. | No. | Driver | Team | Laps | Time/Retired |
|---|---|---|---|---|---|
| 1 | 16 | (Brazil) Roberto Moreno | Cargo Holdings | 32 | 1hr 18min 33.32sec |
| 2 | 4 | (Republic of Ireland) Alo Lawler | The Lep Group | 32 | +26.06s |
| 3 | 7 | (Japan) Takao Wada | Takao Wada | 32 | +59.42s |
| 4 | 10 | (Australia) Neil Crang | Team Tiga | 32 | +2:29.03s |
| 5 | 66 | (Hong Kong) Albert Poon | Equippe 66 Racing | 31 | +1 Lap |
| 6 | 15 | (United Kingdom) John Sheldon | Team Tiga | 31 | +1 Lap |
| 7 | 9 | (United Kingdom) Gary Gibson | | 31 | +1 Lap |
| 8 | 2 | (Colombia) Roberto Guerrero | Marlboro-Theodore Racing | 31 | Accident |
| DNF | 99 | (Australia) Vern Schuppan | Equippe 66 Racing | 30 | Fuel |
| DNF | 8 | (United Kingdom) Tiff Needell | Crown Motors | 27 | Accident |
| DNF | 19 | (United States) Mark Moore | MDB Systems | 27 | Engine |
| DNF | 17 | (United Kingdom) Mike Catlow | Mike Catlow | 26 | Engine |
| DNF | 11 | (Japan) Masahiro Hasemi | Flying Tigers Racing | 26 | Contact damage |
| DNF | 5 | (Japan) Kazuyoshi Hoshino | Kazuyoshi Hoshino | 20 | Engine |
| DNF | 1 | (United Kingdom) Geoff Lees | Marlboro-Theodore Racing | 17 | Fuel pump |
| DNF | 6 | (United Kingdom) Duncan Bain | Duncan Bain | 15 | Did not finish |
| DNF | | (Hong Kong) Ka Ming Ho | Agapiou Racing | 11 | Engine |
| DNF | 12 | (Japan) Shuroku Sasaki | Flying Tigers Racing | 0 | Gearbox |
Fastest lap: (Colombia) Roberto Guerrero, 2:20.64
