= 1983 Macau Grand Prix =

Formula Three motor race

Race details
Date	20 November 1983
Location	Guia Circuit, Macau
Course	Temporary street circuit 6.120 km (3.803 mi)
Distance	Leg 1; 15 laps, 91.800 km (57.042 mi); Leg 2; 15 laps, 91.800 km (57.042 mi)
- Leg 1

Pole
Driver	(Brazil) Ayrton Senna; West Surrey Racing
Time	2:22.02

Fastest Lap
Driver	(Brazil) Ayrton Senna; West Surrey Racing
Time	2:21.59

Podium
First	(Brazil) Ayrton Senna; West Surrey Racing
Second	(Colombia) Roberto Guerrero; Eddie Jordan Racing
Third	(Austria) Gerhard Berger; Trivellato Racing
- Leg 2

Pole
Driver	(Brazil) Ayrton Senna; West Surrey Racing

Fastest Lap
Driver	(Austria) Gerhard Berger; Trivellato Racing
Time	2:21.16 (on lap 15)

Podium
First	(Brazil) Ayrton Senna; West Surrey Racing
Second	(Colombia) Roberto Guerrero; Eddie Jordan Racing
Third	(Austria) Gerhard Berger; Trivellato Racing

Overall Results
- First: (Brazil) Ayrton Senna (1h 11m 34.96s) West Surrey Racing
- Second: (Colombia) Roberto Guerrero (1h 11m 42.28s) Eddie Jordan Racing
- Third: (Austria) Gerhard Berger (1h 12m 12.64s) Trivellato Racing

The 1983 Macau Grand Prix Formula Three was the 30th Macau Grand Prix race to be held on the streets of Macau on 20 November 1983. It was the first edition for Formula Three cars.

== Entry list ==
Team	No	Driver	Vehicle	Engine
(British Hong Kong) Marlboro Theodore Racing w/ Eddie Jordan Racing (Republic of Ireland) Eddie Jordan Racing	1	(Colombia) Roberto Guerrero	Ralt RT3	Toyota
(British Hong Kong) Marlboro Theodore Racing w/ Eddie Jordan Racing (Republic of Ireland) Eddie Jordan Racing	2	(United Kingdom) Martin Brundle	Ralt RT3	Toyota
(British Hong Kong) Marlboro Theodore Racing w/ Eddie Jordan Racing (Republic of Ireland) Eddie Jordan Racing	77	(Canada) Allen Berg	Ralt RT3	Toyota
(British Hong Kong) Marlboro Theodore Racing w/ West Surrey Racing	3	(Brazil) Ayrton Senna	Ralt RT3	Toyota
(United Kingdom) Murray Taylor Racing	5	(United States) Davy Jones	Ralt RT3	Volkswagen
(United Kingdom) Murray Taylor Racing	11	(Switzerland) Mario Hytten	Ralt RT3	Toyota
(Japan) Autobacs Racing Team	7	(Sweden) Eje Elgh	Hayashi 322	Toyota
(Japan) Autobacs Racing Team	8	(United Kingdom) Tiff Needell	Ralt RT3	Toyota
(United Kingdom) David Price Racing	9	(United Kingdom) David Hunt	Ralt RT3	Volkswagen
(United Kingdom) David Price Racing	10	(France) Jean-Louis Schlesser	Ralt RT3	Volkswagen
(United Kingdom) Anson Racing	14	(Republic of Ireland) Tommy Byrne	Anson SA4	Alfa Romeo
(United Kingdom) Anson Racing	12	(Italy) Claudio Langes	Anson SA4	Alfa Romeo
(United Kingdom) Anson Racing	76	(Netherlands) Cor Euser	Anson SA4	Toyota
(United Kingdom) Anson Racing	75	(Sweden) Stanley Dickens	Anson SA4	Toyota
(Germany) Volkswagen Motorsport	15	(Austria) Franz Konrad	Anson SA4	Volkswagen
(France) Elf by Volkswagen	16	(France) Cathy Muller	Ralt RT3	Volkswagen
(Italy) Luciano Pavesi	17	(Italy) Pierluigi Martini	Ralt RT3	Alfa Romeo
(Denmark) MC Motorsport	18	(Denmark) Kris Nissen	Ralt RT3	Toyota
(Switzerland) Jo Zeller Racing	19	(Switzerland) Jo Zeller	Ralt RT3	Toyota
(Italy) Trivellato Racing	21	(Austria) Gerhard Berger	Ralt RT3	Alfa Romeo
(Sweden) Leo Andersson Racing	22	(Sweden) Leo Andersson	Ralt RT3	Toyota
(United Kingdom) Lep Racing	55	(United Kingdom) Gary Gibson	Ralt RT3	Toyota
(Australia) Equipe 66	66	(Australia) Vern Schuppan	Ralt RT3	Toyota
(United States) Flying Tigers Racing	72	(United States) Bob Earl	Ralt RT3	Toyota
(United States) Flying Tigers Racing	74	(United States) Price Cobb	Ralt RT3	Toyota

== Race results ==
=== Qualifying ===
Pos	No.	Driver	Team	Time	Gap	Grid
1	3	(Brazil) Ayrton Senna	West Surrey Racing	2:22.02		1
2	1	(Colombia) Roberto Guerrero	Eddie Jordan Racing	2:22.18	+ 0.16 s	2
3	2	(United Kingdom) Martin Brundle	Eddie Jordan Racing	2:22.26	+ 0.24 s	3
4	17	(Italy) Pierluigi Martini	Luciano Pavesi	2:23.03	+ 1.01 s	4
5	21	(Austria) Gerhard Berger	Trivellato Racing	2:23.85	+ 1.83 s	5
6	7	(Sweden) Eje Elgh	Autobacs Racing Team	2:23.97	+ 1.95 s	6
7	5	(United States) Davy Jones	Murray Taylor Racing	2:24.24	+ 2.22 s	7
8	10	(France) Jean-Louis Schlesser	David Price Racing	2:24.42	+ 2.40 s	8
9	14	(Republic of Ireland) Tommy Byrne	Anson Racing	2:24.48	+ 2.46 s	9
10	77	(Canada) Allen Berg	Eddie Jordan Racing	2:24.52	+ 2.50 s	10
11	12	(Italy) Claudio Langes	Anson Racing	2:25.01	+ 2.99 s	11
12	72	(United States) Bob Earl	Flying Tigers Racing	2:25.32	+ 3.20 s	12
13	15	(Austria) Franz Konrad	Volkswagen Motorsport	2:25.92	+ 3.80 s	13
14	55	(United Kingdom) Gary Gibson	Lep Racing	2:26.04	+ 4.02 s	14
15	74	(United States) Price Cobb	Flying Tigers Racing	2:26.06	+ 4.04 s	15
16	11	(Switzerland) Mario Hytten	Murray Taylor Racing	2:26.24	+ 4.22 s	16
17	8	(United Kingdom) Tiff Needell	Autobacs Racing Team	2:26.25	+ 4.32 s	17
18	9	(United Kingdom) David Hunt	David Price Racing	2:26.53	+ 4.51 s	18
19	18	(Denmark) Kris Nissen	MC Motorsport	2:26.63	+ 4.61 s	19
20	16	(France) Cathy Muller	Elf by Volkswagen	2:26.78	+ 4.76 s	20
21	66	(Australia) Vern Schuppan	Equipe 66	2:27.63	+ 5.61 s	21
22	19	(Switzerland) Jo Zeller	Jo Zeller Racing	2:27.76	+ 5.74 s	22
23	75	(Sweden) Stanley Dickens	Anson Racing	2:27.85	+ 5.83 s	23
24	76	(Netherlands) Cor Euser	Anson Racing	2:29.94	+ 7.92 s	24
25	22	(Sweden) Leo Andersson	Leo Andersson Racing	2:32.35	+ 10.33 s	25

=== Leg 1 ===
Pos	No	Driver	Team	Laps	Time/Retired	Grid
1	3	(Brazil) Ayrton Senna	West Surrey Racing	15	35min 44.65sec	1
2	1	(Colombia) Roberto Guerrero	Eddie Jordan Racing	15	+ 6.00 s	2
3	21	(Austria) Gerhard Berger	Trivellato Racing	15	+ 20.83 s	5
4	5	(United States) Davy Jones	Murray Taylor Racing	15	+ 24.00 s	7
5	14	(Republic of Ireland) Tommy Byrne	Anson Racing	15	+ 30.58 s	9
6	7	(Sweden) Eje Elgh	Autobacs Racing Team	15	+ 39.53 s	6
7	77	(Canada) Allen Berg	Eddie Jordan Racing	15	+ 1:06.10 s	10
8	11	(Switzerland) Mario Hytten	Murray Taylor Racing	15	+ 1:06.70 s	16
9	72	(United States) Bob Earl	Flying Tigers Racing	15	+ 1:07.13 s	12
10	10	(France) Jean-Louis Schlesser	David Price Racing	15	+ 1:07.13 s	8
11	18	(Denmark) Kris Nissen	MC Motorsport	15	+ 1:16.30 s	19
12	16	(France) Cathy Muller	Elf by Volkswagen	15	+ 1:30.78 s	20
13	9	(United Kingdom) David Hunt	David Price Racing	15	+ 1:35.38 s	18
14	19	(Switzerland) Jo Zeller	Jo Zeller Racing	15	+ 1:36.03 s	22
15	8	(United Kingdom) Tiff Needell	Autobacs Racing Team	15	+ 1:36.26 s	17
16	74	(United States) Price Cobb	Flying Tigers Racing	15	+ 1:49.79 s	15
17	66	(Australia) Vern Schuppan	Equipe 66	15	+ 1:54.07 s	21
18	2	(United Kingdom) Martin Brundle	Eddie Jordan Racing	15	+ 2:00.81 s	3
19	75	(Sweden) Stanley Dickens	Anson Racing	15	+ 2:06.22 s	23
20	15	(Austria) Franz Konrad	Volkswagen Motorsport	15	+ 2:11.46 s	13
Ret	17	(Italy) Pierluigi Martini	Luciano Pavesi	2	Retired	4
Ret	55	(United Kingdom) Gary Gibson	Lep Racing	1	Retired	14
DNS	12	(Italy) Claudio Langes	Anson Racing		Did Not Start	
DNS	76	(Netherlands) Cor Euser	Anson Racing		Did Not Start	
DNS	22	(Sweden) Leo Andersson	Leo Andersson Racing		Did Not Start	
Fastest lap: (Brazil) Ayrton Senna, 2:21.59, 155.477 km/h (96.609 mph)

=== Leg 2 ===
Pos	No.	Driver	Team	Laps	Time/Retired	Grid
1	3	(Brazil) Ayrton Senna	West Surrey Racing	15	35min 50.31sec	1
2	1	(Colombia) Roberto Guerrero	Eddie Jordan Racing	15	+ 1.22 s	2
3	21	(Austria) Gerhard Berger	Trivellato Racing	15	+ 16.85 s	3
4	2	(United Kingdom) Martin Brundle	Eddie Jordan Racing	15	+ 18.89 s	18
5	7	(Sweden) Eje Elgh	Autobacs Racing Team	15	+ 34.85 s	6
6	77	(Canada) Allen Berg	Eddie Jordan Racing	15	+ 35.11 s	7
7	10	(France) Jean-Louis Schlesser	David Price Racing	15	+ 38.01 s	10
8	18	(Denmark) Kris Nissen	MC Motorsport	15	+ 50.86 s	11
9	11	(Switzerland) Mario Hytten	Murray Taylor Racing	15	+ 52.15 s	8
10	72	(United States) Bob Earl	Flying Tigers Racing	15	+ 52.62 s	9
11	74	(United States) Price Cobb	Flying Tigers Racing	15	+ 1:18.39 s	16
12	16	(France) Cathy Muller	Elf by Volkswagen	15	+ 1:20.45 s	12
13	8	(United Kingdom) Tiff Needell	Autobacs Racing Team	15	+ 1:27.37 s	15
14	19	(Switzerland) Jo Zeller	Jo Zeller Racing	15	+ 1:27.40 s	14
15	75	(Sweden) Stanley Dickens	Anson Racing	15	+ 1:49.24 s	19
Ret	66	(Australia) Vern Schuppan	Equipe 66	12	Retired	17
Ret	5	(United States) Davy Jones	Murray Taylor Racing	11	Retired	4
Ret	9	(United Kingdom) David Hunt	David Price Racing	8	Retired	13
Ret	14	(Republic of Ireland) Tommy Byrne	Anson Racing	7	Retired	5
Ret	15	(Austria) Franz Konrad	Volkswagen Motorsport	3	Retired	20
DNS	17	(Italy) Pierluigi Martini	Luciano Pavesi		Did Not Start	
DNS	55	(United Kingdom) Gary Gibson	Lep Racing		Did Not Start	
DNS	12	(Italy) Claudio Langes	Anson Racing		Did Not Start	
DNS	76	(Netherlands) Cor Euser	Anson Racing		Did Not Start	
DNS	22	(Sweden) Leo Andersson	Leo Andersson Racing		Did Not Start	
Fastest lap: (Austria) Gerhard Berger, 2:21.16, 155.951 km/h (96.903 mph)

=== Overall Race Result ===
Pos.	No.	Driver	Team	Laps	Time/Retired
1	3	(Brazil) Ayrton Senna	West Surrey Racing	30	1hr 11min 34.960sec
2	1	(Colombia) Roberto Guerrero	Eddie Jordan Racing	30	+7.320s
3	21	(Austria) Gerhard Berger	Trivellato Racing	30	+37.680s
4	7	(Sweden) Eje Elgh	Autobacs Racing Team	30	+1:14.380s
5	77	(Canada) Allen Berg	Eddie Jordan Racing	30	+1:41.210s
6	10	(France) Jean-Louis Schlesser	David Price Racing	30	+1:45.140s
7	11	(Switzerland) Mario Hytten	Murray Taylor Racing	30	+1:58.850s
8	72	(United States) Bob Earl	Flying Tigers Racing	30	+1:59.750s
9	18	(Denmark) Kris Nissen	MC Motorsport	30	+2:07.160s
10	2	(United Kingdom) Martin Brundle	Eddie Jordan Racing	30	+2:09.700s
11	16	(France) Cathy Muller	Elf by Volkswagen	30	+2:51.230s
12	74	(United States) Price Cobb	Flying Tigers Racing	30	+2:58.180s
13	19	(Switzerland) Jo Zeller	Jo Zeller Racing	30	+3:03.430s
14	8	(United Kingdom) Tiff Needell	Autobacs Racing Team	30	+3:03.630s
15	75	(Sweden) Stanley Dickens	Anson Racing	30	+3:35.460s
DNF	66	(Australia) Vern Schuppan	Equipe 66	27	Retired
DNF	5	(United States) Davy Jones	Murray Taylor Racing	26	Retired
DNF	9	(United Kingdom) David Hunt	David Price Racing	23	Retired
DNF	14	(Republic of Ireland) Tommy Byrne	Anson Racing	22	Retired
DNF	15	(Austria) Franz Konrad	Volkswagen Motorsport	18	Retired
DNF	17	(Italy) Pierluigi Martini	Luciano Pavesi	2	Retired
DNF	55	(United Kingdom) Gary Gibson	Lep Racing	0	Retired
DNS	12	(Italy) Claudio Langes	Anson Racing	-	Did Not Start
DNS	76	(Netherlands) Cor Euser	Anson Racing	-	Did Not Start
DNS	22	(Sweden) Leo Andersson	Leo Andersson Racing	-	Did Not Start
