= Macau Guia Race =

International touring car race in Macau

- Guia Circuit

Race information
- Most wins (drivers): (United Kingdom) Robert Huff (10)
- Most wins (constructors): (Germany) BMW (21)

Last race (2023)
- Race 1 Winner: (Hungary) Norbert Michelisz; Hyundai Elantra N TCR
- Race 2 Winner: (Belgium) Frédéric Vervisch; Audi RS 3 LMS TCR

The Macau Guia Race - Kumho TCR World Tour Event of Macau, previously Guia Race of Macau, WTCC Guia Race of Macau, WTCR Macau Guia Race and Macau Guia Race - TCR Asia Challenge, is an international touring car race, and currently a round of the TCR World Tour. It is held on the temporary 6.2 km Guia Circuit on the streets of Macau, the Special Administrative Region of the People's Republic of China as part of the Macau Grand Prix weekend. Before 2005 when the World Touring Car Championship began, the Guia race had been run annually as a one-off international touring car race.

== History ==
Since its first running in 1972, the race has been won by international touring car greats such as Tom Walkinshaw, Johnny Cecotto, Roberto Ravaglia, Emanuele Pirro, Joachim Winkelhock and Andy Priaulx.

Historically it is also one of the most popular races of the weekend as it featured cars that are commonly seen on the Hong Kong and Macau roads.

== TCR ==
Since 2018, it has been run under the TCR championship banner, first as World Touring Car, then China Touring Car from 2020 to 2022.

In 2023, it was part of the TCR World Tour, as the final round, with the top 8 TCR Asia Challenge drivers calculated by points be part of the race.

== Previous championship status ==
Prior to being a World Touring Car Championship round, the Guia Race had previously been an FIA Championship round. In 1994, it was a round of the Asia-Pacific Touring Car Championship. The race also acted as a point scoring round for the Asian Touring Car Championship from 2000 to 2003. From 2005 to 2019, it was the final round of the World Touring Car Championship. It often attracts local drivers competing alongside the series regulars, such as André Couto and Ao Chi Hong.

== Technical regulation changes ==
The race has run to different touring car rules as European touring car championships went through their own changes. The race was run to European Group 5 regulations in the early eighties, then adopted FIA Group A rules between 1983 and 1990. It then ran to DTM rules from 1991 to 1993 before changing to Super Touring rules in 1994. From 2000, it started using Super Production regulations until 2004, when it sampled Super 2000 machinery before being upgraded to a round of the FIA WTCC.

Since 2018, it has been run to TCR regulations.

== Sporting regulation changes ==
The race has changed in format over the years, from the 30 lapper back in the Group A era to the current, double race format with each race lasting 9 laps. Prior to becoming a round of the WTCC in 2005, the race was staged over two legs, with the winner being declared as the driver with the best time aggregated from both legs.

== Sponsors ==
The race has been sponsored by the Sociedade de Turismo e Diversões de Macau (STDM) since 2004. STDM boss Stanley Ho has presented the trophies to the race winners on the podium since the sponsorship began.

== Results ==
Year	Winner	Car	Runner-up	Car	Third place	Car
Production era
1963	(Hong Kong) Albert Poon	Ford Lotus Cortina	(Hong Kong) Charles Ching	Ford Lotus Cortina	K.F. Chang	Volvo P120
1964	(West Germany) Eugen Böhringer	Mercedes-Benz 300SE				
1965	(United States) Grant Wolfkill	Austin Cooper S	(Hong Kong) Walter Sulke	Austin Cooper S	(Hong Kong) Anthony Tsui	Austin Cooper S
1965	(United States) George Baker	Jaguar Mark 2	(Hong Kong) Frank Wong	Ford Corsair GT	(Hong Kong) Paul Chan	Ford Cortina GT
1966	(Belgium) Mauro Bianchi	Alpine A210				
1967	(Hong Kong) Albert Poon	Alfa Romeo GTA	(Japan) Yoshimi Katayama	Mazda 1000		
1968	(Hong Kong) Peter Chow	Alfa Romeo GTV	(Australia) Steve Harvey	BMC Mini Cooper S	(Australia) Brian Foley	Datsun Sunny
1969	(West Germany) Erich Waxenberger (Hong Kong) Albert Poon	Mercedes-Benz 300 SEL 6.3	(West Germany) Klaus Doerr (West Germany) Herb Adamczyk	Porsche 911S	(Singapore) Jan Bussell (United Kingdom) Ted Moorat	Mercedes-Benz 300 SEL 6.3
1970	(Singapore) Anne Wong	Austin Cooper S	(Hong Kong) Lucky Kirtisinghe	Austin Cooper S	(Hong Kong) Ahmed Khan	Ford Escort Twin-Cam
1971	(West Germany) Dieter Glemser	Ford Capri RS	(Hong Kong) Albert Poon	Alfa Romeo GTV	(Australia) Peter Brock	Holden LC Torana GTR XU-1
Group 4 & Group 1
1972	(Hong Kong) John MacDonald	Austin Cooper S	(Hong Kong) Harold Lee	Opel Ascona SR	(Hong Kong) Albert Poon	Opel Ascona SR
1973	(Hong Kong) Peter Chow	Toyota Celica GT (TA 22)	(Hong Kong) Harold Lee	Opel Ascona 1.9SR	(Philippines) Dante Silverio	Toyota Corolla Levin (TE27)
1974	(Japan) Nobuhide Tachi	Toyota Celica (TA 22)	(West Germany) Herbert Adamczyk	Porsche Carrera RS	(Hong Kong) Siu Man Tou	BMW 2002tii
1975	(Japan) Nobuhide Tachi	Toyota Celica (TA 22)	(Japan) Junichi Isobe	Toyota Celica	(Hong Kong) Ahmed Khan	Toyota Celica
1976	(West Germany) Herbert Adamczyk	Porsche Carrera RS	(Japan) Nobuhide Tachi	Toyota Celica (TA 22)	(Hong Kong) Jim Sweeney	Porsche Carrera RS
1977	(Hong Kong) Peter Chow	Toyota Celica	(Hong Kong) Ahmed Khan	Toyota Celica	(Japan) Junichi Isobe	Toyota Celica
1978	(Hong Kong) Peter Chow	Toyota Celica (TA 22)	(West Germany) Hans Heyer	Zakspeed Escort	(Japan) Haruhito Yanagida	Datsun 260Z
Group 5 & Group 1
1979	(West Germany) Herbert Adamczyk	Porsche 911 Carrera RSR 3.0^{A}	(Japan) Masahiro Hasemi	Datsun 160J	(Japan) Nobuhide Tachi	Toyota Starlet
1980	(West Germany) Hans-Joachim Stuck	BMW 320	(West Germany) Helmut Greiner	Porsche 911 Carrera RSR 3.0^{A}	(Hong Kong) Jim Sweeney	Porsche 911 Carrera RSR 3.0^{A}
1981	(West Germany) Manfred Winkelhock	BMW 320	(West Germany) Helmut Greiner	Porsche 911 Carrera RSR 3.0^{A}	(Japan) Nobuhide Tachi	Toyota Corolla Levin (E70)
1982	(West Germany) Helmut Greiner	Porsche 911 Carrera RSR 3.0^{A}	(Hong Kong) Adrian Fu	BMW 320	(Hong Kong) Peter Chow	Datsun Silvia
Group A
1983	(West Germany) Hans-Joachim Stuck	BMW 635 CSi	(Austria) Dieter Quester	BMW 635 CSi	(Hong Kong) Michael Lieu	Ford Capri
1984	(United Kingdom) Tom Walkinshaw	Jaguar XJS	(West Germany) Hans Heyer	Jaguar XJS	(West Germany) Hans-Joachim Stuck	BMW 635 CSi
1985	(Italy) Gianfranco Brancatelli	Volvo 240 Turbo	(Austria) Gerhard Berger	BMW 635 CSi	(Hong Kong) Michael Lieu	Mitsubishi Starion
1986	(Venezuela) Johnny Cecotto	Volvo 240 Turbo	(United Kingdom) Tom Walkinshaw	Rover 3500	(Sweden) Thomas Lindström	Volvo 240 Turbo
1987	(Italy) Roberto Ravaglia	BMW M3	(Austria) Dieter Quester	BMW M3	(France) Fabien Giroix	BMW M3
1988	(West Germany) Altfrid Heger	BMW M3	(West Germany) Markus Oestreich	BMW M3	(United Kingdom) Andy Rouse	Ford Sierra RS 500
1989	(United Kingdom) Tim Harvey	Ford Sierra RS 500	(United Kingdom) Andy Rouse	Ford Sierra RS 500	(Japan) Hisashi Yokoshima	Ford Sierra RS 500
1990	(Japan) Masahiro Hasemi	Nissan Skyline GT-R	(Italy) Emanuele Pirro	BMW M3	(Germany) Joachim Winkelhock	BMW M3
DTM & Group A
1991	(Italy) Emanuele Pirro	BMW M3 Evolution	(Denmark) Kurt Thiim	Mercedes-Benz 190E Evo.II	(Germany) Klaus Ludwig	Mercedes-Benz 190E Evo.II
1992	(Italy) Emanuele Pirro	BMW M3 Evolution	(Germany) Joachim Winkelhock	BMW M3 Evolution	(Italy) Roberto Ravaglia	BMW M3 Evolution
1993	(Hong Kong) Charles Kwan	BMW M3 Evolution	(Germany) Joachim Winkelhock	BMW 320i	(Italy) Emanuele Pirro	BMW 320i
Super Touring
1994	(Germany) Joachim Winkelhock	BMW 318i	(United Kingdom) Steve Soper	BMW 318i	(Denmark) Tom Kristensen	Toyota Corona
1995	(United Kingdom) Kelvin Burt	Toyota Corona EXIV	(United Kingdom) Steve Soper	BMW 318i	(United Kingdom) Julian Bailey	Toyota Corona EXIV
1996	(Germany) Frank Biela	Audi A4 Quattro	(Australia) Brad Jones	Audi A4 Quattro	(Germany) Michael Krumm	Toyota Corona EXIV
1997	(United Kingdom) Steve Soper	BMW 320i	(Germany) Michael Krumm	Toyota Corona EXIV	(Hong Kong) Charles Kwan	BMW 320i
1998	(Germany) Joachim Winkelhock	BMW 320i	(Italy) Max Angelelli	Toyota Corona EXIV	(Australia) Brad Jones	Audi A4 Quattro
1999	(Germany) Michael Bartels	Audi A4 Quattro	(Australia) Paul Morris	BMW 320i	(Germany) Oliver Mayer	Audi A4 Quattro
Super Production
2000	(Netherlands) Patrick Huisman	BMW 320i	(Hong Kong) Henry Lee Junior	Peugeot 306	(United Kingdom) Simon Harrison	Ford Focus
2001	(Netherlands) Duncan Huisman	BMW 320i	(Japan) Manabu Orido	Toyota Altezza	(Thailand) Nattavude Charoensukawattana	Peugeot 306
2002	(Netherlands) Duncan Huisman	BMW 320i	(Italy) Nicola Larini	Alfa Romeo 147	(Germany) Franz Engstler	BMW 320i
2003	(Netherlands) Duncan Huisman	BMW 320i	(Germany) Franz Engstler	BMW 320i	(Germany) Marc Hennerici	BMW 320i
Super 2000
2004	(Germany) Jörg Müller	BMW 320i	(United Kingdom) Andy Priaulx	BMW 320i	(Sweden) Rickard Rydell	SEAT Toledo Cupra
World Touring Car Championship (Super 2000)
2005	(Brazil) Augusto Farfus	Alfa Romeo 156	(United Kingdom) Andy Priaulx	BMW 320i	(Sweden) Rickard Rydell	SEAT Toledo Cupra
2005	(Netherlands) Duncan Huisman	BMW 320i	(United Kingdom) Andy Priaulx	BMW 320i	(Brazil) Augusto Farfus	Alfa Romeo 156
2006	(United Kingdom) Andy Priaulx	BMW 320si	(Netherlands) Duncan Huisman	BMW 320si	(France) Yvan Muller	SEAT León
2006	(Germany) Jörg Müller	BMW 320si	(France) Yvan Muller	SEAT León	(Netherlands) Tom Coronel	SEAT León
2007	(Switzerland) Alain Menu	Chevrolet Lacetti	(Italy) Gabriele Tarquini	SEAT León TDI	(United Kingdom) Rob Huff	Chevrolet Lacetti
2007	(United Kingdom) Andy Priaulx	BMW 320si	(Italy) Nicola Larini	Chevrolet Lacetti	(United Kingdom) James Thompson	Alfa Romeo 156
2008	(Switzerland) Alain Menu	Chevrolet Lacetti	(United Kingdom) Andy Priaulx	BMW 320si	(France) Yvan Muller	SEAT León TDI
2008	(United Kingdom) Rob Huff	Chevrolet Lacetti	(France) Yvan Muller	SEAT León TDI	(United Kingdom) Andy Priaulx	BMW 320si
2009	(United Kingdom) Rob Huff	Chevrolet Cruze	(Italy) Gabriele Tarquini	SEAT León TDI	(Spain) Jordi Gené	SEAT León TDI
2009	(Brazil) Augusto Farfus	BMW 320si	(Germany) Jörg Müller	BMW 320si	(France) Yvan Muller	SEAT León TDI
2010	(United Kingdom) Rob Huff	Chevrolet Cruze	(France) Yvan Muller	Chevrolet Cruze	(Portugal) Tiago Monteiro	SEAT León TDI
2010	(Hungary) Norbert Michelisz	SEAT León TDI	(Italy) Gabriele Tarquini	SEAT León TDI	(United Kingdom) Rob Huff	Chevrolet Cruze
2011	(United Kingdom) Rob Huff	Chevrolet Cruze 1.6T	(France) Yvan Muller	Chevrolet Cruze 1.6T	(Italy) Gabriele Tarquini	Sunred SR León 1.6T
2011	(United Kingdom) Rob Huff	Chevrolet Cruze 1.6T	(Netherlands) Tom Coronel	BMW 320 TC	(France) Yvan Muller	Chevrolet Cruze 1.6T
2012	(France) Yvan Muller	Chevrolet Cruze 1.6T	(Switzerland) Alain Menu	Chevrolet Cruze 1.6T	(Portugal) Tiago Monteiro	Honda Civic Super 2000 TC
2012	(Switzerland) Alain Menu	Chevrolet Cruze 1.6T	(United Kingdom) Rob Huff	Chevrolet Cruze 1.6T	(France) Yvan Muller	Chevrolet Cruze 1.6T
2013	(France) Yvan Muller	Chevrolet Cruze 1.6T	(Portugal) Tiago Monteiro	Honda Civic WTCC	(United Kingdom) Rob Huff	SEAT León WTCC
2013	(United Kingdom) Rob Huff	SEAT León WTCC	(Spain) Pepe Oriola	Chevrolet Cruze 1.6T	(Netherlands) Tom Coronel	BMW 320 TC
World Touring Car Championship (TC1 & TC2)
2014	(Argentina) José María López	Citroën C-Elysée WTCC	(Hungary) Norbert Michelisz	Honda Civic WTCC	(Italy) Gabriele Tarquini	Honda Civic WTCC
2014	(United Kingdom) Rob Huff	LADA Granta 1.6T	(France) Yvan Muller	Citroën C-Elysée WTCC	(France) Hugo Valente	Chevrolet RML Cruze TC1
TCR International Series (TCR)
2015	(United Kingdom) Rob Huff	Honda Civic Type R TCR (FK2)	(Spain) Jordi Gené	SEAT León Racer	(Switzerland) Stefano Comini	SEAT León Racer
2015	(Switzerland) Stefano Comini	SEAT León Racer	(Italy) Andrea Belicchi	SEAT León Racer	(Russia) Mikhail Grachev	Volkswagen Golf GTi TCR
2016	(Switzerland) Stefano Comini	Volkswagen Golf GTi TCR	(France) Jean-Karl Vernay	Volkswagen Golf GTi TCR	(Portugal) Tiago Monteiro	Honda Civic Type R TCR (FK2)
2016	(Portugal) Tiago Monteiro	Honda Civic Type R TCR (FK2)	(France) Jean-Karl Vernay	Volkswagen Golf GTi TCR	(Spain) Pepe Oriola	SEAT León TCR
World Touring Car Championship (TC1)
2017	(Morocco) Mehdi Bennani	Citroën C-Elysée WTCC	(Netherlands) Tom Coronel	Chevrolet RML Cruze TC1	(Japan) Ryo Michigami	Honda Civic WTCC
2017	(United Kingdom) Rob Huff	Citroën C-Elysée WTCC	(Hungary) Norbert Michelisz	Honda Civic WTCC	(United Kingdom) Tom Chilton	Citroën C-Elysée WTCC
World Touring Car Cup (TCR)
2018	(France) Jean-Karl Vernay	Audi RS 3 LMS TCR	(France) Yvan Muller	Hyundai i30 N TCR	(United Kingdom) Rob Huff	Volkswagen Golf GTi TCR
2018	(Belgium) Frédéric Vervisch	Audi RS 3 LMS TCR	(Germany) Timo Scheider	Honda Civic Type R TCR (FK8)	(France) Yvan Muller	Hyundai i30 N TCR
2018	(Argentina) Esteban Guerrieri	Honda Civic Type R TCR (FK8)	(United Kingdom) Rob Huff	Volkswagen Golf GTi TCR	(Hungary) Norbert Michelisz	Hyundai i30 N TCR
2019	(France) Yvan Muller	Lynk & Co 03 TCR	(Hungary) Norbert Michelisz	Hyundai i30 N TCR	(Italy) Kevin Ceccon	Alfa Romeo Giulietta TCR
2019	(France) Yvan Muller	Lynk & Co 03 TCR	(Sweden) Thed Björk	Lynk & Co 03 TCR	(Italy) Kevin Ceccon	Alfa Romeo Giulietta TCR
2019	(United Kingdom) Andy Priaulx	Lynk & Co 03 TCR	(United Kingdom) Rob Huff	Volkswagen Golf GTi TCR	(France) Jean-Karl Vernay	Audi RS 3 LMS TCR
TCR China (TCR)
2020	(United Kingdom) Rob Huff (Note: The first race counted as Race 1 for the TCR China Touring Car Championship, but as the Qualification Race for the Macau Guia Race.)	MG6 TCR	(China) Ma Qinghua	Lynk & Co 03 TCR	(Macau) Filipe Clemente de Souza	Audi RS 3 LMS TCR
2020	(China) Jason Zhang Zhi Qiang (Note: The second race counted as Race 2 for the TCR China Touring Car Championship, but as the Main Race for the Macau Guia Race.)	Lynk & Co 03 TCR	(Hong Kong) Sunny Wong Yat Shing	Lynk & Co 03 TCR	(Hong Kong) Lo Sze Ho	Honda Civic Type R TCR (FK2)
TCR Asia (TCR)
2021	(China) Ma Qinghua	Lynk & Co 03 TCR	(China) Jason Zhang Zhi Qiang	Lynk & Co 03 TCR	(Hong Kong) Lo Sze Ho	Hyundai i30 N TCR
2021	(China) Jason Zhang Zhi Qiang	Lynk & Co 03 TCR	(China) Ma Qinghua	Lynk & Co 03 TCR	(China) Yang Xiao Wei	CUPRA TCR
TCR Asia Challenge (TCR) (Note: The 2022 TCR Asia Challenge is the Guia Race of 2022.)
2022	(Macau) Filipe de Souza	Audi RS 3 LMS TCR (2021)	(China) HU Heng	Audi RS 3 LMS TCR (2021)	(Macau) Cheong Chi On	Audi RS 3 LMS TCR (2021)
2022	(Macau) Filipe de Souza	Audi RS 3 LMS TCR (2021)	(Hong Kong) Lo Sze Ho	Hyundai i30 N TCR	(Hong Kong) Yan Cheuk Wai	Honda Civic Type R TCR (FK8)
TCR World Tour (TCR)
2023	(Hungary) Norbert Michelisz	Hyundai Elantra N TCR	(Argentina) Néstor Girolami	Honda Civic Type R TCR (FL5)	(United Kingdom) Robert Huff	Audi RS 3 LMS TCR (2021)
2023	(Belgium) Frédéric Vervisch	Audi RS 3 LMS TCR (2021)	(Uruguay) Santiago Urrutia	Lynk & Co 03 FL TCR	(France) Yann Ehrlacher	Lynk & Co 03 FL TCR
2024	(Sweden) Thed Björk	Lynk & Co 03 FL TCR	(Hungary) Norbert Michelisz	Hyundai Elantra N TCR (2024)	(Spain) Mikel Azcona	Hyundai Elantra N TCR (2024)
2024	(Serbia) Dušan Borković	Honda Civic Type R TCR (FL5)	(Argentina) Esteban Guerrieri	Honda Civic Type R TCR (FL5)	(Italy) Marco Butti	Honda Civic Type R TCR (FL5)
2025	(Argentina) Néstor Girolami	Hyundai Elantra N TCR (2024)	(Spain) Mikel Azcona	Hyundai Elantra N TCR (2024)	(France) Yann Ehrlacher	Lynk & Co 03 FL TCR
2025	(Australia) Josh Buchan	Hyundai Elantra N TCR (2024)	(China) Ma Qinghua	Hyundai Elantra N TCR (2024)	(Sweden) Thed Björk	Lynk & Co 03 FL TCR
2026	(Argentina) Santiago Urrutia	Geely Preface TCR	(Spain) Mikel Azcona	Hyundai Elantra N EV TCR	(Hungary) Norbert Michelisz	Hyundai Elantra N EV TCR
2026	(China) Ma Qinghua	Geely Preface TCR	(Sweden) Thed Björk	Geely Preface TCR	(Hungary) Norbert Michelisz	Hyundai Elantra N EV TCR

^A The car was in fact, a Porsche 911 Carrera RSR 3.0 with 935 bodykit.

=== Most wins ===
After the "official" inaugural race in 1972

==== By driver ====
Wins	Driver	Years
10	(United Kingdom) Robert Huff	2008-Race 2, 2009-Race 1, 2010-Race 1, 2011-Race 1, 2011-Race 2, 2013-Race 2, 2014-Race 2, 2015-Race 1, 2017-Main Race, 2020-Race 1
4	(Netherlands) Duncan Huisman	2001, 2002, 2003, 2005-Race 2
4	(France) Yvan Muller	2012-Race 1, 2013-Race 1, 2019-Race 1, 2019-Race 2
3	(Hong Kong) Peter Chow	1973, 1977, 1978
3	(Switzerland) Alain Menu	2007-Race 1, 2008-Race 1, 2012-Race 2
3	(United Kingdom) Andy Priaulx	2006-Race 1, 2007-Race 2, 2019-Race 3
2	(Japan) Nobuhide Tachi	1974, 1975
2	(West Germany) Herbert Adamczyk	1976, 1979
2	(West Germany) Hans-Joachim Stuck	1980, 1983
2	(Italy) Emanuele Pirro	1991, 1992
2	(Germany) Joachim Winkelhock	1994, 1998
2	(Germany) Jörg Müller	2004, 2006-Race 2
2	(Brazil) Augusto Farfus	2005-Race 1, 2009-Race 2
2	(Switzerland) Stefano Comini	2015-Race 2, 2016-Race 1
2	(China) Jason Zhang Zhi Qiang	2020-Race 2, 2021-Race 2
2	(Macau) Filipe de Souza	2022-Race 1, 2022-Race 2
2	(Hungary) Norbert Michelisz	2010-Race 2, 2023-Race 1
2	(Belgium) Frédéric Vervisch	2018-Race 2, 2023-Race 2

==== By nationality of drivers ====
Win(s)	Nation	Years
17	United Kingdom	1984, 1989, 1995, 1997, 2006-Race 1, 2007-Race 2, 2008-Race 2, 2009-Race 1, 2010-Race 1, 2011-Race 1, 2011-Race 2, 2013-Race 2, 2014-Race 2, 2015-Race 1, 2017-Main Race, 2019-Race 3, 2020-Race 1
11	Germany	1980, 1981, 1982, 1983, 1988, 1994, 1996, 1998, 1999, 2004, 2006-Race 2
7	Hong Kong	1972, 1973, 1976, 1977, 1978, 1979, 1993
5	France	2012-Race 1, 2013-Race 1, 2018-Race 1, 2019-Race 1, 2019-Race 2
5	Netherlands	2000, 2001, 2002, 2003, 2005-Race 2
5	Switzerland	2007-Race 1, 2008-Race 1, 2012-Race 2, 2015-Race 2, 2016-Race 1
4	Italy	1985, 1987, 1991, 1992
3	Argentina	2014-Race 1, 2018-Race 3, 2025-Race 1
3	China	2020-Race 2, 2021-Race 1, 2021-Race 2
3	Japan	1974, 1975, 1990
2	Belgium	2018-Race 2, 2023-Race 2
2	Brazil	2005-Race 1, 2009-Race 2
2	Hungary	2010-Race 2, 2023-Race 1
2	Macau	2022-Race 1, 2022-Race 2
1	Australia	2025-Race 2
1	Morocco	2017-Opening Race
1	Portugal	2016-Race 2
1	Serbia	2024-Race 2
1	Sweden	2024-Race 1
1	Venezuela	1986

==== By manufacturer ====
Win(s)	Manufacturer	Years
21	(Germany) BMW	1980, 1981, 1983, 1987, 1988, 1991, 1992, 1993, 1994, 1997, 1998, 2000, 2001, 2002, 2003, 2004, 2005-Race 2, 2006-Race 1, 2006-Race 2, 2007-Race 2, 2009-Race 2
10	(United States) Chevrolet	2007-Race 1, 2008-Race 1, 2008-Race 2, 2009-Race 1, 2010-Race 1, 2011-Race 1, 2011-Race 2, 2012-Race 1, 2012-Race 2, 2013-Race 1
7	(Germany) Audi	1996, 1999, 2018-Race 1, 2018-Race 2, 2022-Race 1, 2022-Race 2, 2023-Race 2
7	(China) Lynk & Co	2019-Race 1, 2019-Race 2, 2019-Race 3, 2020-Race 2, 2021-Race 1, 2021-Race 2, 2024-Race 1
6	(Japan) Toyota	1973, 1974, 1975, 1977, 1978, 1995
4	(Japan) Honda	2015-Race 1, 2016-Race 2, 2018-Race 3, 2024-Race 2
3	(West Germany) Porsche	1976, 1979, 1982
3	(Spain) SEAT	2010-Race 2, 2013-Race 2, 2015-Race 2
3	(France) Citroën	2014-Race 1, 2017-Opening Race, 2017-Main Race
3	(South Korea) Hyundai	2023-Race 1, 2025-Race 1, 2025-Race 2
2	(Sweden) Volvo	1985, 1986
1	(United Kingdom) Austin	1972
1	(United Kingdom) Jaguar	1984
1	(United Kingdom) Ford	1989
1	(Japan) Nissan	1990
1	(Italy) Alfa Romeo	2005-Race 1
1	(Russia) Lada	2014-Race 2
1	(Germany) Volkswagen	2016-Race 1
1	(United Kingdom) MG	2020-Race 1

== See also ==
- Guia Circuit
- World Touring Car Championship
