= Nobuhide Tachi =

Japanese racing driver

Nobuhide Tachi (舘 信秀, Tachi Nobuhide; born March 23, 1947 in Suzuka, Mie) is a Japanese former racing driver, and the co-founder of TOM'S, a Japanese racing team and tuner for Toyota and Lexus.

His son, Shingo, was also a racing driver.

== Career ==
=== Racing career ===
Tachi was born in Suzuka, Japan. Kenji Mimura, the founder of Maki, has been his friend since their high school years. Originally, Tachi did not like automobiles because he would become carsick. But the influence of his friend led him to automobile racing.

Tachi began car racing in 1965 and became a factory-driver for Toyota from 1971.

In 1974, Tachi founded TOM'S with ex-Toyota dealer, Kiyoshi Oiwa. The name of "TOM'S" is an abbreviation of "Tachi", "Oiwa", and "MotorSports".

Tachi continued his career as a racing driver until 1982. After retirement, he occasionally returned to race but has usually concentrated on management of his company.

=== Political career ===
On 21 May 2010, Your Party announced that Tachi would represent the party as a proportional candidate in the 2010 House of Councillors election.

Sporting positions
Preceded by Peter Chow	Guia Race winner 1974–1975	Succeeded by Herb Adamczyk
