= Ralt RT3 =

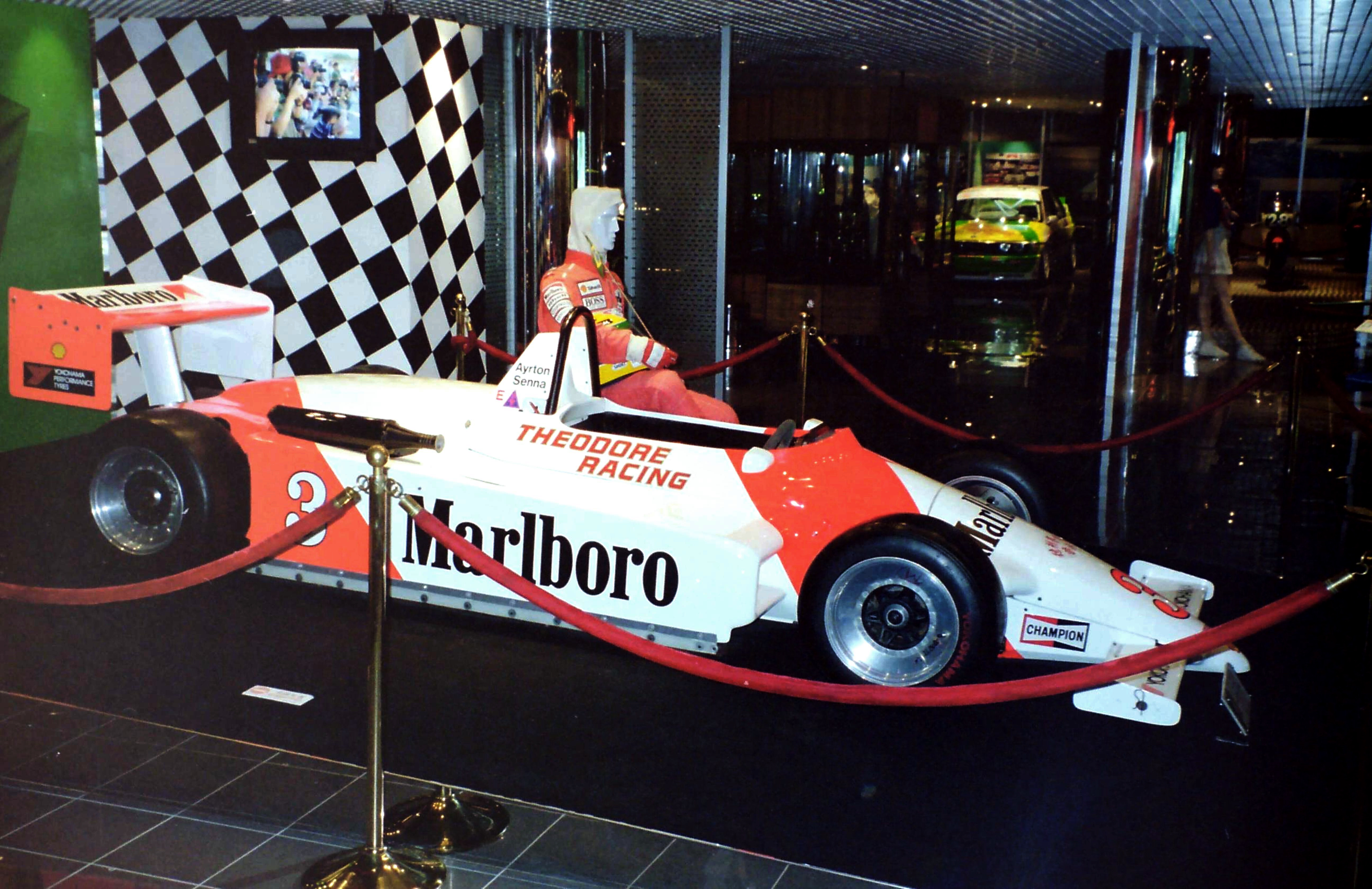
- Category: Formula 3
- Constructor: Ralt
- Designer(s): Ron Tauranac

Technical specifications
- Chassis: Aluminum monocoque with rear sub-frame
- Engine: Mid-engine, longitudinally mounted, Alfa Romeo/Toyota/Volkswagen, 2.0–2.4 L (122.0–146.5 cu in), I4, NA
- Transmission: Hewland 5-speed manual
- Power: ~ 165 hp (123 kW)
- Weight: 455 kg (1,003 lb)
- Tyres: Michelin

Competition history
- Debut: 1979

The Ralt RT3 is an open-wheel Formula 3 race car, developed and built by Ralt in 1979.

== Design ==
The car, designed by Ron Tauranac, was equipped with a particularly elaborate ground effect system and implemented an aluminum monocoque frame with a honeycomb structure to contain the weight. The suspension was mounted a lot inside the chassis, so much so that it allowed a more aerodynamic development of the bodywork in such a way that it allowed an improvement in the ground effect. A five-speed Hewland gearbox operated various four-cylinder engines of Alfa Romeo, Toyota, and Volkswagen origin.

== Racing history ==
The RT3, an evolution of the previous RT1, was entered in the Formula 3 championships during the 1979 season, lagging behind the other cars lined up by the various teams. For this reason, only four examples were built. The excessive heaviness precluded a good performance for the rest of the season. Despite this, the entire structure was refurbished and between 1980 and 1984 the car achieved numerous successes such as the British Formula 3 championship won by Ayrton Senna and the European championship won by Pierluigi Martini. A change in legislation in 1985 made it obsolete and led to its replacement.
