= 1993 Indonesian Grand Prix =

- Formula Holden Race

Race details
- Date: August 21–22 1993
- Location: Sentul International Circuit, Citeureup, Bogor, West Java, Indonesia
- Course: Permanent racing facility
- Course length: 4.12 km (2.56 miles)
- Distance: 2x20 laps, 164.8 km (102.4 miles)

Pole position
Driver	(Australia) Mark Larkham	Larkham Motorsport
- Time: 1:24.217

Podium
First	(Australia) Mark Larkham	Larkham Motorsport
Second	(Australia) Paul Stokell	Birrana Racing
Third	(Australia) Graham Watson	

The 1993 Indonesian Grand Prix was a Formula Brabham race held on August 21–22, 1993 at the Sentul International Circuit near Citeureup, Indonesia. It was the first round of a two event Pan-Pacific series for the Australian-based Formula Brabham category.

== Summary ==
The 1993 was the first race held at the newly constructed state-owned Sentul International Circuit, built in an attempt to secure a Formula One Grand Prix from 1994 onwards. With no local form of open wheel motor racing occurring in Indonesia (as it had been several years since a motor racing circuit had operated in the country), organisers looked into importing a field of racing. After investigating the potential costs of importing the European Formula 3000 Championship and several Formula 3 series, the geographically closer Australian Formula Brabham series was selected.

To increase local interest, a selection of Indonesian drivers were brought in to fill the field. These were led by Tommy Suharto, son of incumbent Indonesian president Suharto, but also included Tinton Soeprapto (father of Ananda Mikola and Moreno Soeprapto) and leading Indonesian driving instructor Aswin Bahar. For Suharto's protection, a 300m long pane of bulletproof glass was installed around the main grandstand and Indonesian military were stationed in the surrounding mountainside.

1989 Driver to Europe champion Mark Larkham qualified on pole for the two-legged affair ahead of Paul Stokell and reigning CAMS Gold Star winner Mark Skaife. The leading local entrant was Bahar in 12th. Rival competitors were forced into signing a waiver allowing Suharto to compete with a Mugen-Honda V8 Formula 3000 engine in his car (compared to the regular Holden V6) but in the interests of fairness he was required to start from the back of the grid. Larkham went on to win both races as Suharto crashed at the first corner of the first heat in his overpowered Reynard. Stokell trailed home Larkham in each heat, followed by Graham Watson in Heat 1 and Skaife in Heat 2. Bahar remained the best local with a fourth-placed finish in the opening race.

== Classification ==
=== Qualifying ===
Pos	No	Nat	Driver	Car	Lap	Gap
1	2	(Australia)	Mark Larkham	Reynard 91D Holden	1:24.217	
2	9	(Australia)	Paul Stokell	Reynard 90D Holden	1:24.986	+0.769
3	1	(Australia)	Mark Skaife	Lola T91/50 Holden	1:25.551	+1.334
4		(Australia)	Simon Kane	Ralt RT21 Holden	1:25.976	+1.759
5	70	(Australia)	Kevin Weeks	Reynard 90D Holden		
6	74	(Australia)	Chris Hocking	Reynard 90D Holden		
7	78	(Australia)	Brian Sampson	Cheetah Mk.9 Holden		
8		(Australia)	Mark McLaughlin	Reynard 90D Holden		
9	5	(Australia)	Mark Poole	Shrike NB89H Holden		
10		(Australia)	Graham Watson	Ralt RT21 Holden		
11	99	(Australia)	Albert Callegher	Ralt RT21 Holden		
12		(Indonesia)	Aswin Bahar	Reynard 90D Holden		
13	18	(Australia)	Chris Clearihan	Ralt RT20 Holden		
14	8	(Australia)	John Hermann	Ralt RT20 Holden		
15		(Indonesia)	Tinton Soeprapto	Reynard 90D Holden		
16		(Indonesia)	Amin Mahfud	Reynard 90D Holden		
18		(Australia)	Colin Milne	Hocking 911 Holden		
19	3	(Australia)	Alan Galloway	Reynard 90D Holden		
20*		(Indonesia)	Tommy Soeharto	Reynard 92D Mugen-Honda		

- Tommy Soeharto, the youngest son of then Indonesian president Suharto, qualified 17th but engine problems forced the team to replace the V6 Holden engine with a V8 Mugen-Honda Formula 3000 engine and only started with the approval of the other competitors.

=== Race 1 ===
Pos	No	Driver	Constructor	Laps	Time/Retired	Grid	Points
1	2	(Australia) Mark Larkham	Reynard 91D Holden	20		1	20
2	9	(Australia) Paul Stokell	Reynard 90D Holden	20		2	15
3		(Australia) Graham Watson	Ralt RT21 Holden	20		10	12
4		(Indonesia) Aswin Bahar	Reynard 90D Holden	19		12	10
5	78	(Australia) Brian Sampson	Cheetah Mk.9 Holden			7	8
6		(Australia) Simon Kane	Ralt RT21 Holden			4	6
7	1	(Australia) Mark Skaife	Lola T91/50 Holden			3	4
8	18	(Australia) Chris Clearihan	Ralt RT20 Holden			13	3
9		(Indonesia) Tinton Soeprapto	Reynard 90D Holden			15	2
10	8	(Australia) John Hermann	Ralt RT20 Holden			14	1
Ret	70	(Australia) Kevin Weeks	Reynard 90D Holden				
Ret	74	(Australia) Chris Hocking	Reynard 90D Holden				
Ret	5	(Australia) Mark Poole	Shrike NB89H Holden				
Ret	99	(Australia) Albert Callegher	Ralt RT21 Holden				
Ret	3	(Australia) Alan Galloway	Reynard 90D Holden				
Ret		(Indonesia) Tommy Soeharto	Reynard 92D Mugen-Honda				

=== Race 2 ===
Pos	No	Driver	Constructor	Laps	Time/Retired	Grid	Points
1	2	(Australia) Mark Larkham	Reynard 91D Holden	20		1	20
2	9	(Australia) Paul Stokell	Reynard 90D Holden	20		2	15
3	1	(Australia) Mark Skaife	Lola T91/50 Holden			7	12
4		(Australia) Simon Kane	Ralt RT21 Holden			6	10
5	70	(Australia) Kevin Weeks	Reynard 90D Holden				8
6		(Australia) Graham Watson	Ralt RT21 Holden			3	6
7		(Indonesia) Aswin Bahar	Reynard 90D Holden			4	4
8	18	(Australia) Chris Clearihan	Ralt RT20 Holden			8	3
9	78	(Australia) Brian Sampson	Cheetah Mk.9 Holden			5	2
10	8	(Australia) John Hermann	Ralt RT20 Holden			10	1
Ret		(Indonesia) Tinton Soeprapto	Reynard 90D Holden			9	
Ret	74	(Australia) Chris Hocking	Reynard 90D Holden				
Ret	99	(Australia) Albert Callegher	Ralt RT21 Holden				
Ret		(Indonesia) Tommy Soeharto	Reynard 92D Mugen-Honda				
Ret		(Indonesia) Amin Mahfud	Reynard 90D Holden				
DNS	5	(Australia) Mark Poole	Shrike NB89H Holden				

== Points ==
Pos	Driver	R1	R2	Total
1	Mark Larkham	20	20	40
2	Paul Stokell	15	15	30
3	Graham Watson	12	6	18
4	Mark Skaife	4	12	16
5	Simon Kane	6	10	16
6	Aswin Bahar	10	4	14
7	Brian Sampson	8	2	10
8	Kevin Weeks		8	8
9	Chris Clearihan	3	3	6
10	John Hermann	1	1	2
11	Tinton Soeprapto	2		2
