= Anson SA4 =

- Category: Formula 3
- Constructor: Anson

Technical specifications
- Chassis: Carbon-fiber/Aluminum monocoque with rear sub-frame covered in carbon-fiber body
- Suspension (front): Double wishbones, Coil springs over Dampers, Anti-roll bar
- Suspension (rear): Twin lower links, Single top links, twin trailing arms, Coil springs over Dampers, Anti-roll bar
- Engine: Volkswagen, mid-engined, longitudinally mounted, 1.6 L (97.6 cu in), I4, NA
- Transmission: Hewland Mk.9 5-speed manual

Competition history
- Debut: 1983

The Anson SA4 is an open-wheel race car, designed, developed and built by British manufacturer Anson Cars, for Formula 3 racing categories, in 1983.
