= Robert Ritchie (racing driver) =

Hong Kong racecar driver

Robert Ritchie was a Hong Kong racecar driver who won the Macau Grand Prix in 1955. At the time of his win, he was a sergeant in the Royal Air Force.

Sporting positions
Preceded by Eduardo de Carvalho	Macau Grand Prix; Winner; 1955	Succeeded by Doug Steane
