= John MacDonald (racing driver) =

Hong Kong racing driver (1936–2026)

John MacDonald (27 May 1936 – 28 January 2026) was a Hong Kong racing car driver and a motorcycle racer. He was originally from England, where he started his career racing motorcycles, then cars, until he entered National Service. He then lived in Hong Kong and raced as a competitor of Hong Kong, where he owned a garage business. He is best known as the most successful driver in the Macau Grand Prix during the early 1970s.

MacDonald was the only person to have won all the international races of Macau; Macau Grand Prix (1965, 1972, 1973 and 1975), Macau motorcycle Grand Prix (1969) and Macau Guia Race (1972). He was also the winner of the most Macau Grand Prix competitions, with 4 wins, and the first winner of the Guia Race in 1972.

In addition to his Macau victories, MacDonald won the Malaysian Grand Prix four times. He also won the 1976 Indonesian Grand Prix.

MacDonald died on 28 January 2026. He was 89.

Sporting positions
Preceded by Albert Poon	Macau Grand Prix; Winner; 1965	Succeeded by Mauro Bianchi
Preceded by Hiroshi Hasegawa	Macau Motorcycle Grand Prix; Winner; 1969	Succeeded by Benny Hidajat
Preceded by Jan Bussell	Macau Grand Prix; Winner; 1972 - 1973	Succeeded by Vern Schuppan
Preceded by Vern Schuppan	Macau Grand Prix; Winner; 1975	Succeeded by Vern Schuppan
Preceded by none	Guia Race winner 1972	Succeeded by Peter Chow
Preceded by none	Indonesian Grand Prix; Winner; 1976	Succeeded by Mark Larkham
