= Jan Bussell =

British racing driver (born 1930)

Francis Jan Bussell (born 27 July 1930) was a British racing driver who was the founder of Malaysia Air Charter, who won the Macau Grand Prix twice, in 1968 and 1971.

== Biography ==
Bussell was born on 27 July 1930. In the 1972 Singapore Grand Prix, he escaped a crash where fuel set one of his rear tyres and then his entire car on fire.

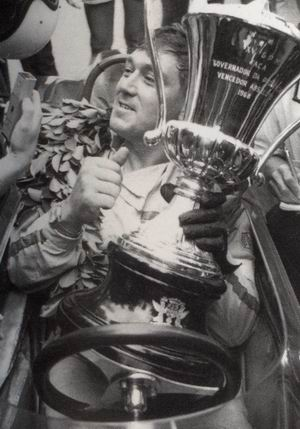
Jan Bussell in 1960

Sporting positions
Preceded by Tony Maw	Macau Grand Prix; Winner; 1968	Succeeded by Kevin Bartlett
Preceded by Dieter Quester	Macau Grand Prix; Winner; 1971	Succeeded by John MacDonald
