= Albert Poon =

Hong Kong racing driver

Albert Poon Bing-Lit 潘炳烈
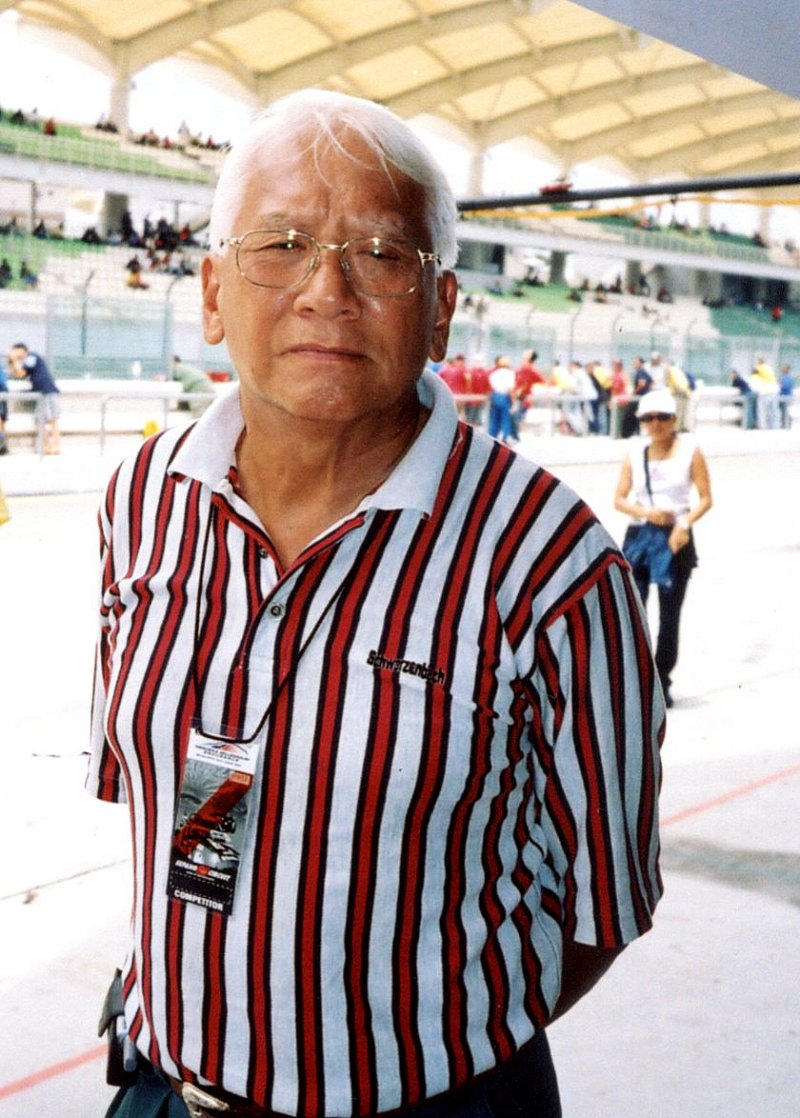
- Albert Poon at Sepang International Circuit in 2003.
- Nationality: Hong Konger
- Born: 5 January 1936 (age 90) British Hong Kong
- Retired: 2013
- Relatives: Lana Wong (wife)
- Years active: 1959–2013

Championship titles
- 1964: Macau Grand Prix

Albert Poon Bing-Lit (潘炳烈; born 5 January 1936 in Hong Kong) is a racing driver from Hong Kong, China. He is best known for winning the Macau Grand Prix in 1964, the only Hong Kong driver to win the event. Poon's name is synonymous with the Macau Grand Prix as he holds the record for competing in the most consecutive Macau Grand Prix. Beginning with his first race in 1961, Poon competed for the last time in 1982, the year before the race switched to Formula 3.

== Racing career ==
Poon went over to Macau to watch the Macau Grand Prix in 1958 and he said, "'I want to do that' and the next year I was in it." Poon took third place in 1962 at Macau in a Jaguar E-type owned by barrister Charles Ching. In 1963, Poon acquired his first real racing car - a Lotus 23. The $36,000 purchase price came courtesy of a Government loan.

The first time Poon drove the Lotus 23 in a race he won the 1963 Singapore Grand Prix and later the Malaysian Grand Prix in Johor Bahru., the first person to win both races in the same year. He also won the Production Car race at Macau in a Lotus Ford Cortina.

After six years of trying, Poon finally won at Macau in 1964, establishing a new lap record in doing so. He won with three laps to spare and took home a cheque for $10,000.

In 1965, Poon won the Singapore and Malaysian Grand Prix again. But Poon was denied leave by the Royal Hong Kong Police to take part in the Tengku Abdul Rahman races in Kuala Lumpur and subsequently resigned from the force, in order "to devote more time to motor racing". In the Macau Grand Prix that year, Poon was forced to drop out of the race with engine trouble while leading.

In 1966, Albert Poon placed first overall in the Singapore Grand Prix in the point standings for the saloon and touring cars and the Grand Prix. Placed second in the actual Grand Prix. In the same year, Alfa Romeo set up a company in Hong Kong to re-export its cars to the South East Asia market, with Albert Poon as its head.

For 1967, Poon won the Production Car race in his Alfa Romeo at the Macau and Johor Grand Prix. He set a lap record in the Macau Grand Prix but failed to finish the race. Poon also came second in the Singapore Grand Prix.

In 1968, Albert Poon won the Selangor Grand Prix in Malaysia.

In 1969 Poon won the Asian Karting Grand Prix in Manila and the Singapore Grand Prix. For the Macau Grand Prix, Poon bought a Brabham BT30 for $80,000 and came second in the Macau Grand Prix. He recounted, 'I bought a Formula 2 car for Macau and thought I was going to win for sure. It was a former Piers Courage-winning car in Britain. At the 11th hour, the organisers said they were going to allow Australian Kevin Bartlett to race with a V8-powered Alfa Romeo. 'What could I say? I was an Alfa Romeo dealer at the time, so I said, 'Of course', knowing full well that he was going to beat me, which he did.'

In 1970 Poon finished second, both in the Philippines Grand Prix and in the Macau Grand Prix where, after crashing his main car against the seawall earlier in the race, used an older back-up car. In the same year, Albert Poon took his Alfa Romeo GTA to victory of the Royal Perak 200 at the Tosek industrial site in Ipoh, beating Japanese ace drivers Tohiro Kenji and Masahiro Hasemi in the process.

In 1973, Albert Poon won the 50-lap Production Race in Malaysia. Placed second in the Malaysian Grand Prix.

Diana Poon, ex-wife of Albert Poon, raced alongside her husband in the 1976 Macau Grand Prix, becoming the first-ever couple to compete in the GP.

Ever since Macau Grand Prix switched to Formula 3 cars, Albert Poon focused his efforts on the Guia Race of Macau. He also drove a Ford Mondeo in 1996 using car number 20 for Team Petronas. Albert Poon also entered the 1997 Australian Super Touring Championship but did not start any race.

In the 2002 Merdeka Millennium Endurance Race held at the Sepang International Circuit, Albert Poon partnered Neville McKay and Jose Catita in a Mallock in the Group A which is opened to any production sports car of any capacity and any saloon cars above 1900cc.

For the Macau Grand Prix's 60th anniversary in 2013, Albert Poon competed in the Lotus Greater China Race where all drivers drive in standard 1.6 litre Lotus Elises. Poon acknowledged the differences between the old days and modern day racing especially in terms of safety "and landscape." As he mentioned, "the circuit remains exactly the same but the [surrounding] landscape has changed drastically."

== Rallying ==
Poon drove in the 555 Rally from Hong Kong to Beijing in Oct 1994 in a Nissan Pulsar.

== Personal life ==
Poon studied at Diocesan Boys' School. He is a former policeman and car dealer and is father of three children. Poon left the Police force in 1966 to enter the commercial vehicle industry and focus on racing.

Sporting positions
Preceded by Arsenio Laurel	Macau Grand Prix; Winner; 1964	Succeeded by John MacDonald
