= Ralt RT1 =

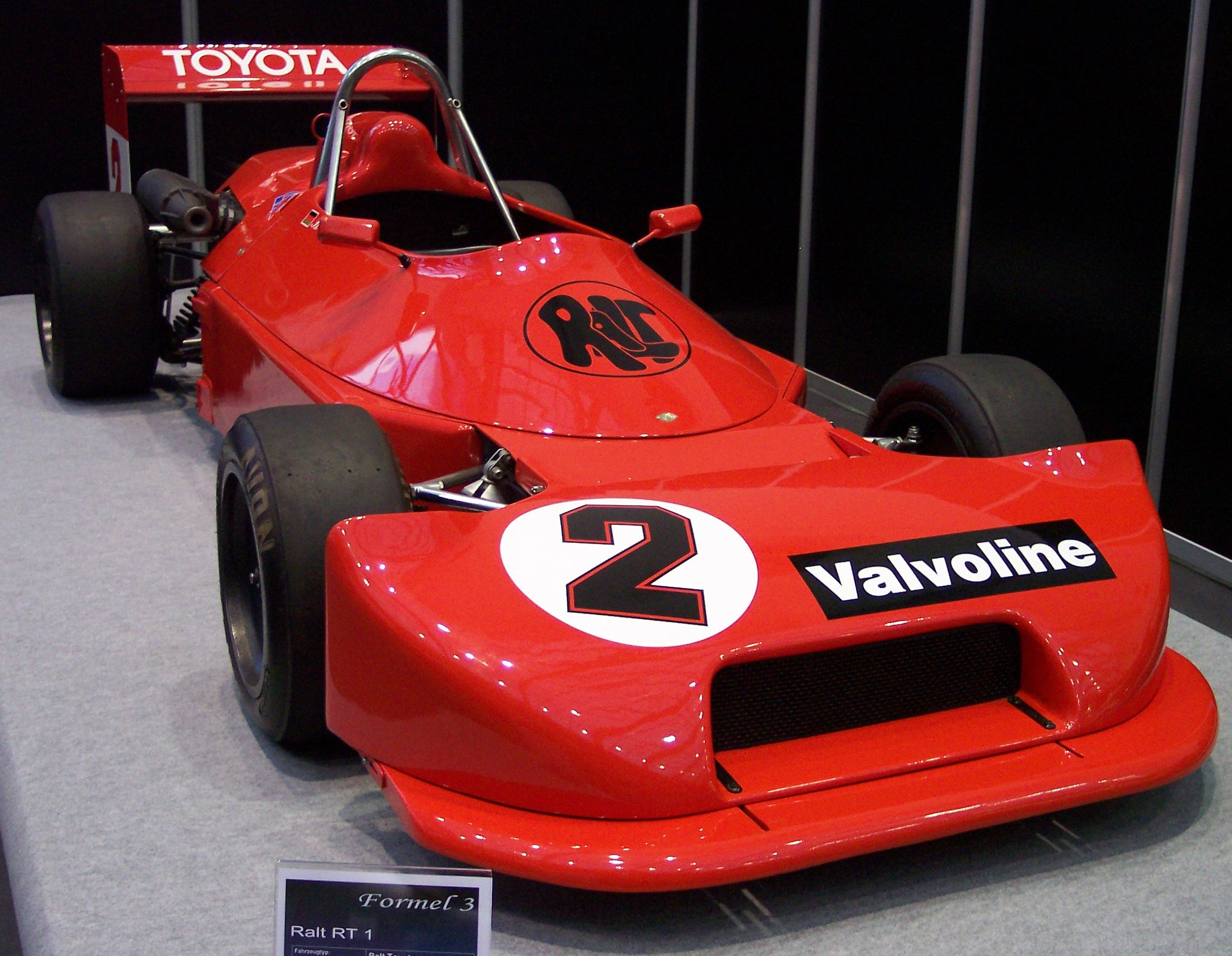
1978 Ralt RT1 F3 chassis

The Ralt RT1 is a race car chassis produced by Ralt, and was the first modern car produced by the company. It saw widespread use in a number of different motorsports categories, mostly open-wheel racing, but later including sports car racing. It was powered by a number of different four-cylinder engines of about 1.6 L (98 cu in) in displacement, of different origin, including Hart, Cosworth, Toyota, and Volkswagen engines.

== Design and development ==
The RT1 used a monocoque chassis, covered in a fiberglass body. This meant it was very light, weighing only 1,100 lb (500 kg). It was powered by a 1.6 L (98 cu in) four-cylinder engine, generating 230 hp (170 kW), which droves the rear wheels via a Hewland F.T.200 5-speed manual

== Racing history ==
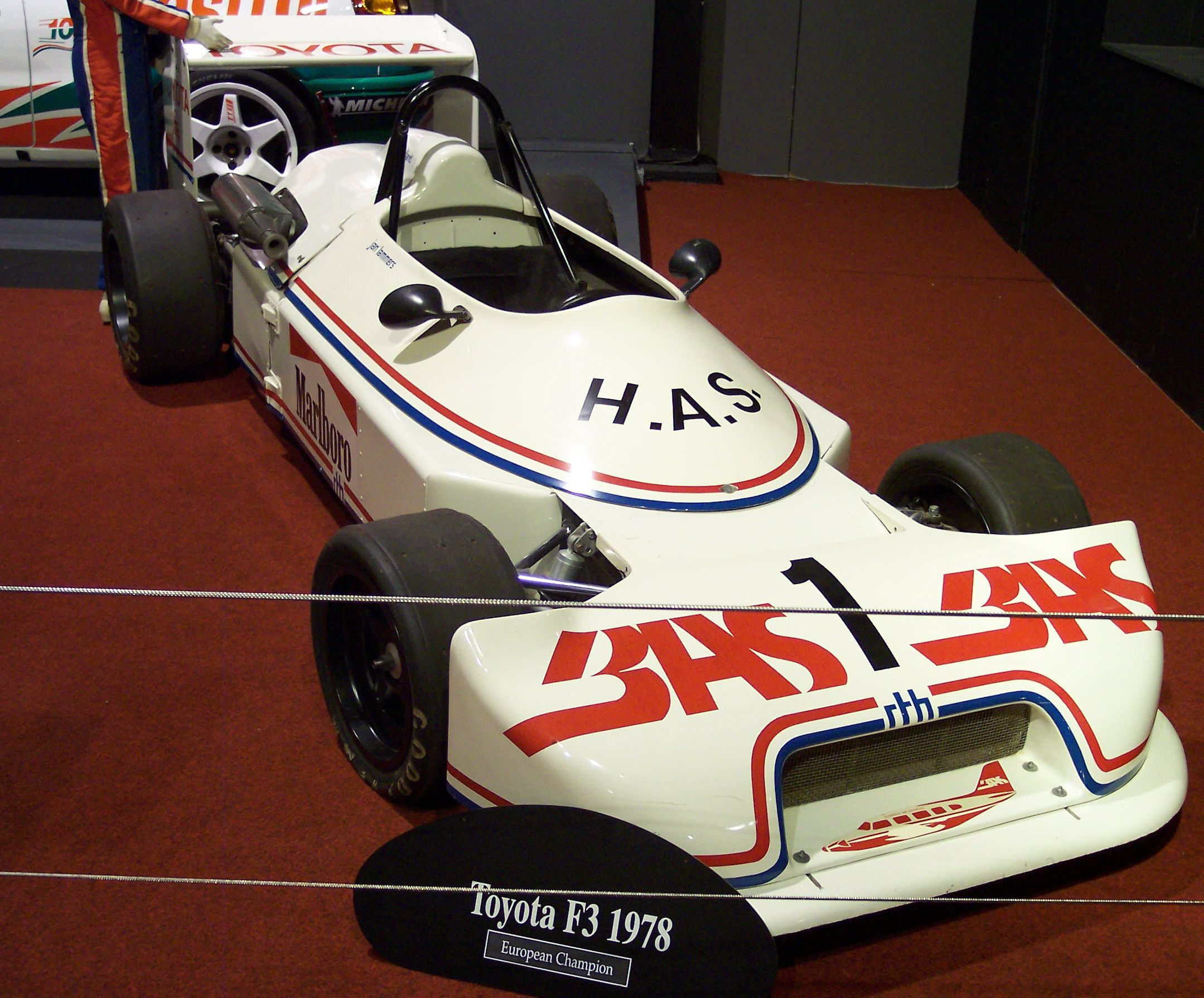
1978 Toyota-powered Ralt RT1 Formula 3 chassis

The first chassis produced by Ralt was the RT1, a simple and versatile car used in Formula 2, Formula 3, and Formula Atlantic between 1975 and 1978. In 1975, it won its first success: the Formula 3 European Cup, at the hands of Australian racing driver Larry Perkins.

In 1976, it won in Formula 2 at the hands of the German-Swedish driver Freddy Kottulinsky at the Nurburgring. She also won the German Formula 3 championship at the hands of Bertram Schäfer.

In 1977, it won, with Elio De Angelis, the Italian Formula 3 championship and that of Sweden.

In 1978, it won, with Derek Warwick and Nelson Piquet, the two British Formula 3 championships as well as, with Bertram Schäfer, the German, Swedish and European championships in the discipline.

Other championships were won by Ralt drivers in 1979 and 1980, in Formula 3, Formula Atlantic, and Formula Super Vee. In Formula Atlantic, the RT1 managed to amass 15 different championships.

It was later converted into an enclosed-wheel sports prototype-style car with bodywork, and used in the revived Can-Am series, where it only managed 1 win, at Mid-Ohio in 1979, and achieved 4 class wins and 2 podium finishes in the series.
