= Ilmor =

British engineering company

Ilmor Engineering Limited
- Type: Private Limited Company
- Founded: 1983
- Founder: Mario Illien and Paul Morgan
- Headquarters: Brixworth, Northamptonshire, United Kingdom
- Website: www.ilmor.co.uk

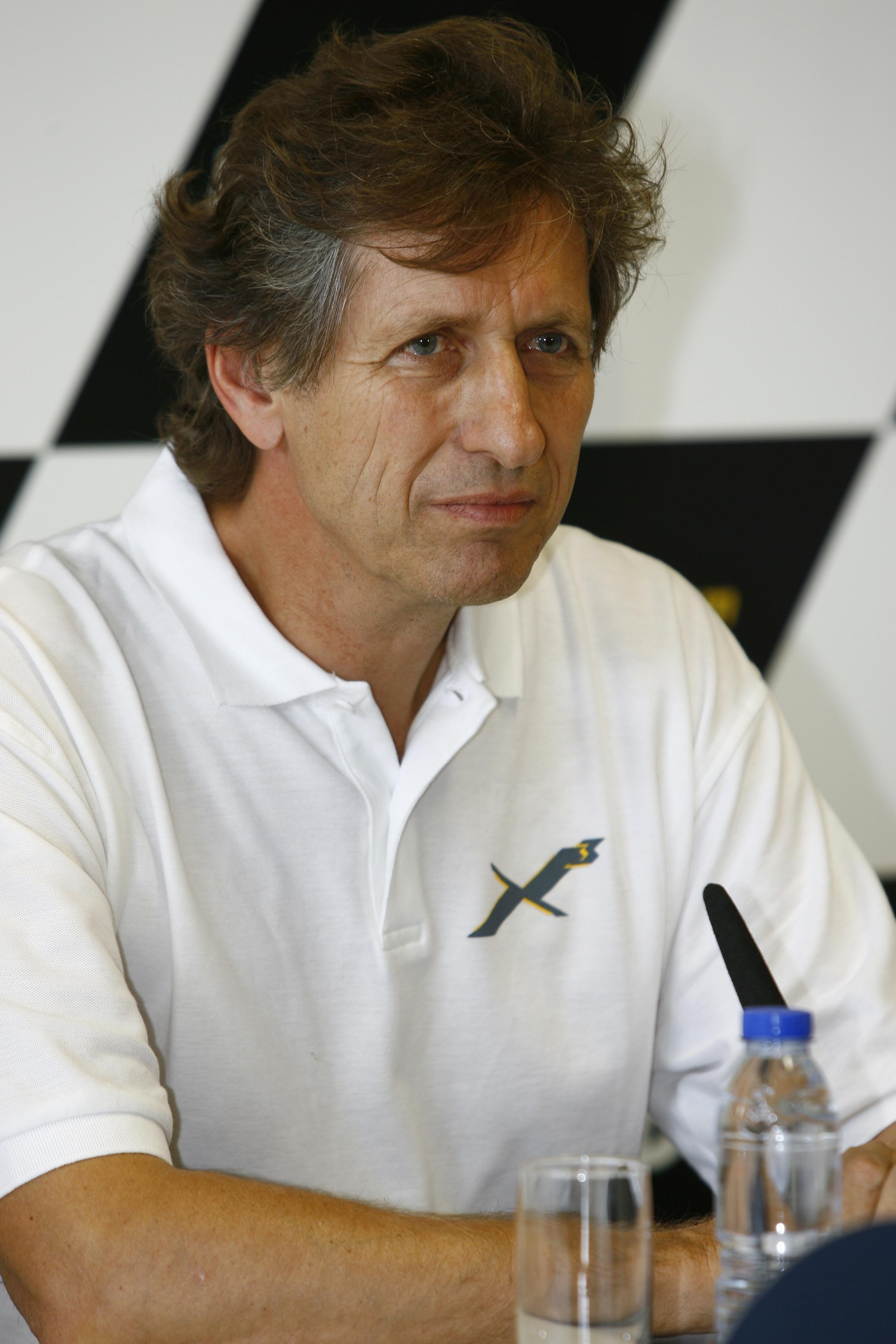
Mario Illien, co-founder of Ilmor

Ilmor is a British independent high-performance motor racing engineering company. It was founded by Mario Illien and Paul Morgan in November 1983. With manufacturing based in Brixworth, Northamptonshire, and maintenance offices in Plymouth, Michigan, the company supplies engines and consultancy to the IndyCar Series, NASCAR Craftsman Truck Series, ARCA Menards Series, and MotoGP.

Ilmor Engineering originally designed built and produced IndyCar engines for Chevrolet. In the 1990s, the company built a partnership with Mercedes-Benz to power F1 cars for both the Sauber and McLaren teams. After the death of Paul Morgan in a vintage aeroplane crash in 2001, Mercedes increased its stake until it owned the entire company, and renamed it Mercedes-Benz High Performance Engines Ltd. In 2005, Mario Illien concluded a deal to purchase the Special Projects part of the company in partnership with Roger Penske, which worked in partnership with Honda Performance Development for IndyCar engines between 2003 and 2011. This new company, which is independent of Mercedes, is once again known as Ilmor Engineering Ltd. They developed the Ilmor X3 for the 2007 MotoGP World Motorcycle Championship, entering one race before withdrawing and effectively shutting down the race team, due to funding problems.

Racing remains the core part of the business today and Ilmor acts as a consultant for motorsport clients from all forms of racing. However, the business is now using its racing expertise to diversify into other areas such as OEM automotive, defence, marine and energy efficient engine applications.

== 2.65 litre Indy car V-8 ==
Ilmor 265-A

Overview
- Manufacturer: (United Kingdom) / (United States) Ilmor-Chevrolet
- Production: 1984–1993

Layout
- Configuration: 90° V8
- Displacement: 2.65 L (162 cu in)
- Cylinder bore: 3.465 in (88.0 mm)
- Piston stroke: 2.142 in (54.4 mm)
- Valvetrain: 32-valve, DOHC, four-valves per cylinder
- Compression ratio: 11:1

Combustion
- Fuel system: Mechanical multi-point fuel injection
- Fuel type: Gasoline
- Oil system: Dry sump

Output
- Power output: 720–850 hp (537–634 kW)
- Torque output: 350–415 lb⋅ft (475–563 N⋅m)

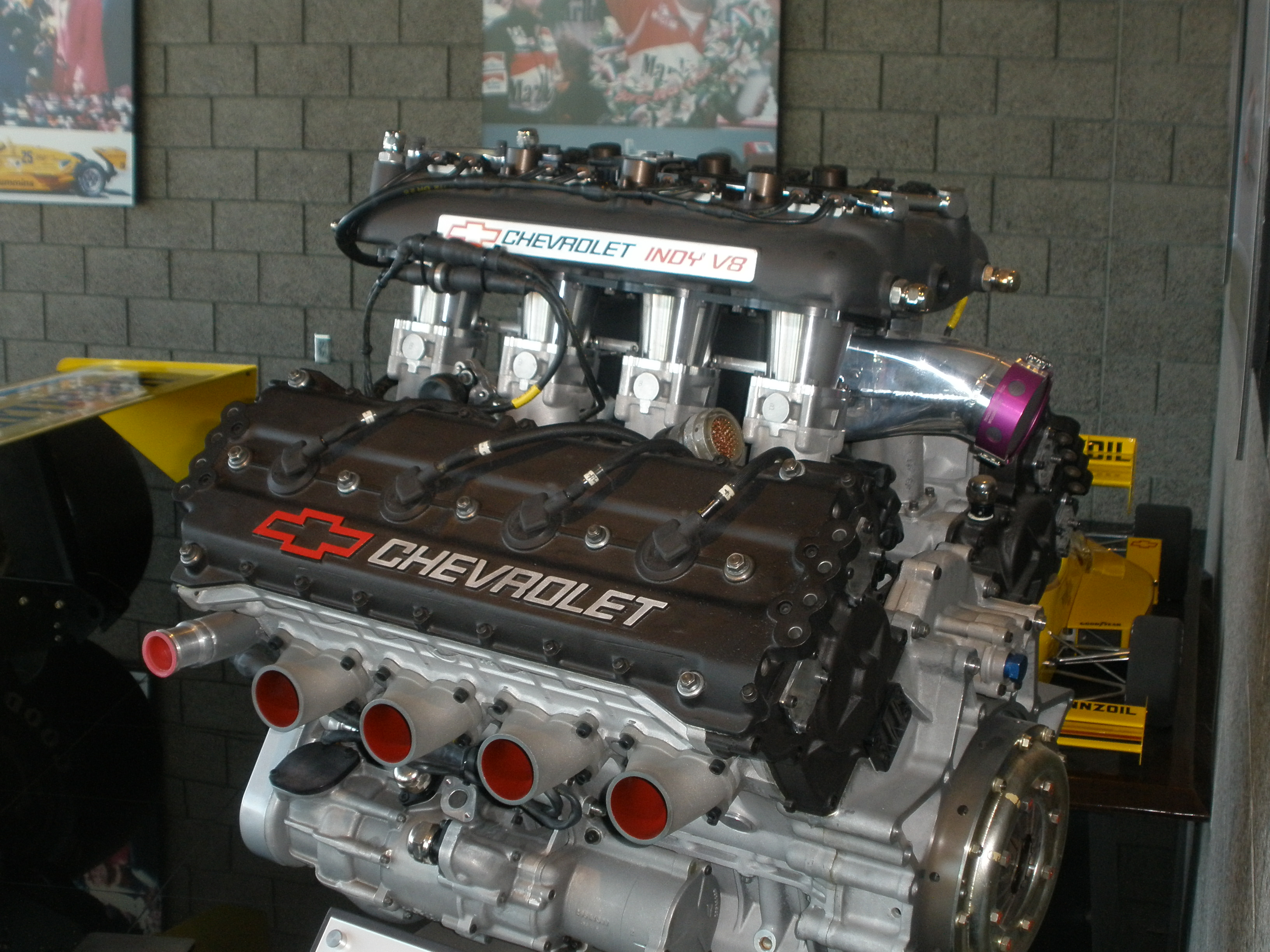
The "Chevy" Indy V-8

Both engineers were working at Cosworth on the Cosworth DFX turbocharged methanol engine for the CART Indy Car World Series; differences of opinion over the future development direction led them to break away from their parent company to pursue their own ideas. There was some acrimony in their split from Cosworth, their former employer claiming that the Ilmor engine was little different from their planned modifications to the DFX.

Founded as an independent British engine manufacturer in 1983, it started building engines for Indy cars with the money of team owner and chassis manufacturer Roger Penske. The Ilmor 265-A, badged initially as the Ilmor-Chevrolet Indy V-8, debuted at the 1986 Indianapolis 500 with Team Penske driver Al Unser. In 1987, the engine program expanded to all three Penske team drivers (Rick Mears, Danny Sullivan, and Al Unser), Patrick Racing, and Newman/Haas Racing. Mario Andretti, driving for Newman/Haas, won at Long Beach, the engine's first Indy car victory. He also won the pole position for the 1987 Indianapolis 500. Rick Mears earned the first victory for the engine in a 500 mile race at the 1987 Pocono 500. A year later, now badged as the Chevrolet Indy V-8, Mears won the 1988 Indianapolis 500, the engine's first win at Indianapolis. The engine went on to have a record in CART of winning 64 of 78 races from 1987 to 1991.

In 1992, the 265-A engine was followed up by the 265-B engine. The "Chevy-B" was fielded singly by Penske Racing (Rick Mears and Emerson Fittipaldi) in 1992 and won four CART series races. All other Ilmor teams remained with the "Chevy-A" for 1992. Bobby Rahal, driving a "Chevy-A" won the 1992 CART championship, the fifth consecutive (and final) for the 265-A. Al Unser Jr. won the 1992 Indianapolis 500 driving a "Chevy-A", also the fifth consecutive (and final) Indy 500 win for the 265-A. Emerson Fittipaldi drove a "Chevy-B" to 4th place in points.

For the 1993 season, the 265-C engine was introduced, intended to replace both the 265-A and the 265-B. Chevrolet dropped its badging support after the 1993 season.

For the 1994 season, two new engines were introduced. The 265-D engine replaced the 265-C. Without badging support, the engines were referred to simply as the "Ilmor-C" and the "Ilmor-D".

For 1995, Mercedes-Benz became the badging manufacturer for the Ilmor Indy car engines. In 1996, the open wheel "split" began between CART and the IRL. Ilmor primarily was a provider for CART-based teams, and did not provide engines for any full-time IRL teams. At the 1996 Indy 500, the "Ilmor Mercedes-Benz D" was used by Galles Racing, and finished second, the powerplant's one and only start in an IRL-sanctioned race. When the IRL switched to normally-aspirated engines for 1997, the 265s were no longer permitted in the IRL and the Indy 500, and from that point on raced in the CART series exclusively.

== F1 debut ==
In 1991 Ilmor entered Formula 1 with a V10 engine as exclusive supplier to the Leyton House team (formerly March). Ilmor also supplied engines to the Tyrrell team, starting from 1992. Powered by the Ilmor V10, Tyrrell scored eight points through Andrea de Cesaris and March another three through Karl Wendlinger.

== Sauber ==
The Sauber sportscar team and Mercedes-Benz signed a deal with Ilmor after scrapping plans for a Mercedes engine. After scoring 12 points in 1993, Mercedes entered officially in 1994 using an updated version of the 1993 engine. The same year Mercedes-Benz acquired Chevrolet's 25% share of Ilmor.

== Racing in the United States ==
The 265D V8s ran the entire 1994 Indy Car season badged as "Ilmor Indy V8", with Team Penske headlining the program.

In 1994, Ilmor produced the Mercedes-Benz 500I engine for Team Penske. The 500I exploited a loophole in the engine rules at the Indianapolis 500, which was run under slightly different rules than other CART races. Originally stock-block engines based on production units, fitted with two pushrod and rocker arm actuated valves per cylinder, were permitted to run at increased cubic capacity (3.43 litres vs 2.65 litres) and significantly greater turbo boost than the pure racing engines. For several years Buick V6 units had been extremely fast but fragile; the restrictions were relaxed with the intent of permitting Buick-like engines to use stronger but still production-like blocks – the Menard engine based on the Buick took this approach.

Ilmor produced a new racing engine retaining pushrods designed specifically for the requirements of the Indianapolis 500, producing a V8 engine which was approximately 200 bhp (150 kW) more powerful than the Cosworth XB and Ilmor 265D opposition. Team Penske's cars were the fastest at the 1994 Indianapolis 500. Al Unser Jr. won the race, with Emerson Fittipaldi also figuring strongly until an accident on lap 184. The loophole was closed for 1995.

For 1995 the 265D V8s were rebadged Mercedes. Al Unser Jr. finished runner-up with four wins. Rahal-Hogan Racing joined Penske as major teams. After the CART-IRL split, Mercedes left CART after the 2000 season.

Ilmor continued working in the United States on the Oldsmobile Aurora later Chevrolet V8 for the IRL Penske entries.

In 2003 Honda partnered with Ilmor on the Honda Indy V8 engine between 2003 and 2011 for co-assembling, preparation, tune-up and maintenance. At the conclusion of the 2011 season, Honda discontinued their partnership with Ilmor subsequently moving all design, development and production in house without any third-party tune-up partnership to HPD, for the 2012 Honda Indy V6.

In 2012 Chevrolet returned to the IndyCar Series, partnering with Ilmor on the Chevrolet Indy V6 engine program in supplying free engines for Team Penske, with the rest of Chevrolet-powered IndyCar Series teams paying lease system.

Ilmor is the option specification engine supplier of engines for the ARCA Menards Series and NASCAR Camping World Truck Series. Truck Series teams are allowed to use the option crate engine based on the LSX, and many teams have switched to the option engine. Ilmor was criticized when four of its NT1 engines failed during the 2019 World of Westgate 200 at Las Vegas Motor Speedway. The manufacturer took responsibility for the engines that suffered from severe detonation due to the combination of the high engine load condition combined with the extreme weather conditions in Las Vegas. Despite Ilmor's announcement, NASCAR denied ThorSport's request to reinstate Enfinger and Sauter into the playoffs.

In 2021, Ilmor partnered with Edelbrock to supply a 396 cubic inch engine, which Ilmor primarily supplies in ARCA, for the Superstar Racing Experience.

== Mercedes-Benz in Formula One ==
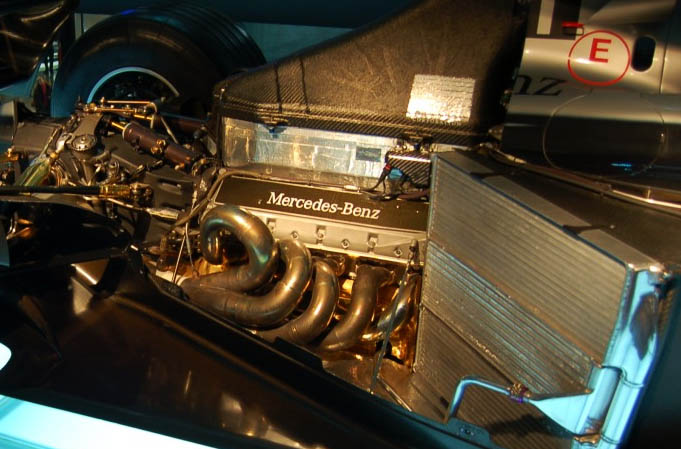
A 2000 McLaren MP4-15's Mercedes-Benz FO110J 3.0 litre V10 engine, made by Ilmor

Ilmor built the Mercedes-Benz engines for McLaren after Ilmor repositioned its Formula One involvement from independent engine manufacturer to engine builder and assembler to Mercedes-Benz High Performance Engines (akin to Mecachrome with Renault and Cosworth with Ford schemes).

The Ilmor engines went on to be successful with McLaren, scoring several podiums in both 1995 and 1996, leading to three wins in 1997 and back to back drivers championship in 1998 and 1999, as well as the constructor's championship in 1998.

In 2001 Paul Morgan was killed while landing one of his vintage airplanes, a Hawker Sea Fury at Sywell Aerodrome, Northamptonshire. In 2002 DaimlerChrysler increased its share to 55% and renamed the company Mercedes-Ilmor. In 2005 DaimlerChrysler became the sole owner of Ilmor and renamed the company Mercedes-Benz High Performance Engines Ltd.

== Ilmor Engineering, Inc. – expansion to the U.S. ==
Ilmor Engineering, Inc., a sister company to Ilmor U.K., was incorporated in 1990 with the primary goal of providing engineering support to customers using the Ilmor Ltd.-manufactured Chevrolet 265A Indy Car engine.

Ilmor, Inc.'s capabilities have grown to encompass design and analysis tools, engine and sub-systems test capabilities – including emissions compliance, manufacturing, electronics and wiring design and manufacture, and facilities for service and support, including auto racing, boat racing, high-performance road cars, high performance offshore powerboats and custom V-twin motorcycles.

== Diversification – Ilmor High Performance Marine, LLC. ==
Ilmor, Inc. entered the high-performance marine world in 2002, building race engines for the SuperCat Offshore Racing Series of the American Power Boat Association (APBA), using modified Dodge Viper's V10 engines.

Ilmor's high-performance marine division has grown in the U.S. and European boat market.

Emissions requirements established in 2009 by the California Air Resources Board, the federal Environmental Protection Agency and the European Union required all high-performance marine engines had to meet more stringent exhaust emissions standards. The MV10-650 and the MV10-725 were created to meet the new requirements.

== Powerboat Racing World Champions ==
Ilmor entered the MV10 engine into powerboat competition in 2007. In the first year of competition for the engines, a pair of Ilmor Marine MV10-625 engines powered the #99 Fountain Worldwide "King of Shaves" powerboat to the 2007 Powerboat P1 Evolution Class World Championship. Two additional European based Powerboat P1 World Championships were obtained in 2008 and 2009 and World Championship success in the US in 2008.

== MotoGP ==
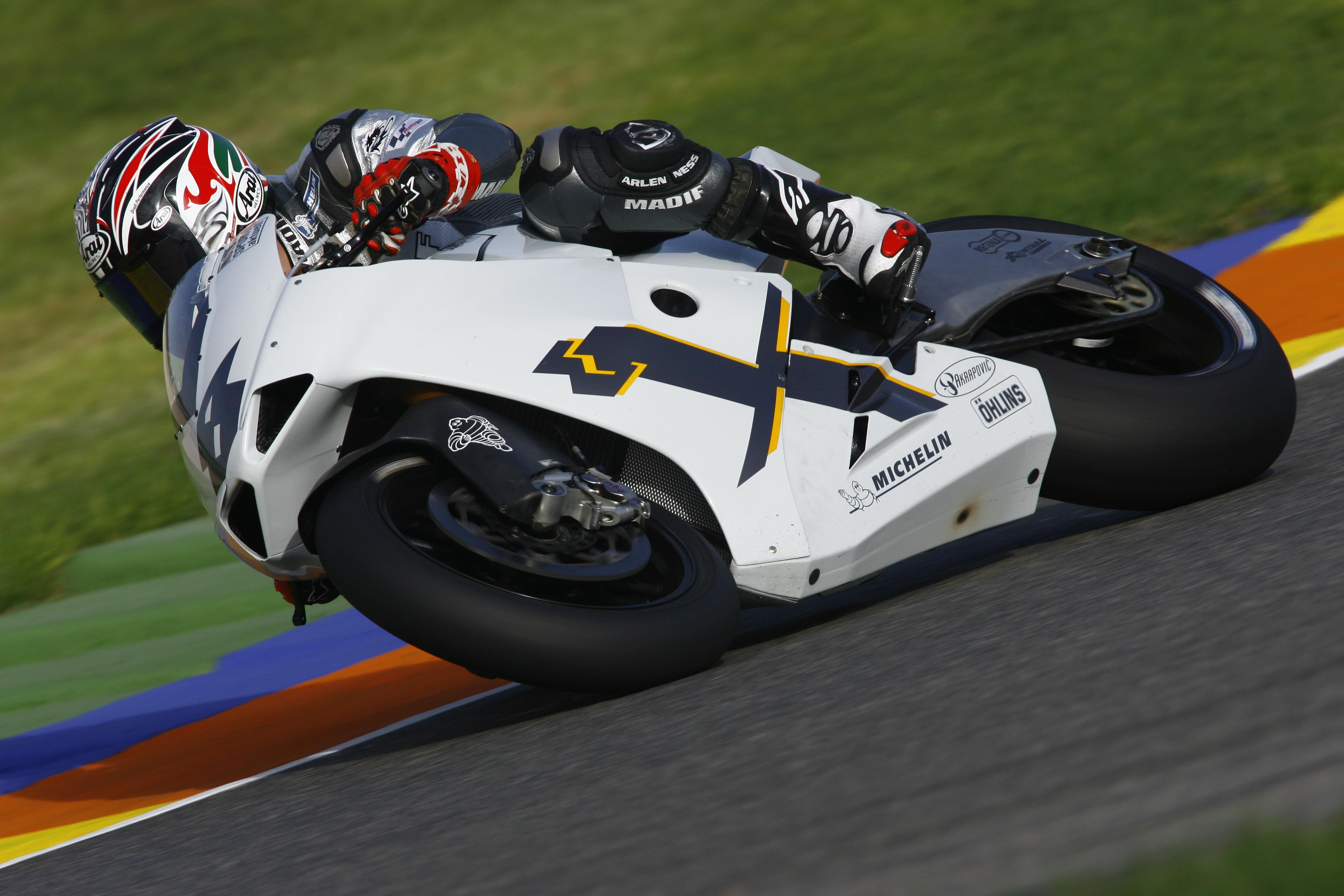
Ilmor X3

In 2006, Ilmor announced that they would enter a two-bike team in the MotoGP motorcycle racing series and would enter a single rider team as a wildcard entry in the final two races of the 2006 season. For the 2007 MotoGP season, engine capacity was to be reduced to 800cc from 990cc so Ilmor's wildcard entries in 2006 would be the first appearance of an 800cc MotoGP motorcycle at a race meeting.

Former 500 cc race winner Garry McCoy was confirmed as the rider for the Michelin-shod bike in its 2006 appearances, scoring points both in the 2006 Portuguese Grand Prix at the Autódromo do Estoril and the 2006 Gran Premio de la Comunitat Valenciana, becoming the first rider to score points on an 800cc MotoGP machine, though McCoy finished last on both occasions, four and seven laps down respectively.

On 18 December 2006, Ilmor Engineering confirmed via their website that Jeremy McWilliams and Andrew Pitt had been selected as riders for the 2007 season. On 15 March 2007 after one race, the team announced that they were taking a break from Moto GP as a result of funding issues.

== Complete Formula One results ==
(key)

Year	Entrant	Chassis	Engine	Tyres	Drivers	1	2	3	4	5	6	7	8	9	10	11	12	13	14	15	16	Points	WCC
1991	Leyton House Racing	Leyton House CG911	Ilmor 2175A 3.5 V10	G		USA	BRA	SMR	MON	CAN	MEX	FRA	GBR	GER	HUN	BEL	ITA	POR	ESP	JPN	AUS	1	12th
1991	Leyton House Racing	Leyton House CG911	Ilmor 2175A 3.5 V10	G	(Brazil) Maurício Gugelmin	Ret	Ret	12	Ret	Ret	Ret	7	Ret	Ret	11	Ret	15	7	7	8	14	1	12th
1991	Leyton House Racing	Leyton House CG911	Ilmor 2175A 3.5 V10	G	(Italy) Ivan Capelli	Ret	Ret	Ret	Ret	Ret	Ret	Ret	Ret	Ret	6	Ret	8	17	Ret			1	12th
1991	Leyton House Racing	Leyton House CG911	Ilmor 2175A 3.5 V10	G	(Austria) Karl Wendlinger															Ret	20	1	12th
1992	March F1	March CG911	Ilmor 2175A 3.5 V10	G		RSA	MEX	BRA	ESP	SMR	MON	CAN	FRA	GBR	GER	HUN	BEL	ITA	POR	JPN	AUS	3	9th
1992	March F1	March CG911	Ilmor 2175A 3.5 V10	G	(France) Paul Belmondo	DNQ	DNQ	DNQ	12	13	DNQ	14	DNQ	DNQ	13	9						3	9th
1992	March F1	March CG911	Ilmor 2175A 3.5 V10	G	(Italy) Emanuele Naspetti												12	Ret	11	13	Ret	3	9th
1992	March F1	March CG911	Ilmor 2175A 3.5 V10	G	(Austria) Karl Wendlinger	Ret	Ret	Ret	8	12	Ret	4	Ret	Ret	16	Ret	11	10	Ret			3	9th
1992	March F1	March CG911	Ilmor 2175A 3.5 V10	G	(Netherlands) Jan Lammers															Ret	12	3	9th
1992	Tyrrell Racing Organisation	Tyrrell 020B	Ilmor 2175A 3.5 V10	G	(France) Olivier Grouillard	Ret	Ret	Ret	Ret	8	Ret	12	11	11	Ret	Ret	Ret	Ret	Ret	Ret	Ret	8	6th
1992	Tyrrell Racing Organisation	Tyrrell 020B	Ilmor 2175A 3.5 V10	G	(Italy) Andrea de Cesaris	Ret	5	Ret	Ret	14	Ret	5	Ret	Ret	Ret	8	8	6	9	4	Ret	8	6th
1993	Team Sauber Formula 1	Sauber C12	Sauber (Ilmor) 2175A 3.5 V10	G		RSA	BRA	EUR	SMR	ESP	MON	CAN	FRA	GBR	GER	HUN	BEL	ITA	POR	JPN	AUS	12	7th
1993	Team Sauber Formula 1	Sauber C12	Sauber (Ilmor) 2175A 3.5 V10	G	(Austria) Karl Wendlinger	Ret	Ret	Ret	Ret	Ret	13	6	Ret	Ret	9	6	Ret	4	5	Ret	15	12	7th
1993	Team Sauber Formula 1	Sauber C12	Sauber (Ilmor) 2175A 3.5 V10	G	(Finland) JJ Lehto	5	Ret	Ret	4	Ret	Ret	7	Ret	8	Ret	Ret	9	Ret	7	8	Ret	12	7th
1994	Broker Sauber Mercedes	Sauber C13	Mercedes (Ilmor) 2175B 3.5 V10	G		BRA	PAC	SMR	MON	ESP	CAN	FRA	GBR	GER	HUN	BEL	ITA	POR	EUR	JPN	AUS	12	8th
1994	Broker Sauber Mercedes	Sauber C13	Mercedes (Ilmor) 2175B 3.5 V10	G	(Austria) Karl Wendlinger	6	Ret	4	WD													12	8th
1994	Broker Sauber Mercedes	Sauber C13	Mercedes (Ilmor) 2175B 3.5 V10	G	(Italy) Andrea de Cesaris						Ret	6	Ret	Ret	Ret	Ret	Ret	Ret	Ret			12	8th
1994	Broker Sauber Mercedes	Sauber C13	Mercedes (Ilmor) 2175B 3.5 V10	G	(Finland) JJ Lehto															Ret	10	12	8th
1994	Broker Sauber Mercedes	Sauber C13	Mercedes (Ilmor) 2175B 3.5 V10	G	(Germany) Heinz-Harald Frentzen	Ret	5	7	WD	Ret	Ret	4	7	Ret	Ret	Ret	Ret	Ret	6	6	7	12	8th
1994	Pacific Grand Prix	Pacific PR01	Ilmor 2175A 3.5 V10	G	(France) Paul Belmondo	DNQ	DNQ	DNQ	Ret	Ret	DNQ	DNQ	DNQ	DNQ	DNQ	DNQ	DNQ	DNQ	DNQ	DNQ	DNQ	0	NC
1994	Pacific Grand Prix	Pacific PR01	Ilmor 2175A 3.5 V10	G	(France) Bertrand Gachot	Ret	DNQ	Ret	Ret	Ret	Ret	DNQ	DNQ	DNQ	DNQ	DNQ	DNQ	DNQ	DNQ	DNQ	DNQ	0	NC
For results after 1994, please see Mercedes-Benz Grand Prix results

== See also ==
- Mercedes-Benz Motorsport
- Mercedes-Ilmor
