= Mercedes AMG High Performance Powertrains =

British Formula One engine manufacturer

Coordinates: 52.335°N 0.897°W

Mercedes AMG High Performance Powertrains Ltd
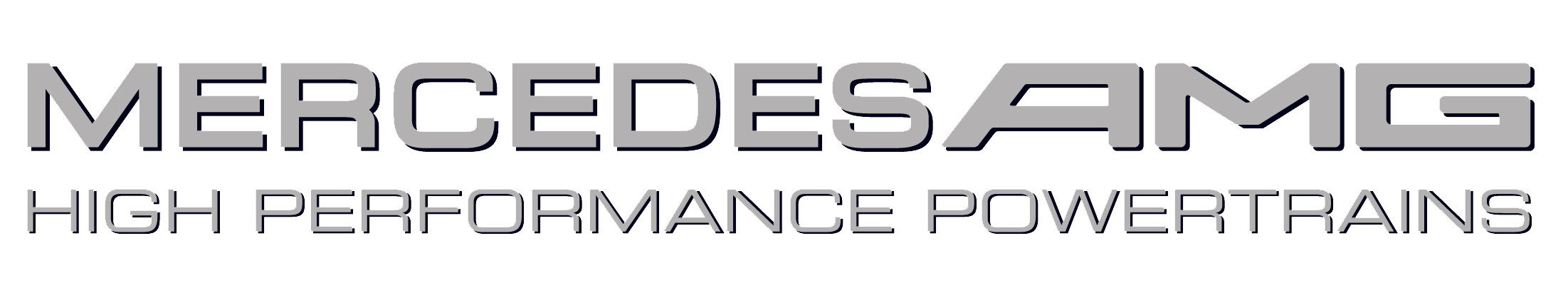
- Type: Subsidiary
- Founded: 11 October 1983; 43 years ago (as Ilmor)
- Founders: Mario Illien; Paul Morgan
- Headquarters: Brixworth, Northamptonshire, United Kingdom
- Area served: Worldwide
- Key people: Markus Schäfer (chairman); Hywel Thomas (managing director)
- Parent: Mercedes-Benz AG
- Website: mercedes-amg-hpp.com

Mercedes AMG High Performance Powertrains (HPP) (previously known as Ilmor Engineering and Mercedes-Benz High Performance Engines) is a Formula One engine manufacturer, owned by Mercedes-Benz.

The company supplied Sauber during the 1994 season, McLaren from 1995 to 2014 and from 2021, Force India from 2009 to 2018, Brawn in 2009, the Mercedes factory team since 2010, Atlassian Williams since 2014, Lotus in 2015, Manor Racing in 2016, Racing Point Force India in 2018, Racing Point from 2019 to 2020, Aston Martin from 2021 to 2025, and Alpine from 2026. Their engines have won thirteen Formula One Drivers' Championships (8 for the Mercedes factory team, 4 for McLaren, and 1 for Brawn) and thirteen Formula One Constructors' Championships (9 for the Mercedes factory team, 3 for McLaren, and 1 for Brawn). Beside those Formula One constructors, the company currently supplies road-legal engines for the Mercedes-AMG One sports car.

== Background ==
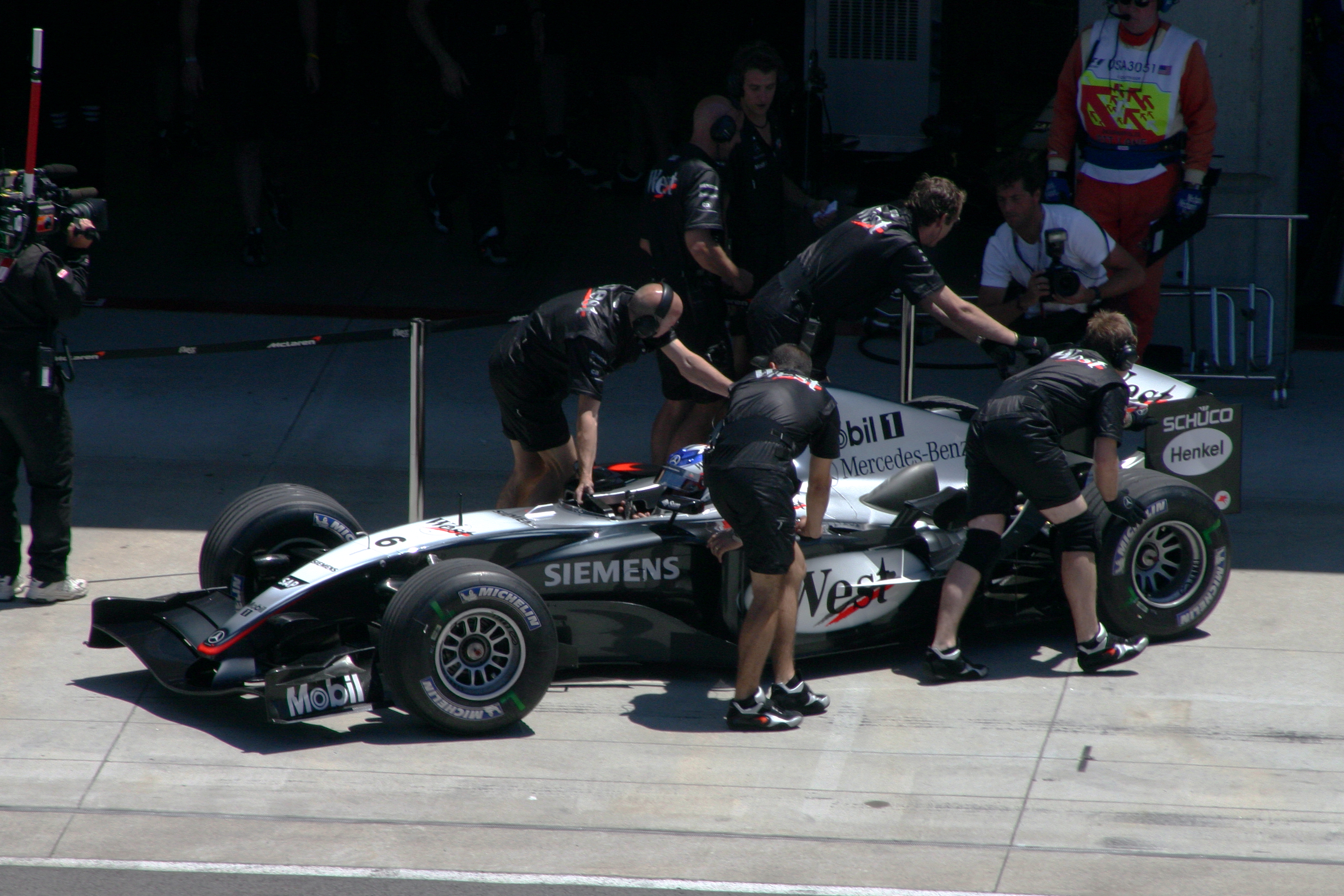
A 2004 McLaren powered by the Mercedes-Ilmor 3.0 litre V10

Ilmor was founded by Mario Illien and Paul Morgan in 1983, as an independent British Formula One engine manufacturer. The company name was taken from the surnames of the founders. It originally started building engines for IndyCars with the money of IndyCar team owner and chassis manufacturer Roger Penske.

Daimler-Benz (later known as Daimler) acquired General Motors' 25% share of Ilmor in 1993. In 2002, Daimler increased its share to 55% and renamed the company Mercedes-Ilmor. In 2005, it became the sole owner of Ilmor and renamed the company first to Mercedes-Benz High Performance Engines, then to Mercedes-Benz HighPerformanceEngines. In December 2011, the company was renamed to Mercedes AMG High Performance Powertrains along with the renaming of Mercedes GP to incorporate the Mercedes-AMG sub-brand.

At the same time, the small Special Projects part of the company, which between 2003 and 2011 had been contracted to co-develop, co-assembly, arrangement, preparation and tune up Honda's IndyCar Series engines, split away to become a separate company, owned by Mario Illien and Roger Penske. This new company, which is totally independent of Mercedes, is once again known as Ilmor Engineering Ltd.

== History ==
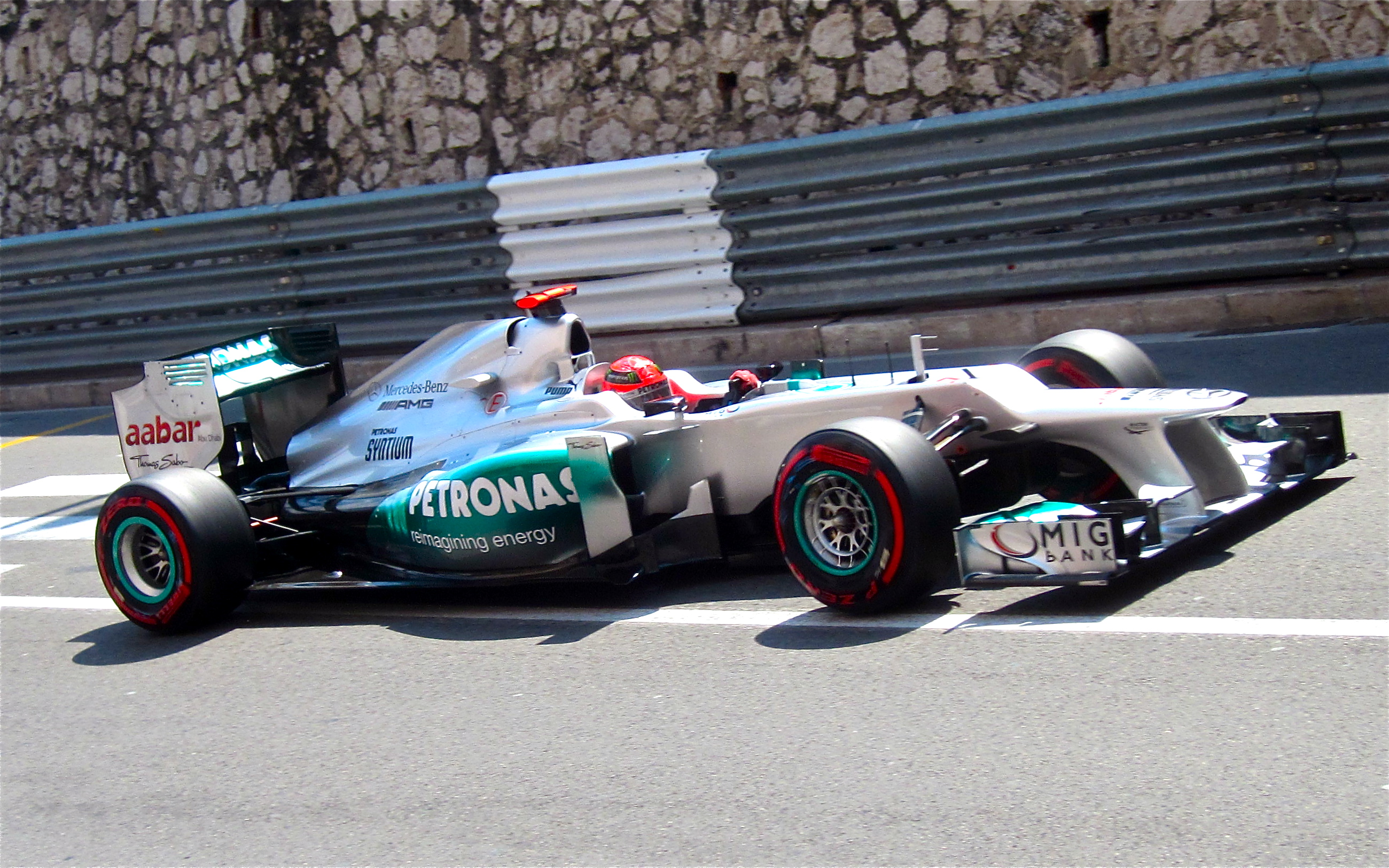
Mercedes-Benz from 2010 onwards has also competed as a constructor as well as an engine maker.

In 1991, Ilmor entered Formula One as the engine supplier to the Leyton House team (formerly March). In 1992, Leyton House changed its name back to March and continued using Ilmor engines. Ilmor also delivered engines to Tyrrell Racing in that year. Powered by an Ilmor V10, March scored 3 points, and Tyrrell 8 points.

Ilmor already had a good name in F1, and so the Sauber sportscar-team and Mercedes-Benz that were planning their Formula One entrance together signed a deal with Ilmor to produce racing engines for them. However, Mercedes stepped back from the project with the engines only carrying the slogan "Concept by Mercedes-Benz" and the engines were officially called "Saubers".

However, after an unexpectedly fast performance in 1993, Sauber convinced Mercedes to enter officially in 1994. In 1994, Ilmor also supplied the new Pacific GP team of Keith Wiggins with the old 1993 spec engines. Pacific only managed to qualify seven times in thirty-two attempts, although the engine was not implicated in this poor display.

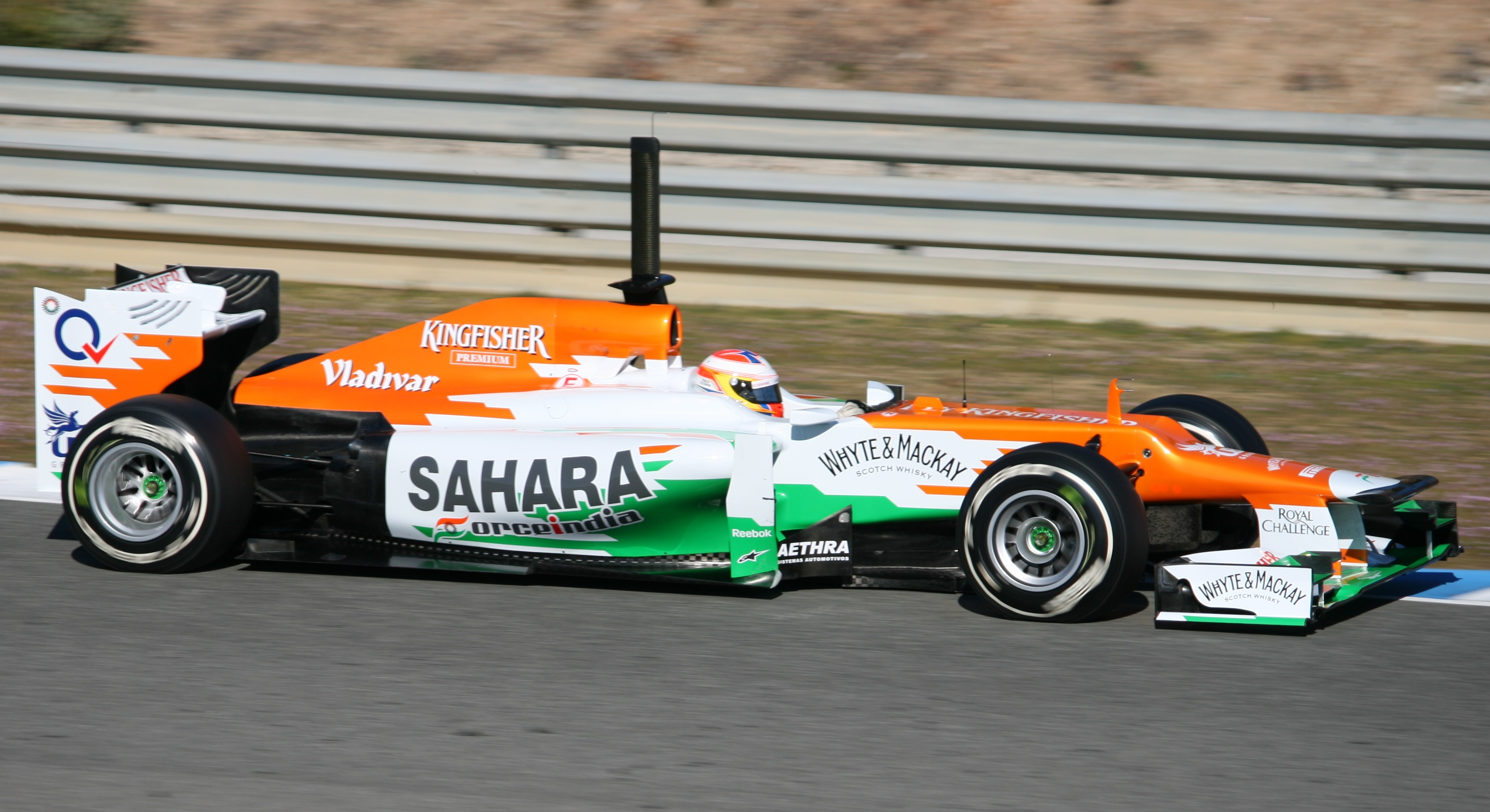
Force India was a Mercedes engine customer.

Ilmor became the Mercedes's trusted engine builder partner and assembler to McLaren in 1995 after Ilmor decided to reposition its Formula One involvement by ceasing its independent engine supply program. The partnership took its first win at the 1997 Australian Grand Prix. Mika Häkkinen picked up Drivers' Championships in 1998 and 1999, and the team won the Constructors' Championship in 1998. After a winless 2006 season, McLaren bounced back and won the Drivers' Championship in 2008 with Lewis Hamilton.

In 2001, Paul Morgan was killed whilst landing his vintage aeroplane at Sywell Aerodrome, Northamptonshire. This led to Mercedes-Benz increasing their financial involvement in Ilmor, with the company being renamed Mercedes-Ilmor Ltd.

The new Formula One regulations in 2014 saw Mercedes produce a hybrid 1.6-litre turbocharged V6 engine, which featured both a kinetic energy recovery system (MGU-K) and a heat energy recovery system (MGU-H). The Mercedes engine started the season with a clear advantage, with Mercedes-engined cars scoring the majority of the points. For 2026, the regulations were changed to remove the MGU-H and increase the power of the MGU-K. Since 2014, Mercedes-powered cars have achieved pole position in 165 out of 272 races as of the 2026 São Paulo Grand Prix, and have won 155 races during this period.

In March 2020, in light of the delayed seasons due to the COVID-19 pandemic, and working with UCL Mechanical Engineering and Institute of Healthcare Engineering, Mercedes HPP announced that they would be making breathing aids to help keep patients out of intensive care. Mercedes HPP created a device within a week. On the first day of production, Mercedes HPP manufactured 600 Continuous Positive Airway Pressure devices, with plans to increase this to 1,000 devices per day. These devices were being produced on machines that typically manufactured pistons and turbochargers for Formula 1 engines. Mercedes would go on to win the Drivers' and Constructors' championships in 2020.

Mercedes supplied the engines that powered McLaren to Constructors’ Championship titles in 2024 and 2025; in 2025 a Mercedes powered McLaren driven by Lando Norris claimed the Drivers’ Championship.

== Formula One engine results ==
Constructor	Season(s)	Total wins	WCC	WDC	First win	Last win
(Switzerland) Sauber	1994	0			–	–
(United Kingdom) McLaren	1995–2014, 2021–2026	102	3 (1998, 2024‍–‍2025)	4 (1998‍–‍1999, 2008, 2025)	1997 Australian Grand Prix	2026 São Paulo Grand Prix
(United Kingdom) Brawn	2009	8	1 (2009)	1 (2009)	2009 Australian Grand Prix	2009 Italian Grand Prix
Force India	2009–2018	0			–	–
(Germany) Mercedes (Note: Table does not include results of the Mercedes engines which competed in 1954–1955 as these were not made by Mercedes AMG High Performance Powertrains.)	2010–2026	134	9 (2014–2021, 2026)	8 (2014–2020, 2026)	2012 Chinese Grand Prix	2026 United States Grand Prix
(United Kingdom) Williams	2014–2026	0			–	–
(United Kingdom) Lotus	2015	0			–	–
(United Kingdom) MRT	2016	0			–	–
(United Kingdom) Racing Point Force India	2018	0			–	–
(United Kingdom) Racing Point	2019–2020	1			2020 Sakhir Grand Prix	2020 Sakhir Grand Prix
(United Kingdom) Aston Martin	2021–2025	0			–	–
(France) Alpine	2026	0			–	–
Total	1994–2026	245	13	13	1997 Australian Grand Prix	2026 São Paulo Grand Prix

== List of Formula One engines and power units ==
Season	Name	Format	Approximate peak power @ rpm Including hybrid system where applicable	Notes
1994	Mercedes-Benz 2175B	3.496 L V10	537–563 kW (720–755 hp) @ 14,000 rpm	Built by Ilmor
1995	Mercedes-Benz FO 110	2.997 L 75° V10	510 kW (690 hp) @ 15,600 rpm	Built by Ilmor
1996	Mercedes-Benz FO 110D	2.997 L 75° V10	540 kW (720 hp) @ 15,700 rpm	Built by Ilmor
1997	Mercedes-Benz FO 110E	2.997 L 75° V10	550–570 kW (740–760 hp) @ 15,800 rpm	Built by Ilmor
1998	Mercedes-Benz FO 110G	2.998 L 72° V10	600 kW (800 hp) @ 16,100 rpm	Built by Ilmor
1999	Mercedes-Benz FO 110H	2.998 L 72° V10	600 kW (810 hp) @ 16,200 rpm	Built by Ilmor
2000	Mercedes-Benz FO 110J	2.998 L 72° V10	608 kW (815 hp) @ 17,800 rpm	Built by Ilmor
2001	Mercedes-Benz FO 110K	2.998 L 72° V10	620 kW (830 hp) @ 17,800 rpm	Built by Ilmor
2002	Mercedes-Benz FO 110M	2.998 L 90° V10	630 kW (845 hp) @ 18,300 rpm	Built by Ilmor
2003	Mercedes-Benz FO 110P	2.998 L 90° V10	630 kW (850 hp) @ 18,500 rpm	Built by Ilmor
2004	Mercedes-Benz FO 110Q	2.998 L 90° V10	650 kW (870 hp) @ 18,500 rpm	Built by Ilmor
2005	Mercedes-Benz FO 110R	2.998 L 90° V10	690 kW (930 hp) @ 19,000 rpm	
2006	Mercedes-Benz FO 108S	2.398 L 90° V8	560 kW (750 hp) @ 19,000 rpm	
2007	Mercedes-Benz FO 108T	2.398 L 90° V8	600 kW (810 hp) @ 19,000 rpm	
2008	Mercedes-Benz FO 108V	2.398 L 90° V8	560–600 kW (750–800 hp) @ 19,000 rpm	
2009	Mercedes-Benz FO 108W	2.398 L 90° V8	560 kW (750 hp) + KERS @ 18,000 rpm	
2010	Mercedes-Benz FO 108X	2.398 L 90° V8	560 kW (750 hp) @ 18,000 rpm	
2011	Mercedes-Benz FO 108Y	2.398 L 90° V8	560 kW (750 hp) + KERS @ 18,000 rpm	
2012	Mercedes-Benz FO 108Z	2.398 L 90° V8	560 kW (750 hp) + KERS @ 18,000 rpm	
2013	Mercedes-Benz FO 108F	2.398 L 90° V8	560 kW (750 hp) + KERS @ 18,000 rpm	
2014	Mercedes-Benz PU106A	1.600 L 90° V6 turbo hybrid	630 kW (840 hp) @ 15,000 rpm	
2015	Mercedes-Benz PU106B	1.600 L 90° V6 turbo hybrid	649 kW (870 hp) @ 15,000 rpm	Adapted for use in the Mercedes-AMG ONE
2016	Mercedes-Benz PU106C	1.600 L 90° V6 turbo hybrid	670 kW (900 hp) @ 15,000 rpm	
2017	Mercedes-AMG M08 EQ Power+	1.600 L 90° V6 turbo hybrid	708 kW (949 hp) @ 15,000 rpm	
2018	Mercedes-AMG M09 EQ Power+	1.600 L 90° V6 turbo hybrid	750 kW (1,000 hp) @ 15,000 rpm	
2019	Mercedes-AMG M10 EQ Power+	1.600 L 90° V6 turbo hybrid	750 kW (1,000 hp) @ 15,000 rpm	Badged as "BWT Mercedes" for Racing Point
2020	Mercedes-AMG M11 EQ Performance	1.600 L 90° V6 turbo hybrid	764 kW (1,025 hp) @ 15,000 rpm	Badged as "BWT Mercedes" for Racing Point
2021	Mercedes-AMG M12 E Performance	1.600 L 90° V6 turbo hybrid	780 kW (1,050 hp) @ 15,000 rpm	
2022	Mercedes-AMG M13 E Performance	1.600 L 90° V6 turbo hybrid	800 kW (1,070 hp) @ 15,000 rpm	
2023	Mercedes-AMG M14 E Performance	1.600 L 90° V6 turbo hybrid	810 kW (1,080 hp) @ 15,000 rpm	
2024	Mercedes-AMG M15 E Performance	1.600 L 90° V6 turbo hybrid	810 kW (1,080 hp) @ 15,000 rpm	
2025	Mercedes-AMG M16 E Performance	1.600 L 90° V6 turbo hybrid	810 kW (1,080 hp) @ 15,000 rpm	
2026	Mercedes-AMG M17 E Performance	1.600 L 90° V6 turbo hybrid		

== See also ==
- Mercedes-Benz in motorsport
