= Paul Morgan (engineer) =

British automotive engineer (1948–2001)

Paul Jonathan Morgan
- Born: 29 July 1948
- Died: 12 May 2001 (aged 52); Sywell, Northamptonshire, UK
- Occupation: engineer
- Known for: co-founder of Ilmor Engineering

Paul Jonathan Morgan (29 July 1948 – 12 May 2001) was a British engineer who co-founded Ilmor Engineering with Mario Illien in 1983. Ilmor had major successes providing engines for motorsport and won three Queen's Awards for Export Achievement. He was killed in a plane crash at Sywell, Northamptonshire on 12 May 2001.

Morgan was an engineer at Cosworth from 1970 to 1983. In 1983 he left Cosworth to form Ilmor with fellow engineer Mario Illien. Ilmor was set up with backing from Roger Penske and achieved its first race win powering Mario Andretti's Lola at the Long Beach Grand Prix. In 1989, Morgan and Illien decided to enter Formula One.

Paul Morgan was killed instantly when his Hawker Sea Fury overturned on landing. David Coulthard won the Austrian Grand Prix the day after Morgan's death in a Mercedes-Ilmor powered McLaren. Coulthard opted not to participate in the traditional champagne celebration as a mark of respect.

Morgan's widow reduced her shareholding of Ilmor in 2002, selling 10% to DaimlerChrysler. In 2005, DaimlerChrysler acquired all the remaining shares from Mrs. Morgan, Mario Illien, and Roger Penske.
