= Mercedes engine customers' Grand Prix results =

The table below details the Grand Prix results of the other teams for which Mercedes was/is an engine supplier.

== Complete Formula One results ==
=== 1990s ===
(key)

| Year | Entrant | Chassis | Engine | Tyres | Drivers | 1 | 2 | 3 | 4 | 5 | 6 | 7 | 8 | 9 | 10 | 11 | 12 | 13 | 14 | 15 | 16 | 17 | Points | WCC |
|---|---|---|---|---|---|---|---|---|---|---|---|---|---|---|---|---|---|---|---|---|---|---|---|---|
| 1994 | Sauber Mercedes (Note: The team started the season as "Broker Sauber Mercedes" but then lost the title sponsor) | Sauber C13 | 2175B 3.5 V10 | G | | BRA | PAC | SMR | MON | ESP | CAN | FRA | GBR | GER | HUN | BEL | ITA | POR | EUR | JPN | AUS | | 12 | 8th |
| 1994 | Sauber Mercedes | Sauber C13 | 2175B 3.5 V10 | G | (Austria) Karl Wendlinger | 6 | Ret | 4 | DNS | | | | | | | | | | | | | | 12 | 8th |
| 1994 | Sauber Mercedes | Sauber C13 | 2175B 3.5 V10 | G | (Italy) Andrea de Cesaris | | | | | | Ret | 6 | Ret | Ret | Ret | Ret | Ret | Ret | Ret | | | | 12 | 8th |
| 1994 | Sauber Mercedes | Sauber C13 | 2175B 3.5 V10 | G | (Finland) JJ Lehto | | | | | | | | | | | | | | | Ret | 10 | | 12 | 8th |
| 1994 | Sauber Mercedes | Sauber C13 | 2175B 3.5 V10 | G | (Germany) Heinz-Harald Frentzen | Ret | 5 | 7 | DNS | Ret | Ret | 4 | 8 | Ret | Ret | Ret | Ret | Ret | 6 | 6 | 7 | | 12 | 8th |
| 1995 | Marlboro McLaren Mercedes | McLaren MP4/10; McLaren MP4/10B; McLaren MP4/10C | FO110 3.0 V10 | G | | BRA | ARG | SMR | ESP | MON | CAN | FRA | GBR | GER | HUN | BEL | ITA | POR | EUR | PAC | JPN | AUS | 30 | 4th |
| 1995 | Marlboro McLaren Mercedes | McLaren MP4/10; McLaren MP4/10B; McLaren MP4/10C | FO110 3.0 V10 | G | (United Kingdom) Mark Blundell | 6 | Ret | | | 5 | Ret | 11 | 5 | Ret | Ret | 5 | 4 | 9 | Ret | 9 | 7 | 4 | 30 | 4th |
| 1995 | Marlboro McLaren Mercedes | McLaren MP4/10; McLaren MP4/10B; McLaren MP4/10C | FO110 3.0 V10 | G | (United Kingdom) Nigel Mansell | | | 10 | Ret | | | | | | | | | | | | | | 30 | 4th |
| 1995 | Marlboro McLaren Mercedes | McLaren MP4/10; McLaren MP4/10B; McLaren MP4/10C | FO110 3.0 V10 | G | (Finland) Mika Häkkinen | 4 | Ret | 5 | Ret | Ret | Ret | 7 | Ret | Ret | Ret | Ret | 2 | Ret | 8 | | 2 | DNS | 30 | 4th |
| 1995 | Marlboro McLaren Mercedes | McLaren MP4/10; McLaren MP4/10B; McLaren MP4/10C | FO110 3.0 V10 | G | (Denmark) Jan Magnussen | | | | | | | | | | | | | | | 10 | | | 30 | 4th |
| 1996 | Marlboro McLaren Mercedes | McLaren MP4/11 | FO110/3 3.0 V10 | G | | AUS | BRA | ARG | EUR | SMR | MON | ESP | CAN | FRA | GBR | GER | HUN | BEL | ITA | POR | JPN | | 49 | 4th |
| 1996 | Marlboro McLaren Mercedes | McLaren MP4/11 | FO110/3 3.0 V10 | G | (Finland) Mika Häkkinen | 5 | 4 | Ret | 8 | 8 | 6 | 5 | 5 | 5 | 3 | Ret | 4 | 3 | 3 | Ret | 3 | | 49 | 4th |
| 1996 | Marlboro McLaren Mercedes | McLaren MP4/11 | FO110/3 3.0 V10 | G | (United Kingdom) David Coulthard | Ret | Ret | 7 | 3 | Ret | 2 | Ret | 4 | 6 | 5 | 5 | Ret | Ret | Ret | 13 | 8 | | 49 | 4th |
| 1997 | West McLaren Mercedes | McLaren MP4/12 | FO110E 3.0 V10; FO110F 3.0 V10 | G | | AUS | BRA | ARG | SMR | MON | ESP | CAN | FRA | GBR | GER | HUN | BEL | ITA | AUT | LUX | JPN | EUR | 63 | 4th |
| 1997 | West McLaren Mercedes | McLaren MP4/12 | FO110E 3.0 V10; FO110F 3.0 V10 | G | (Finland) Mika Häkkinen | 3 | 4 | 5 | 6 | Ret | 7 | Ret | Ret | Ret | 3 | Ret | DSQ | 9^{F} | Ret | Ret^{P} | 4 | 1 | 63 | 4th |
| 1997 | West McLaren Mercedes | McLaren MP4/12 | FO110E 3.0 V10; FO110F 3.0 V10 | G | (United Kingdom) David Coulthard | 1 | 10 | Ret | Ret | Ret | 6 | 7^{F} | 7 | 4 | Ret | Ret | Ret | 1 | 2 | Ret | 10 | 2 | 63 | 4th |
| 1998 | West McLaren Mercedes | McLaren MP4/13 | FO110G 3.0 V10 | B | | AUS | BRA | ARG | SMR | ESP | MON | CAN | FRA | GBR | AUT | GER | HUN | BEL | ITA | LUX | JPN | | 156 | 1st |
| 1998 | West McLaren Mercedes | McLaren MP4/13 | FO110G 3.0 V10 | B | (United Kingdom) David Coulthard | 2 | 2 | 6^{P} | 1^{P} | 2 | Ret | Ret^{P} | 6^{F} | Ret | 2^{F} | 2^{F} | 2 | 7 | Ret | 3 | 3 | | 156 | 1st |
| 1998 | West McLaren Mercedes | McLaren MP4/13 | FO110G 3.0 V10 | B | (Finland) Mika Häkkinen | 1^{P}^{F} | 1^{P}^{F} | 2 | Ret | 1^{P}^{F} | 1^{P}^{F} | Ret | 3^{P} | 2^{P} | 1 | 1^{P} | 6^{P} | Ret^{P} | 4^{F} | 1^{F} | 1^{P} | | 156 | 1st |
| 1999 | West McLaren Mercedes | McLaren MP4/14 | FO110H 3.0 V10 | B | | AUS | BRA | SMR | MON | ESP | CAN | FRA | GBR | AUT | GER | HUN | BEL | ITA | EUR | MAL | JPN | | 124 | 2nd |
| 1999 | West McLaren Mercedes | McLaren MP4/14 | FO110H 3.0 V10 | B | (Finland) Mika Häkkinen | Ret^{P} | 1^{P}^{F} | Ret^{P} | 3^{P}^{F} | 1^{P} | 1 | 2 | Ret^{P}^{F} | 3^{P}^{F} | Ret^{P} | 1^{P} | 2^{P}^{F} | Ret^{P} | 5^{F} | 3 | 1 | | 124 | 2nd |
| 1999 | West McLaren Mercedes | McLaren MP4/14 | FO110H 3.0 V10 | B | (United Kingdom) David Coulthard | Ret | Ret | 2 | Ret | 2 | 7 | Ret^{F} | 1 | 2 | 5^{F} | 2^{F} | 1 | 5 | Ret | Ret | Ret | | 124 | 2nd |

=== 2000s ===
(key)

| Year | Entrant | Chassis | Engine | Tyres | Drivers | 1 | 2 | 3 | 4 | 5 | 6 | 7 | 8 | 9 | 10 | 11 | 12 | 13 | 14 | 15 | 16 | 17 | 18 | 19 | Points | WCC |
|---|---|---|---|---|---|---|---|---|---|---|---|---|---|---|---|---|---|---|---|---|---|---|---|---|---|---|
| 2000 | West McLaren Mercedes | McLaren MP4/15 | FO110J 3.0 V10 | B | | AUS | BRA | SMR | GBR | ESP | EUR | MON | CAN | FRA | AUT | GER | HUN | BEL | ITA | USA | JPN | MAL | | | 152 | 2nd |
| 2000 | West McLaren Mercedes | McLaren MP4/15 | FO110J 3.0 V10 | B | (Finland) Mika Häkkinen | Ret^{P} | Ret^{P} | 2^{P}^{F} | 2^{P} | 1^{P}^{F} | 2 | 6^{F} | 4^{F} | 2 | 1^{P} | 2 | 1^{F} | 1^{P} | 2^{F} | Ret | 2^{F} | 4^{F} | | | 152 | 2nd |
| 2000 | West McLaren Mercedes | McLaren MP4/15 | FO110J 3.0 V10 | B | (United Kingdom) David Coulthard | Ret | DSQ | 3 | 1 | 2 | 3^{P} | 1 | 7 | 1^{F} | 2^{F} | 3^{P} | 3 | 4 | Ret | 5^{F} | 3 | 2 | | | 152 | 2nd |
| 2001 | West McLaren Mercedes | McLaren MP4-16 | FO110K 3.0 V10 | B | | AUS | MAL | BRA | SMR | ESP | AUT | MON | CAN | EUR | FRA | GBR | GER | HUN | BEL | ITA | USA | JPN | | | 102 | 2nd |
| 2001 | West McLaren Mercedes | McLaren MP4-16 | FO110K 3.0 V10 | B | (Finland) Mika Häkkinen | Ret | 6^{F} | Ret | 4 | 9 | Ret | Ret | 3 | 6 | DNS | 1^{F} | Ret | 5^{F} | 4 | Ret | 1 | 4 | | | 102 | 2nd |
| 2001 | West McLaren Mercedes | McLaren MP4-16 | FO110K 3.0 V10 | B | (United Kingdom) David Coulthard | 2 | 3 | 1 | 2^{P} | 5 | 1^{F} | 5^{P}^{F} | Ret | 3 | 4^{F} | Ret | Ret | 3 | 2 | Ret | 3 | 3 | | | 102 | 2nd |
| 2002 | West McLaren Mercedes | McLaren MP4-17 | FO110M 3.0 V10 | MI | | AUS | MAL | BRA | SMR | ESP | AUT | MON | CAN | EUR | GBR | FRA | GER | HUN | BEL | ITA | USA | JPN | | | 65 | 3rd |
| 2002 | West McLaren Mercedes | McLaren MP4-17 | FO110M 3.0 V10 | MI | (United Kingdom) David Coulthard | Ret | Ret | 3 | 6 | 3 | 6 | 1 | 2 | Ret | 10 | 3^{F} | 5 | 5 | 4 | 7 | 3 | Ret | | | 65 | 3rd |
| 2002 | West McLaren Mercedes | McLaren MP4-17 | FO110M 3.0 V10 | MI | (Finland) Kimi Räikkönen | 3^{F} | Ret | 12 | Ret | Ret | Ret | Ret | 4 | 3 | Ret | 2 | Ret | 4 | Ret | Ret | Ret | 3 | | | 65 | 3rd |
| 2003 | West McLaren Mercedes | McLaren MP4-17D | FO110M 3.0 V10 | MI | | AUS | MAL | BRA | SMR | ESP | AUT | MON | CAN | EUR | FRA | GBR | GER | HUN | ITA | USA | JPN | | | | 142 | 3rd |
| 2003 | West McLaren Mercedes | McLaren MP4-17D | FO110M 3.0 V10 | MI | (United Kingdom) David Coulthard | 1 | Ret | 4 | 5 | Ret | 5 | 7 | Ret | 15 | 5 | 5 | 2 | 5 | Ret | Ret | 3 | | | | 142 | 3rd |
| 2003 | West McLaren Mercedes | McLaren MP4-17D | FO110M 3.0 V10 | MI | (Finland) Kimi Räikkönen | 3^{F} | 1 | 2 | 2 | Ret | 2 | 2^{F} | 6 | Ret^{P}^{F} | 4 | 3 | Ret | 2 | 4 | 2^{P} | 2 | | | | 142 | 3rd |
| 2004 | West McLaren Mercedes | McLaren MP4-19; McLaren MP4-19B | FO110P 3.0 V10; FO110Q 3.0 V10 | MI | | AUS | MAL | BHR | SMR | ESP | MON | EUR | CAN | USA | FRA | GBR | GER | HUN | BEL | ITA | CHN | JPN | BRA | | 69 | 5th |
| 2004 | West McLaren Mercedes | McLaren MP4-19; McLaren MP4-19B | FO110P 3.0 V10; FO110Q 3.0 V10 | MI | (United Kingdom) David Coulthard | 8 | 6 | Ret | 12 | 10 | Ret | Ret | 6 | 7 | 6 | 7 | 4 | 9 | 7 | 6 | 9 | Ret | 11 | | 69 | 5th |
| 2004 | West McLaren Mercedes | McLaren MP4-19; McLaren MP4-19B | FO110P 3.0 V10; FO110Q 3.0 V10 | MI | (Finland) Kimi Räikkönen | Ret | Ret | Ret | 8 | 11 | Ret | Ret | 5 | 6 | 7 | 2^{P} | Ret^{F} | Ret | 1^{F} | Ret | 3 | 6 | 2 | | 69 | 5th |
| 2005 | Team McLaren Mercedes (Note: The team started the seasons as "West McLaren Mercedes" before they lost title sponsorship) | McLaren MP4-20 | FO110R 3.0 V10 | MI | | AUS | MAL | BHR | SMR | ESP | MON | EUR | CAN | USA | FRA | GBR | GER | HUN | TUR | ITA | BEL | BRA | JPN | CHN | 182 | 2nd |
| 2005 | Team McLaren Mercedes | McLaren MP4-20 | FO110R 3.0 V10 | MI | (Finland) Kimi Räikkönen | 8 | 9^{F} | 3 | Ret^{P} | 1^{P} | 1^{P} | 11 | 1^{F} | DNS | 2^{F} | 3^{F} | Ret^{P}^{F} | 1^{F} | 1^{P} | 4^{F} | 1 | 2^{F} | 1^{F} | 2^{F} | 182 | 2nd |
| 2005 | Team McLaren Mercedes | McLaren MP4-20 | FO110R 3.0 V10 | MI | (Colombia) Juan Pablo Montoya | 6 | 4 | | | 7 | 5 | 7 | DSQ | DNS | Ret | 1 | 2 | Ret | 3^{F} | 1^{P} | 14^{P} | 1 | Ret | Ret | 182 | 2nd |
| 2005 | Team McLaren Mercedes | McLaren MP4-20 | FO110R 3.0 V10 | MI | (Spain) Pedro de la Rosa | | | 5^{F} | | | | | | | | | | | | | | | | | 182 | 2nd |
| 2005 | Team McLaren Mercedes | McLaren MP4-20 | FO110R 3.0 V10 | MI | (Austria) Alexander Wurz | | | | 3 | | | | | | | | | | | | | | | | 182 | 2nd |
| 2006 | Team McLaren Mercedes | McLaren MP4-21 | FO 108S 2.4 V8 | MI | | BHR | MAL | AUS | SMR | EUR | ESP | MON | GBR | CAN | USA | FRA | GER | HUN | TUR | ITA | CHN | JPN | BRA | | 110 | 3rd |
| 2006 | Team McLaren Mercedes | McLaren MP4-21 | FO 108S 2.4 V8 | MI | (Finland) Kimi Räikkönen | 3 | Ret | 2^{F} | 5 | 4 | 5 | Ret | 3 | 3^{F} | Ret | 5 | 3^{P} | Ret^{P} | Ret | 2^{P}^{F} | Ret | 5 | 5 | | 110 | 3rd |
| 2006 | Team McLaren Mercedes | McLaren MP4-21 | FO 108S 2.4 V8 | MI | (Colombia) Juan Pablo Montoya | 5 | 4 | Ret | 3 | Ret | Ret | 2 | 6 | Ret | Ret | | | | | | | | | | 110 | 3rd |
| 2006 | Team McLaren Mercedes | McLaren MP4-21 | FO 108S 2.4 V8 | MI | (Spain) Pedro de la Rosa | | | | | | | | | | | 7 | Ret | 2 | 5 | Ret | 5 | 11 | 8 | | 110 | 3rd |
| 2007 | Vodafone McLaren Mercedes | McLaren MP4-22 | FO 108T 2.4 V8 | B | | AUS | MAL | BHR | ESP | MON | CAN | USA | FRA | GBR | EUR | HUN | TUR | ITA | BEL | JPN | CHN | BRA | | | 0 | EX |
| 2007 | Vodafone McLaren Mercedes | McLaren MP4-22 | FO 108T 2.4 V8 | B | (Spain) Fernando Alonso | 2 | 1 | 5 | 3 | 1^{P}^{F} | 7^{F} | 2 | 7 | 2 | 1 | 4 | 3 | 1^{P}^{F} | 3 | Ret | 2 | 3 | | | 0 | EX |
| 2007 | Vodafone McLaren Mercedes | McLaren MP4-22 | FO 108T 2.4 V8 | B | (United Kingdom) Lewis Hamilton | 3 | 2^{F} | 2 | 2 | 2 | 1^{P} | 1^{P} | 3 | 3^{P} | 9 | 1^{P} | 5 | 2 | 4 | 1^{P}^{F} | Ret^{P} | 7 | | | 0 | EX |
| 2008 | Vodafone McLaren Mercedes | McLaren MP4-23 | FO 108V 2.4 V8 | B | | AUS | MAL | BHR | ESP | TUR | MON | CAN | FRA | GBR | GER | HUN | EUR | BEL | ITA | SIN | JPN | CHN | BRA | | 151 | 2nd |
| 2008 | Vodafone McLaren Mercedes | McLaren MP4-23 | FO 108V 2.4 V8 | B | (United Kingdom) Lewis Hamilton | 1^{P} | 5 | 13 | 3 | 2 | 1 | Ret^{P} | 10 | 1 | 1^{P} | 5^{P} | 2 | 3^{P} | 7 | 3 | 12^{P} | 1^{P}^{F} | 5 | | 151 | 2nd |
| 2008 | Vodafone McLaren Mercedes | McLaren MP4-23 | FO 108V 2.4 V8 | B | (Finland) Heikki Kovalainen | 5^{F} | 3 | 5^{F} | Ret | 12 | 8 | 9 | 4 | 5^{P} | 5 | 1 | 4 | 10 | 2 | 10 | Ret | Ret | 7 | | 151 | 2nd |
| 2009 | Brawn GP | Brawn BGP 001 | FO 108W 2.4 V8 | B | | AUS | MAL | CHN | BHR | ESP | MON | TUR | GBR | GER | HUN | EUR | BEL | ITA | SIN | JPN | BRA | ABU | | | 172 | 1st |
| 2009 | Brawn GP | Brawn BGP 001 | FO 108W 2.4 V8 | B | (United Kingdom) Jenson Button | 1^{P} | 1^{P}^{F}^{‡} | 3 | 1 | 1^{P} | 1^{P} | 1^{F} | 6 | 5 | 7 | 7 | Ret | 2 | 5 | 8 | 5 | 3 | | | 172 | 1st |
| 2009 | Brawn GP | Brawn BGP 001 | FO 108W 2.4 V8 | B | (Brazil) Rubens Barrichello | 2 | 5^{‡} | 4^{F} | 5 | 2^{F} | 2 | Ret | 3 | 6 | 10 | 1 | 7 | 1 | 6 | 7 | 8^{P} | 4 | | | 172 | 1st |
| 2009 | Vodafone McLaren Mercedes | McLaren MP4-24 | FO 108W 2.4 V8 | B | (United Kingdom) Lewis Hamilton | DSQ | 7^{‡} | 6 | 4 | 9 | 12 | 13 | 16 | 18 | 1 | 2^{P} | Ret | 12^{P}^{†} | 1^{P} | 3 | 3 | Ret^{P} | | | 71 | 3rd |
| 2009 | Vodafone McLaren Mercedes | McLaren MP4-24 | FO 108W 2.4 V8 | B | (Finland) Heikki Kovalainen | Ret | Ret | 5 | 12 | Ret | Ret | 14 | Ret | 8 | 5 | 4 | 6 | 6 | 7 | 11 | 12 | 11 | | | 71 | 3rd |
| 2009 | Force India F1 Team | Force India VJM02 | FO 108W 2.4 V8 | B | (Germany) Adrian Sutil | 9 | 17 | 17 | 16 | Ret | 14 | 17 | 17 | 15 | Ret | 10 | 11 | 4^{F} | Ret | 13 | Ret | 17 | | | 13 | 9th |
| 2009 | Force India F1 Team | Force India VJM02 | FO 108W 2.4 V8 | B | (Italy) Giancarlo Fisichella | 11 | 18^{†} | 14 | 15 | 14 | 9 | Ret | 10 | 11 | 14 | 12 | 2^{P} | | | | | | | | 13 | 9th |
| 2009 | Force India F1 Team | Force India VJM02 | FO 108W 2.4 V8 | B | (Italy) Vitantonio Liuzzi | | | | | | | | | | | | | Ret | 14 | 14 | 11 | 15 | | | 13 | 9th |

=== 2010s ===
(key)

| Year | Entrant | Chassis | Engine | Tyres | Drivers | 1 | 2 | 3 | 4 | 5 | 6 | 7 | 8 | 9 | 10 | 11 | 12 | 13 | 14 | 15 | 16 | 17 | 18 | 19 | 20 | 21 | Points | WCC |
|---|---|---|---|---|---|---|---|---|---|---|---|---|---|---|---|---|---|---|---|---|---|---|---|---|---|---|---|---|
| 2010 | Vodafone McLaren Mercedes | McLaren MP4-25 | FO 108X 2.4 V8 | B | | BHR | AUS | MAL | CHN | ESP | MON | TUR | CAN | EUR | GBR | GER | HUN | BEL | ITA | SIN | JPN | KOR | BRA | ABU | | | 454 | 2nd |
| 2010 | Vodafone McLaren Mercedes | McLaren MP4-25 | FO 108X 2.4 V8 | B | (United Kingdom) Jenson Button | 7 | 1 | 8 | 1 | 5 | Ret | 2 | 2 | 3^{F} | 4 | 5 | 8 | Ret | 2 | 4 | 4 | 12 | 5 | 3 | | | 454 | 2nd |
| 2010 | Vodafone McLaren Mercedes | McLaren MP4-25 | FO 108X 2.4 V8 | B | (United Kingdom) Lewis Hamilton | 3 | 6 | 6 | 2^{F} | 14^{F}^{†} | 5 | 1 | 1^{P} | 2 | 2 | 4 | Ret | 1^{F} | Ret | Ret | 5 | 2 | 4^{F} | 2^{F} | | | 454 | 2nd |
| 2010 | Force India F1 Team | Force India VJM03 | FO 108X 2.4 V8 | B | (Germany) Adrian Sutil | 12 | Ret | 5 | 11 | 7 | 8 | 9 | 10 | 6 | 8 | 17 | Ret | 5 | 16 | 9 | Ret | Ret | 12 | 13 | | | 68 | 7th |
| 2010 | Force India F1 Team | Force India VJM03 | FO 108X 2.4 V8 | B | (Italy) Vitantonio Liuzzi | 9 | 7 | Ret | Ret | 15^{†} | 9 | 13 | 9 | 16 | 11 | 16 | 13 | 10 | 12 | Ret | Ret | 6 | Ret | Ret | | | 68 | 7th |
| 2011 | Vodafone McLaren Mercedes | McLaren MP4-26 | FO 108Y 2.4 V8 | P | | AUS | MAL | CHN | TUR | ESP | MON | CAN | EUR | GBR | GER | HUN | BEL | ITA | SIN | JPN | KOR | IND | ABU | BRA | | | 497 | 2nd |
| 2011 | Vodafone McLaren Mercedes | McLaren MP4-26 | FO 108Y 2.4 V8 | P | (United Kingdom) Lewis Hamilton | 2 | 8 | 1 | 4 | 2^{F} | 6 | Ret | 4 | 4 | 1^{F} | 4 | Ret | 4^{F} | 5 | 5 | 2^{P} | 7 | 1 | Ret | | | 497 | 2nd |
| 2011 | Vodafone McLaren Mercedes | McLaren MP4-26 | FO 108Y 2.4 V8 | P | (United Kingdom) Jenson Button | 6 | 2 | 4 | 6 | 3 | 3 | 1^{F} | 6 | Ret | Ret | 1 | 3 | 2 | 2^{F} | 1^{F} | 4 | 2 | 3 | 3 | | | 497 | 2nd |
| 2011 | Force India F1 Team | Force India VJM04 | FO 108Y 2.4 V8 | P | (Germany) Adrian Sutil | 9 | 11 | 15 | 13 | 13 | 7 | Ret | 9 | 11 | 6 | 14 | 7 | Ret | 8 | 11 | 11 | 9 | 8 | 6 | | | 69 | 6th |
| 2011 | Force India F1 Team | Force India VJM04 | FO 108Y 2.4 V8 | P | (United Kingdom) Paul di Resta | 10 | 10 | 11 | Ret | 12 | 12 | 18 | 14 | 15 | 13 | 7 | 11 | 8 | 6 | 12 | 10 | 13 | 9 | 8 | | | 69 | 6th |
| 2012 | Vodafone McLaren Mercedes | McLaren MP4-27 | FO 108Z 2.4 V8 | P | | AUS | MAL | CHN | BHR | ESP | MON | CAN | EUR | GBR | GER | HUN | BEL | ITA | SIN | JPN | KOR | IND | ABU | USA | BRA | | 378 | 3rd |
| 2012 | Vodafone McLaren Mercedes | McLaren MP4-27 | FO 108Z 2.4 V8 | P | (United Kingdom) Jenson Button | 1^{F} | 14 | 2 | 18^{†} | 9 | 16^{†} | 16 | 8 | 10 | 2 | 6 | 1^{P} | Ret | 2 | 4 | Ret | 5^{F} | 4 | 5 | 1 | | 378 | 3rd |
| 2012 | Vodafone McLaren Mercedes | McLaren MP4-27 | FO 108Z 2.4 V8 | P | (United Kingdom) Lewis Hamilton | 3^{P} | 3^{P} | 3 | 8 | 8 | 5 | 1 | 19^{†} | 8 | Ret | 1^{P} | Ret | 1^{P} | Ret^{P} | 5 | 10 | 4 | Ret^{P} | 1 | Ret^{P}^{F} | | 378 | 3rd |
| 2012 | Sahara Force India F1 Team | Force India VJM05 | FO 108Z 2.4 V8 | P | (United Kingdom) Paul di Resta | 10 | 7 | 12 | 6 | 14 | 7 | 11 | 7 | Ret | 11 | 12 | 10 | 8 | 4 | 12 | 12 | 12 | 9 | 15 | 19 | | 109 | 7th |
| 2012 | Sahara Force India F1 Team | Force India VJM05 | FO 108Z 2.4 V8 | P | (Germany) Nico Hülkenberg | Ret | 9 | 15 | 12 | 10 | 8 | 12 | 5 | 12 | 9 | 11 | 4 | 21 | 14^{F} | 7 | 6 | 8 | Ret | 8 | 5 | | 109 | 7th |
| 2013 | Vodafone McLaren Mercedes | McLaren MP4-28 | FO 108F 2.4 V8 | P | | AUS | MAL | CHN | BHR | ESP | MON | CAN | GBR | GER | HUN | BEL | ITA | SIN | KOR | JPN | IND | ABU | USA | BRA | | | 122 | 5th |
| 2013 | Vodafone McLaren Mercedes | McLaren MP4-28 | FO 108F 2.4 V8 | P | (United Kingdom) Jenson Button | 9 | 17^{†} | 5 | 10 | 8 | 6 | 12 | 13 | 6 | 7 | 6 | 10 | 7 | 8 | 9 | 14 | 12 | 10 | 4 | | | 122 | 5th |
| 2013 | Vodafone McLaren Mercedes | McLaren MP4-28 | FO 108F 2.4 V8 | P | (Mexico) Sergio Pérez | 11 | 9^{F} | 11 | 6 | 9 | 16^{†} | 11 | 20^{†} | 8 | 9 | 11 | 12 | 8 | 10 | 15 | 5 | 9 | 7 | 6 | | | 122 | 5th |
| 2013 | Sahara Force India F1 Team | Force India VJM06 | FO 108F 2.4 V8 | P | (United Kingdom) Paul di Resta | 8 | Ret | 8 | 4 | 7 | 9 | 7 | 9 | 11 | 18^{†} | Ret | Ret | 20^{†} | Ret | 11 | 8 | 6 | 15 | 11 | | | 77 | 6th |
| 2013 | Sahara Force India F1 Team | Force India VJM06 | FO 108F 2.4 V8 | P | (Germany) Adrian Sutil | 7 | Ret | Ret | 13 | 13 | 5 | 10 | 7 | 13 | Ret | 9 | 16^{†} | 10 | 20^{†} | 14 | 9 | 10 | Ret | 13 | | | 77 | 6th |
| 2014 | Williams Martini Racing | Williams FW36 | PU106A Hybrid 1.6 V6 t | P | | AUS | MAL | BHR | CHN | ESP | MON | CAN | AUT | GBR | GER | HUN | BEL | ITA | SIN | JPN | RUS | USA | BRA | ABU | | | 320 | 3rd |
| 2014 | Williams Martini Racing | Williams FW36 | PU106A Hybrid 1.6 V6 t | P | (Brazil) Felipe Massa | Ret | 7 | 7 | 15 | 13 | 7 | 12^{F}^{†} | 4^{P} | Ret | Ret | 5 | 13 | 3 | 5 | 7 | 11 | 4 | 3 | 2 | | | 320 | 3rd |
| 2014 | Williams Martini Racing | Williams FW36 | PU106A Hybrid 1.6 V6 t | P | (Finland) Valtteri Bottas | 5 | 8 | 8 | 7 | 5 | Ret | 7 | 3 | 2 | 2 | 8 | 3 | 4 | 11 | 6 | 3^{F} | 5 | 10 | 3 | | | 320 | 3rd |
| 2014 | McLaren Mercedes | McLaren MP4-29 | PU106A Hybrid 1.6 V6 t | P | (Denmark) Kevin Magnussen | 2 | 9 | Ret | 13 | 12 | 10 | 9 | 7 | 7 | 9 | 12 | 12 | 10 | 10 | 14 | 5 | 8 | 9 | 11 | | | 181 | 5th |
| 2014 | McLaren Mercedes | McLaren MP4-29 | PU106A Hybrid 1.6 V6 t | P | (United Kingdom) Jenson Button | 3 | 6 | 17^{†} | 11 | 11 | 6 | 4 | 11 | 4 | 8 | 10 | 6 | 8 | Ret | 5 | 4 | 12 | 4 | 5 | | | 181 | 5th |
| 2014 | Sahara Force India F1 Team | Force India VJM07 | PU106A Hybrid 1.6 V6 t | P | (Mexico) Sergio Pérez | 10 | DNS | 3 | 9 | 9 | Ret | 11^{†} | 6^{F} | 11 | 10 | Ret | 8 | 7 | 7 | 10 | 10 | Ret | 15 | 7 | | | 155 | 6th |
| 2014 | Sahara Force India F1 Team | Force India VJM07 | PU106A Hybrid 1.6 V6 t | P | (Germany) Nico Hülkenberg | 6 | 5 | 5 | 6 | 10 | 5 | 5 | 9 | 8 | 7 | Ret | 10 | 12 | 9 | 8 | 12 | Ret | 8 | 6 | | | 155 | 6th |
| 2015 | Williams Martini Racing | Williams FW37 | PU106B Hybrid 1.6 V6 t | P | | AUS | MAL | CHN | BHR | ESP | MON | CAN | AUT | GBR | HUN | BEL | ITA | SIN | JPN | RUS | USA | MEX | BRA | ABU | | | 257 | 3rd |
| 2015 | Williams Martini Racing | Williams FW37 | PU106B Hybrid 1.6 V6 t | P | (Brazil) Felipe Massa | 4 | 6 | 5 | 10 | 6 | 15 | 6 | 3 | 4 | 12 | 6 | 3 | Ret | 17 | 4 | Ret | 6 | DSQ | 8 | | | 257 | 3rd |
| 2015 | Williams Martini Racing | Williams FW37 | PU106B Hybrid 1.6 V6 t | P | (Finland) Valtteri Bottas | DNS | 5 | 6 | 4 | 4 | 14 | 3 | 5 | 5 | 13 | 9 | 4 | 5 | 5 | 12^{†} | Ret | 3 | 5 | 13 | | | 257 | 3rd |
| 2015 | Sahara Force India F1 Team | Force India VJM08; Force India VJM08B | PU106B Hybrid 1.6 V6 t | P | (Mexico) Sergio Pérez | 10 | 13 | 11 | 8 | 13 | 7 | 11 | 9 | 9 | Ret | 5 | 6 | 7 | 12 | 3 | 5 | 8 | 12 | 5 | | | 136 | 5th |
| 2015 | Sahara Force India F1 Team | Force India VJM08; Force India VJM08B | PU106B Hybrid 1.6 V6 t | P | (Germany) Nico Hülkenberg | 7 | 14 | Ret | 13 | 15 | 11 | 8 | 6 | 7 | Ret | DNS | 7 | Ret | 6 | Ret | Ret | 7 | 6 | 7 | | | 136 | 5th |
| 2015 | Lotus F1 Team | Lotus E23 Hybrid | PU106B Hybrid 1.6 V6 t | P | (France) Romain Grosjean | Ret | 11 | 7 | 7 | 8 | 12 | 10 | Ret | Ret | 7 | 3 | Ret | 13^{†} | 7 | Ret | Ret | 10 | 8 | 9 | | | 78 | 6th |
| 2015 | Lotus F1 Team | Lotus E23 Hybrid | PU106B Hybrid 1.6 V6 t | P | (Venezuela) Pastor Maldonado | Ret | Ret | Ret | 15 | Ret | Ret | 7 | 7 | Ret | 14 | Ret | Ret | 12 | 8 | 7 | 8 | 11 | 10 | Ret | | | 78 | 6th |
| 2016 | Sahara Force India F1 Team | Force India VJM09 | PU106C Hybrid 1.6 V6 t | P | | AUS | BHR | CHN | RUS | ESP | MON | CAN | EUR | AUT | GBR | HUN | GER | BEL | ITA | SIN | MAL | JPN | USA | MEX | BRA | ABU | 173 | 4th |
| 2016 | Sahara Force India F1 Team | Force India VJM09 | PU106C Hybrid 1.6 V6 t | P | (Mexico) Sergio Pérez | 13 | 16 | 11 | 9 | 7 | 3 | 10 | 3 | 17^{†} | 6 | 11 | 10 | 5 | 8 | 8 | 6 | 7 | 8 | 10 | 4 | 8 | 173 | 4th |
| 2016 | Sahara Force India F1 Team | Force India VJM09 | PU106C Hybrid 1.6 V6 t | P | (Germany) Nico Hülkenberg | 7 | 15 | 15^{F} | Ret | Ret | 6 | 8 | 9 | 19^{†} | 7 | 10 | 7 | 4 | 10 | Ret | 8 | 8 | Ret | 7 | 7 | 7 | 173 | 4th |
| 2016 | Williams Martini Racing | Williams FW38 | PU106C Hybrid 1.6 V6 t | P | (Brazil) Felipe Massa | 5 | 8 | 6 | 5 | 8 | 10 | Ret | 10 | 20^{†} | 11 | 18 | Ret | 10 | 9 | 12 | 13 | 9 | 7 | 9 | Ret | 9 | 138 | 5th |
| 2016 | Williams Martini Racing | Williams FW38 | PU106C Hybrid 1.6 V6 t | P | (Finland) Valtteri Bottas | 8 | 9 | 10 | 4 | 5 | 12 | 3 | 6 | 9 | 14 | 9 | 9 | 8 | 6 | Ret | 5 | 10 | 16 | 8 | 11 | Ret | 138 | 5th |
| 2016 | Manor Racing MRT | Manor MRT05 | PU106C Hybrid 1.6 V6 t | P | (Indonesia) Rio Haryanto | Ret | 17 | 21 | Ret | 17 | 15 | 19 | 18 | 16 | Ret | 21 | 20 | | | | | | | | | | 1 | 11th |
| 2016 | Manor Racing MRT | Manor MRT05 | PU106C Hybrid 1.6 V6 t | P | (France) Esteban Ocon | | | | | | | | | | | | | 16 | 18 | 18 | 16 | 21 | 18 | 21 | 12 | 13 | 1 | 11th |
| 2016 | Manor Racing MRT | Manor MRT05 | PU106C Hybrid 1.6 V6 t | P | (Germany) Pascal Wehrlein | 16 | 13 | 18 | 18 | 16 | 14 | 17 | Ret | 10 | Ret | 19 | 17 | Ret | Ret | 16 | 15 | 22 | 17 | Ret | 15 | 14 | 1 | 11th |
| 2017 | Sahara Force India F1 Team | Force India VJM10 | M08 EQ Power+ 1.6 V6 t | P | | AUS | CHN | BHR | RUS | ESP | MON | CAN | AZE | AUT | GBR | HUN | BEL | ITA | SIN | MAL | JPN | USA | MEX | BRA | ABU | | 187 | 4th |
| 2017 | Sahara Force India F1 Team | Force India VJM10 | M08 EQ Power+ 1.6 V6 t | P | (Mexico) Sergio Pérez | 7 | 9 | 7 | 6 | 4 | 13^{F} | 5 | Ret | 7 | 9 | 8 | 17^{†} | 9 | 5 | 6 | 7 | 8 | 7 | 9 | 7 | | 187 | 4th |
| 2017 | Sahara Force India F1 Team | Force India VJM10 | M08 EQ Power+ 1.6 V6 t | P | (France) Esteban Ocon | 10 | 10 | 10 | 7 | 5 | 12 | 6 | 6 | 8 | 8 | 9 | 9 | 6 | 10 | 10 | 6 | 6 | 5 | Ret | 8 | | 187 | 4th |
| 2017 | Williams Martini Racing | Williams FW40 | M08 EQ Power+ 1.6 V6 t | P | (Canada) Lance Stroll | Ret | Ret | Ret | 11 | 16 | 15^{†} | 9 | 3 | 10 | 16 | 14 | 11 | 7 | 8 | 8 | Ret | 11 | 6 | 16 | 18 | | 83 | 5th |
| 2017 | Williams Martini Racing | Williams FW40 | M08 EQ Power+ 1.6 V6 t | P | (Brazil) Felipe Massa | 6 | 14 | 6 | 9 | 13 | 9 | Ret | Ret | 9 | 10 | WD | 8 | 8 | 11 | 9 | 10 | 9 | 11 | 7 | 10 | | 83 | 5th |
| 2017 | Williams Martini Racing | Williams FW40 | M08 EQ Power+ 1.6 V6 t | P | (United Kingdom) Paul di Resta | | | | | | | | | | | Ret | | | | | | | | | | | 83 | 5th |
| 2018 | Sahara Force India F1 Team | Force India VJM11 | M09 EQ Power+ 1.6 V6 t | P | | AUS | BHR | CHN | AZE | ESP | MON | CAN | FRA | AUT | GBR | GER | HUN | BEL | ITA | SIN | RUS | JPN | USA | MEX | BRA | ABU | 0 | EX |
| 2018 | Sahara Force India F1 Team | Force India VJM11 | M09 EQ Power+ 1.6 V6 t | P | (Mexico) Sergio Pérez | 11 | 16 | 12 | 3 | 9 | 12 | 14 | Ret | 7 | 10 | 7 | 14 | | | | | | | | | | 0 | EX |
| 2018 | Sahara Force India F1 Team | Force India VJM11 | M09 EQ Power+ 1.6 V6 t | P | (France) Esteban Ocon | 12 | 10 | 11 | Ret | Ret | 6 | 9 | Ret | 6 | 7 | 8 | 13 | | | | | | | | | | 0 | EX |
| 2018 | Racing Point Force India F1 Team | Force India VJM11 | M09 EQ Power+ 1.6 V6 t | P | (Mexico) Sergio Pérez | | | | | | | | | | | | | 5 | 7 | 16 | 10 | 7 | 8 | Ret | 10 | 8 | 52 | 7th |
| 2018 | Racing Point Force India F1 Team | Force India VJM11 | M09 EQ Power+ 1.6 V6 t | P | (France) Esteban Ocon | | | | | | | | | | | | | 6 | 6 | Ret | 9 | 9 | DSQ | 11 | 14 | Ret | 52 | 7th |
| 2018 | Williams Martini Racing | Williams FW41 | M09 EQ Power+ 1.6 V6 t | P | (Canada) Lance Stroll | 14 | 14 | 14 | 8 | 11 | 17 | Ret | 17^{†} | 14 | 12 | Ret | 17 | 13 | 9 | 14 | 15 | 17 | 14 | 12 | 18 | 13 | 7 | 10th |
| 2018 | Williams Martini Racing | Williams FW41 | M09 EQ Power+ 1.6 V6 t | P | (Russia) Sergey Sirotkin | Ret | 15 | 15 | Ret | 14 | 16 | 17 | 15 | 13 | 14 | Ret | 16 | 12 | 10 | 19 | 18 | 16 | 13 | 13 | 16 | 15 | 7 | 10th |
| 2019 | SportPesa Racing Point F1 Team | Racing Point RP19 | BWT Mercedes 1.6 V6 t | P | | AUS | BHR | CHN | AZE | ESP | MON | CAN | FRA | AUT | GBR | GER | HUN | BEL | ITA | SIN | RUS | JPN | MEX | USA | BRA | ABU | 73 | 7th |
| 2019 | SportPesa Racing Point F1 Team | Racing Point RP19 | BWT Mercedes 1.6 V6 t | P | (Mexico) Sergio Pérez | 13 | 10 | 8 | 6 | 15 | 12 | 12 | 12 | 11 | 17 | Ret | 11 | 6 | 7 | Ret | 7 | 8 | 7 | 10 | 9 | 7 | 73 | 7th |
| 2019 | SportPesa Racing Point F1 Team | Racing Point RP19 | BWT Mercedes 1.6 V6 t | P | (Canada) Lance Stroll | 9 | 14 | 12 | 9 | Ret | 16 | 9 | 13 | 14 | 13 | 4 | 17 | 10 | 12 | 13 | 11 | 9 | 12 | 13 | 19^{†} | Ret | 73 | 7th |
| 2019 | ROKiT Williams Racing | Williams FW42 | M10 EQ Power+ 1.6 V6 t | P | (United Kingdom) George Russell | 16 | 15 | 16 | 15 | 17 | 15 | 16 | 19 | 18 | 14 | 11 | 16 | 15 | 14 | Ret | Ret | 16 | 16 | 17 | 12 | 17 | 1 | 10th |
| 2019 | ROKiT Williams Racing | Williams FW42 | M10 EQ Power+ 1.6 V6 t | P | (Poland) Robert Kubica | 17 | 16 | 17 | 16 | 18 | 18 | 18 | 18 | 20 | 15 | 10 | 19 | 17 | 17 | 16 | Ret | 17 | 18 | Ret | 16 | 19 | 1 | 10th |

=== 2020s ===
(key)

| Year | Entrant | Chassis | Engine | Tyres | Drivers | 1 | 2 | 3 | 4 | 5 | 6 | 7 | 8 | 9 | 10 | 11 | 12 | 13 | 14 | 15 | 16 | 17 | 18 | 19 | 20 | 21 | 22 | 23 | 24 | Points | WCC |
|---|---|---|---|---|---|---|---|---|---|---|---|---|---|---|---|---|---|---|---|---|---|---|---|---|---|---|---|---|---|---|---|
| 2020 | BWT Racing Point F1 Team | Racing Point RP20 | BWT Mercedes 1.6 V6 t | P | | AUT | STY | HUN | GBR | 70A | ESP | BEL | ITA | TUS | RUS | EIF | POR | EMI | TUR | BHR | SKH | ABU | | | | | | | | 195 | 4th |
| 2020 | BWT Racing Point F1 Team | Racing Point RP20 | BWT Mercedes 1.6 V6 t | P | (Mexico) Sergio Pérez | 6 | 6 | 7 | WD | | 5 | 10 | 10 | 5 | 4 | 4 | 7 | 6 | 2 | 18† | 1 | Ret | | | | | | | | 195 | 4th |
| 2020 | BWT Racing Point F1 Team | Racing Point RP20 | BWT Mercedes 1.6 V6 t | P | (Germany) Nico Hülkenberg | | | | DNS | 7 | | | | | | 8 | | | | | | | | | | | | | | 195 | 4th |
| 2020 | BWT Racing Point F1 Team | Racing Point RP20 | BWT Mercedes 1.6 V6 t | P | (Canada) Lance Stroll | Ret | 7 | 4 | 9 | 6 | 4 | 9 | 3 | Ret | Ret | WD | Ret | 13 | 9^{P} | Ret | 3 | 10 | | | | | | | | 195 | 4th |
| 2020 | Williams Racing | Williams FW43 | M11 EQ Performance 1.6 V6 t | P | (Canada) Nicholas Latifi | 11 | 17 | 19 | 15 | 19 | 18 | 16 | 11 | Ret | 16 | 14 | 18 | 11 | Ret | 14 | Ret | 17 | | | | | | | | 0 | 10th |
| 2020 | Williams Racing | Williams FW43 | M11 EQ Performance 1.6 V6 t | P | (United Kingdom) George Russell | Ret | 16 | 18 | 12 | 18 | 17 | Ret | 14 | 11 | 18 | Ret | 14 | Ret | 16 | 12 | | 15 | | | | | | | | 0 | 10th |
| 2020 | Williams Racing | Williams FW43 | M11 EQ Performance 1.6 V6 t | P | (United Kingdom) Jack Aitken | | | | | | | | | | | | | | | | 16 | | | | | | | | | 0 | 10th |
| 2021 | Aston Martin Cognizant F1 Team | Aston Martin AMR21 | M12 E Performance 1.6 V6 t | P | | BHR | EMI | POR | ESP | MON | AZE | FRA | STY | AUT | GBR | HUN | BEL | NED | ITA | RUS | TUR | USA | MXC | SAP | QAT | SAU | ABU | | | 77 | 7th |
| 2021 | Aston Martin Cognizant F1 Team | Aston Martin AMR21 | M12 E Performance 1.6 V6 t | P | (Germany) Sebastian Vettel | 15 | 15† | 13 | 13 | 5 | 2 | 9 | 12 | 17† | Ret | DSQ | 5^{‡} | 13 | 12 | 12 | 18 | 10 | 7 | 11 | 10 | Ret | 11 | | | 77 | 7th |
| 2021 | Aston Martin Cognizant F1 Team | Aston Martin AMR21 | M12 E Performance 1.6 V6 t | P | (Canada) Lance Stroll | 10 | 8 | 14 | 11 | 8 | Ret | 10 | 8 | 13 | 8 | Ret | 20 | 12 | 7 | 11 | 9 | 12 | 14 | Ret | 6 | 11 | 13 | | | 77 | 7th |
| 2021 | McLaren F1 Team | McLaren MCL35M | M12 E Performance 1.6 V6 t | P | (Australia) Daniel Ricciardo | 7 | 6 | 9 | 6 | 12 | 9 | 6 | 13 | 7 | 5 | 11 | 4^{‡} | 11 | 1^{F 3} | 4 | 13 | 5 | 12 | Ret | 12 | 5 | 12 | | | 275 | 4th |
| 2021 | McLaren F1 Team | McLaren MCL35M | M12 E Performance 1.6 V6 t | P | (United Kingdom) Lando Norris | 4 | 3 | 5 | 8 | 3 | 5 | 5 | 5 | 3 | 4 | Ret | 14 | 10 | 2 | 7^{P}^{F} | 7 | 8 | 10 | 10 | 9 | 10 | 7 | | | 275 | 4th |
| 2021 | Williams Racing | Williams FW43B | M12 E Performance 1.6 V6 t | P | (Canada) Nicholas Latifi | 18† | Ret | 18 | 16 | 15 | 16 | 18 | 17 | 16 | 14 | 7 | 9^{‡} | 16 | 11 | 19† | 17 | 15 | 17 | 16 | Ret | 12 | Ret | | | 23 | 8th |
| 2021 | Williams Racing | Williams FW43B | M12 E Performance 1.6 V6 t | P | (United Kingdom) George Russell | 14 | Ret | 16 | 14 | 14 | 17† | 12 | Ret | 11 | 12 | 8 | 2^{‡} | 17† | 9 | 10 | 15 | 14 | 16 | 13 | 17 | Ret | Ret | | | 23 | 8th |
| 2022 | Aston Martin Aramco Cognizant F1 Team | Aston Martin AMR22 | M13 E Performance 1.6 V6 t | P | | BHR | SAU | AUS | EMI | MIA | ESP | MON | AZE | CAN | GBR | AUT | FRA | HUN | BEL | NED | ITA | SIN | JPN | USA | MXC | SAP | ABU | | | 55 | 7th |
| 2022 | Aston Martin Aramco Cognizant F1 Team | Aston Martin AMR22 | M13 E Performance 1.6 V6 t | P | (Germany) Sebastian Vettel | | | Ret | 8 | 17† | 11 | 10 | 6 | 12 | 9 | 17 | 11 | 10 | 8 | 14 | Ret | 8 | 6 | 8 | 14 | 11 | 10 | | | 55 | 7th |
| 2022 | Aston Martin Aramco Cognizant F1 Team | Aston Martin AMR22 | M13 E Performance 1.6 V6 t | P | (Germany) Nico Hülkenberg | 17 | 12 | | | | | | | | | | | | | | | | | | | | | | | 55 | 7th |
| 2022 | Aston Martin Aramco Cognizant F1 Team | Aston Martin AMR22 | M13 E Performance 1.6 V6 t | P | (Canada) Lance Stroll | 12 | 13 | 12 | 10 | 10 | 15 | 14 | 16† | 10 | 11 | 13 | 10 | 11 | 11 | 10 | Ret | 6 | 12 | Ret | 15 | 10 | 8 | | | 55 | 7th |
| 2022 | McLaren F1 Team | McLaren MCL36 | M13 E Performance 1.6 V6 t | P | (United Kingdom) Lando Norris | 15 | 7 | 5 | 3^{5} | Ret | 8 | 6^{F} | 9 | 15 | 6 | 7 | 7 | 7 | 12 | 7 | 7 | 4 | 10 | 6 | 9 | Ret^{7} | 6^{F} | | | 159 | 5th |
| 2022 | McLaren F1 Team | McLaren MCL36 | M13 E Performance 1.6 V6 t | P | (Australia) Daniel Ricciardo | 14 | Ret | 6 | 18^{6} | 13 | 12 | 13 | 8 | 11 | 13 | 9 | 9 | 15 | 15 | 17 | Ret | 5 | 11 | 16 | 7 | Ret | 9 | | | 159 | 5th |
| 2022 | Williams Racing | Williams FW44 | M13 E Performance 1.6 V6 t | P | (Canada) Nicholas Latifi | 16 | Ret | 16 | 16 | 14 | 16 | 15 | 15 | 16 | 12 | Ret | Ret | 18 | 18 | 18 | 15 | Ret | 9 | 17 | 18 | 16 | 19† | | | 8 | 10th |
| 2022 | Williams Racing | Williams FW44 | M13 E Performance 1.6 V6 t | P | (Thailand) Alexander Albon | 13 | 14† | 10 | 11 | 9 | 18 | Ret | 12 | 13 | Ret | 12 | 13 | 17 | 10 | 12 | WD | Ret | Ret | 13 | 12 | 15 | 13 | | | 8 | 10th |
| 2022 | Williams Racing | Williams FW44 | M13 E Performance 1.6 V6 t | P | (Netherlands) Nyck de Vries | | | | | | | | | | | | | | | | 9 | | | | | | | | | 8 | 10th |
| 2023 | Aston Martin Aramco Cognizant F1 Team | Aston Martin AMR23 | M14 E Performance 1.6 V6 t | P | | BHR | SAU | AUS | AZE | MIA | MON | ESP | CAN | AUT | GBR | HUN | BEL | NED | ITA | SIN | JPN | QAT | USA | MXC | SAP | LVG | ABU | | | 280 | 5th |
| 2023 | Aston Martin Aramco Cognizant F1 Team | Aston Martin AMR23 | M14 E Performance 1.6 V6 t | P | (Spain) Fernando Alonso | 3 | 3 | 3 | 4^{6} | 3 | 2 | 7 | 2 | 5^{5} | 7 | 9 | 5 | 2^{F} | 9 | 15 | 8 | 6^{8} | Ret | Ret | 3 | 9 | 7 | | | 280 | 5th |
| 2023 | Aston Martin Aramco Cognizant F1 Team | Aston Martin AMR23 | M14 E Performance 1.6 V6 t | P | (Canada) Lance Stroll | 6 | Ret | 4 | 7^{8} | 12 | Ret | 6 | 9 | 9^{4} | 14 | 10 | 9 | 11 | 16 | WD | Ret | 11 | 7 | 17† | 5 | 5 | 10 | | | 280 | 5th |
| 2023 | McLaren F1 Team | McLaren MCL60 | M14 E Performance 1.6 V6 t | P | (United Kingdom) Lando Norris | 17 | 17 | 6 | 9 | 17 | 9 | 17 | 13 | 4 | 2 | 2 | 7^{6} | 7 | 8 | 2 | 2 | 3^{3} | 2^{4} | 5 | 2^{2 F} | Ret | 5 | | | 302 | 4th |
| 2023 | McLaren F1 Team | McLaren MCL60 | M14 E Performance 1.6 V6 t | P | (Australia) Oscar Piastri | Ret | 15 | 8 | 11 | 19 | 10 | 13 | 11 | 16 | 4 | 5 | Ret^{2} | 9 | 12^{F} | 7 | 3 | 2^{1} | Ret | 8 | 14 | 10^{F} | 6 | | | 302 | 4th |
| 2023 | Williams Racing | Williams FW45 | M14 E Performance 1.6 V6 t | P | (Thailand) Alexander Albon | 10 | Ret | Ret | 12 | 14 | 14 | 16 | 7 | 11 | 8 | 11 | 14 | 8 | 7 | 11 | Ret | 13^{7} | 9 | 9 | Ret | 12 | 14 | | | 28 | 7th |
| 2023 | Williams Racing | Williams FW45 | M14 E Performance 1.6 V6 t | P | (United States) Logan Sargeant | 12 | 16 | 16† | 16 | 20 | 18 | 20 | Ret | 13 | 11 | 18† | 17 | Ret | 13 | 14 | Ret | Ret | 10 | 16† | 11 | 16 | 16 | | | 28 | 7th |
| 2024 | Aston Martin Aramco F1 Team | Aston Martin AMR24 | M15 E Performance 1.6 V6 t | P | | BHR | SAU | AUS | JPN | CHN | MIA | EMI | MON | CAN | ESP | AUT | GBR | HUN | BEL | NED | ITA | AZE | SIN | USA | MXC | SAP | LVG | QAT | ABU | 94 | 5th |
| 2024 | Aston Martin Aramco F1 Team | Aston Martin AMR24 | M15 E Performance 1.6 V6 t | P | (Spain) Fernando Alonso | 9 | 5 | 8 | 6 | 7^{F} | 9 | 19 | 11 | 6 | 12 | 18^{F} | 8 | 11 | 8 | 10 | 11 | 6 | 8 | 13 | Ret | 14 | 11 | 7 | 9 | 94 | 5th |
| 2024 | Aston Martin Aramco F1 Team | Aston Martin AMR24 | M15 E Performance 1.6 V6 t | P | (Canada) Lance Stroll | 10 | Ret | 6 | 12 | 15 | 17 | 9 | 14 | 7 | 14 | 13 | 7 | 10 | 11 | 13 | 19 | 19† | 14 | 15 | 11 | DNS | 15 | Ret | 14 | 94 | 5th |
| 2024 | McLaren F1 Team | McLaren MCL38 | M15 E Performance 1.6 V6 t | P | (United Kingdom) Lando Norris | 6 | 8 | 3 | 5 | 2^{6} | 1 | 2 | 4 | 2 | 2^{P}^{F} | 20†^{3} | 3 | 2^{P} | 5 | 1^{P}^{F} | 3^{P}^{F} | 4^{F} | 1^{P} | 4^{3 P} | 2 | 6^{1 P} | 6^{F} | 10^{2 F} | 1^{P} | 666 | 1st |
| 2024 | McLaren F1 Team | McLaren MCL38 | M15 E Performance 1.6 V6 t | P | (Australia) Oscar Piastri | 8 | 4 | 4 | 8 | 8^{7} | 13^{6 F} | 4 | 2 | 5 | 7 | 2^{2} | 4 | 1 | 2 | 4 | 2 | 1 | 3 | 5 | 8 | 8^{2} | 7 | 3^{1} | 10 | 666 | 1st |
| 2024 | Williams Racing | Williams FW46 | M15 E Performance 1.6 V6 t | P | (Thailand) Alexander Albon | 15 | 11 | 11 | Ret | 12 | 18 | Ret | 9 | Ret | 18 | 15 | 9 | 14 | 12 | 14 | 9 | 7 | Ret | 16 | Ret | DNS | Ret | 15 | 11 | 17 | 9th |
| 2024 | Williams Racing | Williams FW46 | M15 E Performance 1.6 V6 t | P | (United States) Logan Sargeant | 20 | 14 | WD | 17 | 17 | Ret | 17 | 15 | Ret | 20 | 19 | 11 | 17 | 17 | 16 | | | | | | | | | | 17 | 9th |
| 2024 | Williams Racing | Williams FW46 | M15 E Performance 1.6 V6 t | P | (Argentina) Franco Colapinto | | | | | | | | | | | | | | | | 12 | 8 | 11 | 10 | 12 | Ret | 14 | Ret | Ret | 17 | 9th |
| 2025 | Aston Martin Aramco F1 Team | Aston Martin AMR25 | M16 E Performance 1.6 V6 t | P | | AUS | CHN | JPN | BHR | SAU | MIA | EMI | MON | ESP | CAN | AUT | GBR | BEL | HUN | NED | ITA | AZE | SIN | USA | MXC | SAP | LVG | QAT | ABU | 89 | 7th |
| 2025 | Aston Martin Aramco F1 Team | Aston Martin AMR25 | M16 E Performance 1.6 V6 t | P | (Spain) Fernando Alonso | Ret | Ret | 11 | 15 | 11 | 15 | 11 | Ret | 9 | 7 | 7 | 9 | 17 | 5 | 8 | Ret | 15 | 7 | 10 | Ret | 14^{6} | 11 | 7^{7} | 6 | 89 | 7th |
| 2025 | Aston Martin Aramco F1 Team | Aston Martin AMR25 | M16 E Performance 1.6 V6 t | P | (Canada) Lance Stroll | 6 | 9 | 20 | 17 | 16 | 16^{5} | 15 | 15 | WD | 17 | 14 | 7 | 14 | 7 | 7 | 18 | 17 | 13 | 12 | 14 | 16 | Ret | 17† | 10 | 89 | 7th |
| 2025 | McLaren F1 Team | McLaren MCL39 | M16 E Performance 1.6 V6 t | P | (United Kingdom) Lando Norris | 1^{P}^{F} | 2^{8 F} | 2 | 3 | 4^{F} | 2^{1 F} | 2 | 1^{P}^{F} | 2 | 18† | 1^{P} | 1 | 2^{3 P} | 1 | 18† | 2^{F} | 7 | 3 | 2 | 1^{P} | 1^{1 P} | DSQ^{P} | 4^{3} | 3 | 833 | 1st |
| 2025 | McLaren F1 Team | McLaren MCL39 | M16 E Performance 1.6 V6 t | P | (Australia) Oscar Piastri | 9 | 1^{2 P} | 3 | 1^{P}^{F} | 1 | 1^{2} | 3^{P} | 3 | 1^{P}^{F} | 4 | 2^{F} | 2^{F} | 1^{2} | 2 | 1^{P}^{F} | 3 | Ret | 4 | 5 | 5 | 5 | DSQ | 2^{1 P F} | 2 | 833 | 1st |
| 2025 | Atlassian Williams Racing | Williams FW47 | M16 E Performance 1.6 V6 t | P | (Thailand) Alexander Albon | 5 | 7 | 9 | 12 | 9 | 5 | 5 | 9 | Ret | Ret | Ret | 8 | 6 | 15 | 5 | 7 | 13 | 14 | 14^{6} | 12 | 11^{F} | Ret | 11 | 16 | 137 | 5th |
| 2025 | Atlassian Williams Racing | Williams FW47 | M16 E Performance 1.6 V6 t | P | (Spain) Carlos Sainz Jr. | Ret | 10 | 14 | Ret | 8 | 9 | 8 | 10 | 14 | 10 | DNS | 12 | 18^{6} | 14 | 13 | 11 | 3 | 10 | Ret^{3} | 17† | 13 | 5 | 3^{8} | 13 | 137 | 5th |
| 2026 | BWT Alpine F1 Team | Alpine A526 | M17 E Performance 1.6 V6 t | P | | AUS | CHN | JPN | MIA | CAN | MON | BCN | AUT | GBR | BEL | HUN | NED | ITA | ESP | AZE | BHR | SIN | USA | MXC | SAP | LVG | QAT | ABU | | 63* | 6th* |
| 2026 | BWT Alpine F1 Team | Alpine A526 | M17 E Performance 1.6 V6 t | P | (France) Pierre Gasly | 10 | 6 | 7 | Ret^{8} | 8 | 3 | 7 | 13 | 10 | 11 | 12 | 10^{8} | | | | | | | | | | | | | 63* | 6th* |
| 2026 | BWT Alpine F1 Team | Alpine A526 | M17 E Performance 1.6 V6 t | P | (Argentina) Franco Colapinto | 14 | 10 | 16 | 7 | 6 | 14 | 10 | 15 | 9 | 10 | 15 | 14 | | | | | | | | | | | | | 63* | 6th* |
| 2026 | McLaren Mastercard F1 Team | McLaren MCL40 | M17 E Performance 1.6 V6 t | P | (United Kingdom) Lando Norris | 5 | DNS^{4} | 5 | 2^{1 F} | Ret^{2} | Ret | 3 | 7 | 4^{3} | 7^{F} | 1^{P} | 1^{3 P} | | | | | | | | | | | | | 263* | 3rd* |
| 2026 | McLaren Mastercard F1 Team | McLaren MCL40 | M17 E Performance 1.6 V6 t | P | (Australia) Oscar Piastri | DNS | DNS^{6} | 2 | 3^{2} | 11^{4} | 5 | 5 | 4 | 11^{7} | 5 | Ret | 6^{5} | | | | | | | | | | | | | 263* | 3rd* |
| 2026 | Atlassian Williams F1 Team | Williams FW48 | M17 E Performance 1.6 V6 t | P | (Thailand) Alexander Albon | 12 | DNS | 20 | 10 | Ret | 8 | NC | 17 | Ret | 15 | 17 | 17† | | | | | | | | | | | | | 11* | 9th* |
| 2026 | Atlassian Williams F1 Team | Williams FW48 | M17 E Performance 1.6 V6 t | P | (Spain) Carlos Sainz Jr. | 15 | 9 | 15 | 9 | 9 | 16† | 12 | Ret | 17 | 16 | 18 | 16 | | | | | | | | | | | | | 11* | 9th* |

Notes

- * – Season still in progress.
- ^{†} – The driver did not finish the Grand Prix, but was classified, as he completed over 90% of the race distance.
- ^{‡} – Half points awarded as less than 75% of the race distance was completed.
